= List of Indian writers =

This is a list of notable writers who come from India or have Indian nationality. Names are sorted according to surname.

== A ==
- Khwaja Ahmad Abbas
- Amit Abraham
- Aravind Adiga
- Aadhavan
- Maghfoor Ahmad Ajazi
- Saeed Ahmad Akbarabadi
- Bill Aitken (writer)
- Syed Mujtaba Ali
- Akilan
- Aga Shahid Ali
- B. R. Ambedkar
- Anand
- Anurag Anand
- Mulk Raj Anand
- Asloob Ahmad Ansari
- Lalithambika Antharjanam
- M. P. Appan
- Anjana Appachana
- A. Ayyappan
- Sukumar Azhikode
- Atul Kumar Rai
- Archana Sarat
- Ku. Alagirisami

== B ==
- Harivansh Rai Bachchan
- Urvashi Bahuguna
- C. V. Balakrishnan
- P. K. Balakrishnan
- Balakumaran
- Bibhutibhushan Bandopadhyay
- Manik Bandopadhyay
- Tarasankar Bandyopadhyay
- Ashok Banker
- Vaikom Muhammed Basheer
- Kunal Basu
- Rajshekhar Basu
- Ratan Lal Basu
- Samit Basu
- Sutapa Basu
- Sirpi Balasubramaniam
- Rambriksh Benipuri
- Abhijit Bhaduri
- Chetan Bhagat
- Jagadish Bhagwati
- Mannu Bhandari
- Thoppil Bhasi
- Raaja Bhasin
- Birendra Kumar Bhattacharya
- Suchitra Bhattacharya
- Ram Prasad Bismil
- Kamayani Bisht
- Ruskin Bond
- Jagadish Chandra Bose
- Sharadindu Bandyopadhyay
- B. S. Ramaiya

== C ==
- Neelam Saxena Chandra
- Satyapal Chandra
- Vikram Chandra
- Subhash Chandran
- Upamanyu Chatterjee
- Bankim Chandra Chattopadhyay
- Harindranath Chattopadhyay
- Sarat Chandra Chattopadhyay
- Sanjib Chandra Chattopadhyay
- Shakti Chattopadhyay
- Sitaram Chaturvedi
- Amit Chaudhuri
- Nirad C. Chaudhuri
- Rajat Chaudhuri
- Anuja Chauhan
- Gopal Chhotray
- Pavan Choudary
- R. Chudamani
- Ismat Chugtai
- Balachandran Chullikkadu
- T. M. Chidambara Ragunathan
- C. S. Chellappa

== D ==
- Debashis Chatterjee
- Bakhtiar Dadabhoy
- Indira Dangi
- Gurucharan Das
- Jibanananda Das
- Kamala Das
- Parichay Das
- Manoj Das
- Durjoy Datta
- Esther David
- David Davidar
- Shobha De
- Anurupa Debi
- Mohan Deep
- Bhabananda Deka
- Nalini Prava Deka
- Syed Muhammad Miyan Deobandi
- Henry Louis Vivian Derozio
- Anita Desai
- Kiran Desai
- Purushottam Laxman Deshpande
- Abdul Qavi Desnavi
- Venu V. Desom
- Mukul Deva
- Ashapurna Devi
- Mahasweta Devi
- Nirupama Devi
- Swarnakumari Devi
- Chandrarekha Dhadwal
- Vish Dhamija
- Payal Dhar
- Kewal Dheer
- Ramdhari Singh Dinkar
- Kartar Singh Duggal
- Hazari Prasad Dwivedi
- T.K. Doraiswamy
- Daniel Selvaraj
- R. Dhandayudham

== E ==
- Thunchaththu Ezhuthachan

== F ==
- Mehr Lal Soni Zia Fatehabadi

== G ==
- Narayan Gangopadhyay
- Sunil Gangopadhyay
- Madan Gopal Gandhi
- Mridula Garg
- K. M. George
- Amitav Ghosh
- Bishwanath Ghosh
- Dipak Giri
- V. V. Giri
- Manazir Ahsan Gilani
- Chandradhar Sharma Guleri
- Shantanu Gupta
- Indira Goswami
- Teji Grover
- Ramchandra Guha
- Gulzar
- Rajan Gurukkal
- Akshat Gupta
- Victor Ghoshe
- A. S. Gnanasambandan

== H ==
- Surjit Hans
- S.R. Harnot
- Sri Krishna Rai Hridyesh
- Baby Halder
- Hari Kumar K
- Rafiq Husain
- Qurratulain Hyder

== I ==
- Imaiyam
- Indra Soundar Rajan

== J ==
- Shruti Jauhari
- Kamalakanta Jena
- Radhika Jha
- Raj Kamal Jha
- Ramesh Chandra Jha
- Jeyamohan
- Jayakanthan
- Janardhana Maharshi
- Ki. Va. Jagannathan
- Joe D'Cruz
- C. L. Jose
- Arun Joshi
- Shriniwas Joshi
- Anees Jung
- Tania James
- Mira Jacob
- Manu Joseph
- Thi. Janakiraman

== K ==
- N. N. Kakkad
- Kakkanadan
- Akbar Kakkattil
- Thiru. V. Kalyanasundaram
- Kannadasan
- Binod Kanungo
- Madhur Kapila
- Manju Kapur
- Pawan Karan
- Kalaignar M. Karunanidhi
- Swati Kaushal
- P. Kesavadev
- U. A. Khader
- Masud Husain Khan
- Moniruddin Khan
- Vishnu Sakharam Khandekar
- Shiv Khera
- Ki. Rajanarayanan
- Kovilan
- Kuvempu
- Nitin Kushalappa
- Mukul Kesavan
- Kalki Krishnamurthy
- Uma Krishnaswami
- Priya Kumar
- Ramendra Kumar
- Vinay Kumar
- Kusumagraj
- Sa. Kandasamy
- Kovi Manisekaran

== L ==
- Jhumpa Lahiri
- Lakshmi
- P. Lankesh
- La Sa Ra

== M ==
- Madhan
- M. Ramalingam
- Mu. Metha
- Leela Majumdar
- Rafeeq Mangalassery
- Amulya Malladi
- Kiran Manral
- V. J. Mathews
- Rooma Mehra
- Sudha Menon
- Jyotsna Milan
- Rohinton Mistry
- Bimal Mitra
- Ashoka Mitran
- Qazi Athar Mubarakpuri
- P. F. Mathews
- Oyyarathu Chandu Menon
- Dantu Muralikrishna
- Shaiju Mathew
- Shailesh Matiyani
- Suketu Mehta
- Laxmi Narayan Mishra
- Pankaj Mishra
- Ruchita Misra
- Gopinath Mohanty
- Jagadish Mohanty
- Kanhu Charan Mohanty
- Surendra Mohanty
- Sudha Murthy
- Banu Mushtaq
- Melanmai Ponnusamy
- M. V. Venkatram
- Balai Chand Mukhopadhyay
- Perumal Murugan

== N ==
- Nanjil Nadan
- Amrit Lal Nagar
- Kiran Nagarkar
- Sarojini Naidu
- V. S. Naipaul
- Anita Nair
- Nakulan
- M. T. Vasudevan Nair
- Gopi Chand Narang
- R. K. Narayan
- Fuzail Ahmad Nasiri
- Era Natarasan
- Anand Neelakantan
- Bhalchandra Nemade
- Jawaharlal Nehru
- Zafar Ahmad Nizami
- Charu Nivedita
- Akshay Nair

== P ==
- Mrinal Pande
- Siddharth Pandey
- Srinu Pandranki
- Meghna Pant
- Indira Parthasarathy
- Na. Parthasarathy
- Shekhar Pathak
- Vasudha Patil
- Basharat Peer
- Thakazhi Sivasankara Pillai
- Joygopal Podder
- S. K. Pottekkatt
- Jayshankar Prasad
- Ajay Prabhakar
- Ravindra Prabhat
- Meena Prabhu
- Tapan Kumar Pradhan
- Uday Prakash
- R. Prasannan
- Maitreyi Pushpa
- Munshi Premchand
- Amrita Pritam
- Nalini Priyadarshni.
- Neela Padmanabhan
- Pudhumaipithan
- Poomani
- Ponneelan
- Prapanchan
- Puviarasu
- Pattukkottai Prabakar

== Q ==
- Sayyid Ahmedullah Qadri
- Syed Azhar Shah Qaiser

== R ==
- Sarvepalli Radhakrishnan
- Pankaj Rag
- Pa. Raghavan
- Tushar Raheja
- Hakim Syed Zillur Rahman
- Kuber Nath Rai
- Sara Rai
- Viveki Rai
- Christopher Raja
- C. Rajagopalachari
- Rajashree
- Anil K. Rajvanshi
- Malik Ram
- S. Ramakrishnan
- Anuradha Ramanan
- Sundara Ramasami
- Raja Rao
- Shukhalata Rao
- Vakkantham Suryanarayana Rao
- Abdul Rasheed
- Brajanath Ratha
- Pratibha Ray
- Satyajit Ray
- Sukumar Ray
- Upendrakishore Ray Chowdhury
- Keshava Reddy
- Syed Mehboob Rizwi
- Arundhati Roy
- Purabi Roy
- Salman Rushdie
- Rajam Krishnan
- Rajesh Kumar
- S. Abdul Rahman
- R. P. Sethu Pillai

== S ==
- Padma Sachdev
- Shashi Bhushan Sahai
- Gita Sahgal
- Sarojini Sahoo
- Nandini Sahu
- Sandilyan
- Ashwin Sanghi
- Sankar (writer)
- Gnani Sankaran
- Mahapandit Rahul Sankrityayan
- Kottarathil Sankunni
- Acharya Ramlochan Saran
- Debashis Sarkar
- Prabhat Ranjan Sarkar
- Mandakranta Sen
- Fakir Mohan Senapati
- Vikram Seth
- Amit Shankar
- Pandit Devendranath Sharma
- Lakshmi Raj Sharma
- Pandit Nalin Vilochan Sharma
- Partap Sharma
- Mahamahopadhyaya Pandit Ram Avatar Sharma
- Ram Karan Sharma
- Ram Sharan Sharma
- Ram Vilas Sharma
- Preeti Shenoy
- Hemant Shesh
- Acharya Shukla
- Vishnu Vaman Shirwadkar
- Vandana Shiva
- Nina Sibal
- Melanie Silgardo
- Balmiki Prasad Singh
- Karnail Singh Somal
- Kedarnath Singh
- Khushwant Singh
- Nikita Singh
- Preeti Singh
- Ravinder Singh
- Rustam Singh
- Srijan Pal Singh
- A. Srinivasa Raghavan
- Vijendra Narayan Singh
- Indra Sinha
- Indradeep Sinha
- Mridula Sinha
- Sithara S.
- Mi. Pa. Somasundaram
- Thi. Ka. Sivasankaran
- Sivasankari
- Subha (writers)
- Sujatha
- Seeni Viswanathan
- Padma Rao Sundarji
- Sri Lal Sukla
- Vikas Swarup
- Ka. Naa. Subramaniam
- Su. Samuthiram
- Neelakshi Singh

== T ==
- Abanindranath Tagore
- Debendranath Tagore
- Dwijendranath Tagore
- Hara Kumar Tagore
- Jyotirindranath Tagore
- Rabindranath Tagore
- Satyendranath Tagore
- Rajesh Talwar
- Bhikhari Thakur
- Amish Tripathi
- Vijay Tendulkar
- Tanikella Bharani
- Shashi Tharoor
- Aroon Tikekar
- Gajendra Thakur
- Anshuman Tiwari
- Mark Tully
- Ira Trivedi
- Thoppil Mohamed Meeran
- K. D. Thirunavukkarasu
- G. Thilakavathi
- Tamilanban
- Jeet Thayil

== U ==
- J. P. S. Uberoi
- Thrity Umrigar
- Harilal Upadhyay
- Ulloor S. Parameswara Iyer

== V ==
- Vaasanthi
- Vaidehi
- Vaisakhan
- Vairamuthu
- Atal Bihari Vajpai
- Amit Varma
- Vannadasan
- Vallikannan
- Yandamuri Veerendranath
- Nidudavolu Venkatarao
- Su. Venkatesan
- Abraham Verghese
- Mahadevi Verma
- Nirmal Verma
- K. Vijayakarthikeyan
- Vijayakrishnan
- O. V. Vijayan
- Rishi Vohra
- Mu. Varadarajan
- Gautam Sharma "Vyathit"
- V. C. Kulandaiswamy

== W ==
- Raza Naqvi Wahi

== Y ==
- Kulpreet Yadav
- Yashpal
