= Pankaj =

Male given name in India and Nepal

- Gender: male (female as Pankaja)

Origin
- Meaning: Lotus flower
- Region of origin: India, Nepal

Pankaj is a common name in India and Nepal. It has its roots in the Sanskrit word paṅkaja which refers to the lotus flower. The word is a compound of paṅka 'mud' and the suffix -ja 'born from, growing in'. The associated symbolism is of the lotus that is born in mud and blossoms after arising from mud. The lotus flower is also the national flower of India and is considered to be a symbol of Buddhist teaching (cf. Nalanda).

== Notable people with the name ==
- Pankaj Advani, an Indian billiards and snooker player
- Pankaj Choudhary, an Indian politician of a party
- Pankaj Dheer, an Indian actor
- Pankaj Gupta, an Indian sports administrator and hockey manager
- Pankaj Jain, a professor of religious studies, film studies, and sustainability
- Pankaj Kapur, a Bollywood actor
- Pankaj Manubhai Zaveri, an Indian cricketer
- Pankaj Mishra, an Indian writer
- Pankaj Mohindroo, Indian advocate and publisher
- Pankaj Mullick, a Bengali Indian music director
- Pankaja Munde, an Indian politician
- Pankaj Oswal, the former chairman and managing director of Burrup Holdings Limited
- Pankuj Parashar, a film director
- Pankaj Patel, the current chairman and managing director of Cadila Healthcare
- Pankaj Patel, Uttar Pradesh politician
- Pankaj Rag, current director of the Film and Television Institute of India
- Pankaj Roy, an Indian cricketer
- Pankaj Sharma, an associate professor in clinical neurology at Imperial College
- Pankaj Singh, an Indian cricketer
- Pankaj Tripathi, an Indian actor
- Pankaj Udhas, an Indian Ghazal singer
