= C. H. Prahlada Rao =

Indian writer and journalist (1923–2002)

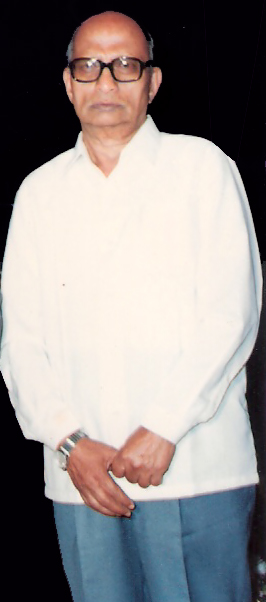
- Born: C. Hanumantha Prahlada Rao; 13 January 1923; Shimoga, Karnataka
- Died: 17 February 2002 (aged 79)
- Occupation: writer
- Spouse: Komalabai
- Children: Mohan, Ravikumar

C.H. Prahlada Rao (13 January 1923 – 17 February 2002) was an Indian writer in English and Kannada languages, a translator, literary critic and a free-lance journalist.

== Personal life ==
Born in Shimoga, Karnataka, India, Prahlada Rao lost his mother in his infancy and grew up in the loving care of his father C.R. Haunmantha Rao. He obtained his early education in Shimoga. His father died before Prahlada Rao could enter college. Having noticed Prahlada Rao's mastery of the English language, his teachers and relatives advised him to enter into the famous Maharaja's College in Mysore and earn a Bachelor of Arts degree. Prahlada Rao graduated in 1948 with a B.A. (honors) degree and three gold medals (Hindi, English, and Sociology). Although he wanted to pursue an M.A. degree in English, it was necessary for him to start earning a living. He came to Bangalore and took up a clerical position in Indian Coffee Board where he served for over three decades until retirement in 1981. During this tenure, Prahlada Rao also spent five years (1969–1974) in New Delhi. Prahlada Rao married Smt. Komala Bai. He had two children, Mohan C.P. and C.P. Ravikumar. Prahlada Rao was known for his simplicity, friendliness, straight talk and honesty. He was a voracious reader of books of all kinds, but his personal favourites were biographies and autobiographies.

== Writing ==
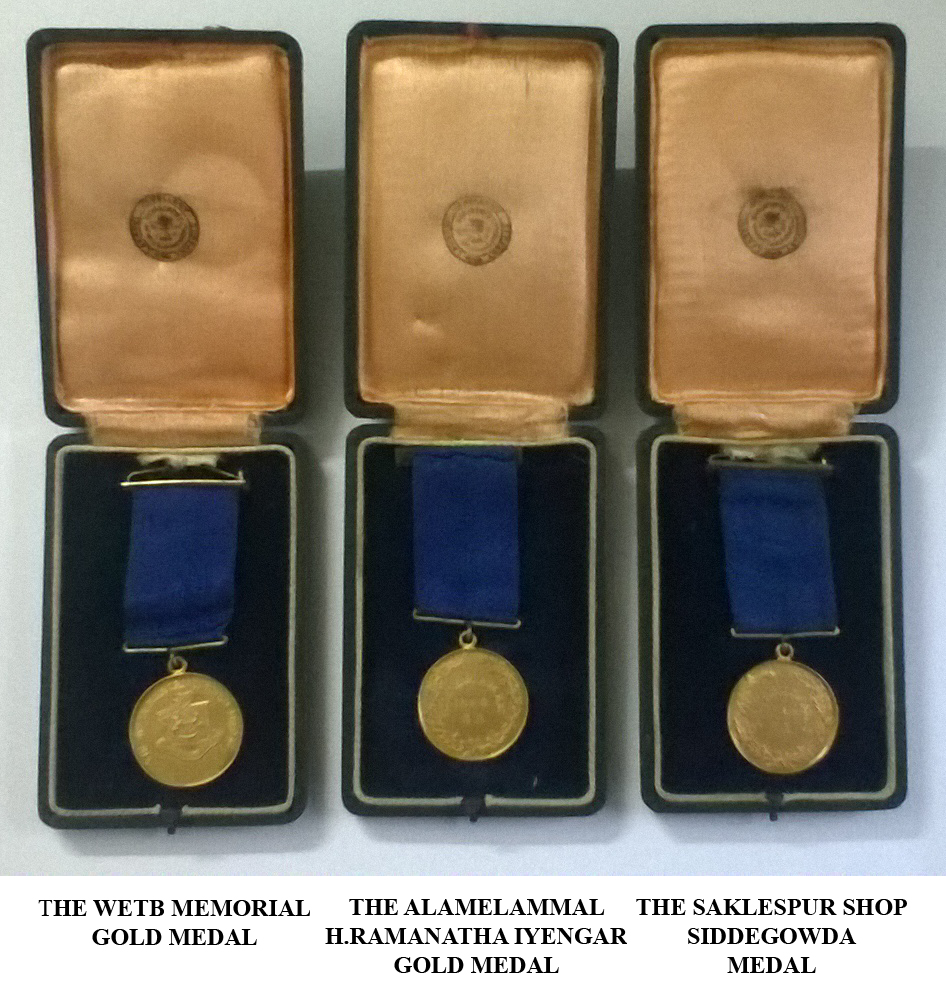
Gold medals won by C.H. Prahlada Rao at Maharaja's College (1948)

Prahlada Rao was influenced by the thought of Mahatma Gandhi even as a young student. He began his writing career as a free-lance journalist for Mysindia. Philip Spratt, the renowned editor of Mysindia, took a linking for this young writer and encouraged him.

"I wrote for MYSINDIA, the English weekly edited by Mr Philip Spratt," wrote C.H. Prahlada Rao "He treated me with unusual kindness; to catch the issue going to press on Tuesday I had freedom to deliver copy to the composing room. Spratt reassured me that he sprinkled a few commas in my copy, which he could as well do in the proofs. He taught me the use of the comma."

Prahlada Rao wrote for Mysindia until the shutters finally came down on the periodical. He would write about Kannada writers, books, and artists, big and small. Later, he began to write for Deccan Herald (Bangalore), Indian Express (Bangalore), Hindustan Times (Delhi), Evening News (Delhi), and The Hindu (Bangalore). His writing career spanned over six decades. He began to contribute book reviews for Deccan Herald, Kannada Prabha, and Indian Express. He was known for taking a firm stand and yet being constructive in his criticism. The Hindu requested him to write a series of articles on Kannada writers and drama artists. After retiring from active service, C.H. Prahlada Rao wrote a weekly column called "Between You and Me" for over 25 years. This column appeared every Monday in the Bangalore edition of The Hindu and enjoyed immense popularity. No topic was too small or too big to write about. He wrote about the problems faced by common people and used the power of his pen to solve them. He offered solutions to the problems of thousands of readers.

== Translations ==
C.H. Prahlada Rao was proficient in both English and the Kannada. Kannada writer Prof. R.S. Mugali approached him to translate selected works by renowned Kannada poets for Non-Kannada readers. Mugali selected the works, and Prahlada Rao translated them. The translations appeared in An Anthology of Indian Literature, edited by K. Santhanam. Prahlada Rao also translated several books published by India Book House, Rashtroththana Sahitya, Navakarnataka Publications, and other publishers.

== All India Radio ==
C.H. Prahlada Rao enjoyed a long and fruitful association with the All India Radio (Bangalore). Due to his ability to translate well from Kannada to English, he often received requests to translate the scripts of Kannada programs. He was also invited on numerous occasions to interview writers. He even conducted one of the episodes of a popular musical programs by selecting film songs composed by famed Kannada writers. He was also invited to be a speaker . He was also interviewed on the topic of the changing landscape of Bangalore city

== Books ==
1. Story of a Song - Ecstasy and Agony, Rashtroththana Sahitya Publications, 1972. This book is a translation of Kannada writer Shivaramu's book "ವಂದೇಮಾತರಂ: ಒಂದು ಕಥೆ- ಒಂದು ವ್ಯಥೆ"
2. English translation of Gods and Goddesses by Maya Balse. Published by IBH Publications, 1073. Indian mythological stories for children.
3. Diwan Rangacharlu, IBH Publications, 1974 (A biography of the Diwan of Mysore, written for children.)
4. Nandalal Bose, Rashtroththana Publications, 1975, a biography of the painter Nandalal Bose, written for children.
5. Man the Divine - A Critical Exposition of Shoonya Sampadane, Mandagiri, Kalmatha, Adoni, 1979. A translation from Kannada of a scholarly work Shoonya Sampadaneya Paramarshe by Prof. S.S. Bhusanuramath.
6. Sravanabelagola India Book House, 1981. An English translation of a book on Srvanabelagola, authored by G. Brahmappa, intended for children.
7. Children's Mahabharatha, Publications Division, Kannada translation of the book by Mathuram Bhutalingam, 1981.
8. Grandfather's birthday, a Kannada translation of a compilation of short stories from Holland, published in the series Vishwakatha Kosha edited by Niranjana, Navakarnataka Publications, 1981, Reprinted in 2001.
9. Dakshina Bharathada Kathamanjari, A collection of folk tales from Southern India, Janapada Academy, 1986
10. Janapada Kathegalu, Janapada Academy, 1989, A collection of folk tales from Karnataka.
11. P.D. Agarwal - The Visionary, Transport Corporation of India, 1988, a biography of a businessman who started from humble beginnings.
