= Ramendra Kumar =

Ramendra Kumar may refer to:

- Ramendra Kumar (author), Indian writer, primarily of children's and young-adult literature
- Ramendra Kumar (politician), parliamentarian (1980-1995) of the Communist Party of India
