= Shashi Bhushan Sahai =

Indian author

Shashi Bhushan Sahai was an Indian author who also served as Director General of Police in Bihar. He was a 1952 batch IPS officer.

== Biography ==
Shashi Bhushan Sahai was born in Arrah, the headquarters of Shahabad district (now Bhojpur) of Bihar. Sahai began his career as a college lecturer in economics in 1950. He joined the Indian Police Service (IPS) in 1952 and rose to be the Director General of Police. He died at 90 in Hyderabad, where he was residing with his one of the sons, working in CISF.He has two sons.The younger son retired on 30 May 2026 as Incpector General in CISF from Kolkata.

== Bibliography ==
His books include:

- Politics of Corruption: The Goddess that Failed, 1995
- India: Twilight At Midday, 1997
- South Asia: From Freedom to terrorism, 1998
- The Alien Of Fakeland, a work of fiction published in London, 2001
- Jihadi Terrorism: Making of a World War?, 2006
- The Hindu Civilization: A Miracle of History, 2010

== See also ==
- List of Indian writers
- Tapan Kumar Pradhan
- Abdul Rasheed
- Asghar Ali Engineer
