= Abhijit Bhaduri =

Indian novelist

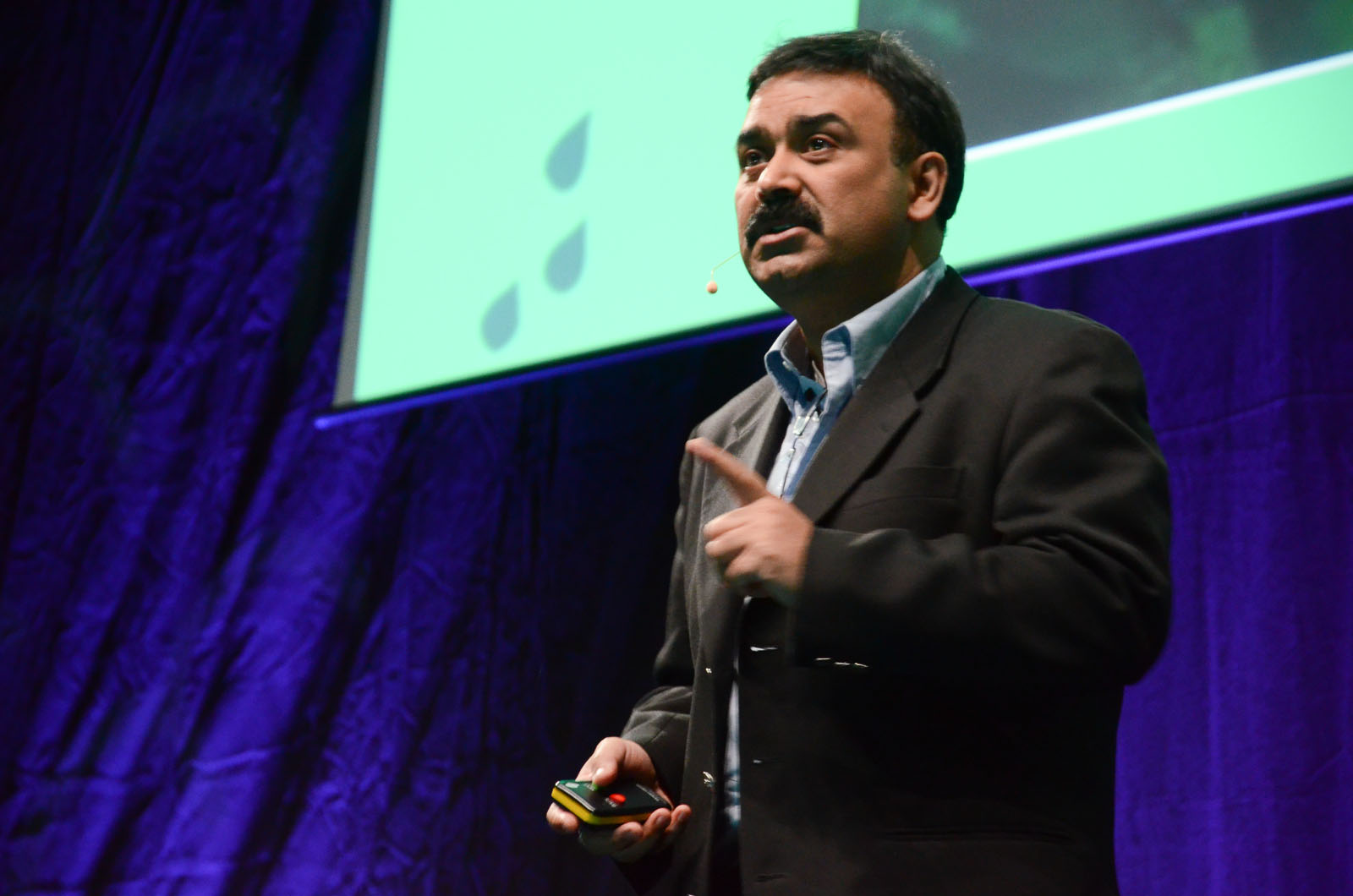
- Abhijit Bhaduri, 2013
- Occupations: Author and columnist
- Writing career
- Genres: Fiction, management
- Notable works: Mediocre But Arrogant; Married But Available; Don't Hire The Best
- Website: abhijitbhaduri.com

Abhijit Bhaduri is an Indian author, and columnist. He is known for his books, Mediocre But Arrogant, Married but Available, and Don't Hire The Best. Bhaduri has written columns in various journals and magazines.

== Career ==
His writings have appeared on HBR Ascend, The Wall Street Journal, The Economic Times, the Hindu Business Line, People Matters, Operations Research & Management Sciences Today. He has been quoted in Knowledge@Wharton and journals like Organizational Dynamics.

Bhaduri was a speaker at TEDx Gurgaon.

== Books ==
Bhaduri's first novel, Mediocre But Arrogant is a story about love and life in a business school.

The book has featured in several best-seller lists – including The Hindu, NDTV.com just trailing Da Vinci Code, Crossword Book Store Chain Fiction Best-Sellers list according to the Deccan Herald.

Bhaduri's second novel in the MBA Series, Married But Available, was also published by HarperCollins, follows the life of the protagonist Abbey through the first ten years of his life as a Human Resources professional.

His third book is a non-fiction book, Don't Hire The Best, published by HarperCollins India is a guide to picking the right team. The book explains why personality fit with the role and culture is the only way successful hiring can happen. Abhijit Bhaduri dwells into how a manager should pay heed to qualification, experience, competence and personality while recruiting and the secrets of good hiring. The book is seen as a practitioner's guide to better hiring. His advice on how to write a resume appears in Harvard Business Review Ascend.

His fourth book - The Digital Tsunami has been described by Forbes as, "The fun of the book, however, comes in 29 full-page sketches that Bhaduri injects along the way. Suddenly we're transported into a comic-book world in which adults are doing handstands, children are waving banners, and giant ice cream cones tower over tiny boats. Shoot me for reading the book this way, but each time I started a new chapter, I shamelessly jumped ahead to the next sketch before going back to read the text." Forbes referred to the visual appeal of the book when it described the 29 Sketchnotes as, "I've Seen Our Digital Future, In These 29 Zany Sketches."

In 2016, Abhijit Bhaduri wrote a chapter on leadership lessons from Feluda for the book Feluda@50.

In 2017, Abhijit Bhaduri wrote an article on "Make Sure Your Resume Survives the Six-Seconds Test" on HBR Ascend. His fifth book - Dreamers & Unicorns is a go-to book that explores the Before Corona (BC) scenario to advise on the After Disaster (AD) environment on future of work, workers and workplaces."

== See also ==
- List of Indian writers

== Reviews and further reading ==
- Levene, Abigail (5 August 2005). "Campus life in book pages". Calcutta, India: The Telegraph.
- Cherian, Tarun (13 November 2005). "Triumph of the mediocre (review)". Deccan Herald. Archived from the original on 13 February 2007.
- "Words weave their tales (review)". Moneycontrol.com. 22 August 2005. Archived from the original on 24 May 2006.
- Rashmi Bansal (13 June 2005). "MBA Authors – A novel pastime". Businessworld.
- Gaurav Saxena (13 April 2008). "Abhijit Bhaduri's Personal Website". Abhijit Bhaduri.
