= Asloob Ahmad Ansari =

Indian writer (1925 – 2016)

Professor Asloob Ahmad Ansari
- Born: 1925; Delhi, India
- Died: 2 May 2016 (aged 90–91); Aligarh, India
- Education: University of Oxford
- Occupations: Writer, critic
- Writing career
- Language: Urdu, English
- Notable work: Iqbal Ki Terah Nazmen
- Notable awards: Sahitya Akademi Award; Pride of Performance; Ghalib Award

Asloob Ahmad Ansari (1925 – 1 May 2016) was an Indian writer, critic, former professor of English department of Aligarh Muslim University (AMU) and editor of Naqd-o-Nazar, Urdu magazine. He wrote in English and Urdu throughout his literary career. His work revolves around study of English and Urdu and research on Muhammad Iqbal, Ghalib and Sir Syed Ahmad Khan. He also wrote about William Blake and William Shakespeare.

== Biography ==
He was born in Delhi in 1925. He obtained his education from the University of Oxford and later started teaching Urdu and English at AMU and until he retired in 1985. His books such as Arrows of Intellect, William Blake’s Minor Prophecies, and Atraf-i Rashid Ahmad Siddiqui were published from Canada and the US in 1978 and 99 respectively.

He was awarded Sahitya Akademi Award in 1980 for his literary criticism titled Iqbal Ki Terah Nazmen, the Pride of Performance and Ghalib Award and Mir Taqi Mir award in recognition of his contribution to Urdu literature. He was also awarded Bahadur Shah Zafar in recognition of his literary criticism work on Muhammad Iqbal.

He died on 1 May 2016 in Aligarh, India.

== See also ==
- List of Indian writers
