= Rooma Mehra =

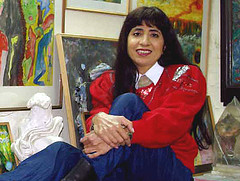

Rooma Mehra (born 24 January 1967) is an Indian poet, painter, sculptor, freelance newspaper writer and a columnist for the Indian Express.

== Career ==
Mehra is a self-taught artist with a social conscience, who has had 11 solo shows of her paintings, reliefs and sculptures. Her artworks are found in private and permanent collections including the National Gallery of Modern Art New Delhi and Lalit Kala Akademi. Mehra's art has been referred to as a new art.

A compilation of her newspaper travel articles was translated by Mehra into the German language and published digitally, entitled Das ausländische Stück des Grases in 2008.

Mehra currently lives and works in Los Angeles, California.

== Selected publications ==
She has written three books of poetry:

- Sunshadow, Writers Workshop, 1981
- 'Reaching Out' (1985), Sagar Printers and Publishers, New Delhi2 34
- For You (1986)Selectbook Service Syndicate, 1986 – 30 pages

== See also ==
- List of Indian writers
