= Devendranath Sharma =

Indian Hindi writer and scholar (1918–1991)

Devendranath Sharma (1918 - 1991) was a writer and scholar of Hindi Literature born in a Bhumihar family of scholars. He was also a playwright and the Vice Chancellor of the Patna University.

== List of works ==
He has authored:

- Hindi Bhasha ka Vikas
- Tulsi sahitya: vivechana aur mulyankan
- Bhashavigyan ki bhumika
- Pranam ki pradarshini mein (lalit nibandh)
- Alankar Muktavali
- Sahajaham ke amsu: chaha ekanki natak
- Mere shreshtha rang ekanki
- Nava ekanki: nadi pyasi thi
- Bhasha aur Bhasya: bhāshāvăijñanika nibãdha
- Amarabhāratī
- Khaṭṭā-mīṭhā
- Rāshṭrabhāshā Hindī, samasyāem̐ aura samādhāna
- Chāyāvāda aura pragativāda Hindī-Sāhitya-Parishad, Patna College dvārā āyojita sāhityika saptāha ke avasara para paṭhita nibandhoṃ kā saṅgraha
- Āīnā bola uṭhā, kalātmaka nibandhoṃ kā saṅkalana
- Brajabhāshā kī vibhūtiyām̐
- Sāhitya-samīkshā
- Pārijāta-mañjarī cāra maulika ekākī nāṭaka

== See also ==
- List of Indian writers
