= Vakkantham Suryanarayana Rao =

Indian writer

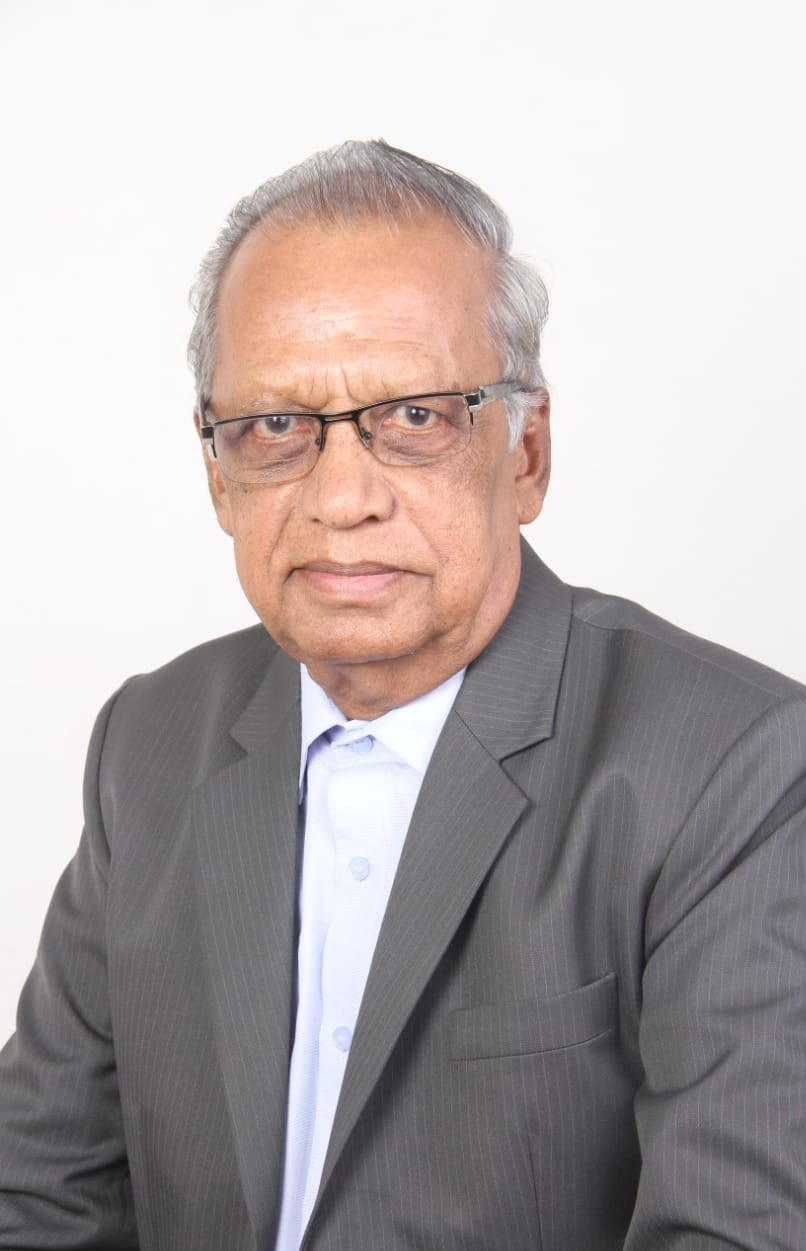
- Vakkantham Suryanarayana Rao
- Born: Arikela Village, Chittoor, Andhra Pradesh, India
- Occupations: Writer, screenwriter, lyricist,

Vakkantham Suryanarayana Rao is an Indian Telugu language author. He wrote several short stories and serialised novels for magazines and translated spiritual texts for the Tirupati Tirumala Devasthanam and had friends among literary circles. His son Vakkantham Vamsi is a screenwriter in Telugu films.

== See also ==
- List of Indian writers
