= R. Prasannan =

Indian academic

- Born: R. Prasannan; September 20, 1929
- Died: 19 January 2002 (aged 72)
- Children: 4

R. Prasannan (September 20, 1929 – January 18, 2002) was an Indian academic, commissioner and a Malayalam author.

He received his initial education in Kerala - B.L. and LL.M. degrees from Kerala University, followed by LL.M. and Ph.D. (Law) from Yale University, USA.

Prasannan held the following posts:

- Professor and Dean, Post-Graduate Studies in Law, Kerala and Calicut University
- Secretary, Kerala Legislative Assembly from 6.11.1969 - 27.4.1984
- Member, Kerala Public Men (Prevention of Corruption) Commission
- Member, Kerala Backward Classes Commission
- Commissioner, Sree Narayana Trust (Government Appointment)
- Member, National Commission for Backward Classes from 05.9.93 to 04.8.96

Prasannan authored eight books in Malayalam. Most notable is "Niyamasabhayil Nishabthanaaye" (Niyamasabhayil niśśabdanāyi) for which he received the 'Sahodharan Ayyappan' Award. He has also authored several magazine and journal articles in English and Malayalam.

== See also ==
- List of Indian writers
