= Bishwanath Ghosh (writer) =

Indian travel writer

- Born: 26 December 1970 (age 55); Kanpur, Uttar Pradesh, India
- Occupations: Travel writer, journalist, poet

Bishwanath Ghosh (born 26 December 1970) is an Indian writer, journalist and poet, best known for his literary travelogues which describe the real essence of India. His most recent book is Jiyo Banaras (2021), a collection of Hindi poems on Banaras. He is also the author of the bestselling Aimless in Banaras: Wanderings in India’s Holiest City, published in December 2019. In August 2017 he published Gazing at Neighbours: Travels Along the Line That Partitioned India, to coincide with seventy years of Partition of India. He is also the author of Longing, Belonging: An Outsider at Home in Calcutta (2014), which is a portrait of present-day Kolkata, and the acclaimed Tamarind City: Where Modern India Began (2012), which is a portrait of Madras, now known as Chennai. In 2009 he published the hugely popular Chai, Chai: Travels in Places Where You Stop but Never Get Off, which The Telegraph (Kolkata) called "a delightful travelogue with a difference" and which was subsequently translated into Hindi and Marathi.

He was born in Kanpur, Uttar Pradesh, where he started his career as a journalist in 1993 with The Pioneer. He subsequently worked with the Press Trust of India and The Asian Age in New Delhi. He moved to Chennai in 2001 to join the New Indian Express group. He joined The Times of India in 2008 when the newspaper launched its Chennai edition. At present he is an associate editor with The Hindu and lives in Kolkata, having made the city his home in August 2018 after nearly 18 years in Chennai.

== See also ==
- List of Indian writers
