= Publications Division =

Indian state publisher

Publications Division (India)
- Founded: 1941
- Headquarters location: Soochna Bhawan, CGO Complex, Lodhi Road, New Delhi
- Owners: Ministry of Information and Broadcasting (India), Govt. of India
- Official website: http://publicationsdivision.nic.in/

Publications Division (India) is a publishing house in India, with its headquarters at Soochna Bhawan, CGO Complex, Lodhi Road, New Delhi. It functions as a division of the Ministry of Information and Broadcasting (India). It publishes books in Hindi, English and other regional languages.

== History ==
Established in 1941, Publications Division publishes books on a range of subjects including arts, culture, national heritage, biographies of national leaders in various fields, science, flora and fauna and children's literature. The house has published a 100-volume set of the collected works of Mahatma Gandhi as well as individual volumes of his work.

The Publications Division also publishes journals including Yojana, on development; Kurukshetra, on rural development; Ajkal, a literary magazine; Bal Bharati, for children; and Employment News, which lists government job openings. It also participates in exhibitions and book fairs.

The materials are sold through agents, online, and via its own outlets: eight sales emporiums in Bangalore, Chennai, Hyderabad, Kolkata, Lucknow, Navi Mumbai, Patna, and Thiruvananthapuram.

== Notable publications ==
- Builders of Modern India: Hakim Ajmal Khan edited by Zafar Ahmad Nizami
- Builders of Modern India: Hakim Ajmal Khan by Zafar Ahmad Nizami
- Builders of Modern India: Pandit Deendayal Upadhyaya, Urdu translation by Raamish Siddiqui
