= Akshay Nair =

Indian ophthalmologist

- Born: Mumbai, India
- Citizenship: Indian
- Education: Diplomate of National Board; Sankara Nethralaya; L V Prasad Eye Institute; New York Eye and Ear Infirmary of Mount Sinai
- Occupation: Ophthalmologist
- Relatives: Indumati Gopinathan (mother)
- Medical career
- Research: Ophthalmology

Akshay Nair is an Indian ophthalmologist based in Mumbai, India. He specializes in oculoplastics, orbital surgery and ocular oncology. Currently, Dr. Nair is the Director of Ophthalmic plastic surgery and ocular oncology services at the Mumbai units of Dr. Agarwal's Eye Hospital: Advanced Eye Hospital and Institute and Aditya Jyot Eye Hospital.

== Medical career ==
Dr. Nair trained in ophthalmology at Sankara Nethralaya in Chennai, India. He subsequently completed a fellowship in oculoplastics and ocular oncology at L. V. Prasad Eye Institute under Dr. Santosh Honavar among others. He also completed a fellowship in orbital surgery supported by the International Council of Ophthalmology at the New York Eye and Ear Infirmary of Mount Sinai in New York, USA.

Specialising in eyelid, orbital and thyroid eye disease surgery, Dr. Nair was one of the first clinicians to report and study the association between the invasive fungal infection Mucormycosis, COVID-19 and recent-onset diabetes which was seen after the second wave of the COVID-19 pandemic in India. Notably, in 2021 Nair and Dave proposed a novel protocol for case selection of patients suitable for orbital injection of the antifungal drug, Amphotericin-B which has helped improve outcomes in rhino-orbital mucormycosis, a disease traditionally known to have high mortality rates. In this regard, he has been interviewed as an expert extensively by The Times, BBC News, Barkha Dutt, Qatar-based news channel Al Jazeera, the French daily Le Figaro and The Washington Post. As of 2022, Dr. Akshay Nair has published over 120 scientific papers in peer-reviewed journals and features in the top 2% of the most-cited researchers globally in 2021 across all specialities (published by Elsevier).

Dr. Nair also serves as a consultant for HelpMeSee in developing in a surgical simulator. He is an elected officer in the executive committees of the Asia Pacific Society of Ophthalmic Plastic and Reconstructive Surgery and the Oculoplastics Association of India. Additionally, Dr. Nair has been inducted as an editorial board member on the American Academy of Ophthalmology-ONE network Oculoplastics/Orbital Surgery sub-section; becoming the first international (non-American) member to be inducted for a term of 5 years.

== Awards / Honors ==
- 2011: All India Ophthalmological Society: S D Athawale Award for Best Paper in Neuro-Ophthalmology
- 2016: Raman Mittal Award for Best Original Free Paper in any field of Ophthalmic Plastic, Reconstructive and Aesthetic Surgery by the Oculoplastics Association of India.
- 2018: Gangadhara Sundar Award for Best Original Free Paper presented by a Young Ophthalmologist - awarded by the Oculoplastics Association of India.
- 2019: Achievement Award by the American Academy of Ophthalmology
- 2019: Achievement Award by the Asia Pacific Academy of Ophthalmology
- 2021: All India Ophthalmological Society: Best Paper in Ophthalmic Pathology/Oncology

== Selected books/chapters ==
- Evisceration and Enucleation
- The Role of Photography in Oculofacial Aesthetics
- Retinal and Choroidal Imaging in Neurological disease
- Imaging of Retinal and Choroidal Metastases
- Life-Threatening Infections: Emergencies of the Orbit and Adnexa
- Sebaceous Gland Carcinoma
- Periocular and Adnexal Injuries Due to Animal Bites
