= Anees Jung =

Indian author and journalist (born 1944)

- Born: 15 December 1944 (age 81); Rourkela, Odisha; India
- Education: University of Michigan
- Occupations: Writer, journalist, columnist
- Known for: Unveiling India (1987)

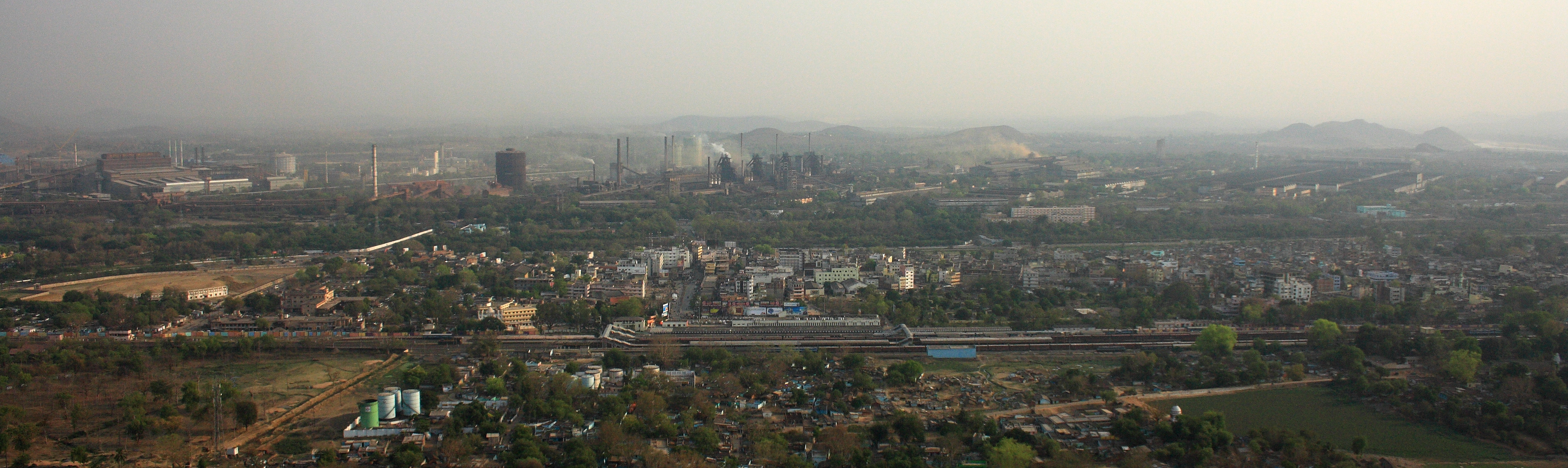
Rourkela, a city where Anees was born.

Anees Jung (born 15 December 1944) is an Indian author, journalist and columnist for newspapers in India and abroad, whose most known work, Unveiling India (1987) was a chronicle of the lives of women in India, noted especially for the depiction of Muslim women behind the purdah.

== Early life and education ==
Born in Rourkela, and growing up in Hyderabad, Anees Jung is from an aristocratic family – her father, Nawab Hosh Yar Jung, was a scholar and poet, and served as the musahib (adviser) to the last Nizam (prince) of Hyderabad State. Her mother and brother are also Urdu poets. After schooling and college at Osmania University in Hyderabad, she went to the United States for higher studies at University of Michigan Ann Arbor, where she did her master's degree in sociology and American studies.

== Career ==
She started her career in writing with the Youth Times, a Times of India publication, where she worked as a journalist and editor (1973 to 1980). She has subsequently worked for The Christian Science Monitor and the International Herald Tribune. Anees Jung lives in Delhi.

=== Books ===
Jung published Unveiling India in 1987. It is a travel diary focusing on interviews with women. She has written several subsequent books on the same, talking to women about their everyday lives, including Night of the New Moon: Encounters with Muslim women in India (1993), Seven Sisters (1994). Breaking the Silence (1997) is based on conversations on women's lives from around the world.

Others are maltreated by alcoholic fathers or married off early or sexually abused, though some find refuge in schools set up by well-meaning NGOs. A section of this book is part of the NCERT's, an academic publisher, Class 12 English Book in CBSE Schools Jung is noted for her lively and vivid descriptions.

== Bibliography ==
- When a Place Becomes a Person. Vikas Pub. House, 1977. ISBN 0-7069-0526-1
- Flashpoints: Poems in Prose. Tarang Paperbacks, 1981. ISBN 0-7069-1440-6.
- Unveiling India, Penguin Books, 1987. ISBN 0-14-010344-9.
- The Song of India. Himalayan Books, 1990. ISBN 81-7002-055-7
- Night of the New Moon: Encounters with Muslim Women in India. Penguin Books, 1993. ISBN 0-14-023405-5
- Seven Sisters: Among the Women of South Asia. Penguin Books, 1994. ISBN 0-14-024579-0
- Breaking the Silence: Voices of Women from Around the World. Penguin Books, 1997. ISBN 92-3-103374-3
- Olives from Jericho: Peace in Winter Gardens. UNESCO, 1999. ISBN 92-3-103642-4.
- Beyond the Courtyard: a Sequel to Unveiling India. Viking, 2003
- Lost Spring: Stories of Stolen Childhood. Penguin Books, 2005. ISBN 0-14-400016-4.

== See also ==
- List of Indian writers
- Indian literature
