= Vasudha Patil =

Indian writer

Vasudha Patil was a Marathi writer from Maharashtra, India.

She started writing in the 1970s Marathi short stories and one-act plays, some of which pertain to the contemporary change in the role of women in Marathi-speaking (and Indian) society, economic and intellectual freedom of women, and assertion of women's rights.

The following are some of Patil's works:

- Deepagriha Ani Samudrapakshi (दीपगृह आणि समुद्रपक्षी) (एकांकिका)
- Phakta Ek Warsha Teen Mahine (फक्त एक वर्ष तीन महिने)
- Gulam Ani Itar Katha (गुलाम आणि इतर कथा)
- Jamunake Tir (जमुनाके तीर) (1968)
- Pakshiteerth (पक्षीतीर्थ) (एकांकिका)
- Utarati Unhe (उतरती उन्हं)
- Namarda (नामर्द)
- Pankha (पंख)
- Sanai (सनई)

== See also ==
- List of Indian writers
