= Aroon Tikekar =

Indian scholar and journalist

- Born: Aroon Tikekar; 1 February 1944
- Died: 19 January 2016 (aged 71)

Aroon Tikekar or Aruṇa Ṭikekara (1 February 1944 – 19 January 2016) was an Indian scholar and authority on Mumbai, as well as a journalist. He wrote over 20 books. He died on 19 January 2016 due to breathing-related complications. The noted journalist authored over 20 books in Marathi as well as in English. He is the recipient of several literary and journalism awards, and was an adjunct professor in the Department of Journalism and Communications, University of Pune.

== Career ==
Aroon Tikekar was born in a family of authors and journalists. He worked as a college teacher for some years, then became the language and literature expert and acquisitions specialist at the US Library of Congress Office in New Delhi. His career in newspapers started with a job as r Reference Chief with the Times of India He then became a senior assistant editor with the Maharashtra Times. As archival research chief at the Times of India, he was responsible for writing the official history of the 150-year-old newspaper. He was appointed editor of the Marathi newspaper Loksatta, published by the Indian Express Group, and held that position from 1991 to 2002. As of 2009 he was adjunct professor in the Department of Journalism and Communications at the University of Pune. He is the recipient of several literary and journalism awards.

Aroon Tikekar is an ardent defender of the Marathi-language press. In June 2010, as a resident of the Asiatic Society of Mumbai, Tikekar inaugurated the Observer Research Foundation's Maharashtra@50 Study Centre. The Asiatic Society has a collection of over 200,000 books, some rare. Tikekar was active in campaigning for funds to restore books that are suffering from the damaging effects of heat, humidity and insects. In October 2010 he lashed out against the University of Mumbai's decision to drop Rohinton Mistry's controversial book Such a Long Journey from its syllabus.

== Books ==
To support his research, Aroon Tikekar built a collection of about 3,000 rare books, mostly on British India and the British Presidency of Bombay. He wrote more than twenty books in Marathi and in English. His PhD thesis The Kincaids, Two Generation of a British Family in the Indian Civil Service was published as a book, exploring the lives of the civil servants and authors Charles Augustus Kincaid and his son Dennis Kincaid. Marathi books include Jan-Man and Sthal-Kaal. His lectures given at the University of Mumbai on Justice Mahadev Govind Ranade were published in his book Ranade – The Renaissance Man. In 2006 he published The cloister's pale: a biography of the University of Mumbai which interweaves the history of the university with the history of the city. His 2009 book Mumbai De-Intellectualised: Rise and Decline of a Culture of Thinking explores the growth of intellectual activity in Mumbai under British colonial rule, which continued into the 1960s and 1970s, and discusses the causes of the gradual decline in more recent times.

== Bibliography ==
Marathi-language books which reproduce his newspaper columns include:

- Samaaj-Spandane, Taratamya (5 vols),
- Jana-Mana,
- Sthala-Kaal,
- Aswastha Maharashtra (2 vols),
- Kaalmeemansaa
- Saramsha

English-language books include:

- Aroon Tikekar; Aruṇa Ṭikekara (1992). The Kincaids, two generations of a British family in the Indian civil service. Promilla & Co. ISBN 81-85002-13-4.
- Aroon Tikekar (2000). Ranade – The Renaissance Man. Śrīvidyā Prakāśana. ISBN 0-04-394389-6.
- Aroon Tikekar, Aruṇa Ṭikekara, University of Bombay (2006). The cloister's pale: a biography of the University of Mumbai. Popular Prakashan. ISBN 81-7991-293-0.
- Aroon Tikekar (2009). Mumbai De-Intellectualised: Rise and Decline of a Culture of Thinking. Promilla & Co. ISBN 978-81-85002-97-2.

== See also ==
- List of Indian writers
