= Pa. Raghavan =

Tamil writer

Pa Raghavan
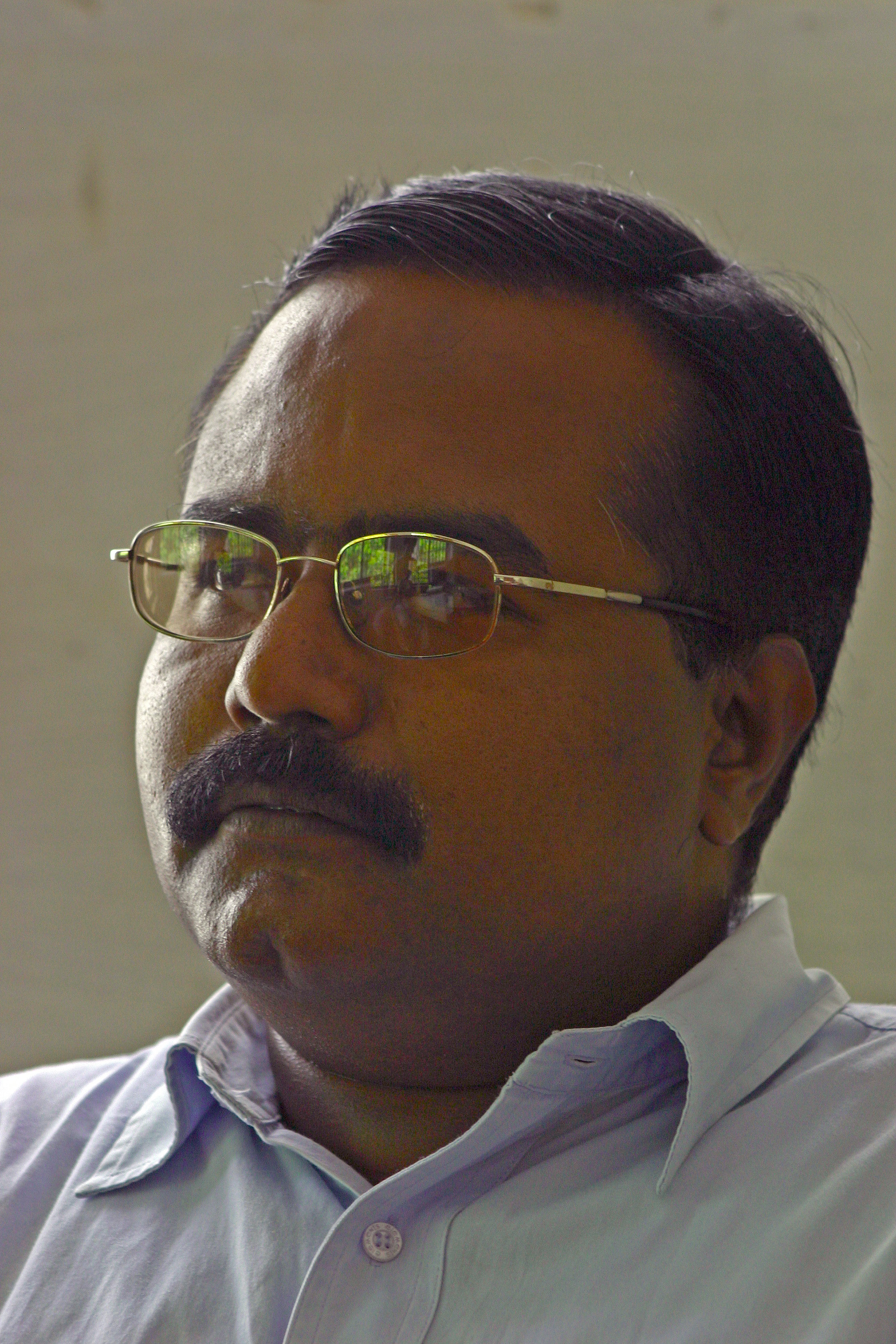
- Occupation: Writer
- Writing career
- Language: Tamil
- Years active: 1990-Present
- Subjects: Novels, Politics
- Website: writerpara.com

Pa. Raghavan, a well known Tamil writer, winner of the prestigious ‘Bharathiya Basha Parishad Award’ in 2004. His best known and most appreciated work is Yathi, a Novel, which shows the world of Indian Sanyasis (Monks). His non fictions like Dollar Desam (Political History of America) and Nilamellam Raththam (History of the Israel – Palestine Conflict) are considered to be the milestones in Tamil non-fiction writing.

== Life and education ==
Pa. Raghavan, often called Para, was born on 8 October 1971 to R.Parthasarathy and P. Ramamani in Adayar, Chennai. His father hailed from Thanjavur District of Tamilnadu and is from a family of teachers. His father had a career in education starting as a teacher and held various posts such as Head Master, District Education Officer before retiring as the Deputy Director in the Department of Education. He wrote short stories and poems under the pen name R.P. Sarathy. He has also translated books such as Baburnama, Mahavamsa and India After Gandhi. Due to the nature of his father’s job, the family had to shift to various places and Para attended different schools in these places to complete his education. The family finally settled in Chennai and Para completed his diploma in Mechanical Engineering in the Central Polytechnic Chennai. Today, Para lives with his wife and daughter in Chromepet, Chennai.

== Career ==
=== Professional career ===
Para was very interested in writing from early days. His first published work was a Children’s Poem in the Tamil Magazine 'Gokulam'. Although he was writing continuously from then on, Para says he was able to master the technic of writing only after he got the friendship of Ma.Ve. Sivakumar, one of the great Tamil writers in 1989. In 1990, a story of his was published in the reputed magazine ‘Kanaiyazhi’ which got him the attention of the Tamil Literary community.

Para entered into the Tamil magazine arena through his story ‘Mohenjodaro’, a critical review of the events that happened due to the Ram Janma Bhoomi - Babar Masjid issue, which was published in the magazine ‘Kalki'. He joined the magazine and was its Assistant Editor from 1992 to 2000. He worked in ‘Kumudam’ after that for three years. He became the editor of ‘Kumudam Junction’ when it was launched.

In 2004, he quit the magazines and entered the publishing industry. He joined as the Chief Editor of ‘Kizhakku Publications’ and was instrumental in bringing out their ’Nalam’, “Varam’ and “Prodigy’ line of books. He was in charge of the publication of over a thousand books and his work in publishing is still spoken about. He left this and turned a full-time writer in 2011. He has penned Thirteen novels and over 50 political history books.

=== Writing career ===
Till the year 2000, Para had been writing only short stories and novels. When he joined ‘Kumudam’ he wrote a series on the political history of Pakistan. The success of that prompted him to concentrate more on political history. He then wrote ‘Dollar Desam’ (American Political History), ’Nilamellam Raththam’ (On Israel - Palestine issues), ‘Mayavalai’ (On International Terrorism) amongst many other books in this genre. He was known to explain complex political issues in simple language for a layman to understand.

He returned to fiction, in the year 2017, with his novel ‘Poonai Kathai’ based on his experiences in the entertainment industry. He followed that up with ‘Yathi’ exploring the world of Sanyasis. Para had spent time with sanyasis for a brief period to satisfy his spiritual needs. He says his meeting with Swami Thapasyananda of Ramakrishna Mutt gave him the balance he was looking for and he realized that his mission is to write. After Yathi, his new novel Iravaan was published in 2020 January.

=== Television career ===
When he turned a full time writer, Para also started writing screen plays and dialogues for television serials. He has worked in over 15 serials. He has penned the screen play and dialogues for the serial ‘Vani Rani’ from 2011 to 2018 encompassing over 1750 episodes. This is considered a record in the Indian television industry.

=== Film career ===
Para has also written the dialogs for two Tamil movies - ‘Kanakavel Kakka’ in 2010 and ’Thambi Vettothi Sundaram’ in 2011.

== Writings ==
=== Political ===
1. Prabhakaran Vaazvum Maranamum
2. Mayavalai
3. Taliban
4. Pervez Musharaf
5. En Peyar Escobar
6. ETA : Or Arimugam
7. Aum Shinrikyo : Or Arimugam
8. ISI Nizhal Arasin Nija Mugam
9. Lakshar E Taiba : Or Arimugam
10. Jama Islamia : Or Arimugam
11. Hezbollah : Or Arimugam
12. Al Qaeda : Or Arimugam
13. Iraq Plus Saddam Minus Saddam
14. Hitler
15. Nilamellam Raththam
16. Dollar Desam
17. 9/11 : Soozchi Veezchi Meetchi
18. Pak Oru Puthirin Sarithiram
19. Kashmir 100 C
20. Maoist : Abayangalum Pinnanigalum
21. RSS: Varalarum Arasiyalum
22. Sarvathikarathil Irundhu Jananayagathirku
23. Oil Rekhai
24. Kalavara Kaala Kurippugal
25. Adipparu Mangaththa
26. Ponnana Vaakku
27. ISIS- Kolaikaran Pettai

=== Biographies ===
1. Yanni: oru kanavin kathai
2. Poliga Poliga - Ramanujar

=== Novels ===
1. Alai Urangum kadal
2. Puviyiloridam
3. Mellinam
4. Alagilaa Vilayaattu
5. Thoonilum Iruppaan
6. Rendu
7. Poonai Khadhai
8. Yadhi
9. Kosu
10. Kal Kilo Kadhal Arai Kilo Kanavu
11. Bulbulthara
12. Iravaan
13. Kabadavedathari

=== Short story collections ===
1. Nilaa Vaettai
2. Moovar
3. Paravai Yuddham
4. Kudhiraigalin Kadhai
5. Munnooru Vayadhu Penn
6. Oorvana

=== Humor ===
1. Unsize
2. Kutriyalulakam
3. Inky Pinky Pongy
4. Sindhu Veli Nagarigam
5. Uyy
6. Veettodu Mappillai

=== Essay Collections ===
1. Excellent!
2. Jeyitha Kathai
3. 154 Kilo Byte
4. 24 Karat
5. Pin Kathai Surukkam
6. Unavin Varalaaru
7. Open Ticket
8. Moondrezhuththu
9. Mozart
10. Hitler
11. Jaina Madham
12. Irandam Ulagap Por
13. America Viduthalaip Por
14. Islamiya Madham

=== Audio Books ===
1. Hezbollah : Bayangarathin Mugavari
2. Hitler

=== Television Serials ===
1. Ketti Melam (Jaya TV)
2. Malargal
3. Sivasakthi (Sun TV)
4. Vani Rani (Sun TV)
5. Kalyana Parisu (Sun TV)
6. Kanmani (Sun TV)
7. Uthiri Pookkal (Sun TV)
8. Chellame (Sun TV)
9. Munthanai Mudichu (Sun TV)
10. Mane Devuru (Udaya TV)
11. Muththaram (Sun TV)
12. Chellakkili (Sun TV)
13. Devathai (Sun TV)
14. Puthukkavithai (Vijay TV)
15. Kalyana Parisu (Sun TV)
16. Siva Sankari (Sun TV)
17. En Iniya Thoziye (Raj TV)
18. Arundhathi (Raj TV)
19. kalyanamalai (SunTV)
20. Chithi 2

== Awards ==
- Bharathiya Basha Parishad Award(2004)
- Ilakkiyapeetam Award (For the novel Alagila Vilayaattu)
- Thiruppur Tamil Sangam Award (For the novel Mellinam)
- Kambam Bharathi Ilakkiya Peravai Award for Iraq Plus Saddam Minus Saddam (2008)
- Sun Best Dialog Writer Award for Vani Rani Serial (2018)
- Vasaka Salai Best Novelist Award for Poonai Kathai (2018)
- Lilli Deivasikamani Memorial award (For the collection Paravai yuddham)

== See also ==
- List of Indian writers
