= K. Vijayakarthikeyan =

Indian bureaucrat and civil servant (b. 1986)

Dr. K. Vijayakarthikeyan IAS
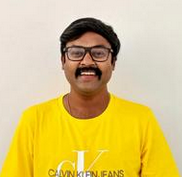
- Indian Author, Bureaucrat
- Born: 8 January 1986 (age 40); Madurai, Tamil Nadu
- Education: Shri Ramachandra Medical College
- Occupations: Civil Servant, Author, Doctor
- Employer: Indian Administrative Service
- Known for: Administration, Health, Urban Management, Solid-Waste
- Spouse: Chandrika Vijayakarthikeyan
- Father: Kannan
- Awards: The best corporation award (2016); Most inspiring author (2018); Dr. APJ Abdul Kalam Memorial Award (2018)
- Website: vijayakarthikeyan.com

Dr. K. Vijayakarthikeyan (born 8 January 1986) is an Indian author, bureaucrat, civil servant and currently serving as the secretary of Tamil Nadu State Human Rights Commission. He served as the Collector of Tiruppur District in Tamil Nadu, Commissioner & Special Officer, Coimbatore City Municipal Corporation, Assistant Collector (Trainee) at Erode and Sub Collector at Kovilpatti before his appointment as Director for Tamil Nadu Institute of Urban Affairs Coimbatore City.

Vijayakarthikeyan is also a doctor, and an author, having been regarded as the youngest Commissioner of Coimbatore Municipal Corporation. He is engaged in training and motivating youngsters for appearing in civil service examinations. He is also a writer and has authored several books in Tamil & English including Ettum Doorathil IAS, Adhuvum Idhuvum, Orey Kallil 13 Maangai, Jayippadhu Eppadi, Once upon an IAS exam, Heart Quake and Mafia Premier League.

Vijayakarthikeyan has received several national awards for his work achievements. He has received the Dr. APJ Abdul Kalam Memorial Award for Innovation in Governance (Kiga) at an event held in New Delhi.

== Career ==
Vijayakarthikeyan was born on 8 January 1986 in Madurai, Tamil Nadu. He has completed his graduation in medicine at Shri Ramachandra Medical College, Chennai in 2009 and also holds a degree of Master of Public Administration. Later, Vijayakarthikeyan followed the footsteps of his father R. Kannan, who is an Indian Forest Service officer to pursue the civil services. His father is also a principal chief conservative officer of south zone, Madurai.

He got trained as the Assistant Collector in Erode, Erode District, Tamil Nadu. During his training, he set up a group named "Kovilpatti Study League" and trained village students for competitive examinations. Later, he served as the Sub Collector/Sub-divisional Magistrate of Kovilpatti, Tuticorin District, Tamil Nadu.

Vijayakarthikeyan started out as an Assistant Collector and served in Erode from June 2012 to May 2013. He also served as the Sub Collector/Sub-divisional Magistrate of Kovilpatti, Tuticorin district, Tamil Nadu from September 2013 to November 2014. His journey as a Commissioner started from 2014 onwards.

In 2014, Dr. K. Vijayakarthikeyan was elected as the Commissioner of Coimbatore Municipal Corporation and has been designated as the Special Officer, since October 2016.

He has also been appointed as a managing director and a chief executive officer at Coimbatore Smart City Limited in July 2016. In February 2019, he got transferred and posted as the director for Tamil Nadu Institute of Urban Affairs Coimbatore City.

== Books ==
- Ettum Thoorathil IAS (Tamil), Vikatan Publication, 2014, ISBN 9788184765915
- Adhuvum Idhuvum (Tamil), Vijaya Pathippagam, 2017, ISBN 978-8184468328
- Orey kallil 13 Maanghai (Tamil), Vijaya Pathippagam, 2018, ISBN 9788184469011
- Once Upon an IAS Exam, Rupa Publications, 2018 ISBN 978-9353045951
- Oru Cup Coffee Saapidalaama (Tamil), Sapna Book House, 2019, ISBN 978-9388587723
- Jeipathu Yepadi (Tamil), Vikatan Publishing, 2018, ISBN 978-9388104067
- Heart Quake, Rupa Publications, 2019, ISBN 978-9353335328
- TNPSC to UPSC, New Century Book House Pvt. Ltd., 2019, ISBN 978-93-8897-348-9
- Mafia Premier League, Rupa Publications, 2021, ISBN 9391256317

== Awards and achievements ==
- 2016: Received the best corporation award at the 45th Skoch Summit held in Hyderabad
- 2017: Received Digital India Award at a function at Delhi
- 2017: Pride of Tamil Nadu 2017 under Emerging & Inspiring Category at Chennai
- 2018: Most inspiring author of 2018 at Gurgaon Literature Festival
- 2018: Received the Dr. APJ Abdul Kalam Memorial Award on Innovation in Governance (Kiga) at an event held in New Delhi
- 2018: Pride of Tamil Nadu 2nd Edition under The Emerging category
