= Sri Krishna Rai Hridyesh =

Hindi writer (1910–1999)

Sri Krishna Rai "Hridyesh" (1 September 1910 – 13 June 1999) was a literary figure of Hindi. He belongs to Kathaut, Gauspur Ghazipur U P. He was a freedom fighter. He wrote more than two dozen books and was founder of Ghazipur Nagari Pracharani Sabha.

== List of works ==
- Yuvak(1935)
- Himanshu(1940)
- Path Deep(1950)
- Satyasatya
- Maha Prakash
- Ganga Mujhe Pukare
- Foolo Ki Ghati(1984)
- Meghdoot(1990)
- Sankh Pushp(1996)
- Pandit Surya Deo Sharma-Ek Jwalant Vyaktitva-(1990)
- Suresh Chandra Gupta(1992)
- Zamindar Ki Beti
- Band Gumnami Ka Mausam
- Hridyesh Satsai
- Lok Sewak

== See also ==
- List of Indian writers
