= Amit Shankar =

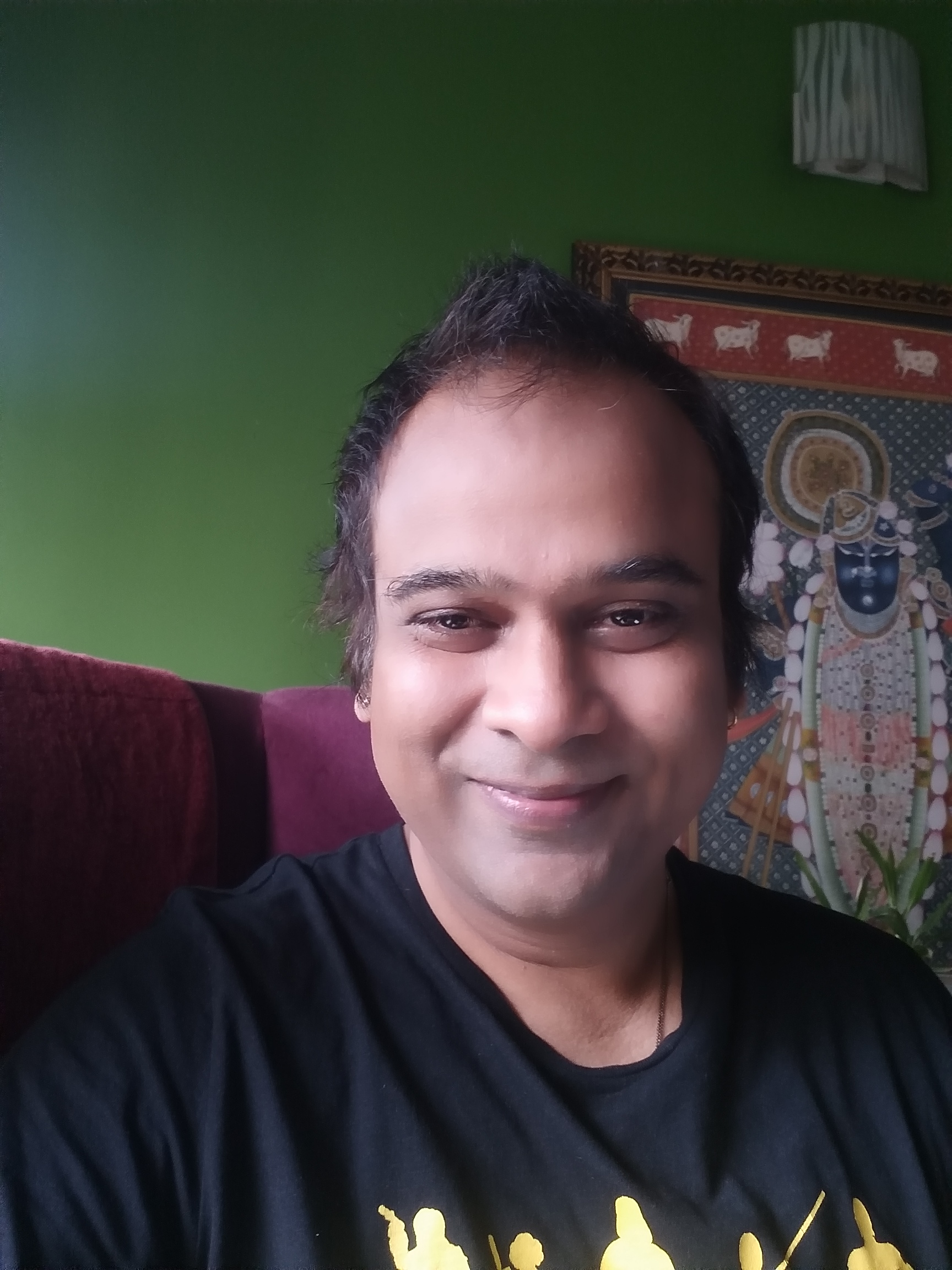
Amit Shankar, author and poet

Amit Shankar (born 15 November 1973) is an advertising professional-turned-author. Currently based out of Gurgaon, Shankar has written five fiction titles, and authored and edited two international poetry collections. His short stories have been adapted into films, plays and skits. His titles have represented contemporary Indian fiction at Frankfurt Book Fair and the Beijing Book Fair.

== Early life and education ==
Shankar was born in Allahabad, Uttar Pradesh, India. He completed his schooling from St. Joseph's College, Allahabad and then moved to Delhi for further studies. He holds a post-graduate degree in Commerce from University of Delhi.

== Early career ==
Shankar began his advertising career by joining McCann Erickson. He has worked at companies like Publicis Groupe, Wunderman, Solutions and Dentsu. His clientele included: Nestle, GM, Microsoft, Cisco, WHO, Pedigree and USAID.

Shankar has also worked at the Canadian company Nortel Networks. After which he joined Sparrow, an animation agency, as the CEO of the company.

== Writing ==
He quit his job to focus full-time on his writing career because he was missing lessons and morals in contemporary writing.

His first fiction title Flight of the Hilsa (2010) explores the meaning of happiness through the character of Avantika Sengupta, a young Bengali painter. The novel garnered critical acclaim and has represented the contemporary Indian fiction at the Frankfurt and Beijing Book Fair in 2014.

His second fiction title, Chapter 11 (2011), is a commentary on the urban conflict and suggests answers to day-to-day complex issues. Love is Vodka – A Shot Ain’t Enough (2012), Shankar’s third book, explores the confusion around the word love.

Café Latte (2014), a collection of 18 short stories, was registered in the Limca Book of Records for being the first book launched with a film on one of the stories.

The book surveys various hues of death.

Never Alone, Always Lonely is an international poetry coffee table book where fifty of his poems have been interpreted by 12 artists, both from India and abroad.

His latest offering, Uberlegen is his first thriller. It traces a secret WW2 genetic formula that has gone missing.

== Others ==
Shankar is the founder of The Great Indian Literary Festival. It focuses on bringing Indian literature in regional languages to the fore. Its Season1 and 2 were held in Udaipur in 2017 and 2018.

He believes that Hindi has to play a crucial role in unifying the nation and therefore it has to be promoted both in terms of content and reach.

During its Season 4, writers, poets and artists from Romania, Hungary, Ukraine and Switzerland also joined.

He is also the founder of House of Lions, a brand and communication consultancy with offices in India and France.

As a guest speaker and visiting faculty he visits corporate, design and management institutes.

== See also ==
- List of Indian writers
