= Anjana Appachana =

American novelist

Anjana Appachana is an American novelist of Indian descent. She has written a book of short stories titled Incantations and a novel titled Listening Now. Her second novel, Fear and Lovely, was published in March, 2023.

== Career ==
Her first book Incantations and Other Stories was published in England by Virago in 1991 and in the US by Rutgers University Press in 1992. The book was reissued in India by Penguin in 2006. The stories in it are set in the early 1980s in India. One of her short stories titled "Sharmaji" was included in Mirrorwork: Fifty Years of Indian Writing, a collection edited by Salman Rushdie and Elizabeth West. Appachana received the O. Henry Festival Prize and a creative writing fellowship from the National Endowment for the Arts in the United States.

Her first novel and second book, Listening Now, was published by Random House in 1997. In the book, six women tell the story of two lovers, Padma and Karan, spanning sixteen years. The novel is set in Bangalore, Delhi and Lucknow.

Fear and Lovely, her second novel, was published by Random House in 2023. The novel concerns a young woman growing up in New Delhi, and deals with themes of depression and secrecy.

== See also ==
- List of Indian writers
