= Mukul Deva =

Indian polymath

Major Mukul Deva (Retd.) is an Indian polymath. Based in Singapore, he is a motivational keynote speaker, executive coach, business mentor and bestselling author. He writes spy-military thrillers on terrorism, action, crime as well as business and self-help books.

== Bibliography ==
His works include:

- "Time After Time", (Minerva Press, 2000),
- "S.T.R.I.P.T.E.A.S.E. - The Art of Corporate Warfare", (Penguin, 2002 & Marshall Cavendish, 2012)
- "M.O.D.E.L. The Return of the Employee", (Sage, 2006 / Cernunnos 2019)
- "Women In Cinema", (HarperCollins, 2007) - co-authored with Wanti Singh
- "Laskhar", (HarperCollins 2008),
- "Salim Must Die", (HarperCollins, 2009)
- "Blowback", (HarperCollins, 2010)
- "Tanzeem", (HarperCollins, 2011)
- "The Dust Will Never Settle", (HarperCollins, 2012)
- "R.I.P.", (Westland, 2012)
- "Weapon of Vengeance" (TOR, USA, 2012)
- "F.C.U.K. Your Way to Success", (Marshall Cavendish & Westland, 2013)
- "And Death Came Calling", (HarperCollins, 2014)
- "The Garud Strikes", (Westland, 2014)
- "Assassins", (TOR, USA, 2015)
- "Pound of Flesh", (Westland, 2016)
- "Make Success A Habit", (Armour, 2017)
- "Rise Through The Ranks", (Influence Solutions, 2019) - co-authored with Karen Leong and Wendy McDonald.
- "One Night Stand", (Cernunnos 2023)

== See also ==
- List of Indian writers
