= Indira Dangi =

Indian novelist, playwright, short story writer (born 1980)

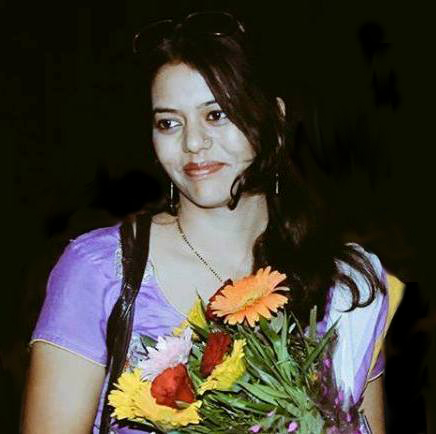
- Born: 13 February 1980 (age 46); Datia, Madhya Pradesh, India
- Education: MA, PhD
- Occupations: Novelist, playwright, writer
- Writing career
- Notable works: Haweli Sanatanpur, Ek Sou Pachas Premikayen, Acharya, Rapatile Rajpath Rai, Rani Kamalapati
- Notable awards: Yuva Puraskar Jnanpith Navlekhan Anushansa Award

Indira Dangi (Hindi: इन्दिरा दाँगी) (born 13 February 1980) is a Hindi novelist, playwright and short story writer She has published one novel, one theatrical play and two books of short stories. Her works are widely acclaimed and acknowledged. She is a recipient of the Yuva Puraskar and Jnanpith Navlekhan Anushansa Award.

== Bibliography ==
=== Novel ===
- Haveli Sanatanpur (Bharatiya Jnanpith, 2014) ISBN 978-9326352802
- Raptiley Rajpath ISBN 978-9386534194

=== Stories ===
- Ek Sau Pachaas Premikaen (Rajkamal Prakashan, 2013) ISBN 9788126729036
- Shukriya Imran Sahib (Periodical Publications, 2015) ISBN 9788171383078

=== Drama ===
1. Acharya 2. Rajkumar pithaura 3. Rai 4. Doosri shaadi

== Awards ==
- Sahitya Akademi Youth Award - 2015
- Kalamkar Story Award - 2014
- Bharatiya Jnanpith Navlekhan Recommendation Award - 2013
- Ramakant Memorial Story Award - 2013
- Vagiswari Award - 2013
- Savitri Bai Phule State Service Award - 2011
- Ramji Mahajan State Service Award - 2010

== See also ==
- List of Indian writers
