= V. J. Mathews =

Malayalam writer and businessman

V. J. Mathews Vanniyamparambil
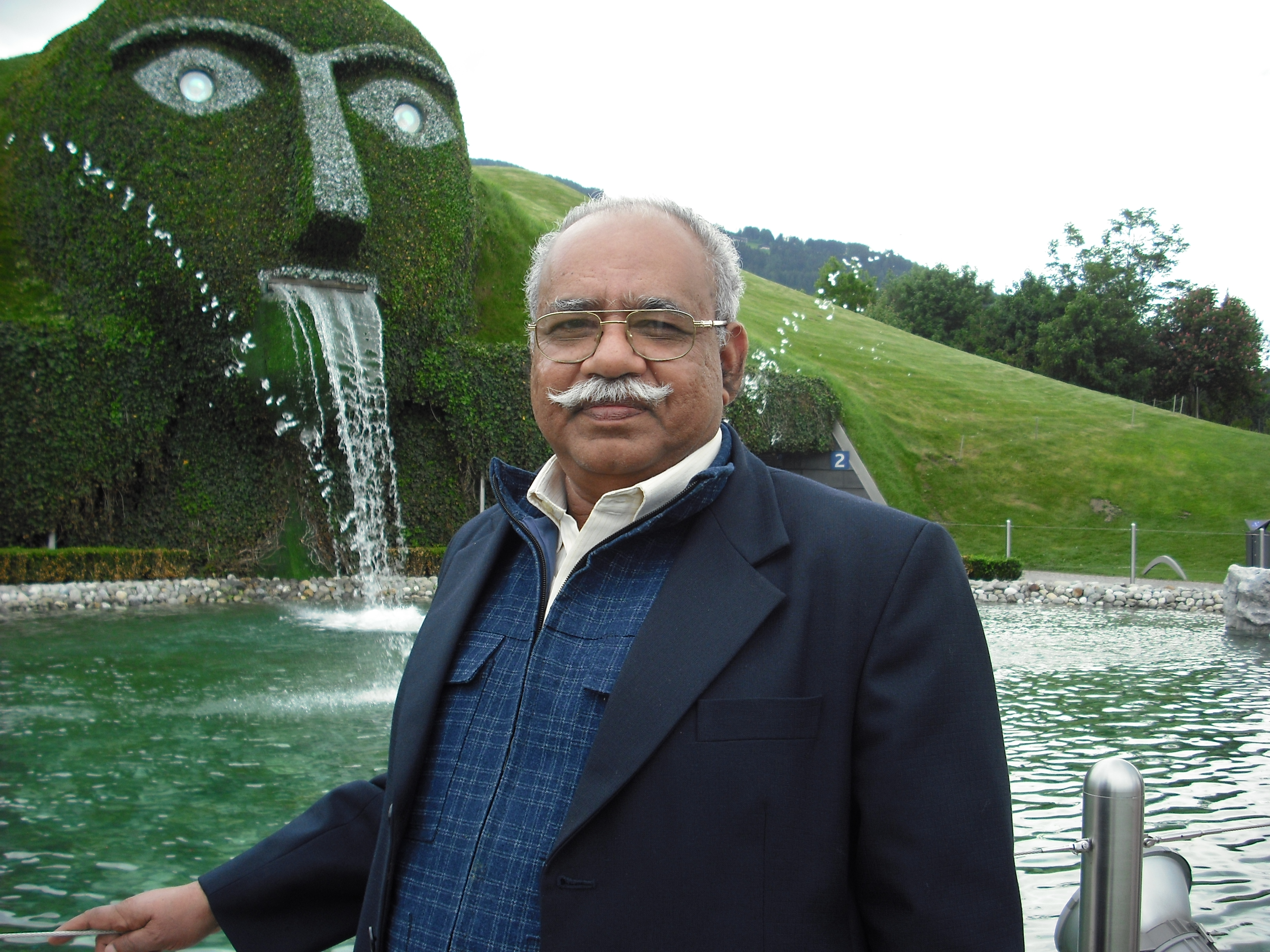
- Mathews on the background of The Giant at entrance to Swarovski Crystal Worlds
- Born: 28 April 1944 (age 82); Cherthala, Alappuzha district, Kerala
- Citizenship: Indian
- Occupations: writer, entrepreneur
- Employer: Leetha Group of Industries
- Notable work: The Upsurge, Padayottam, Untold Gospel
- Title: Chairman and CEO
- Military career
- Allegiance: India
- Branch: Indian Air Force
- Conflicts: Indo-Pakistani War of 1965; Indo-Pakistani War of 1971
- Website: www.VJMathews.com

Vanniyamparambil Joseph Mathews, popularly known as V. J. Mathews, is a Malayalam writer, Indian Air Force personnel and businessman from Kerala, India. He is the founder and chairman of the Leetha Group of Industries, established in Kalamasserry, Cochin, Kerala.

== Career ==
Mathews started his own industrial packaging business named ‘Leetha Industries’ at Kalamassery with seven employees, and financial assistance from a bank. It grew to be a major industrial venture with four factories and 500 employees. He is the chairman of ‘Leetha Group’ consisting of Leetha Pack, Leetha Graphics, Leetha Press & Process and a partnership concern, Leetha Industries, which is an export company in Kerala.

== Writing ==
His first novel Adiyozhukkukal (1982) was serialized in Kerala Times. Current Books published Adiyozhukkukal in three editions. In 1983, a story named 'Maranathinte Manamulla Onasmarankal' received an award from Vanitha' Ten stories were published in various publications. He has published twenty five books, including three English books (The Upsurge, Untold Gospel, Devil and Deity.

#	Name	Type of work	Publisher	Year of publishing
	Adiyozhukkukal	Novel	Current books	1982
	Vazhithirivukal	Novel	Current books	1986
	Vairudhyangal	Novel	Current books	1990
	Parivarthanam	Novel	Current books	2000
	Nettipattom Kettiya Kuzhiyanakal	Novel	Current books	2001
	Sakhsyam	Novel	Current books	2001
	Padayottam	Novel	Current books	2002
	Prathikriya	Novel	Current books	2007
	Smrithiradham	Novel	H&C	2010
	Ariyaatha Suvishesam	Novel	H&C	2010
	Pithruvanam	Novel	H&C	2012
	Chuvadukal	Novel	H&C	2013
	Prathigamanam	Novel	Kerala Sahitya Mandalam	2014
	Babel Gopurangal	Novel	Kerala Sahitya Mandalam	2014
	Midhya	Novel	Kerala Sahitya Mandalam	2015
	Pinnampuram	Novel	Kerala Sahitya Mandalam	2015
	Kazhchappaadu	Novel	Self Published	2016
	Tharangam	Novel	Kerala Sahitya Mandalam	2017
	O Jerusalem	Screen Play	Self Published	2010
	Pithruvanam	Screen Play	Self Published	2010
	Vidhi	Screen Play	Self Published	2010
	Sthreedhanam	Drama	Self Published	2010
	The Upsurge	Novel English	Amazon	2018
	Untold Gospel	Novel English	Amazon	2018
	Devi & Deity	Novel English	Amazon	2019

== Media reviews ==
The New Indian Express reviewed The Upsurge on 22 January 2019.

The New Indian Express reviewed Untold Gospel on 30 March 2019.

The New Indian Express reviewed Devil & Deity on 1 May 2019.

== See also ==
- List of Indian writers
