= Swati Kaushal =

- Education: Lady Shri Ram College; Delhi University; IIM Calcutta
- Occupation: Novelist
- Writing career
- Genre: Fiction
- Notable works: Piece of Cake, A Girl Like Me, Drop Dead, Lethal Spice, A Few Good Friends

Swati Kaushal is an Indian author and the author of the five bestselling novels, Piece of Cake (2004), A Girl Like Me (2008, Drop Dead (2012), Lethal Spice (2014), and A Few Good Friends (2017). In 2013, Kaushal was nominated to the L'Oreal Women of Worth Award in the Literature category.

== Biography ==
Kaushal was born and brought up in New Delhi and her stories are based on her personal experiences. An MBA from IIM Calcutta, she has worked with Nestle India Limited and Nokia Mobile Phones, India. Kaushal lives in Connecticut with her husband and children.

Piece of Cake is one of India's first women's fiction books and was an immediate hit upon its launch. Covered in numerous publications, including the New York Times, this novel's protagonist is Minal Sharma. A 29-year old up and coming marketing associate, whose hilarious brushes with matrimony, romance and product launches connected with audiences across cultures, with a translation and publication in Germany.

A Girl Like Me portrays the life of an Indian girl named Anisha Rai and her adaptation to the cultures, people and her school in India. A Girl Like Me has resonated with a wide array of audiences across ages and praised for its sensitive yet sparkling style.

In 2012 she published Drop Dead a police-procedural featuring a female protagonist - Senior Detective Niki Marwah of the Himachal Police, and followed it up in 2014 with a sequel, Lethal Spice. Drop Dead was one of the earliest entrants in the Indian female crime fiction genre, and was noted for its strong-willed, bold yet feminine lead. In Lethal Spice, Kaushal brings Niki Marwah back in the unique setting of a televised chef competition.

In 2017, Swati Kaushal launched her fifth book, A Few Good Friends, a novel about how friendships both transform and endure.

== Bibliography ==
- A Piece of Cake, 2005 Details
- A Girl Like Me, 2008 Details
- Drop Dead, 2012 Details
- Lethal Spice, 2014
- A Few Good Friends, 2017

== See also ==
- List of Indian writers
