= Abdul Rasheed (writer) =

Indian writer (born 1965)

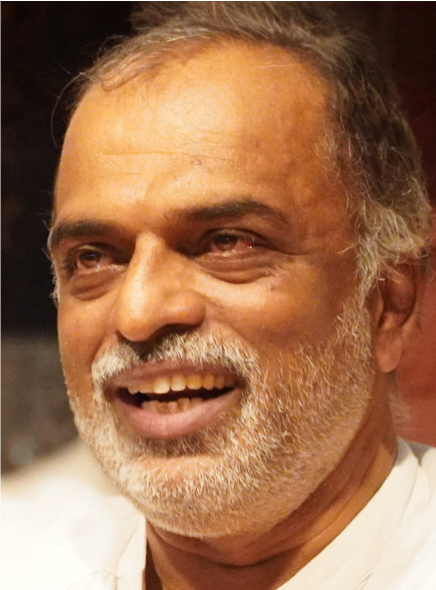
- Abdul Rasheed (Kannada Writer)
- Born: 28 February 1965; Kodagu
- Education: Mysore University, Maharaja College
- Occupation: Writer
- Writing career
- Language: Kannada
- Period: 21st century
- Genres: Fiction, Poetry
- Notable works: Hoovinakolli; Nanna Paadige Nanu
- Notable awards: Sahitya Akademi; Karnataka Sahitya Academy

Abdul Rasheed (born 1965) is an Indian writer, poet, editor and translator from Karnataka. In 2004 he won Sahitya Akademi Golden Jubilee Award for lifetime achievement. He also a translator, blogger, columnist and radio personality.

== Early life and education ==
Abdul Rasheed was born on 28 February 1965 at Suntikoppa, Coorg in Karnataka and grew up in Kodagu district. He obtained his bachelor's degree in journalism from Maharaja's College, Mysore and master's degree in English literature from University of Mysore.

== Professional career ==
Rasheed works with All India Radio as a program officer. Currently he is Program Director with Mysuru Akashavani He is the editor of online magazines "Kendasampige" and "Mysorepost" which are widely read by Kannada public. He has written the life stories of celebrated Kannada artists like Vidyabhusana in his blogs.

== Literary works ==
Rasheed has published two novels, four books of short stories, four books of creative essays and two anthologies of poetry. His popular stories include "Kirti Patake" (Red Flag) and "Hoovinakolli" His first novel ‘’Hoovinakolli’’ was published online before paperback was released in 2011.

He has also translated the works of Hemingway, Camus, Pushkin, Rumi and Rilke. Rasheed's works are difficult to classify and he is known as a genre bender weaving together prose, poetry, journalism and biography. His works have been translated into English, German, Swedish and Hindi. His poetry collections include ‘’"Nanna Paadige Nanu"’’ and ‘’"Narakada Kennaligeyantha Ninna Benna Huri"’’

Abdul Rasheed is often called Kannada's Basheer because of comparison of his fiction works with that of celebrated Malayalam writer Vaikom Muhammed Basheer.

== Other contributions ==
Rasheed writes columns for Kannada newspapers like Vijaya Karnataka. He is a modern pioneer in Kannada column writing. He is a regular speaker at various national and state-level literary festivals including Bangalore Literature Festival, Mysore Literature Festival and Kerala Literature Festival.

He has served as a jury for various literary awards including TOTO Funds Arts (TFA) awards. He is the founder editor of Kendasampige Blogging Website, which metamorphosed into the publishing house Kendasampige Prakashana.

Rasheed has been a delegate of Sahitya Akademi to various countries including Sweden and Syria under cultural exchange program. He has addressed seminar of Asia-Pacific Broadcasting Union. He has also collaborated in international literary translation projects.

== Opinion and criticism ==
Rasheed feels that the new generation of writers are not bothered about imagery or technique, but rather focused on first hand narratives. Rasheed has been vocally critical of Hindutva terror and religious fundamentalism in contemporary literature. He is also vocal about conservation of tribal language and culture.

== Awards and recognition ==
Rasheed's award-winning works include four anthologies of short stories Pranapakshi, Haalu Kudida Huduga, Sampoorna Parijata and Eethanakada Kethegalu. His works were recognised by Sahitya Akademi which conferred on him its golden jubilee prize in 2004. He also won Karnataka Sahitya Academy award for his book Haalu Kudiga Huduga. Besides he has won numerous other literary awards including Sandesha Award for journalism and Kempegowda Award for contribution to Kannada literature.

== Bibliography ==
=== Books in English ===
- Rasheed, Abdul (2021). Mysore Post. New Delhi: Kohinoor Books. ISBN 978-81-952546-1-3.
- Rasheed, Abdul (2002). Requiem. New Delhi: Sahitya Akademi.

=== Books in Kannada ===
- Rasheed, Abdul (2020). Hottu Gottillada Kathegalu. Mysore: Anugraha Prakashana. ISBN 978-81-935949-8-8.
- Rasheed, Abdul (2011). Hoovinakolli. Mysore: Kendasampige Prakashana. ISBN 978-81-921147-1-2.
- Rasheed, Abdul (2017). Hallu Kudida Huduga. Mysore: Anugraha Prakashana.
- Rasheed, Abdul (2020). Pranapakshi Eethanakada. Mysore: Anugraha Prakashana. ISBN 978-81-935949-8-8.
- Rasheed, Abdul (2014). Sampoorna Parijatha. Mysore: Anugraha Prakashana.
- Rasheed, Abdul (1992). Nanna Paadige Nanu. Bangalore: Kannada Sangha Publications.
- Rasheed, Abdul (2008). Narakada Kennaligeyantha Benna Huri. Mysore: Anugraha Prakashana.
- Rasheed, Abdul (2013). Kaaluchakra. Mysore: Abhinava Publications.
- Rasheed, Abdul (2015). Alemaariya Dinachari. Mysore: Anugraha Prakashana. ISBN 978-81-935949-8-8.
- Rasheed, Abdul (2005). Mathigoo Ache. Mysore: Kannada Sangha Publications.

=== Journal articles ===
- Rasheed, Abdul (2002). "Requiem". Indian Literature. 46 (1): 207–09.
- Rasheed, Abdul (2005). "Contemporary Kannada Literature". Indian Literature. 49 (1): 199–205. JSTOR 23346594.
- Rasheed, Abdul (2013). "Moosa Moyliar's Darling Daughter and the Evil Creature Hellipattar". Indian Literature. 57 (4): 108–116. JSTOR 43856804.
- Rasheed, Abdul (2005). "Comrade and Umma". Indian Literature. 49 (1): 24–31. JSTOR 23346548.

=== Translations ===
- Lord Cornwallis and Queen Elizabeth (2021), Akshara Prakashana

== See also ==
- Sahitya Akademi Award
- Karnataka Sahitya Academy Award
- Indian Writers
- Kannada literature
- Tapan Kumar Pradhan
- Sithara S.
