= Bakhtiar Dadabhoy =

Indian author

Bakhtiar Dadabhoy is an Indian Parsi author who has written a number of books on the lives of eminent Parsis.

== Early life ==
He was born in Secunderabad, Telangana. He currently resides in New Delhi. He was educated at Hindu College, University of Delhi & the Delhi School of Economics.

== Career ==
He himself is a Parsi and he writes primarily on the lives of eminent Parsis, such as J. R. D. Tata and Zubin Mehta.

== Bibliography ==
His notable books include:

- "Jeh", A Life of J.R.D. Tata
- Sugar in Milk: Lives of Eminent Parsis
- Zubin Mehta: A Musical Journey
- Barons of Banking: Glimpses of Indian Banking History
- The Magnificent Diwan: The Life and Times of Sir Salar Jung I
- A Book of Cricket Days
- A Dictionary of Dates
- The Rupa Companion to the ICC Champions Trophy (2006)

== See also ==
- List of Indian writers
