= Sutapa Basu =

Indian author

- Sutapa Basu at the 2025 Jaipur Literature Festival
- Born: 20 January 1957 (age 69); Bankura, West Bengal, India
- Education: Post Graduate in English Literature | Bachelors of Arts in Education
- Alma mater: Convent of Jesus and Mary, Ambala Visva-Bharati University Hemwati Nandan Bahuguna Garhwal University
- Occupations: Author, Educationist, Poet, Writing Coach
- Writing career
- Notable awards: Author Award 2019 -The Curse of Nader Shah Write India Campaign 2016 - First Prize Public Diplomacy Forum 2021 - Excellence in Publishing

Sutapa Basu is an Indian author, educationist, poet, translator and a writing coach. She is most known for her works Dangle, Padmavati and Genghis Khan, The Curse of Nader Shah and The Birth Of My Nation.

Sutapa has been the Director, Publishing at Encyclopædia Britannica Ltd, South Asia and Eupheus Learning Solutions.

== Early life and education ==
Basu was born in Bankura, West Bengal. Her father, Lt Col Subrata Bose, was an officer in the army and her mother, Susmita Bose, was a homemaker. She graduated from Convent of Jesus and Mary at Ambala. She completed graduation with Honours in English Literature from Visvabharati University, Santiniketan and Post Graduation in English Literature from HN Bahuguna University, Uttarakhand. She also holds a teaching degree from Maharaja Sayaji Rao University, Vadodara.

She lives in Delhi with her husband, Col. Satchit Kumar Basu, an ex-Army officer and family.

== Career ==
=== As a publishing professional ===
Her professional life of 47 years includes work as an educational faculty and creative writing trainer. As a publishing professional that spans a 25 year career with Oxford University Press (India), Encyclopædia Britannica (South Asia), Eupheus Learning Solutions and Readomania,she has designed and supervised publishing of more than 400 titles.

=== As an author ===
Basu is the author of 10 books which include Dangle and Padmavati,The Legend of Genghis Khan, The Curse of Nader Shah, Out of the Blue, The Anatomy of Affection, Princesses, Monsters and Magical Creatures, The Cursed Inheritance, The Birth of My Nation, and Parvatibai. Dangle was her debut novel, a psychological thriller. She has contributed short stories to Crossed and Knotted, Defiant Dreams and When they Spoke anthologies and poems to Muse India, Kaafiyana, The Dawn Beyond Waste and Remnants of Loss poetry collections.

She is the editor of Chronicles of Urban Nomads, Crossed and Knotted, Rudraksha - When Gods Came Calling. Sutapa Basu won the first position for writing a short story in the genre of mythological-fiction in response to the prompt given by author Amish Tripathi in the 2017 TOI Write India Season 1.

Her debut book, Dangle was nominated for the Anupam Kher Award for Best Debut English Novel in 2017. Basu's story, "Classroom Wiles" that talks about an English Teacher's first day at school, was one of the stories in a play directed by Sujata Soni Bali called "Once Upon a Time." Her non-fiction book for children, The Birth Of My Nation, has been prescribed as a Reader for students of several schools in 2023.

She is well-known for her best-selling historical fiction, Padmavati, The Queen Tells Her Own Story published in 2017. This is the first book in the Heroic Women of India Series. Her second historical fiction initiated the Invader Series with The Legend of Genghis Khan was published in 2018 and continued with The Curse of Nader Shah was published in 2019. Two of her anthology of short stories was published in 2020 and two books, The Cursed Inheritance (a mystery adventure) and Princesses, Monsters and Magical Creatures ( the English translation from Bengali of the iconic Thakurmar Jhuli ) were released in 2021. The Birth of My Nation was released in 2022 and Parvatibai (this is the second book in the Heroic Women of India Series) was launched in 2023. Her books have been published by Readomania Publishers till now.

=== As a writing coach ===
Sutapa’s Studio is a learning space for writers. Basu mentors children, young adults, and aspiring authors in creative writing skills at Sutapa’s Studio. Recently an anthology Love Can Kill And Other Stories authored by the mentees of Sutapa’s Studio has been released.

=== As a podcaster and talk show host ===
Sutapa hosts her own podcast called The Sutapa Basu Show.

Sutapa’s stories, poems and talks are podcast by the East London Talking Stories Radio Show and CBSE Shiksha Vani.

She writes a travel vlog called Sutapa’s Itchy Feet and maintains a YouTube Channel with videos, interviews, blogs and stories.

Bistro Buzz - Conversations with Sutapa Basu is a Facebook live chat with eminent personalities.

== Awards & Recognition ==
- Best Fiction Award by AutHer Awards, 2020, instituted by JK papers and the Times of India for The Curse of Nader Shah
- First Prize of the Times of India Write India Campaign for Amish Tripathi. 2016
- Nominated for the Anupam Kher Award for Best Debut English Novel in 2017.
- Award for Excellence in Publishing by the Public Diplomacy Forum in 2021.
- Nominated for Best Young Adult Book by Women Auther Awards and Valley of Words Book Awards - The Birth Of My Nation (2023)

== Bibliography ==
=== Historical Fiction ===
==== Heroic Women of India Series ====
Padmavati, The Queen Tells Her Own Story (Readomania, 2017)

Parvatibai, The Forgotten Witness of the Battle of Panipat (Readomania, 2023)

==== Invader Series ====
The Legend of Genghis Khan (Readomania, 2018)

The Curse of Nader Shah (Readomania, 2019)

=== Fiction ===
==== Thrillers ====
Dangle

The Cursed Inheritance (Readomania, 2021)

==== Children's Literature ====
Princesses, Monsters, and Magical Creatures (Readomania, 2021)

==== Anthologies ====
Out of the Blue, Stories with a Twist (Readomania, 2020)

The Anatomy of Affection, Tales that Touch You (Readomania, 2020)

=== Non-Fiction ===
The Birth Of My Nation, Tracing India’s Nationhood (Readomania, 2022)

=== Academic ===
The English Tree, Books 1 to 8 (Eupheus Learning Solutions, 2022)

The English Route, Books 1 to 8 (Saraswati House, 2016)

Emerald, Term Books 1 to 5 (Saraswati House, 2018)

=== Podcast ===
The Sutapa Basu Show

East London Radio Show Talking Stories

StoryTelling on CBSE Shiksha Vani

== See also ==
- List of Indian writers
- Indian English literature
- Ramendra Kumar
- Arup Kumar Dutta
- Arundhati Roy
