= Mediocre But Arrogant =

2005 novel by Abhijit Bhaduri

Mediocre but Arrogant
- Author: Abhijit Bhaduri
- Language: English
- Genre: Fiction
- Publisher: HarperCollins
- Publication date: 2005
- Publication place: India
- Media type: Print (Paperback)
- ISBN: 978-93-502-9121-4
- Website: https://harpercollins.co.in/book/mediocre-but-arrogant/

Mediocre but Arrogant is a 2005 novel written by Abhijit Bhaduri. It is the first novel of the MBA series. It is a fictional story set in Jamshedpur which documents the life of the protagonist, Abbey, at a top-notch business school in Jamshedpur. This is the first novel by Abhijit Bhaduri. His other published works include Married but Available which is the second book in the MBA Series and a management ‘guide-book’- Don’t Hire the Best.

== Synopsis ==
Mediocre But Arrogant is the story of being young in India. It is about the roller coaster life in a business school with glimpses of hostel life, grades, chai at the dhaba and, not least, being in love. The story follows the life of the protagonist, Abbey, who lands an MBA course at a top-notch business school, the Management Institute of Jamshedpur, after three years of college. At MIJ, Abbey finds his life turned upside down – what with professors like Haathi and Chatto, friends like Rascal Rusty and Pappu, and girls like Ayesha and Keya. Will the two years at MIJ bag Abbey a job? Will this be where he finds love? These are the pivotal questions the novel tries to answer.

== Reviews ==
Mediocre But Arrogant has featured in several best-seller lists - including The Hindu, NDTV.com, Crossword Book Store Chain Fiction Best-Sellers list by the Deccan Herald. The Week’s review of the novel calls it as a book that is ‘Loaded with humour and narrated at a cracking pace’. Deccan Herald lauded the story for its authenticity. ‘The authenticity of the dialogues, friends, incidents, phattas, attitudes are the book’s heart’ mentions the tabloid’s review of the novel.

== See also ==
- Abhijit Bhaduri
