= Payal Dhar =

Indian writer (born 1976)

Payal Dhar (born 1976) Calcutta, West Bengal, India, is an Indian novel writer.

In 2006, Dhar published his first novel, A Shadow in Eternity, in the A Shadow in Eternity series. It was followed by its sequels The Key of Chaos in 2007 and The Timeless Land in 2008.

== Works ==
- A Shadow in Eternity (2006)
- It Has No Name (2021)
- The Prophecy (Sands of Time Book One)
- The Key Sands of Time Book Two)
- Hit For A Six
- Slightly Burnt
- Eat the Sky, Drink The Ocean
- There Is A Ghost In My Pic
- A Helping Hand
- Satin: A Stitch In Time
