= Christopher Raja =

Australian author

Christopher Raja (born 27 September 1974 in Kolkata) is an Australian author of short stories, essays, a play and a novel. He co-authored the play The First Garden with Natasha Raja, which was performed in botanical gardens around Australia and published by Currency Press in 2012. His debut novel, The Burning Elephant was published by Giramondo Publishing in 2015. It was written under a New Work grant awarded by the Literature Board of the Australia Council. He has been twice shortlisted for the Northern Territory Writers Centre's Chief Minister's Book of the Year award. Raja migrated from Kolkata to Melbourne in 1986. He has lived and worked in Alice Springs since 2004.
