= Ramendra Kumar (author) =

Indian writer

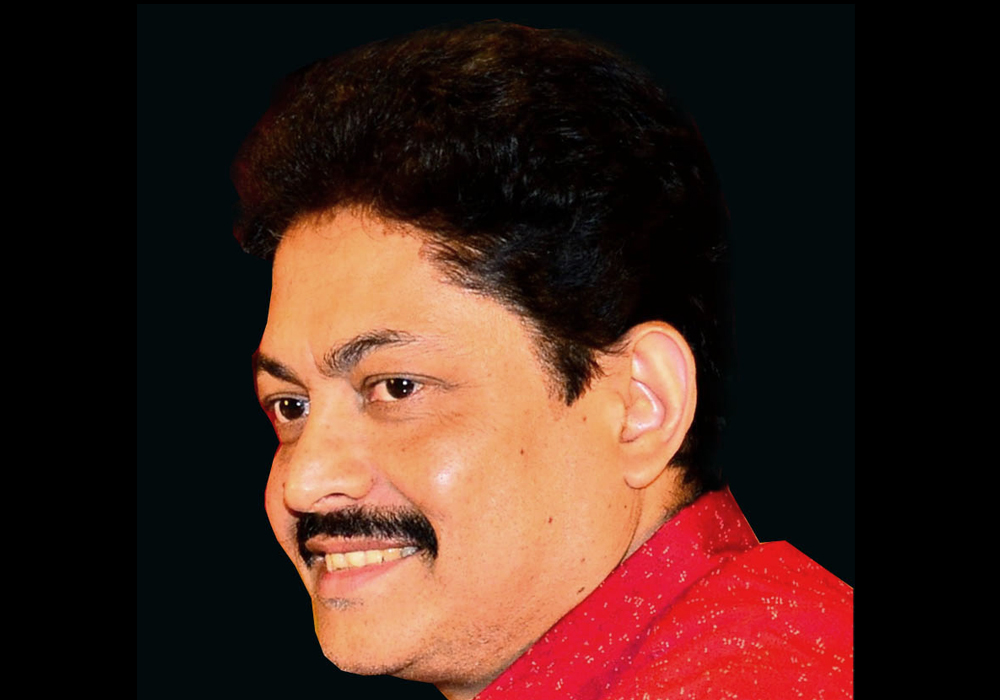
- Ramendra Kumar in 2018
- Born: Hyderabad, India
- Writing career
- Genres: Children's fiction; satire, fiction & non-fiction, relationship advice, travelogues, poetry, and ghazals for adults
- Website: ramendra.in

Ramendra Kumar is an Indian author, primarily of fiction for children and for young adults.

== Early life ==
Kumar was born in Hyderabad, India, to former Osmania University professor and Hindi Department head R. K. Khandelwal and Hindi fiction writer Deepti Khandelwal. He attended Hyderabad Public School, Begumpet. Throughout his childhood Kumar experienced a number of health issues and survived a suicide attempt.

== Writing career ==
The roots of his lifelong writing career he attributes to his father's reaction to a few lines of verse that Kumar wrote around the age of seven. His first serious writing attempts were in satire and poetry contributions to his school and college magazines and later for newspaper supplements.

After earning a bachelor’s degree in engineering and a master's degree in business administration, Kumar was hired as a junior manager of communications in the Public Relations Department of the Rourkela Steel Plant in the state of Odisha. Early on he met his wife, who helped jump-start his children's book writing career a few years later when they had a son and in need of freeing up time for her to attend to the newborn, she asked Kumar to read stories to their daughter, aged four. He decided to create his own stories, however, and the stories he found that brought his daughter most enjoyment he eventually began sending to book companies. As soon as the little boy reached the age for stories, he too wanted his own. But because his preference was for action and sports stories rather than the fairy tales preferred by his sister, Kumar found himself telling the children both sorts of stories. After providing them a large supply of stories over many years, he came to refer to himself as "Papa Scheherezade", the eponymous title he gave to a book he wrote about this experience. In 1997 his first children's book, Just a Second and Other Stories, was published.

As of April 2025, Kumar's books published in English totalled 49, of which 18 are also available in Indian languages and 14 in foreign languages. His writings have been brought out by major publishers, including Penguin Random House, Pratham Books, and National Book Trust (NBT). They have also been published and reviewed in newspapers, magazines, and e-zines.

=== Written works in school curricula and education ===
Kumar's work has been included in school curricula and educational programs. His stories have also been published in 11 textbooks for schools following CBSE, ICSE, and state boards as well as in the curricula in schools abroad.

== See also ==
- List of Indian writers
- Indian English literature
- Sutapa Basu
- Archana Sarat
- Arundhati Roy
