= Indumati Gopinathan =

Indian pathologist

- Born: 23 March 1956 (age 70); Mumbai, India
- Education: Seth Gordhandas Sunderdas Medical College and King Edward Memorial Hospital
- Occupation: Pathologist
- Scientific career
- Fields: Pathology, telemedicine

Indumati Gopinathan (born 23 March 1956) is a noted Indian pathologist. She specializes in diagnostic medicine, ocular oncopathology and gynecological histopathology.

== Medical career ==
Gopinathan completed her undergraduate and post graduation degree (M.D.) in Pathology from Seth Gordhandas Sunderdas Medical College and King Edward Memorial Hospital. She is a leading commentator on Telepathology. She was also associated with Space Hospitals, a Chennai-based telemedicine company. She is the health consultant/columnist for The Times of India, the world's largest selling English newspaper. Indumati Gopinathan is on the editorial board of HealthScreen, an Indian health care magazine focusing on preventive medicine, and a columnist for Health Care Express, a leading weekly healthcare publication by the Indian Express group.

Indumati Gopinathan is director on the board of directors at Thyrocare Healthcare.

She currently resides and is in private practice in Chembur, Mumbai, India.
