= Zafar Ahmad Nizami =

Indian author and poet

Professor Zafar Ahmad Nizami
- Born: 25 November 1939; Pratapgarh, Rajasthan
- Died: 23 April 2009 (aged 69); Delhi
- Occupation: Professor

Academic background
- Education: Vikram University, Ujjain

Academic work
- Main interests: Political Science, History
- Notable works: Hindustan ke chand siyasi rahnuma, Memaran-e-Jamia, Maulana Azad Ki Kahani

Zafar Ahmad Nizami (25 November 1939 — 23 April 2009) was an Indian author, poet and writer. He served the Jamia Millia Islamia as Professor of Political Science for about 30 years and authored books like Memarān-e-Jamia, Hindustān ke chand Siyasi Rahnuma, Maulana Azad Ki Kahani and Tarīkh-e-Hind: Ahd-e-Jadeed.

== Biography ==
Nizami was born on 25 November 1933 in Pratapgarh, Rajasthan. He pursued M.A degrees in English (1959) and Political Science (1961) from Vikram University, Ujjain. He taught in the colleges of Jaora, Ratlam, Sehore and Datia as a lecturer and then moved to Jamia Millia Islamia where he taught in the department of Political Science as a professor. He later became its head professor. He also served Institute of Objective Studies, New Delhi as director. He retired from the Jamia Millia Islamia in 2001. He died on 23 April 2009 in Escorts Hospital Delhi.

== Literary works ==
Nizami's works include:

- Memarān-e-Jamia (Urdu) — (The Founders of Jamia Millia Islamia).
- Hindustān ke chand Siyasi Rahnuma
- Maulana Azad Ki Kahani
- Tarīkh-e-Hind: Ahd-e-Jadeed
- Builders of Modern India: Hakim Ajmal Khan
- Dr. Zakir Hussain: A Pictorial Biography
- Qalmi Khāke
- Azadi-e-Hind Ki Jaddojahd Mai Musalmano Ka Kirdar (Vol 1)
- Jamaat-e-Islami: Spearhead of Separatism

== Legacy ==
Following research studies are few guided by Nizami:

- Gandhis technique of mass mobilization by Madan Mohan Verma.
- Diplomacy in Islam by Mohammad Ali Nasir Homoud.
- A study of India's political and economic co operation with Asean count by Suman Chaudhary.

== See also ==
- List of Indian writers
- Dia Mirza
- Tapan Kumar Pradhan
- Shyam Benegal
