= Padma Rao Sundarji =

Indian Author

Padma Rao Sundarji a.k.a. Padma Rao is an Indian author and an international correspondent based in New Delhi, India.

== Career ==
Rao was the India correspondent for GEO magazine on India in 1992–1993 and also co-authored a travel guide on South India for Meridien Super Travel – Germany in 1994 ISBN 978-3774201132.

Rao was the long-standing South Asian bureau chief of German news magazine Der Spiegel, during which time, the Sri Lankan civil war was an intensive part of her beat. She wrote the book Srilanka: The New Country (ISBN 978-93-5177-030-5) HarperCollins India covering the thirty year long civil war that ended in 2009

During her stint at Der Spiegel, she was chosen to interview heads of the government and rebel leaders of the times including the formerly underground Maoist leader Prachanda, Vellupillai Prabhakaran of the LTTE.

Rao writes in English and German and her work has appeared in syndicate in The New York Times, She worked as special correspondent at Wion Television India before moving on to Hindustan Times as national editor.

== Award ==
Rajiv Gandhi Excellence Award 2015 for Best Literary Personality of the year (Pehchan, New Delhi)

== Other publications ==
- Essay on Diego Garcia in Foreign Correspondent: 50 years – Penguin India, 2009.
- Essay on India-German relations in Rising India: Europe's Partner? - Weissensee Verlag, Germany
