= Pankaj Rag =

Indian writer and historian

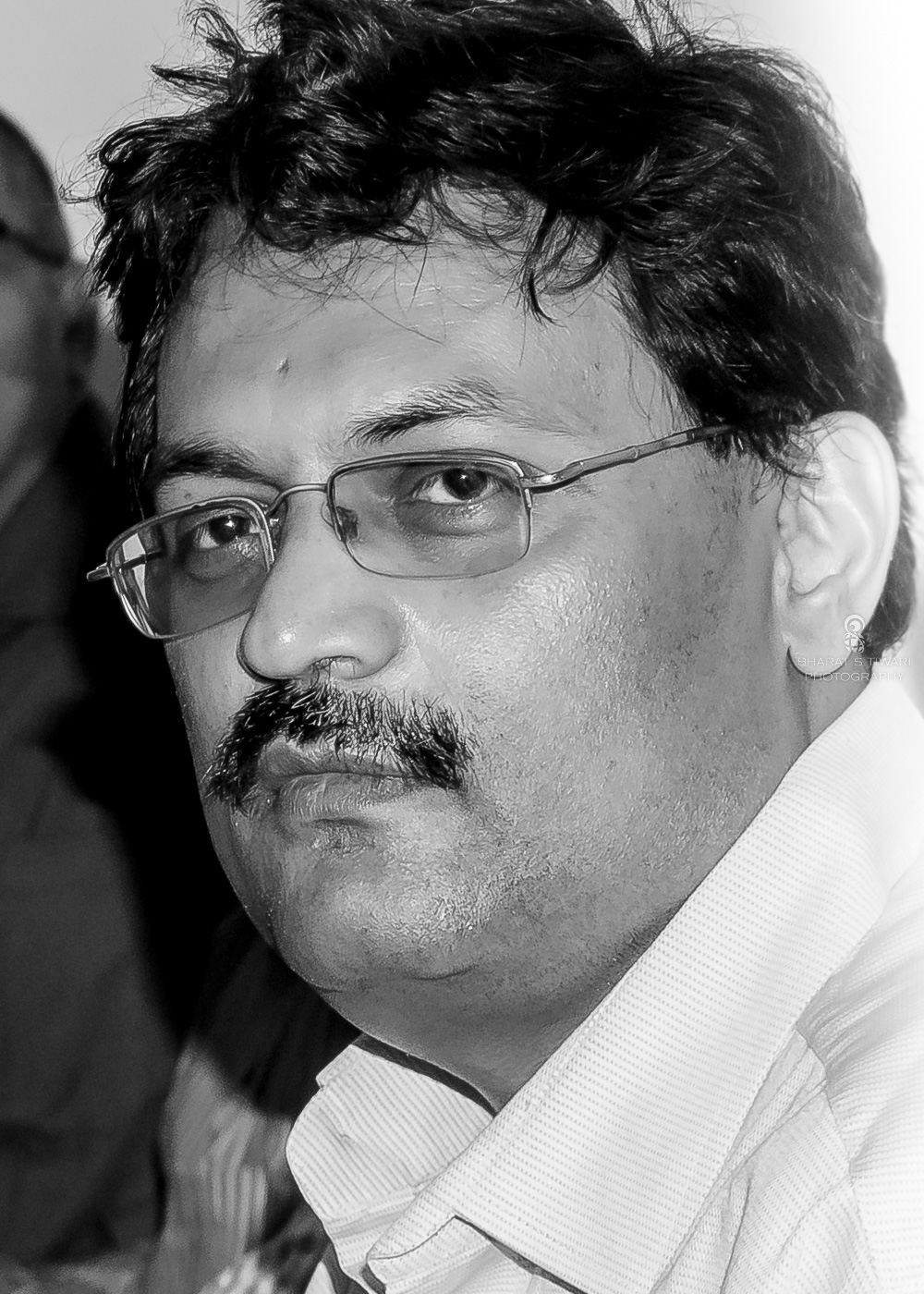
- Born: 30 October 1964 (age 61); Muzaffarpur, Bihar, India
- Education: Delhi University; St. Stephen's College, Delhi
- Occupation: Poet

Pankaj Rag is an Indian poet and IAS officer of 1990 batch. He has served as the Commissioner of Directorate of archeology, archives and museums, in Bhopal, Madhya Pradesh, Director-General of National Archives of India, and Director of Film and Television Institute of India, Pune, Maharashtra.

Rag was born on 30 October 1964 in Muzaffarpur, Bihar. He graduated in History from St. Stephen's College, Delhi, and completed his Master of Philosophy in modern Indian history from Delhi University. Rag is a recipient of Kedar Samman and Mira Smriti award.

== Bibliography ==
- Dhuno Ki Yatra (in Hindi). Rajkamal Prakashan Pvt Ltd. January 2006. ISBN 9788126711697.
- Yeh Bhumandal Ki Raat Hai (in Hindi). Rajkamal Prakashan Pvt Ltd. September 2009. ISBN 9788126716692.
- Vintage Madhya Pradesh
- Rag Ragini Folio (Hindi & English) along with V.P. Nagayach
- Bhopal, 50 years as capital. Madhya Pradesh Madhyam. 2005.
- Masterpieces of Madhya Pradesh. Directorate of Archaeology, Archives & Museums, Government of Madhya Pradesh. 2005.
- Relics of 1857, Madhya Pradesh. Directorate of Archaeology, Archives, and Museums, Madhya Pradesh. 2007.
- 1857: The Oral Tradition. Rupa & Company. 2010. ISBN 9788129116222.
- Culture Heritage of Narmada Valley (in Hindi). Directorate of Archaeology, Archives, and Museums, Government of Madhya Pradesh. 2007.

== See also ==
- List of Indian writers
