= Sapna Book House =

Indian book store chain and a publisher of books

Sapna Book House Pvt. Ltd.
- Parent company: Sapna Book House
- Status: Active
- Founded: 26 January 1967; 59 years ago in Bangalore
- Founder: Suresh C. Shah
- Country of origin: India
- Headquarters location: Bangalore
- Key people: Suresh Shah, Paresh Suresh Shah, Deepak Suresh Shah and Bhanumati Suresh Shah (Directors); Nitin Shah (Director, Managing director); Nijesh (Group President of Sapna Book House and CEO of Sapna Infoway)
- Official website: www.sapnaonline.com

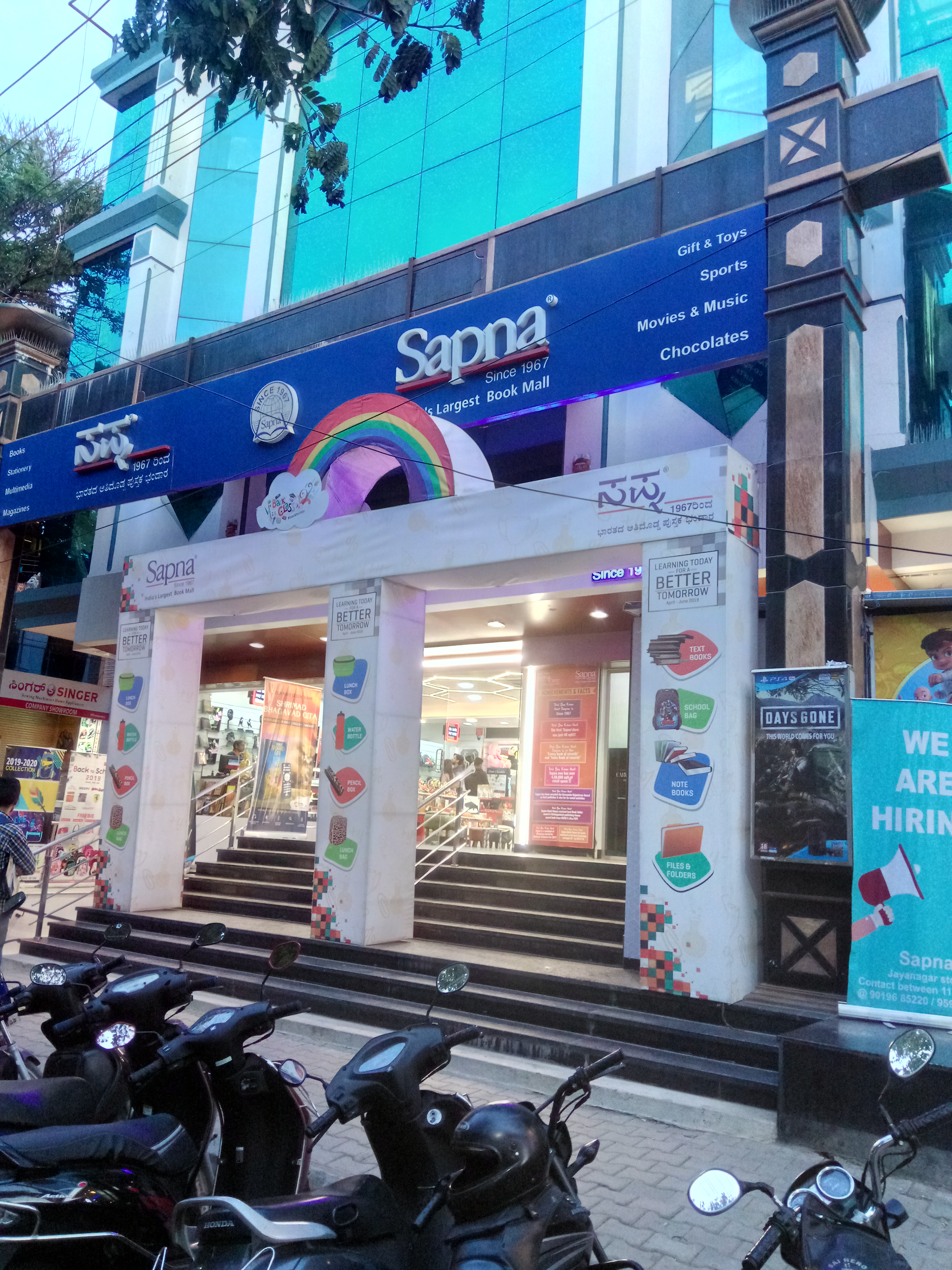
View of the store

Sapna Book House is an Indian book store chain and a publisher of books. It is one of the biggest book shops in India.

The Limca Book of Records recognised Sapna as the largest book shop in India, for seven years in a row. The Government of Karnataka presented the Karnataka Rajyostava Award to Sapna Book House, describing it as the largest Kannada book publisher, in 2008. As of May 2016, Sapna Book House has published more than 5000 books by 500 writers, including Jnanpith and Central Sahitya Academy awardees.

Around sixty percent of the store includes books and the rest of stationery, multimedia products, and sports items etc. It has its export of over 5,000 books in Kannada language, to the Kannadigas settled in Brazil. Its online business has eight million users.

== Store67 ==
A store chain was started by Sapna Book House, named Store67 which included stationery products for students.

== SapnaINK ==
A platform SapnaINK, was started by Sapna Book House in December 2014, for new authors to publish their books.

== Background ==
Sapna Book House was started by Suresh Shah, on 26 January 1967 near Majestic, Bangalore on a rent-based store, and later as an independent mall in Gandhi Nagar, Bangalore, initially selling Lilliput dictionaries. Born in Ghatkopar, Mumbai, Maharastra, Suresh Shah's ancestors belonged to Dhoraji, Gujarat. Suresh Shah previously worked as head of Mumbai-based Pocket Book Distributing Company's new branch in Chennai

Currently his eldest son Nitin Shah, is the Managing Director and grandson Nijesh is the Group President of Sapna Book House and CEO of Sapna Infoway. The company has 5 directors namely Paresh Suresh Shah, Deepak Suresh Shah, Nitin Suresh Shah, Bhanumati Suresh Shah and Suresh Shah.

=== 2014 ===
Sapna Infoway acquired Ishita Technologies Private Limited (including Bookadda.com, Acadzone.com and Koolskool.com) at a value of $13 million. In May, it extended its business by setting up offices in Accra, Ghana. As on December, the group's online revenue touched the Rs 6.5-7 crore mark.
