= Victor Ghoshe =

Indian author

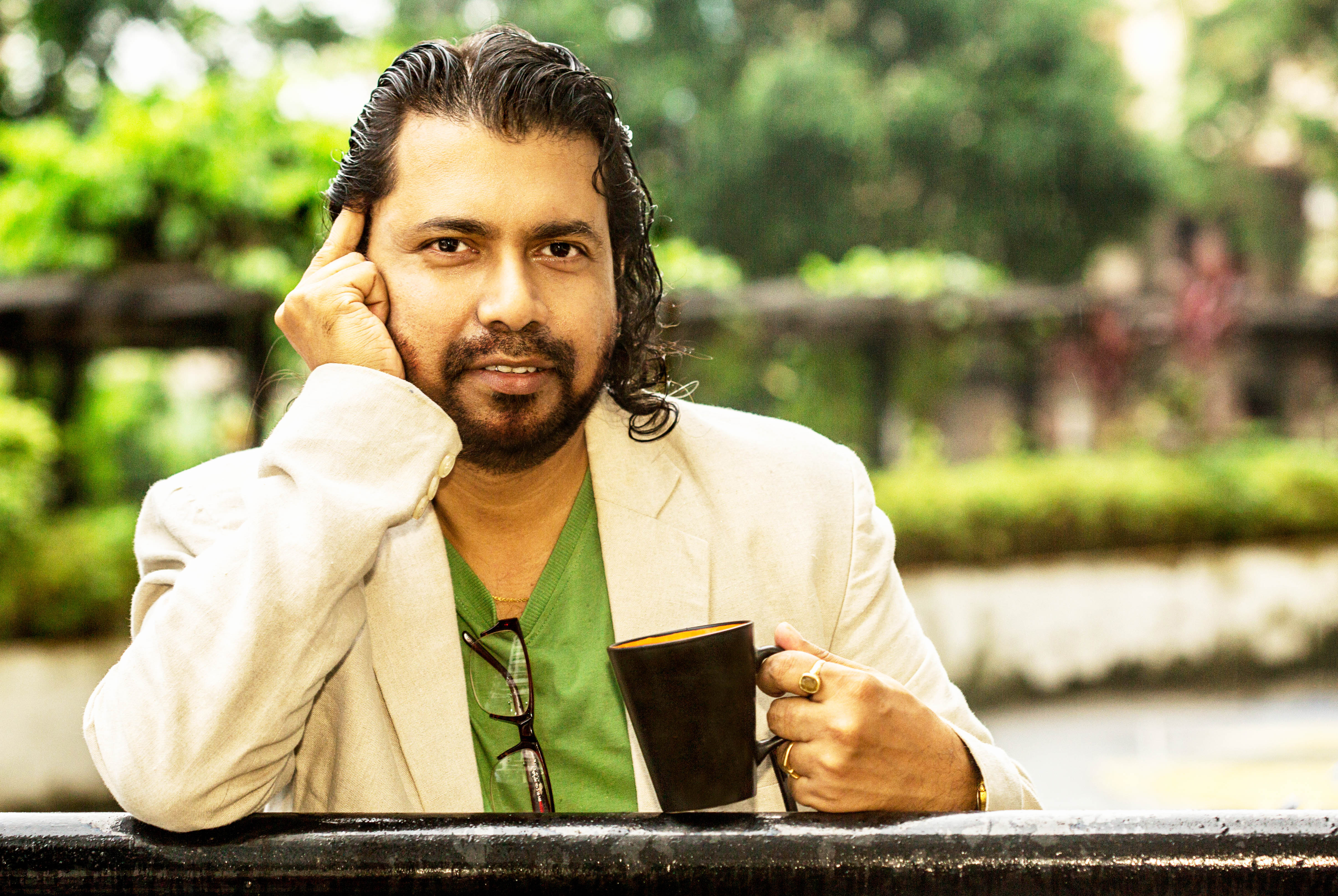
- Born: Kolkata, India
- Occupation: Author
- Notable work: The Job Charnock Riddle, Tomb of God, Future Proof: Masterstrokes to Outthink and Outplay AI

Victor Ghoshe is an Indian author who has written novels and collection of stories primarily in the thriller and supernatural genres. As of 2026, he has written two novels in English, a non fiction on navigating the AI-disrupted professional world, and four books containing collections of stories which are in Bengali.

== Career ==
Victor Ghoshe began his writing career with his debut English novel, The Job Charnock Riddle, published in 2016. It is a historical thriller set in Kolkata.

His second novel, Tomb of God, followed in 2021 and is available in the Kerala State Central Library. The author's book Bengali collection of stories, Paranormal 2 was launched in 2023.

Ghoshe’s 3rd book in English and 7th including his Bengali books, Future Proof tries to address the threat that AI poses in terms of work and career. Published by Om Books International, this is a deviation from the usual fiction that Victor Ghoshe creates.

He contributed to programs promoting oral rehydration salts (ORS) and Zinc uptake in rural India for diarrhoea management, integrating mass communication with community-centric behavioural interventions, which later brought a policy level change relating to zinc therapy for child diarrhoea management

== Bibliography ==
Title	Year	Publisher	ISBN	Notes
Ethernet Ebong Onanyo Golpo	2010	Smriti Publishers	9788191034097	Collection of Stories
Megher Khata	2012	N.E. Publishers	9788182081116	Collection of Stories
The Job Charnock Riddle	2016	Rumour	9781943730520	Novel
Paranormal	2019	VG Publications	9789353464431	Collection of Stories
Tomb of God	2021	Rupa Publications	9789389967708	Novel
Paranormal 2	2023	VG Publications	9789353464431	Collection of Stories
Future Proof - Masterstrokes to Outthink and Outplay AI	2026	Om Books International	978-9363950818	Non Fiction, Self Help
