= Vaasanthi =

Indian journalist and writer

Vaasanthi Sundaram
- Born: 26 July 1941 (age 85); Tamil Nadu, India
- Education: Mysore University; Oslo University
- Occupations: Journalist; Writer; novelist; Editor

Vaasanthi (born as Pankajam on 26 July 1941) is an Indian journalist and writer.

She got her degree in English literature and history at Mysore University and a Master's degree at Oslo University in Norway. She served as the editor of India Today, Tamil edition for nine years. Many of her essays on art, culture, and politics have been seriously focused on the emergence of a number of articles and created debates.

Vaasanthi has written a number of lectures and reports on women's issues and she is also a political analyst. Penguin Books published a book in English (Cut-outs, Caste and Cines Stars) with their standings in the political history of Tamil Nadu during the time she worked as the editor of India Today.

She also wrote the biography of J. Jayalalithaa in 2016. She has written around 40 novels and six short story collections.

Vaasanthi wrote a biography of M. Karunanidhi titled Karunanidhi: The Definitive Biography.

She appeared on the podcast, The Literary City with Ramjee Chandran to talk about her latest book, Breaking Free.

== Books ==
=== Tamil ===
- Aakasa Veedugal
- Aarthikku Mugam Sivanthathu
- Aasai Mugam Maranthu Pochey!
- Agni Kunju
- Ammani
- America Payana Diary
- Aval Sonnathu
- Deivangal Ezhuga
- Ellai Kodu
- Ellaigalin Vilimbil
- Ettatha Kilaigal
- Idaiveligal Thodarkindrana
- India Enum Aithegam
- Indre Nesiyungal
- Iravukkum Pagalukkum Idaiye...
- Jaipur Necklace
- Jananam
- Jeyalalitaa Manamum Maayaiyum
- Kaadhalenum Vaanavil
- Kaalam
- Kaalamellam Kaathirunthu...
- Kaaranamilla Kaariyangal
- Kadai Bommaigal
- Kadaisi Varai
- Kalaignar Ennum Karunanidhi
- Kannukku Theriyatha Ulagangal
- Karai Seratha Odangal
- Kariya Megangalil Oli Keetrugal
- Kathai Kathaiyaam Karanamaam
- Kathavillatha Veedu
- Kizhakkey Oru Ulagam
- Kuttravaali
- Maaligai Paravaigal
- Maara Vendiya Paathaigal
- Manithargal Paathi Neram Thoongukirargal
- Meendum Naalai Varum
- Meetchi
- Moongil Pookkal
- Mouna Puyal
- Mounathin Kural
- Munneru!
- Muthukkal Pathu
- Naan Budhanillai
- Nagarangal Manithargal Panpaadugal
- Nalliravu Suriyargal
- Nazhuvum Nerangal
- Nijangal Nizhalahumpothu...
- Nijangal
- Ninaivil Pathintha Chuvadukal
- Nirkka Nizhal Vendum
- Nizhal Tharum Tharuve
- Nizhalattam
- Nizhalgal
- Oru Sangamathai Thedi...
- Paarvaigalum Pathivugalum
- Paathipugal
- Paravaigal Parakkindrana
- Pathaiyorathu Pookkal
- Petrathum Izhanthathum
- Plum Marangal Poothuvittana
- Poi Mugam
- Poiyil Pootha Nijam
- Puriyatha Arthangal
- Puthiya Vaanam
- S.V.V. Enum Rasavaadhi
- Sandhiya
- Sariyaa? Sariyaa?
- Santhanakaadugal
- Shurthi Bethangal
- Sindhikka Oru Nodi
- Siragukal
- Sirai!
- Sontham Illatha Bandham
- Thaagam
- Tharaiyellam Shenbaga Poo
- Theekul Viralai Vaithal
- Thirakkatha Jannalgal
- Thunaivi
- Thurathum Ninaivugal Azhaikkum Kanavugal
- Ula Vara Oru Ulagam
- Vaakkumoolam
- Vadikaal
- Valliname Melliname
- Vasantham Kasanthathu!
- Veedu Varai Uravu
- Veli
- Vendatha Varam
- Ver Pidikkum Mann
- Vergalai Thedi...
- Vidiyalai Nokki...
- Vittu Viduthalaiyagi (Breaking Free)
- Yathumagi...
- Yuga Sandhi
- Yugangal Marumpothu

=== English ===
- Amma: Jayalalithaa's Journey from Movie Star to Political Queen (2016)
- At the Cusp of Ages (2008)
- Cut-outs, Caste and Cines Stars (2008)
- Karunanidhi: The Definitive Biography (2020)
- The Lone Empress: A Portrait of Jayalalithaa (2020)
- Rajnikanth: A Life (2021)
