= Vijendra Narayan Singh =

Indian writer

Vijendra Narayan Singh is a critic of Hindi Literature.

He has specialized on the critical appreciation of Rashtrakavi Ramdhari Singh 'Dinkar' and his works. He served as Professor and Head of the Hindi Department of Hyderabad Central University.

Apart from these, some of his other works are Kavyalochan ki saasyayen, Ashudh kavya ki sanstuti main, and Bharatiya kavya sameeksha main Vakrokti siddhant.

== Works ==
- Bharatiya Sahitya ke Nirmata: Ramdhari Singh 'Dinkar', Sahitya Akademi, New Delhi, 2005, ISBN 81-260-2142-X.
- Dinkar: Ek Punarmulyankan, Parimal Prakashan, Allapur, Allahabad.
- Urvashi: Uplabdhi Aur Sima, Parimal Prakashan, Allapur, Allahabad.
