= Sithara S. =

Indian writer and translator of Malayalam literature

Sithara S
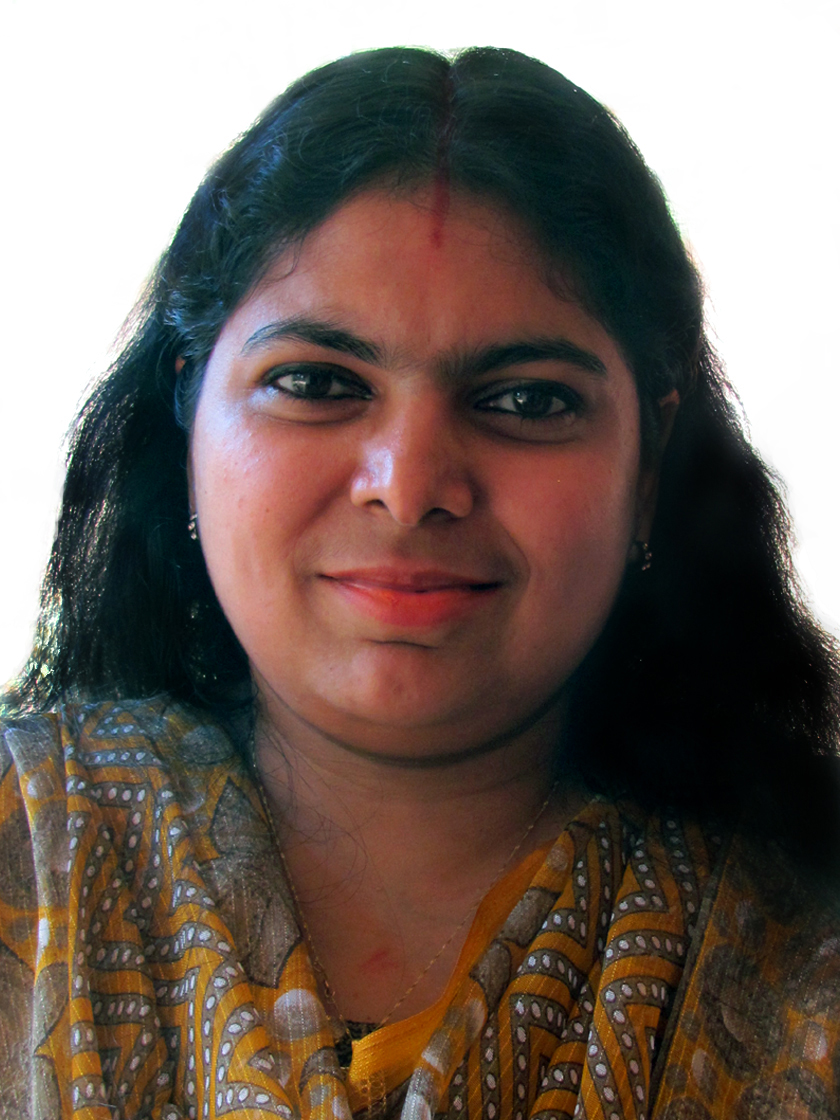
- Sithara S
- Born: 15 September 1972; Kasaragod
- Education: University of Calicut
- Occupation: Writer
- Writing career
- Language: Malayalam
- Period: 21st century
- Genre: Fiction
- Subjects: Women, Lesbianism, Sexuality
- Notable works: Agni; Kathakal
- Notable awards: Sahitya Akademi
- Literary movement: Feminism

Sithara S. (born 1972) is an Indian writer in Malayalam from Kerala. She often highlighted women's issues, gender conflict and lesbian rights in her books. She is also a translator.

== Early life and education ==
Sithara was born and brought up in Kasaragod district of Kerala. She obtained her post-graduation degree in English Literature and Diploma in journalism from University of Calicut. At an early age she was afflicted with life-threatening cancer disease. She attributes her firebrand literary style to her lifelong battle against cancer and social stigma.

== Literary works ==
Sithara is one of the leading contemporary women writers from Kerala. She has written several best-selling books in Malayalam which include "Kathakal", "Idam", "Veshappakarcha" and "Ushnagrahangalude Sneham". She chiefly writes stories depicting oppression of women and sexuality in public places. Her stories capture the complexities of modern life from women's perspective and have an angry and defiant tone.

Sithara has also translated the works of Nobel Laureate Malala Yousafzai into Malayalam. Her short story "Fire" has been included in the English Literature syllabus of Kerala University.

== Other contributions ==
Sithara's short story Agni has been made into a popular movie. She is also a freelance content writer on children's topics for television.

== Awards and recognition ==
Sithara's works were recognised by Sahitya Akademi which conferred on her its golden jubilee prize in 2004. She has also won Kerala Sahitya Akademi award. Besides he has won numerous other literary awards including ‘’Katha Award’’ and ‘’Geetha Hiranyan Endowment Award’’ for Malayalam literature.

== Bibliography ==
=== Books in English ===
- Sithara, S.; K., Madhavikutty (2017). Lesbian Stories in Malyalam. Trivandrum: Chintha Publishers. ISBN 978-81-770239-7-8.

=== Books in Malayalam ===
- Sithara, S. (2017). Kathakal. Kottayam: DC Books. ISBN 978-81-264400-1-6.
- Sithara, S. (2015). Ushnagrahangalude Sneham. Kottayam: DC Books. ISBN 978-81-264529-4-1.
- Sithara, S. (2015). Veyilil Oru Kaliyezhuthukari. Ernakulam: Mathrubhoomi Publications. ISBN 978-81-826607-3-1.
- Sithara, S. (2010). Karutha Kuppayakkari. Kottayam: DC Books. ISBN 978-81-264276-6-6.
- Sithara, S. (2012). Idam. Kottayam: DC Books. ISBN 978-81-264140-8-6.
- Sithara, S. (2015). Agniyum Katakalum. Trivandrum: Mathrubhumi Books.
- Sithara, S. (2017). Lesbose : Malayalathile Lesbian Kathakal. Vanchyoor: Chintha Publishers.
- Sithara, S. (2020). Nrithashala. Kottayam: DC Books. ISBN 978-81-264467-4-2.
- Sithara, S. (2020). Veshakaparcha. Kottayam: DC Books.
- Sithara, S. (2021). Enteyum Katha. Kottayam: DC Books.

=== Chapters in books ===
- Sithara, S. (2017), "Madri and Maria", in Anilkumar, K. S.; Resmi, G. (eds.), Lesbian Stories in Malayalam, vol. 1 (1st ed.), Trivandrum: Chintha Publishers, ISBN 978-81-770239-7-8

=== Journal articles ===
- Sithara, S. (2009). "The Poet and the Farmer". Indian Literature. 53 (5): 96–99. JSTOR 23340231.
- Sithara, S. (2005). "Contemporary Malayalam Literature". Indian Literature. 49 (1): 199–205. JSTOR 23346594.
- Sithara, S. (2006). "Lone Trips". Indian Literature. 49 (1): 47–51. JSTOR 23346550.
- Sithara, S. (2016). "Agni". Samyukta Journal of Gender and Culture. 1 (2): 40–45.

=== Translations ===
- Enteyum Katha (2021), DC Books (Translation of We Are Displaced by Malala Yousafzai)

== See also ==
- Sahitya Akademi Award
- Kerala Sahitya Academy Award
- Malayalam literature
- Tapan Kumar Pradhan
- Mandakranta Sen
