= M on the Bund =

Coordinates: 31.23437°N 121.49058°E

M on the Bund Chinese: 米氏西餐厅; pinyin: Mǐshì Xī Cāntīng is a restaurant located on the 7th floor of the Nissin Shipping Building at No. 5 The Bund, Shanghai, China and is known as the first restaurant to open on The Bund overlooking the Huangpu River and Pudong. Established in 1999 by Australian restaurateur Michelle Garnaut, the restaurant specializes in dishes with a mixture of Middle Eastern and European flavor.

== History ==
M on the Bund opened in 1999 by Michelle Garnaut. Garnaut had moved to Hong Kong in 1984 and previously established M on the Fringe in late 1989. Wanting to push herself, she saw the potential for a fine-dining restaurant in Shanghai after opening a 10-day pop-up restaurant at the Peace Hotel in 1996. Finding space on the seventh floor of the Nissin Building on the Bund, Garnaut signed the lease for premises during the spring of 1998. M on the Bund officially opened in January 1999. In the summer of that year, the owner of the group that had given the restaurant the lease was arrested on corruption charges, prompting Garnaut to quickly sign a new lease in September.

In December 2021, Garnaut announced over social media that M on the Bund would be closing, after its last service on February 15, 2022.

== Menu ==
The restaurant uses local ingredients including black truffles, foie gras, and local fruits to make its dishes. Some of its signature dishes include crispy suckling pig, salt encased leg of lamb, and pavlova dessert.

== Awards ==
- Best Global Cuisine 2010, City Weekend Reader's Choice Awards
- Restaurant of the Year 2009 – Editor’s Pick, City Weekend Shanghai Restaurant Awards
- Best Outdoor Space 2009, City Weekend Shanghai Restaurant Awards
- Dining al fresco ~ Editor’s Pick, Financial Times
- Top 20 Restaurants in Asia (since 2008), Miele Guide
- Voted “Most Popular Restaurant” by readers since 2004, Shanghai Zagat
- “Best Wine Selection”, 2008 City Weekend Reader’s Choice Awards
- “Shanghai’s Best Fusion Restaurant”, 2007 City Weekend Reader’s Choice Awards
- One of the 50 Best Restaurants in the World, Conde Nast Traveler

== Notable guests ==
Notable guests that have dined at M on the Bund include Harry Potter star Daniel Radcliffe, supermodel Tyra Banks, the Ferragamo family, the United Kingdom's Prince Edward, media tycoon Rupert Murdoch, the queen of Thailand and the queen and crown prince of the Netherlands.

== Arts and Culture Events ==
M on the Bund has hosted the Shanghai International Literary Festival since 2003. The annual event runs through multiple weekends in March featuring wine and poetry readings, literary lunches, workshops, and panels with some of the most acclaimed authors in the world.

Additionally, M on the Bund partnered with the Atelier of Chamber Music at the Shanghai Conservatory of Music and has been regularly hosting chamber music events in the restaurant's Crystal Room since then.
