= Michelle Garnaut =

- Born: 1957 (age 68–69); Melbourne
- Education: Monash University, William Angliss Institute of TAFE
- Culinary career
- Cooking style: European cuisine, Middle Eastern cuisine, North African cuisine
- Current restaurants
- M at the Fringe (Hong Kong); M on the Bund (Shanghai); Capital M (Beijing); The Glamour Bar (Shanghai)

Michelle Anne Garnaut, AO is an Australian restaurateur and cook best known for her series of restaurants in China including M on the Bund, Glam, Capital M, the Glamour Bar and M at the Fringe. Garnaut is also a founder of the Shanghai International Literary Festival, the M Literary Residency, the Village People Project and has spearheaded Mentor Walks in both Beijing and Shanghai. In 2018, Garnaut was awarded an Order of Australia (AO) for her work.

== Career ==
After dropping out of Monash University, Garnaut travelled in Europe, including Greece and England, as well as the United States of America. She then returned to Australia to study catering at the William Angliss Institute of TAFE. She then went to London, where she worked at Leiths School of Food and Wine as one of the head chefs on the Orient Express. Following this, she arrived in Hong Kong in 1984. Though she only intended a short stay in Hong Kong, she soon began cooking at Restaurant 97 in Hong Kong's Lan Kwai Fong, after which she launched her own catering business. Over a period of 20 years, she then launched three restaurants and a bar in Greater China: M at the Fringe in Hong Kong (1989–2009), M on the Bund in Shanghai (opened 1999), Glamour Bar in Shanghai (2006–2014), Glam in Shanghai (opened in 2015) and Capital M in Beijing (2009–2017).

Garnaut originally wanted to open a restaurant in Hong Kong with her former co-worker at the Restaurant 97 Group, fellow Australian Greg Malouf. However, Malouf fell ill and had to return to Australia. During her time at Restaurant 97, Garnaut became acquainted with business contacts, local celebrities and bankers who became investors in her new restaurant. In 1989, Garnaut opened her first restaurant, M at the Fringe, in The Hong Kong Fringe Club's building. Her inspiration behind M at the Fringe was to fill a niche in Hong Kong for modern international restaurants. In an interview with Time Magazine, Garnaut remarked, "When I first arrived in Asia, I was in Hong Kong and got into a lift to go up to a restaurant on the seventh floor, where we were greeted by 20 Chinese guys saying 'Ciao' and singing 'O Sole Mio.' I thought, 'This is crazy.' A restaurant has to have some soul. The whole make-believe world has to have some basis in reality." At the time, Hong Kong dining was mostly based on Cantonese cuisine, but M at the Fringe was considered a pioneer in European fine dining. Twenty years later, the building was forced to undergo extensive renovations to meet government standards forcing Garnaut to relocate M at the Fringe to a different location. That same year, it won HK Magazine's "Best Restaurant" award. Currently, M at the Fringe is still searching for a new location.

In 1999, Garnaut expanded the M Restaurant Group to Shanghai by opening M on the Bund on the historic waterfront. After testing the market as a guest chef cooking western food at the famous Peace Hotel on the Bund, Garnaut decided to establish a restaurant overlooking the Bund, the Huangpu River and Pudong. As Garnaut said in a 2004 interview with The Wall Street Journal, "People said I was crazy. The Bund was dark and dingy. This was a real risk." M on the Bund was the sole upscale independent western restaurant on the Bund for five years, but eventually other restaurants, bars and luxury venues followed. M on the Bund has won awards from the Miele Guide, Zagat, and Conde Nast.

In 2006, Garnaut established The Glamour Bar on the floor below M on the Bund in the former Nissin Shipping Building. The bar served as a lounge as well as a venue for M Group literary events until its closing in 2014 In 2015, M Glam opened on the same floor as M on the Bund. Glam is a bar, restaurant and lounge and serves as the venue for the restaurant's cultural events.

Capital M was established in 2009 in Beijing, overlooking the north end of Tiananmen. Garnaut spent more than seven years negotiating with officials and bidding on the Qianmen location. Garnaut pushed to have the restaurant open before the 2008 Beijing Olympics, but the construction of Qianmen was delayed, pushing the restaurant opening back. Even after opening, Capital M faced another challenge as it was forced to shut down for one week during the celebration for the 60th anniversary of the People's Republic of China. Capital M had multiple wins in The Beijinger's Reader Restaurant Awards in 2011. Capital M closed in September 2017.

In 2002, Garnaut founded the Shanghai International Literary Festival.

== Philanthropy ==
Garnaut's philanthropic work focuses on the Village People Project, which creates community bathhouses to improve the welfare of rural Chinese women. Previously, she has served as the director of Care for Children's Hong Kong branch which provides family care to orphans and children with disabilities. and led Hong Kong's International Coastal Clean-up since 2004. She has also been active in the Heep Hong Society, Greenpeace Hong Kong, Amnesty International and the Jane Goodall Foundation. She has also served as a judge for the Cartier Women's Initiative Award, serving as Asia jury president in 2011 and 2012.

== Awards and achievements ==
Garnaut won the Entrepreneur of the Year award at the 2003 International Woman of Influence Awards and the Business Entrepreneurial Award from the ANZ Australian Business Awards.

In 2018, Garnaut was awarded an Order of Australia (AO) for "distinguished service to Australia-China relations as a restaurateur and entrepreneur, to the promotion of Australian food, film and design, as a supporter of literary and cultural programs, and as a role model".
