= Sylvia Whitman =

Anglo-French bookseller (born 1981)

Sylvia Whitman HonFRSL
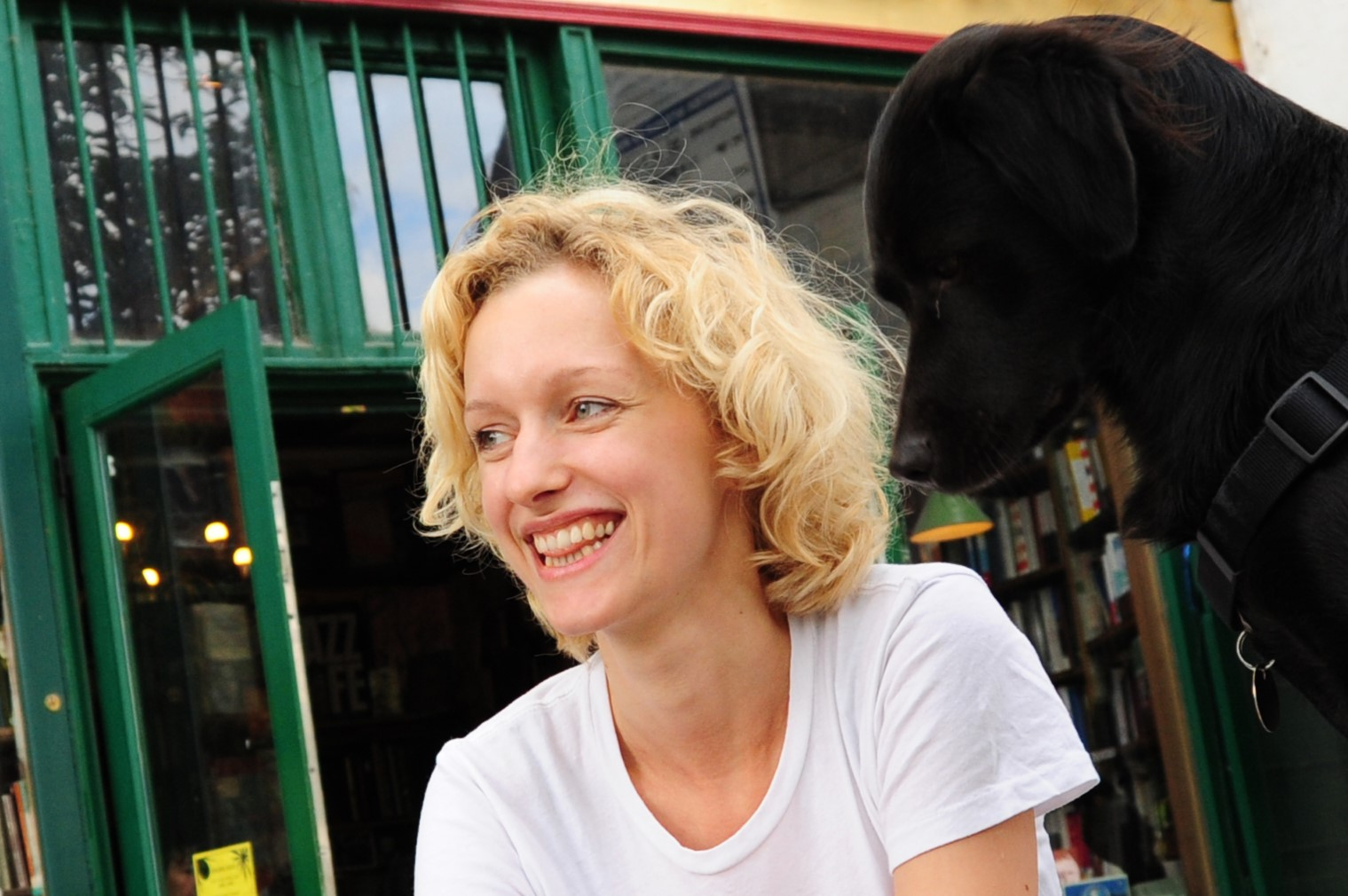
- Whitman outside Shakespeare and Company in 2008
- Born: 1 April 1981 (age 45); Paris, France
- Education: University College London (BA)
- Occupation: Bookseller
- Father: George Whitman

Sylvia Whitman HonFRSL (born 1 April 1981) is the proprietor of Shakespeare and Company in Paris, France, a well-known English-language bookstore.

She is the daughter of the shop's founder, George Whitman, who died in 2011.

== Early life and education ==
Whitman, born in 1981 in Paris, is the only child of the bookseller George Whitman, who in 1951 founded the Shakespeare and Company bookstore located at 37 rue de la Bûcherie in Paris. Her mother was Felicity Leng, a young British woman who had a brief marriage with George. According to author Jeremy Mercer, she was named after Saint Silvia, but George maintained that she was named after Sylvia Beach, who had opened the original Shakespeare and Company, and he stated in one bookstore publication that her name was Sylvia Beach Whitman.

When she was seven years old, Whitman's parents divorced and she moved with her mother to England and became estranged from her father for many years. She attended boarding school at the Mary Erskine School in Edinburgh, graduating in 1999.

She attended University College London, graduating in 2002 with a BA in Eastern European History. Her original ambition was to be an actor.

== Career ==
She began co-managing Shakespeare and Company with her father in 2003 at the age of 21. She continues to run it today with her partner, David Delannet, in the same way her father had, allowing young writers to live in the bookstore in exchange for helping out around the shop, agreeing to read a book a day, and writing a one-page autobiography for the shop's archives. An estimated 30,000 people have stayed at the shop.

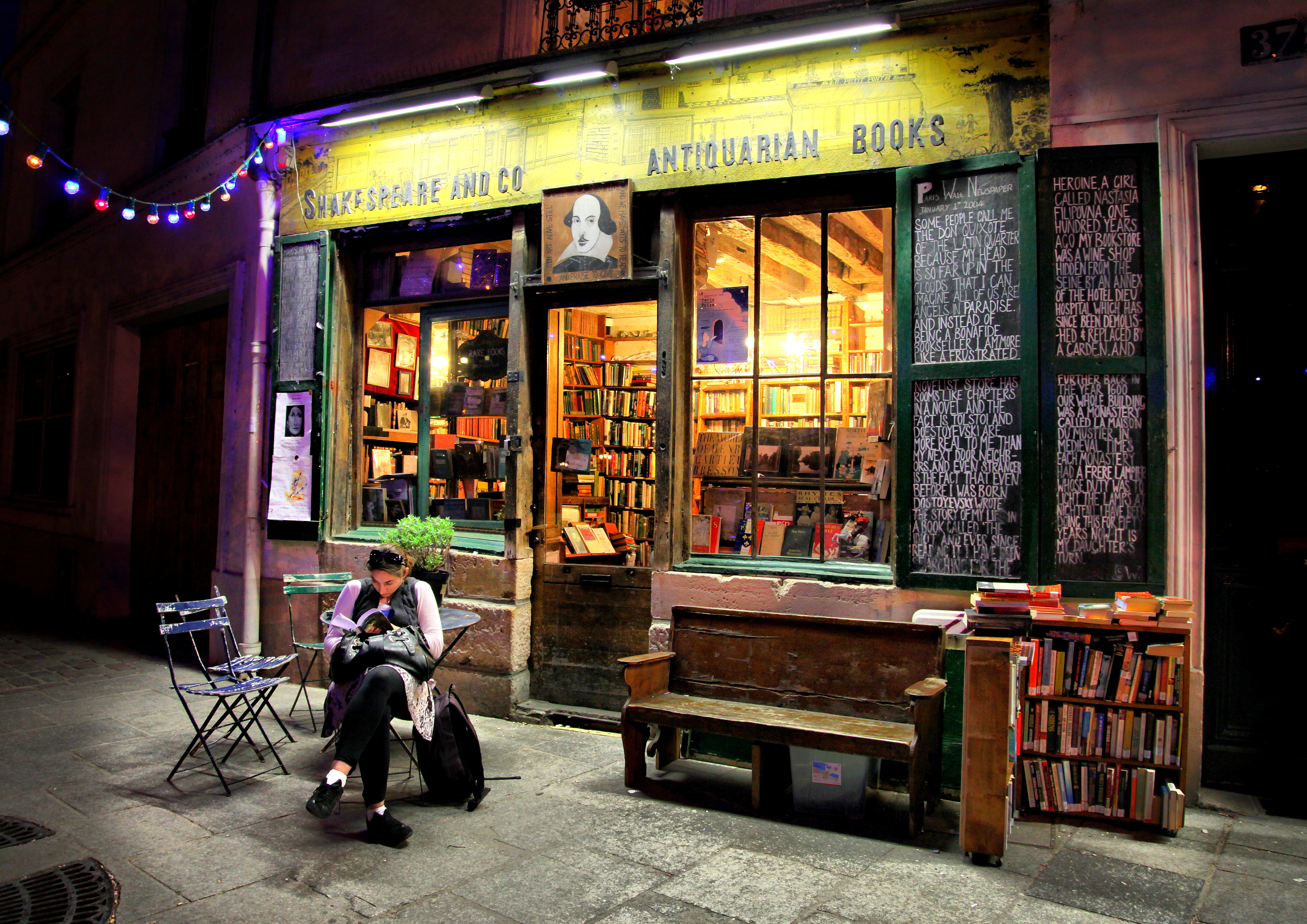
Shakespeare and Company, Paris, 2011

In 2003, Whitman founded a biennial literary festival, FestivalandCo, which has hosted such writers as Paul Auster, Siri Hustvedt, Jeanette Winterson, Jung Chang, and Marjane Satrapi.

In 2010, Shakespeare and Company launched the Paris Literary Prize for unpublished novellas, with a 10,000 euro prize donated by the de Groot Foundation. The winner of the first competition was Rosa Rankin-Gee, whose entry was subsequently published by Virago Press.

Partnering with Bob's Bake Shop, Whitman and Delannet opened a café in 2015, located next door to the shop in what had been an abandoned garage since 1981. The Shakespeare and Company Café serves primarily vegetarian food, with vegan and gluten-free options.

In 2016, the bookstore published its own history in a book titled Shakespeare and Company, Paris: A History of the Rag & Bone Shop of the Heart (edited by Krista Halverson), which features an epilogue by Whitman, as well as a foreword by Jeanette Winterson.

In 2023, Whitman was elected an Honorary Fellow of the Royal Society of Literature.

== Media appearances ==
Whitman appears, alongside her father, in the 2003 documentary Portrait of a Bookstore as an Old Man.

She appears in the three Paris episodes of The Late Late Show with Craig Ferguson, which aired the first week of August 2011.

She is the subject of a 2012 episode of Sundance Beginnings, documentary shorts directed by Chiara Clemente.

She appears in an episode of the BBC television series Imagine, first broadcast in 2012: "Jeanette Winterson: My Monster and Me".

She is featured in the three-part 2014 BBC television documentary series Bright Lights, Brilliant Minds: A Tale of Three Cities by art historian James Fox in episode 2: "Paris 1928".
