= Peak Literary Festival =

Peak Literary Festival logo

The Peak Literary Festival was a literary festival held in the Peak District National Park in England. The Spring Festival was held in May and the Autumn Festival in October. Events included a literary dinner and lunch at historic venues such as Chatsworth House and Hassop Hall, 'The Great Outdoors' and panel discussions with audience participation.

== Speakers ==
Previous festival authors included Clare Short, Tariq Ali, Matthew Parris, Gervase Phinn, Brian Turner, the Dowager Duchess of Devonshire, Clive Aslet (Country Life editor), James Geary (editor of Time Magazine), Roger Protz (editor of the Campaign for Real Ale (CAMRA), Jane Fearnley Whittingstall, Colin Tudge, David Rothenberg, David and Ben Crystal, Martin Gurdon, Mark Gwynne Jones, E. A. Markham, Meg Hutchinson, Wendy Holden, Dugald Steer, Martyn Ware (The Human League), Russel Senior and Nick Banks (Pulp), Mark Waddington (CEO of Warchild), Nick Temple (editor of Global Ideas Bank), Susanne Garnett (Director of Village Aid), Ann Widdecombe, Anne Fine, Gary Younge, Stuart Mcleane, Jeanette Orrey, Sue Cowley, Margaret Dickinson, Moazzam Begg, Edwina Currie, Don Shaw, Immaculee Ilibagiza. Speakers at previous Countrybookshop events include Ellen MacArthur, Joe Simpson, Simon Yates, Roy Hattersley, Richard Whiteley and Judith Miller.

Autumn 2006 speakers included 'The Great Outdoors' events with Rob Gambi, Jo Gambi, Benedict Allen, Fred Pearce, James Cracknell, Ben Fogle, George Band and Guy Grieve; 'Sustainable Living and Country Matters' events with Tom Petherick, Mark Cocker, Johnny Kingdom, Willie Newlands, Jackie Moffat and Michael Norton. Other speakers include G.P. Taylor, William Dalrymple, David Blunkett, George Galloway, Gervase Phinn and Alan Titchmarsh. The festival also includes a Literary Dinner at Chatsworth House with Francesco da Mosto, a Literary Lunch at Hassop Hall with Joan Bakewell and Steve D. Smith, and a Spanish evening with Chris Stewart and Peter Kerr.
