= Geoffrey Pugen =

Geoffrey Pugen (born 1975) is a Toronto-based video artist.

== Career ==
Working with video, film, performance, and photography, Pugen explores alternate realities through simulating and re-contextualizing media histories.

Pugen has made several works that have been shown internationally including Utopics, Sahara Sahara, and Bridge Kids.

Pugen has exhibited his art, films and videos at the Museum of Contemporary Canadian Art, World Wide Short Film Festival, Berlin Transmediale International Media Arts Festival, European Media Art Festival, and the Poland 12th International Media Art Biennale WRO 07. Publications include Adbusters, Descant Magazine and Future Species. He is a recipient of the K.M. Hunter Award for Interdisciplinary art.

== Gallery Representation ==
Pugen is currently represented by MKG127 in Toronto.
