= Robert Dessaix =

Australian writer (born 1944)

- Born: 1944 (age 81–82); Sydney, Australia
- Education: North Sydney Boys High School; Australian National University; Moscow State University
- Occupations: Novelist, essayist, journalist
- Website: robertdessaix.au

Robert Dessaix (born 1944), also known as Robert Jones, is an Australian novelist, essayist and journalist.

== Early life and education ==
Robert Dessaix was born in Sydney, Australia, and was adopted at an early age by Tom and Jean Jones, after which he was known as Robert Jones. Tom Jones, a merchant seaman, was already 55 when Robert was adopted.

Dessaix was educated at North Sydney Boys High School and the Australian National University (ANU). He studied at Moscow State University during the early 1970s.

== Career ==
Dessaix taught Russian studies at ANU and the University of New South Wales from 1972 to 1984. During this time he translated a number of Russian books into English in collaboration with Michael T. Ullman, including The Sheepskin Coat and An Absolutely Happy Village by Boris Vakhtin.

Robert Jones resumed his birth name Robert Dessaix after he was awarded his doctorate.

From 1985 to 1995, he presented the ABC program Books and Writing.

His first book was his autobiography, A Mother's Disgrace, which was published in 1994 by HarperCollins. The manuscript was written in French, and the book concerns his journey to an alternative sexuality after twelve years of marriage and his meeting with his birth mother Yvonne. It was made into a screenplay by Ross Wilson in 1999. Dessaix never met his birth father, who was killed in an air crash shortly after the end of World War II.

His first fictional work, the epistolary novel Night Letters, was published in 1996. It was translated into German, French, Italian, Dutch, Finnish, Polish, and Portuguese.

Manuscripts concerning A Mother's Disgrace are in the Mitchell Library of the State Library of New South Wales, along with Night Letters.

His second novel was Corfu, published in 2001.

Dessaix's long work, Twilight of Love: Travels with Turgenev, published in 2004, defies genre characterisation, interweaving a personal travelogue with a biography of Ivan Turgenev. It takes inspiration from his doctoral thesis on Turgenev and the Soviet Union, as well as Alain de Botton's works on travel, art and philosophy.

In March 2010, it was revealed that Dessaix had been refused a visa to attend the Shanghai International Literary Festival. He had declared his HIV-positive status on his application, and although the guidelines stated that HIV status would have no prejudicial effect, it was felt that it must have been the reason for the refusal because Dessaix had had no political involvement in matters concerning China.

He published a further memoir, Chameleon: A Memoir of Art, Travel, Ideas and Love, in 2025.

== Awards and nominations ==
- NBC Banjo Awards, NBC Banjo Award for Non-Fiction, 1994: A Mother's Disgrace – shortlisted
- Booksellers Choice Award, 1996: Night Letters : A Journey Through Switzerland and Italy Edited and Annotated by Igor Miazmov – joint winner
- Australian Literature Society Gold Medal, 1997: Night Letters: A Journey Through Switzerland and Italy Edited and Annotated by Igor Miazmov – winner
- Colin Roderick Award, 1998: (And So Forth) – winner
- Nib Literary Award (Waverley Library), 2005: Twilight of Love: Travels with Turgenev – shortlisted
- Victorian Premier's Literary Award, The Nettie Palmer Prize for Non-Fiction, 2005: Twilight of Love: Travels with Turgenev – winner
- New South Wales Premier's Literary Awards, Douglas Stewart Prize for Non-Fiction, 2005: Twilight of Love : Travels with Turgenev – shortlisted
- Margaret Scott Prize, 2007: Twilight of Love : Travels with Turgenev – winner
- Australia Council Award for Lifetime Achievement in Literature, 2022

== Works ==
=== Novels ===
- Night Letters: A Journey Through Switzerland and Italy Edited and Annotated by Igor Miazmov (1996), ISBN 0-312-19939-2
- Secrets (with Drusilla Modjeska and Amanda Lohrey, 1997), ISBN 9780732908638
- Corfu (2001), ISBN 0-330-36278-X

=== Autobiography ===
- A Mother's Disgrace (1994), ISBN 0-207-17934-4
- Arabesques : A Tale of Double Lives (2008), ISBN 9781925589016
- What Days Are For (2014), ISBN 9780857985774
- Chameleon: A Memoir of Art, Travel, Ideas and Love (2025), ISBN 978-1-923058-27-9

=== Non-fiction ===
- (and so forth) (1998), ISBN 0330362070
- Twilight of Love: Travels with Turgenev (2004), ISBN 1-59376-063-9
- As I Was Saying: A Collection of Musings (2012), ISBN 978-1-74275-307-2
- Arabesques: A Tale of Double Lives ISBN 9780330425162
- The Pleasures of Leisure (2017), ISBN 9780143780045
- The Time of Our Lives: Growing Older Well (2020), ISBN 9781922267276

=== Edited ===
- Australian Gay and Lesbian Writing: An Anthology (1993), ISBN 978-0195534573
- Picador New Writing (1993), ISBN 9780330273978
- Speaking Their Minds: Intellectuals and the Public Culture in Australia (1998), ISBN 9780733306532
- The Best Australian Essays 2004 (2004), ISBN 978-1863952378
- The Best Australian Essays 2005 (2005), ISBN 978-1863951180

=== Translation ===
- The Mysterious Tales of Ivan Turgenev (1979), ISBN 978-0708112045
