= Kerala Legislature International Book Festival =

Kerala Legislature International Book Festival (KLIBF)
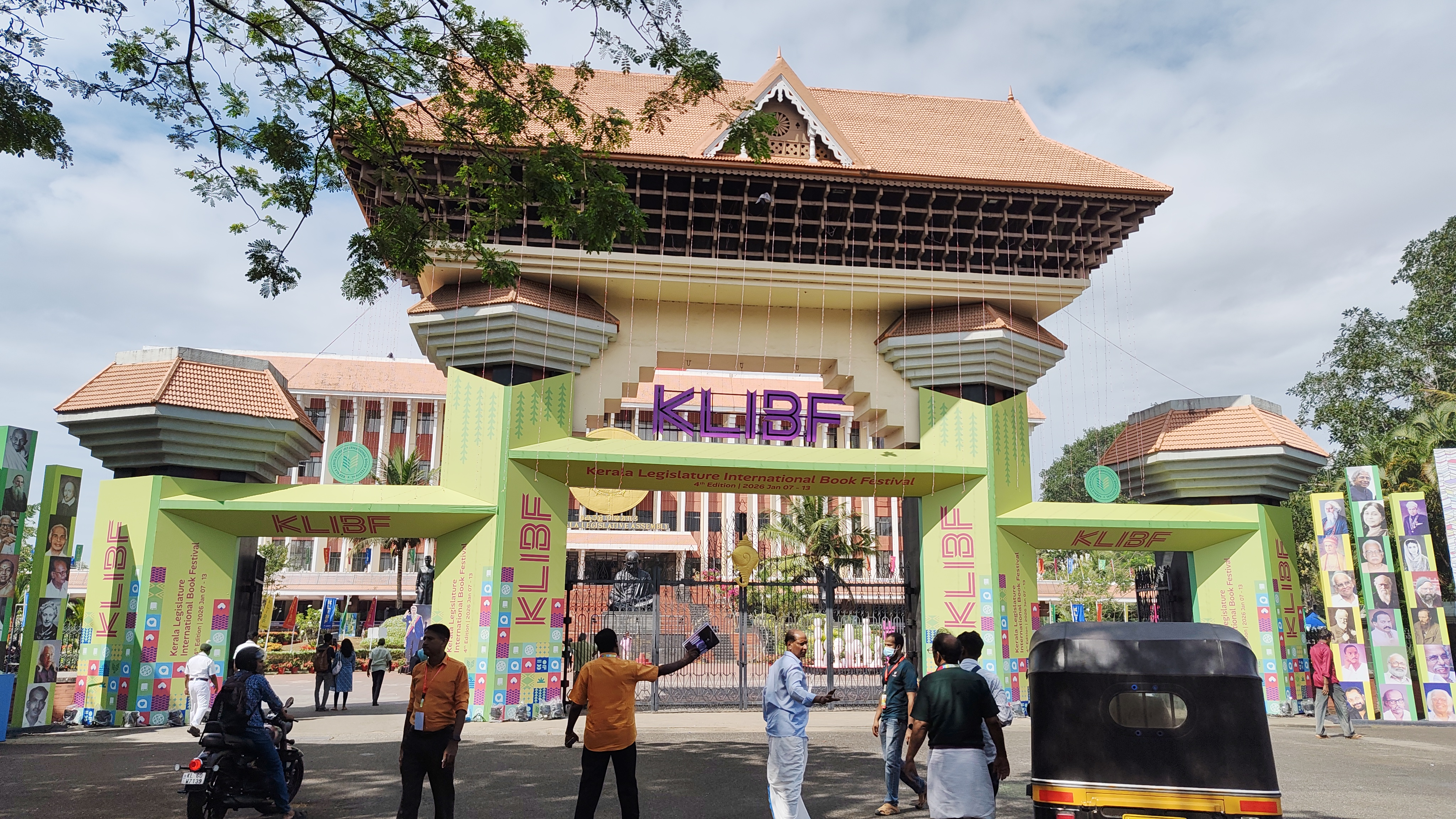
- Kerala Legislature International Book Festival 2026
- Status: active
- Genre: Literary festival
- Locations: Thiruvananthapuram, Kerala, India
- Years active: 2023 - present
- Website: klibf.niyamasabha.org

Kerala Legislature International Book Festival (KLIBF) is an annual literary and cultural festival organised by the Kerala Legislative Assembly at its complex in Thiruvananthapuram, Kerala, India. The fouth edition of the book festival will be held from 7 to 13 January 2026. The festival brings together publishers, authors, scholars, and readers for a week-long celebration of books, ideas, and public discourse, with free entry for the general public. It has emerged as a signature event of the Assembly, highlighting the role of reading in strengthening democratic values and informed citizenship.

== History ==
The KLIBF was conceived as a cultural initiative of the Kerala Legislative Assembly to promote reading, critical thinking, and dialogue between citizens and institutions. Early editions of the festival established the legislative complex as a public cultural space by hosting book stalls, seminars, and interactive sessions alongside guided visits to the Assembly hall and museum. By the time of its third editions, the festival had gained national and international attention, drawing large numbers of visitors and participants from within India and abroad.

== Editions ==
=== Third edition (2025) ===
The third edition of the KLIBF was held from 8 to 13 January 2025 and was a success and a marked improvement on the previous two editions. Over the seven days of the festival, around three lakh visitors attended the event, which featured 166 publishers and nearly 266 stalls. The programme included talks, debates, meet-the-author sessions, and book launches held across multiple venues in the Kerala Legislative Assembly complex.

=== Fourth edition (2026) ===
The fourth edition of the Kerala Legislature International Book Festival from 7 to 13 January 2026 on the premises of the Kerala Legislative Assembly in Thiruvananthapuram was inaugurated by Chief Minister Pinarayi Vijayan. Entry to the seven-day festival is free, with visitors also given opportunities to tour the Assembly hall and the Legislative Museum. More than 200 publishers and over 250 stalls are expected to participate, and the programme will feature book launches, book discussions, panel dialogues, author interactions, interviews, and lectures across six venues, alongside a specially designed Students Corner with children's activities such as puppet and magic shows. Theyyam will be staged from January 8 to 12 as a main highlight.

== Gallery ==
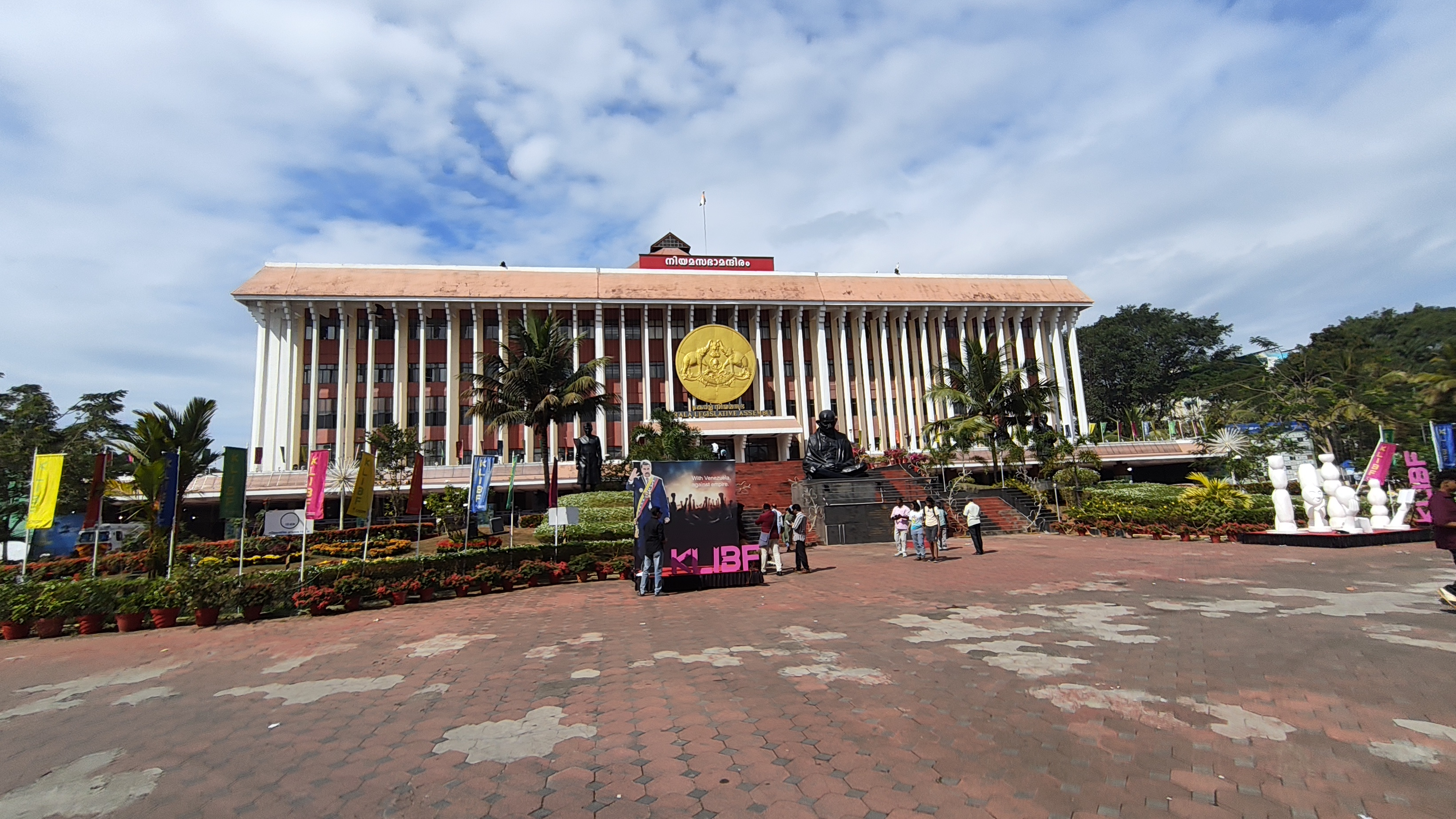
Entrance

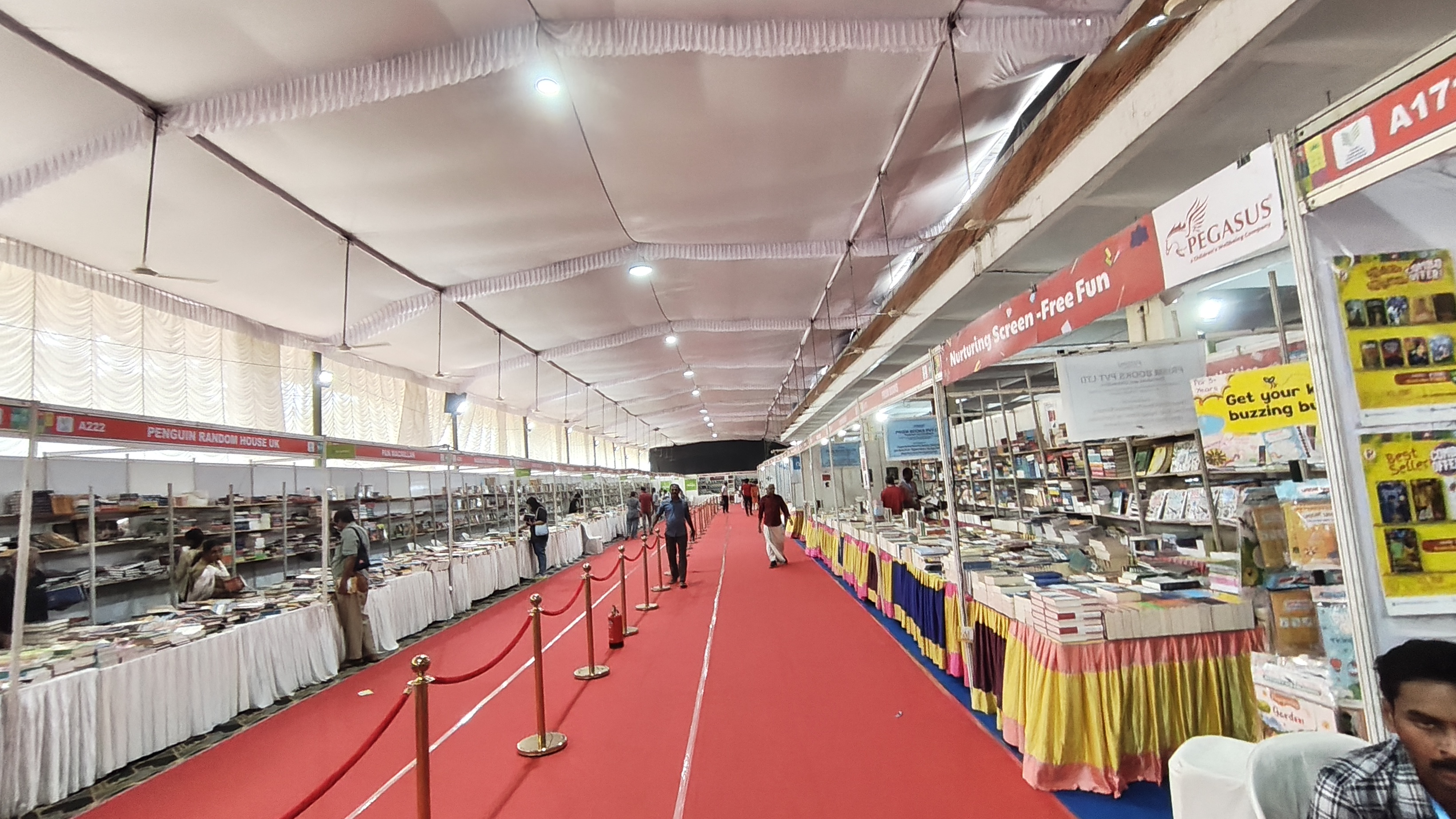
Book Stalls

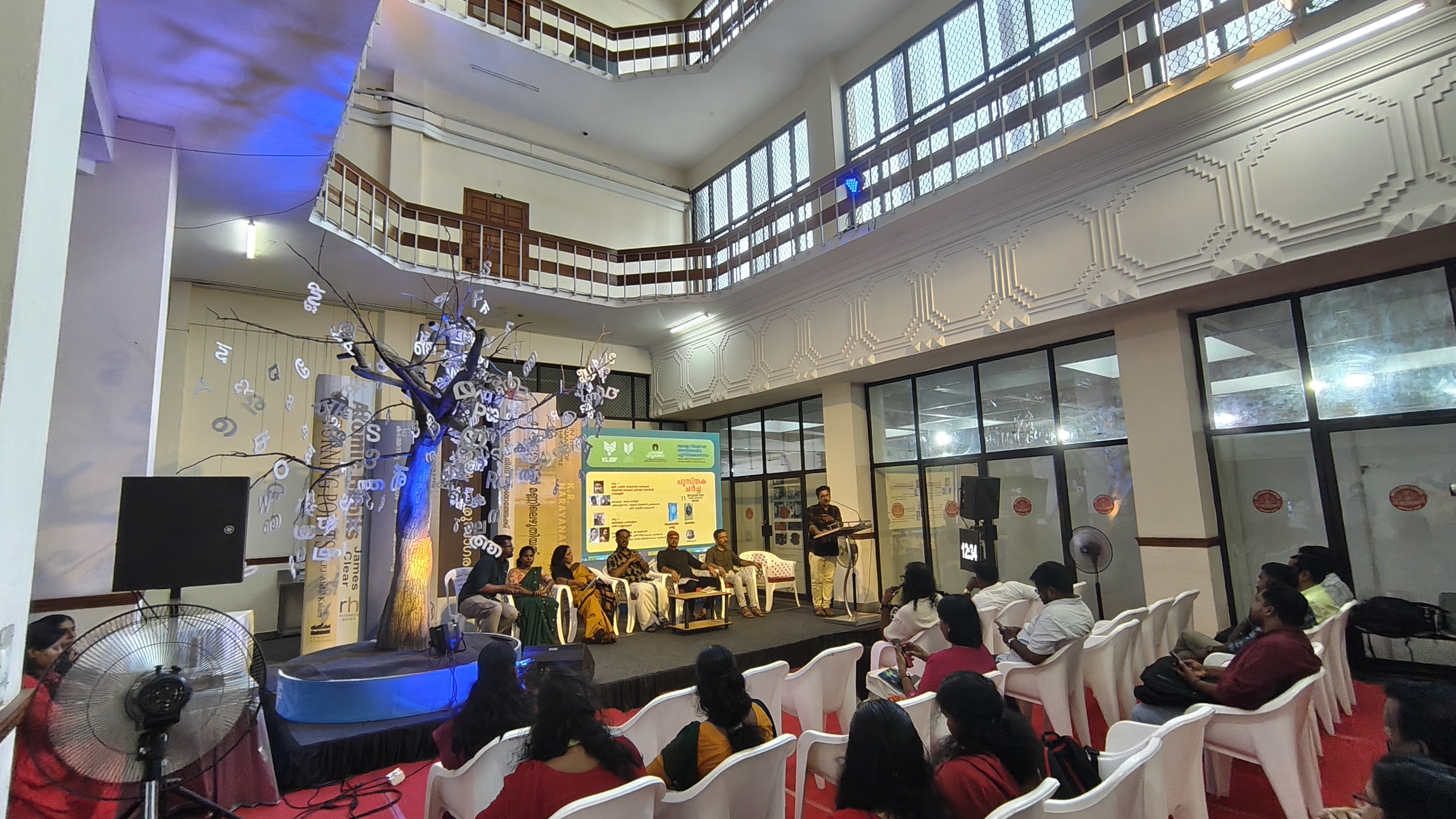
Events

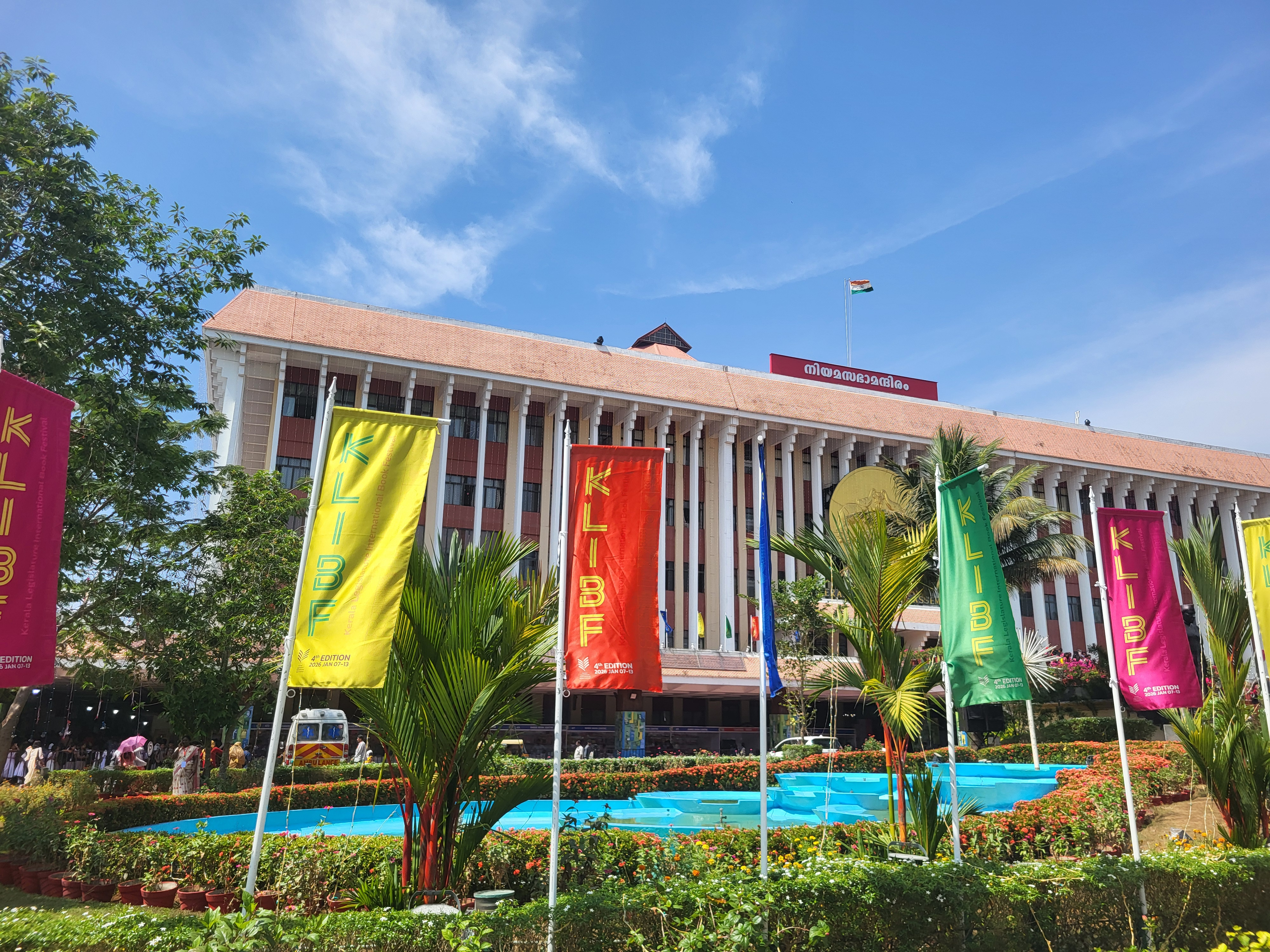
Decorations

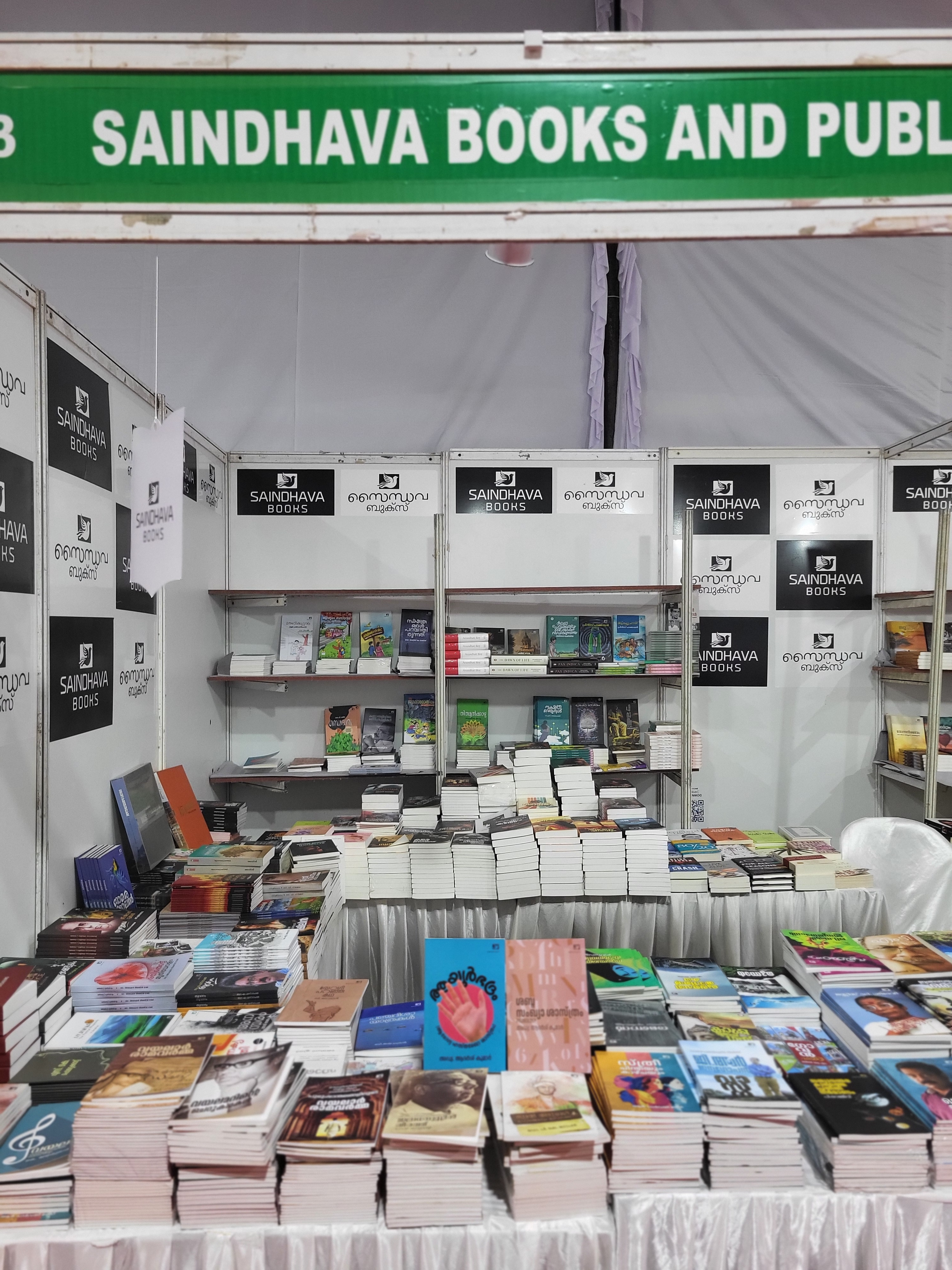
Book Stall

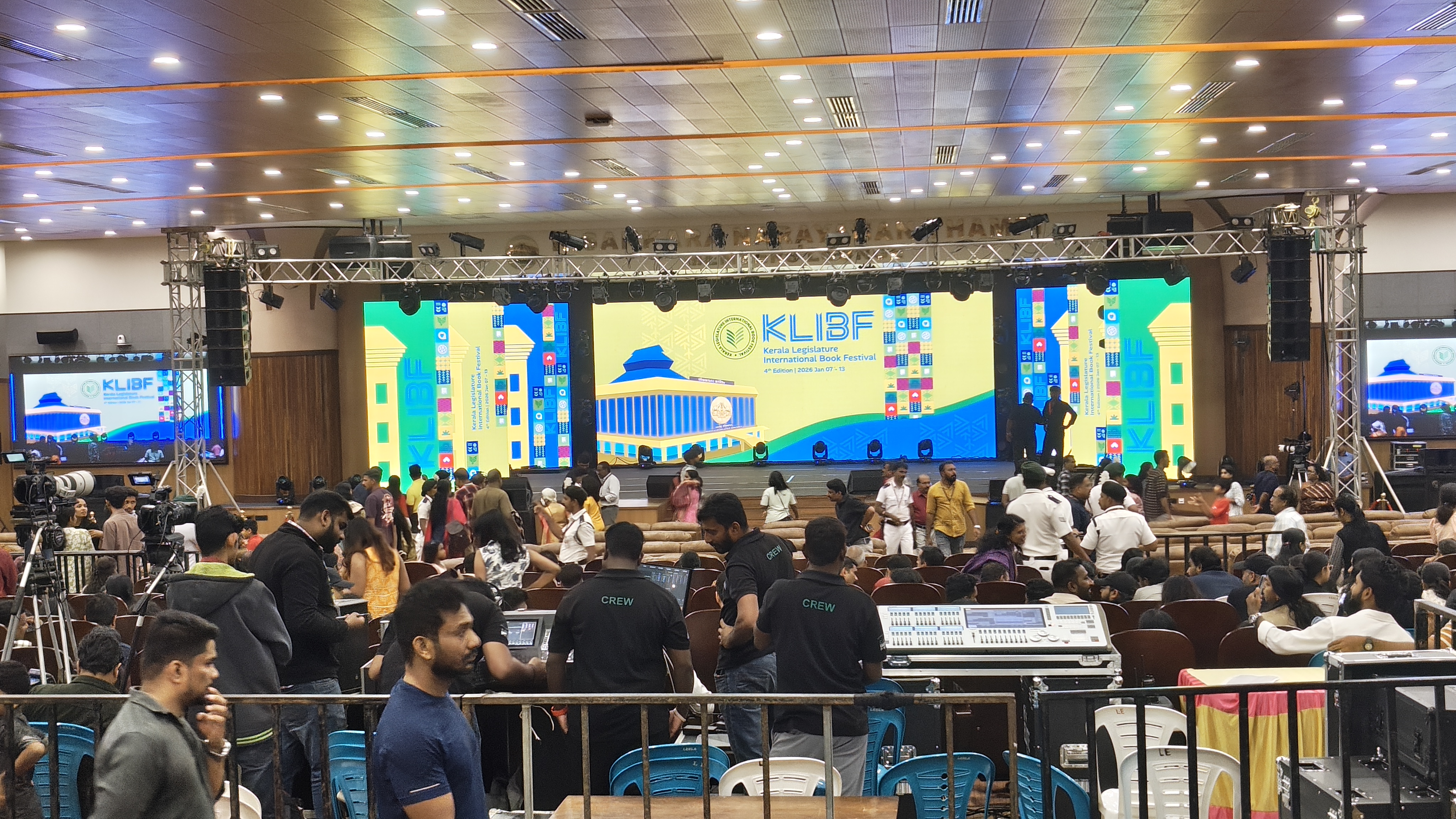
Main Stage
