= George Whitman =

Bookstore proprietor

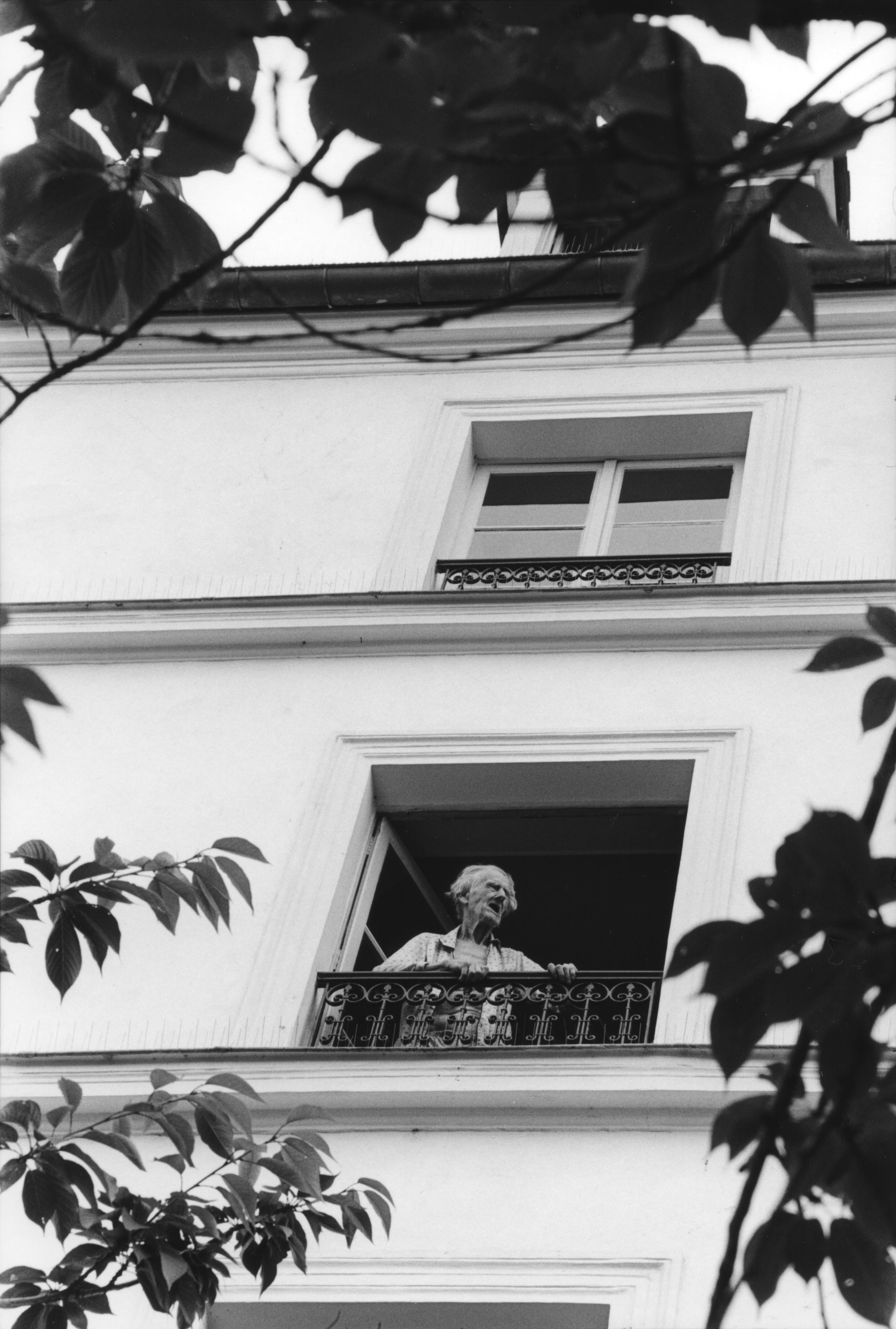
- 94-year-old George Whitman above his bookshop in 2008 by Olivier Meyer
- Born: December 12, 1913; East Orange, New Jersey, U.S.
- Died: December 14, 2011 (aged 98); Paris, France
- Occupation: Proprietor
- Children: Sylvia Whitman

George Whitman (December 12, 1913 – December 14, 2011) was an American bookseller who lived most of his life in France. He was the founder and proprietor of the second Shakespeare and Company, which was named after Sylvia Beach's bookstore of the same name on Paris's Left Bank. He was a contemporary of writers such as Allen Ginsberg, Anaïs Nin, and Lawrence Durrell, as well as a lifelong friend of the poet Lawrence Ferlinghetti.

In 2006 he was awarded the Officier de l'Ordre des Arts et des Lettres medal by the French government for his contribution to the arts over the previous fifty years.

== Early life and education ==
Whitman was born in East Orange, New Jersey, and grew up in Salem, Massachusetts. The first book he read was The Light That Failed by Rudyard Kipling. When he was a boy, his family spent two years living in Nanjing, China, where his physics professor father, Walter, had a guest professorship.

He graduated with a degree in journalism from Boston University in 1935.

== Travels, military service and first bookstore ==
After graduation, Whitman train-hopped, hitchhiked, and walked on foot through the U.S., Mexico, and Central America. He said that he was met with kindness and generosity, and this formed the founding ethos of his bookstore: "Give what you can; take what you need".

From 1940 to 1944, Whitman served in the U.S. Army. For the first two years, he was stationed at a remote weather post in Greenland, where he was a medical warrant officer. From 1943 to 1944, he served in a hospital in Taunton, Massachusetts.

While in Massachusetts during his military service, Whitman also opened his first bookstore, the Taunton Book Lounge, "modeled on the great Paris salons", as he wrote to a friend.

== Shakespeare and Company ==
In August 1946, Whitman boarded a ship for Paris, to work in a camp for war orphans. When it disbanded, he enrolled at the Sorbonne to study French civilisation. He traded his G.I. rations for other veterans' book allowances, quickly amassing a large number of books. He left the door to his tiny room in the Hotel de Suez unlocked, so anyone could come and read the books whether he was home or not.

With his own collection of one thousand books, and having come into a small inheritance, Whitman bought an Arab grocery in Paris and transformed it into a bookstore in 1951 at 37 rue de la Bûcherie on the Left Bank. It was first called Le Mistral, but was later renamed (in 1964) Shakespeare and Company, after Sylvia Beach's earlier Paris bookstore of the same name (1919 to 1941). Beach, who visited Whitman's bookstore, is said to have called his shop the "spiritual successor" to her own.

Whitman's shop opened just two years before his friend Lawrence Ferlinghetti co-founded City Lights in San Francisco. The two men had met in Paris in 1948.

Beginning in 1951, when the shop opened, Whitman invited travelers—usually aspiring writers, poets, and artists—to stay in the shop for free. In exchange, they were asked to help out around the bookstore, agree to read a book a day, and write a one-page autobiography for the shop's archives. Whitman called these guests "tumbleweeds" after the rootless plants that "blow in and out on the winds of chance". On Sunday mornings, he would traditionally cook his guests a pancake breakfast, brewing up a "syrup" out of burnt sugar and water. Since 1951, an estimated 30,000 people have slept at Shakespeare and Company in beds tucked among the shelves.

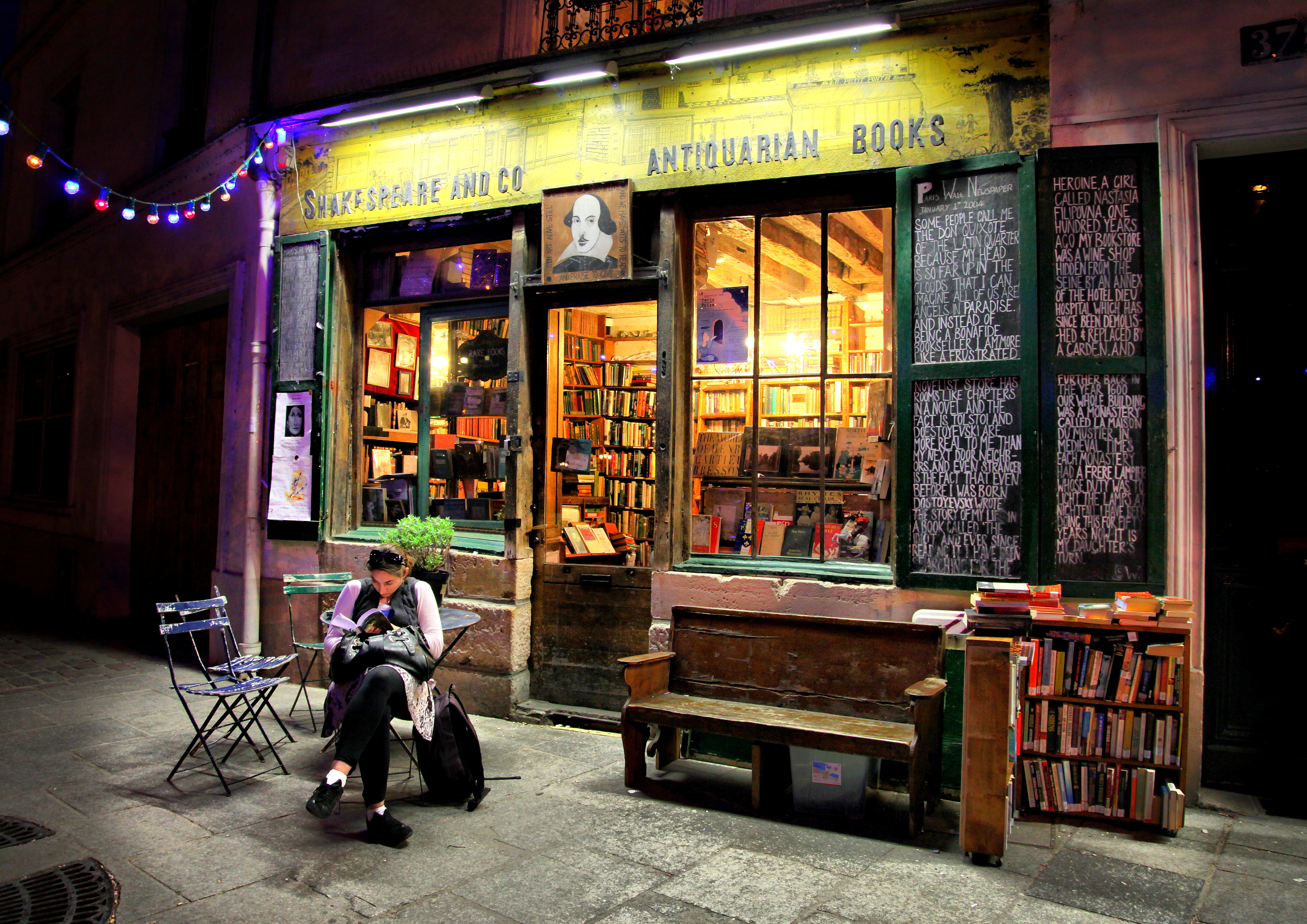
Shakespeare and Company, Paris, 2011

Whitman's only child, Sylvia Whitman, was born in 1981. She now runs Shakespeare and Company with her partner, David Delannet.

Whitman was awarded the Officier de l'Ordre des Arts et des Lettres in 2006, one of France's highest cultural honors.

Whitman was the subject of a documentary titled Portrait of a Bookstore as an Old Man by Gonzague Pichelin and Benjamin Sutherland broadcast on the Sundance Channel in fall 2005.

On September 26, 2007, journalist Gerry Hadden's story on Whitman, his daughter Sylvia Whitman, and Shakespeare and Company aired on NPR's The World (a co-production of the BBC, Public Radio International (PRI), and the Boston radio station WGBH).

== Death ==
Whitman died on December 14, 2011, at age 98, at home in the apartment above his bookshop. He is buried in the Père Lachaise Cemetery in the east of Paris.
