= Lunch lady =

Female worker who serves food in a school cafeteria

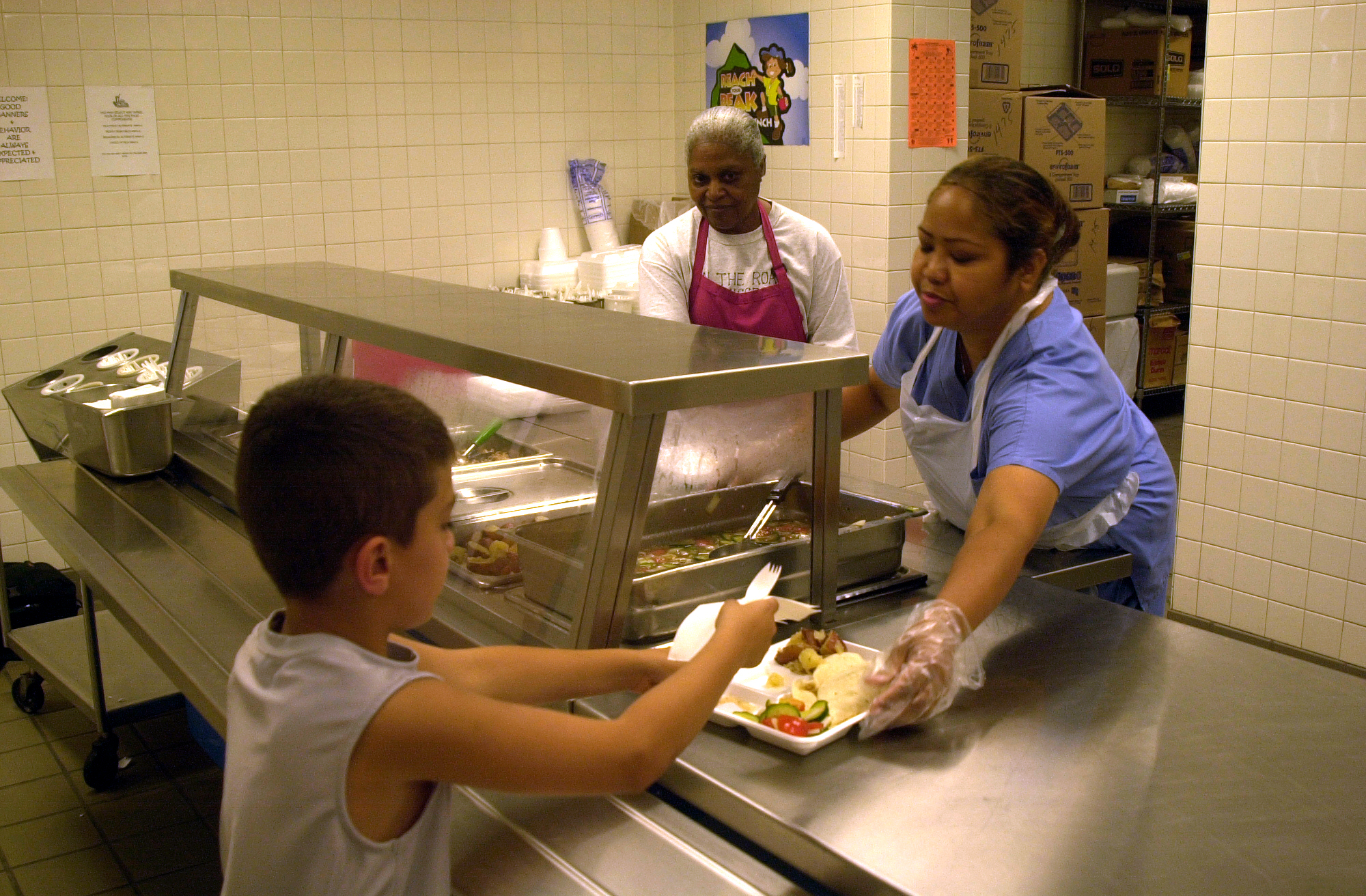
- A lunch lady serves a child at a school.

Occupation
- Synonyms: cafeteria lady, dinner lady
- Occupation type: vocation

Description
- Competencies: food preparation
- Related jobs: cook

Lunch lady, in Canada and the United States, is a term for a staff member or contractor, often a woman, who cooks or serves food in a school cafeteria or canteen. The equivalent term in the United Kingdom is dinner lady. The role is also known as cafeteria lady, school caterer, lunchtime assistant, school meal supervisor, midday supervisor or kitchen assistant. Lunch ladies may also patrol the school playground during lunch breaks to help maintain order.

== Dinner ladies in the United Kingdom ==
In the United Kingdom, dinner ladies are often also parents, and "can provide a useful bridge of interaction with the community". They are "part of the authority-structure of the school". With training, they can help to address bullying in schools. They have been described as having "a significant role in the educational system". In some schools, school lunch staff live locally and are "part of [children's] lives both inside and outside of school". They sometimes staff breakfast clubs.

The dinner lady Nora Sands, who worked at Kidbrooke School in London, was an important part of the television series Jamie's School Dinners presented by Jamie Oliver. Sands later published Nora's Dinners (2006). Another dinner lady, Jeanette Orrey, worked with Oliver on his campaign for better school meals, and received an MBE for services to food in schools. She has spoken about the way in which dinner ladies became deskilled in the 1990s. Oliver opened a training school for dinner ladies in 2005.

School meal staff in North Yorkshire took legal action in 1987 under equal pay legislation, because dinner ladies were paid less than men in comparable jobs. In Camden, dinner ladies campaigned to receive the London living wage.

== In popular culture ==
- Dinnerladies is a British TV sitcom broadcast on BBC1, although it was set in a fictional factory rather than a school.
- Miss Beazley from the Archie Comics franchise is a lunch lady.
- In The Muppet Show, Gladys serves as the cafeteria lady for the Muppet Theater's canteen. In Season Four, Gladys is replaced by Winny.
- Lunchlady Doris is the Springfield Elementary School lunch lady on The Simpsons.
- Adam Sandler on Saturday Night Live performed a song called "Lunch Lady Land" and accompanying skit with Chris Farley dressed up as a lunch lady. The song appeared on Sandler's album They're All Gonna Laugh at You!.
- The school lunch lady plays a key role in the plot of "Earshot", an episode of Buffy the Vampire Slayer.
- Rosa Petitjean is a fictional lunch lady of Kadic Junior High School in the French animated series Code Lyoko.
- Edna is the highly unhygienic lunch lady for Bullworth Academy in the video game Bully. She often coughs, sneezes and blows cigarette smoke on any food she prepares, believing it "adds flavor". She also is unconcerned about the opinions of health inspectors.
- The band The Darkness has a song named "Dinner Lady Arms" on their album One Way Ticket to Hell... and Back.
- In the Nickelodeon TV series Ned's Declassified School Survival Guide, Lunch Lady Rose (portrayed by Loni Love) is a psychic lunch lady who can see the future in the beans, peas, and corn.
- Mrs. Sara MacGrady (later renamed Leah MacGrady in and after the episode "The Great MacGrady"), the lunch lady for Lakewood Elementary School in the TV show Arthur.
- In the Nickelodeon animated series Danny Phantom, the first villain that appears is the Lunch Lady Ghost (voiced by Patricia Heaton in the first appearance, Kath Soucie in later appearances). She does not like any changes to the cafeteria's good meat-based lunch menu and she can also control food (namely meat), to the point of forming it 100% all around herself as a giant evil meat monster.
- In the Nickelodeon series All That, Miss Piddlin (portrayed by Kenan Thompson) is a lunch lady who gets angry at students who do not like peas. Sketches featuring her frequently ending with her singing a pea-themed song parody. One sketch had her competing with another lunch lady (portrayed by Christy Knowings) who mostly serves carrots.
- In the series Johnny Test, one of Johnny's enemies is a lunch lady. This lunch lady has greenish skin and speaks in a German accent. She can be very cruel when students do not eat her disgusting (albeit sometimes healthy) food.
- Jarrett J. Krosoczka wrote and illustrated a Lunch Lady series of children's graphic novels beginning with Lunch Lady and the Cyborg Substitute in 2009; a Universal Pictures movie based on the series was announced and would feature Amy Poehler in the lead role.
- In the Peacock television series, Girls5eva, Chad L. Coleman plays a recurring character, Sheawn, who is the male version of a lunch lady, called "the lunch lord."
