= Karen Mulhallen =

Canadian educator, poet and editor (born 1942)

- Born: 1942 (age 83–84); Woodstock, Ontario, Canada
- Education: Waterloo Lutheran University (BA); University of Toronto (MA, PhD)
- Occupations: Educator, poet, editor of Descant literary magazine
- Writing career
- Language: English
- Website: karenmulhallen.com

Karen Mulhallen (born 1942 in Woodstock, Ontario, Canada) is a Canadian educator, poet, essayist, critic and editor. She taught English at Ryerson University from 1967 to 2014. She served as the poetry review editor of The Canadian Forum from 1974 to 1979, and their features editor from 1975 to 1988. In 1973, Mulhallen became editor-in-chief of Descant until its closure in 2015.

== Biography ==
Karen Mulhallen received her BA degree in 1963 from Waterloo Lutheran University (now Wilfrid Laurier University), her MA (English) in 1967, and PhD (English) in 1975, both from the University of Toronto.

For 42 years, she was editor-in-chief of Descant, a Toronto-based quarterly journal of poetry, prose and visual arts. During that time, the magazine won six Canadian National Magazine Awards and the Litho Award for Outstanding Achievement in the Printing Industry.

Until her retirement in 2014, Mulhallen, a William Blake scholar, was a professor of English at Ryerson University in Toronto and an adjunct professor at the University of Toronto, Department of English.

Early in her career, Mulhallen was shy about submitting her work for publication until she became involved with [Descant magazine in the early 1970s. A prolific writer, she has published 18 books of poetry, a number of edited volumes and dozens of essays and academic articles on the arts both in Canada and in the UK. In 2010 she organized and chaired a symposium, "Blake In Our Time: A Symposium Celebrating the Future of Blake Studies & the Legacy of G.E. Bentley Jr."

Mulhallen has been called a metaphysical poet. Her most recent book of poetry, Code Orange: An Emblazoned Suite is a bilingual edition (French/English) translated by Nancy Huston (Black Moss Press, 2015).

Her papers are archived at the University of Calgary and at the Thomas Fisher Rare Book Library, University of Toronto.

== Selected book publications ==
Poetry

- Captive Love, A Memoir of Rescue, Polyphonic, Quattro Books, December 2017
- Seasons in an Unknown Key, Tightrope Books, 2017
- Code Orange: An Emblazoned Suite, bilingual edition with Nancy Huston, Black Moss Press, 2015
- Fishing Poems, Black Moss Press, 2014
- The Pillow Books, Black Moss Press, 2011
- Acquainted With Absence, Selected Poems. ed. and Introduction by Douglas Glover, Blaurock Press, 2009
- Sea Horses, Black Moss Press, 2007
- Renga Talk, Pasdeloup Press, 2007. Limited Edition of 12 copies. (dialogue poems with Virgil Burnett)
- Sea Light, Black Moss Press, 2003
- Leifr’s Story, Pasdeloup Press, 2002. Illustrated by Helen Edmonds.
- The Grace of Private Passage, Black Moss Press, 2000
- Herm on Tour, Pasdeloup Press, 1998
- The Caverns of Ely, Pasdeloup Press, 1997
- War Surgery, A Jazz Catafalque, Black Moss Press, 1996
- A Sentimental Dialogue, Pasdeloup Press, 1996 [with Virgil Burnett]
- In the Era of Acid Rain, Black Moss Press, 1993
- Modern Love, Poems 1970-1989, Black Moss Press, 1990
- Sheba and Solomon, Eleftheria Press, 1984

Edited volumes

- Remember Me! Blake In Our Time A Keepsake Book In Celebration of An Exhibition and Symposium on the Life and Art of William Blake (1757-1827), Victoria University, Toronto, Victoria University Library, 2010
- Blake In Our Time, Essays in Honour of G.E. Bentley Jr. ed. and intro., Toronto: University of Toronto Press, 2010
- Beyond The 49th Parallel: Writing The New Canadian Fiction, ed. and intro., Istanbul and Ankara, Turkey: Yapi Kredi Sanat, 2004
- Paper Guitar; Twenty-Seven Writers Celebrate Twenty-Five Years of Descant magazine, ed., Toronto: HarperCollins, 1995
- Views from the North, An Anthology of Travel Writing, ed., The Porcupine's Quill, 1984
- Tasks of Passion: Dennis Lee at Mid-Career, Toronto: Descant Editions, 1982. Edited with Donna Bennett, and Russell Brown.
