= Portrait of a Bookstore as an Old Man =

- Directed by: Benjamin Sutherland; Gonzague Pichelin
- Written by: Benjamin Sutherland; Gonzague Pichelin
- Starring: George Whitman; Sylvia Whitman
- Cinematography: Gonzague Pichelin
- Edited by: Thomas Bertay; Gonzague Pichelin
- Music by: Michael Galasso
- Release dates: March 2003 (Paris Printemps de Poètes Film Festival)
- Running time: 52 minutes
- Country: United States
- Language: English

Portrait of a Bookstore as an Old Man is a 2003 documentary film directed by Benjamin Sutherland and Gonzague Pichelin.

== Overview ==
Documentary about the Paris bookstore Shakespeare and Company opened in 1951 and it's owner George Whitman.

== Critical reception ==
The New York Times, "The bookstore is Shakespeare & Company, on Rue de la Bûcherie in Paris. The old man is its recently retired American expatriate owner, George Whitman."
