= Antanas Sileika =

Canadian-Lithuanian novelist and critic (born 1953)

Antanas Sileika (Antanas Šileika; born 1953) is a Canadian-Lithuanian novelist and critic.

== Biography ==
Sileika was born in 1953 in Weston, Ontario to Lithuanian-born parents.

After completing an English degree at the University of Toronto, he moved to Paris for two years and there married his wife, Snaige Sileika (née Valiunas), an art student at the Ecole des Beaux-Arts. While in Paris, he studied French, taught English in Versailles, and worked as part of the editorial collective of the expatriate literary journal, Paris Voices, run from the upstairs room of the bookstore, Shakespeare and Company. Upon his return to Canada in 1979, Sileika began teaching at Humber College and working as a co-editor of the Canadian literary journal, Descant, where he remained until 1988.

He wrote extensively as a journalist about Lithuania's re-establishment of independence during the collapse of the Soviet Union from 1988–1991, and for this activity he received Order for Merits to Lithuania from the Lithuanian government in 2004.

He retired in 2017 after fifteen years as director of the Humber School for Writers in Toronto, Canada. Sileika appears occasionally on Canadian television and radio as a free-lance broadcaster.

== Works ==
After writing for newspapers and magazines, Sileika published his first novel, Dinner at the End of the World (Mosaic Press 1994), a speculative story set in the aftermath of global warming.

His second book, a collection of linked short stories, Buying On Time (Porcupine's Quill 1997) was nominated for both the City of Toronto Book Award and the Stephen Leacock Award for Humour, and was serialized on CBC Radio's Between the Covers. The book traces the lives of a family of immigrants to a Canadian suburb between 1950s and 1970s. Some of these stories were anthologized in Dreaming Home, Canadian Short Stories, and the Penguin Anthology of Canadian Humour. The Lithuanian translation Pirkiniai išsimokėtinai was shortlisted for book of the year in Lithuania in 2014. The book was also translated into Chinese and Italian.

His third book, Woman in Bronze (Random House Canada 2004), compared the seasonal life of a young man in Czarist Lithuania with his subsequent attempts to succeed as a prominent sculptor in Paris in the twenties. The Lithuanian title is Bonzinė moteris. Translated into Chinese.

His novel Underground was released by Thomas Allen & Son in 2011. The novel was a love story set in the underground resistance to the Soviet Union in the late 1940s. The Lithuanian title is Pogrindis. Translated into Italian.

The Barefoot Bingo Caller is his memoir, published by ECW Press in May 2017. It received a starred review in Quill and Quire, Canada's publishing industry journal. The Lithuanian translation Basakojis bingo pranešėjas was named Lithuania's book of the year in 2018 in the category of adult fiction.

Provisionally Yours (Biblioasisi 2019)is an espionage novel set between 1921 and 1923 in Lithuania and was inspired by the memoir of Jonas Budrys, chief of counterintelligence at the time. It was shortlisted for the 2020 ReLit Award for fiction. It was made into a feature film in Lithuania in 2023 under the title Laikinai jūsų in 2024.

"Some Unfinished Business" was published by Cormorant Books in 2023. It is a story of love and betrayal set in postwar Soviet Lithuania from 1947-1959. the Lithuanian translation, "Nebaigti reikalai" was published by Baltos Lankos in 2024.

"The Death of Tony", a memoir about belonging in two cultures, was published by Stonehewer Books in 2024.

"Buying on Time Again" is an updated story collection with the addition of a new story and an essay, published by Stonehewer Books in 2025.

"The Seaside Café Metropolis" is a comic cold war novel set in a fashionable Vilnius restaurant during the Khrushchev era. Each chapter contains a Soviet-era recipe. Published Cormorant Books in 2025.

== Bibliography ==
- Dinner at the End of the World. Oakville, Ontario: Mosaic, 1994.
- Buying on Time, Erin, Ontario: Porcupine's Quill, 1997.
- Woman in Bronze, Toronto, Random House Canada, 2004.
- Underground, Toronto. Thomas Allen and Son, 2011
- The Barefoot Bingo Caller, Toronto, Ontario: ECW Press, 2017
- Provisionally Yours, Windsor, Ontario, Biblioasis, 2019
- Some Unfinished Business, Toronto, Ontario, Cormorant Books 2023
- The Death of Tony, Victoria, BC, Stonehewer Books, 2024
