= FestivalandCo =

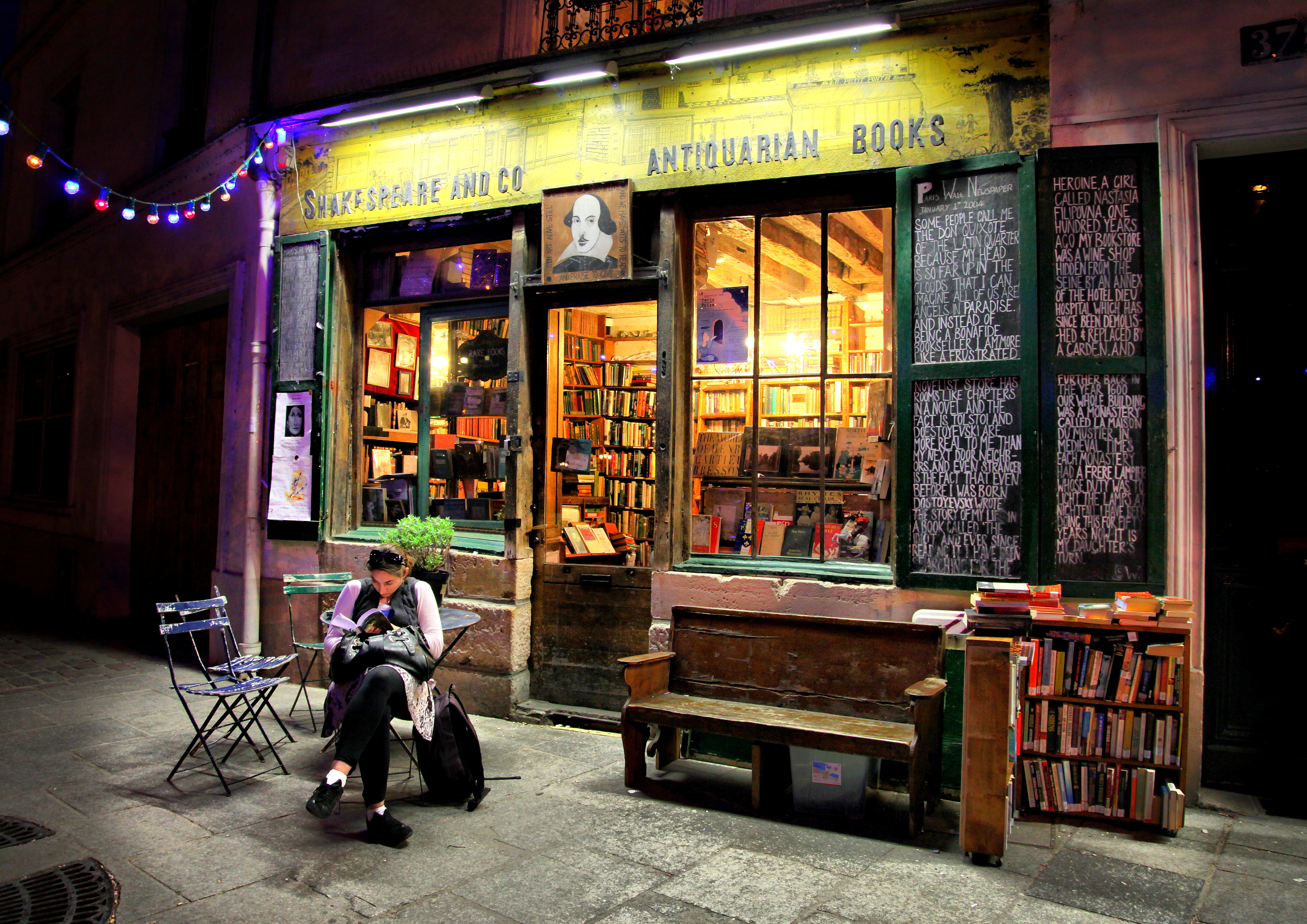
- Shakespeare and Company, Paris, 2011
- Genre: Literary festival
- Locations: Paris, France
- Website: festivalandco.com

FestivalandCo is a literary festival held in Paris, France at the Shakespeare and Company bookstore.

Sylvia Whitman founded the festival which has hosted such writers as Paul Auster, Siri Hustvedt, Jeanette Winterson, David Hare, Jung Chang, and Marjane Satrapi.
