= Les Rencontres d'Aubrac =

French literary festival

Les Rencontres d'Aubrac is a French literary festival. This event has taken place every last weekend of August in Aubrac, Aveyron, France since 1994.

== History ==
Les Rencontres d'Aubrac is an event aimed both at a specialized and a non-specialized public. The program (see the 2010 program here) is a mix between scientific lectures and films, theatre shows, and other forms of expressions such as workshops with the participation of the public.

Each year, a new theme is chosen among key themes of the French literature.

Themes chosen from the beginning of the Rencontres d'Aubrac:

1. Jean Giono, Julien Gracq in 1994
2. Charles-Ferdinand Ramuz in 1995
3. Henri Pourrat in 1996
4. Alexandre Vialatte in 1997
5. Littérature de sanatorium in 1998
6. Génie conteur du Nord (de l’Islande à l’Estonie) in 1999
7. Récits d’aventures sur les routes médiévales européennes in 2001
8. Aubracadabra : Qu’est-ce qu’un conte populaire ? in 2003
9. Aubracadabra : Figures du fantastique dans les contes et nouvelles in 2004
10. Dire les Mythes in 2005
11. Dire les Mythes (nouvelle édition) in 2006
12. Les mythes et les contes ont-ils encore un sens ? in 2007
13. Dire l'Interdit dans les contes, nouvelles, poèmes, chansons, films in 2008
14. Voyage en Absurdie in 2009
15. Vertige de l'Imposture in 2010

Complete list of programs

== Rencontres d'Aubrac in video ==
The Rencontres d'Aubrac are filmed by the MSH, within the project AAR (archives audiovisuelles de la recherche). All the lectures are available in video, indexed content, here.
