= Shakespeare and Company (bookstore) =

English-language bookstore in Paris

Coordinates: 48°51′09″N 2°20′49″E

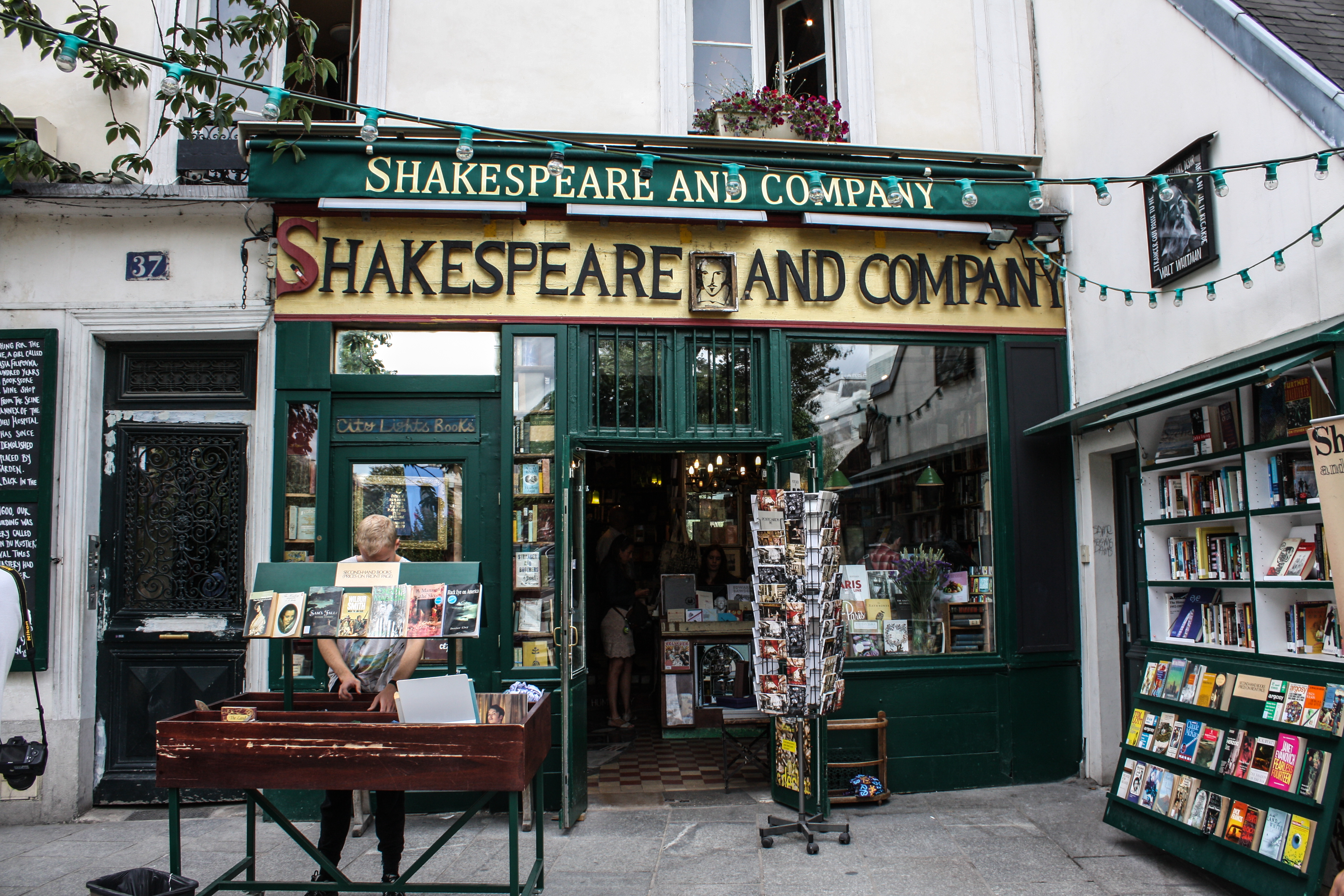
- "Shakespeare and Company" store, Paris, 2013
- Interactive map of Shakespeare and Company
- Location: Left Bank, Paris, France
- Owner: George Whitman (1951–2011); Sylvia Whitman (2011–present)
- Type: Bookstore

Construction
- Opened: August 1951; 75 years ago

Website
- shakespeareandcompany.com

Shakespeare and Company is an English-language bookstore opened in 1951 by George Whitman, located on Paris's Left Bank.

The store was named after Sylvia Beach's bookstore of the same name founded in 1919 on the Left Bank, which closed in 1941. Whitman adopted the "Shakespeare and Company" name for his store in 1964.

The bookstore is situated at 37 rue de la Bûcherie, in the 5th arrondissement. Opened in 1951 by American George Whitman, it was originally called "Le Mistral", but was renamed to "Shakespeare and Company" in 1964 in tribute to Sylvia Beach's store and on the 400th anniversary of William Shakespeare's birth. Today, it continues to serve as a purveyor of new and second-hand books, as an antiquarian bookseller, and as a free reading library open to the public.

Additionally, the shop houses aspiring writers and artists in exchange for helping out around the bookstore. Since the shop opened in 1951, more than 30,000 people have slept in the beds found tucked between bookshelves. The shop's motto, "Be Not Inhospitable to Strangers Lest They Be Angels in Disguise", is written above the entrance to the reading library.

== History ==
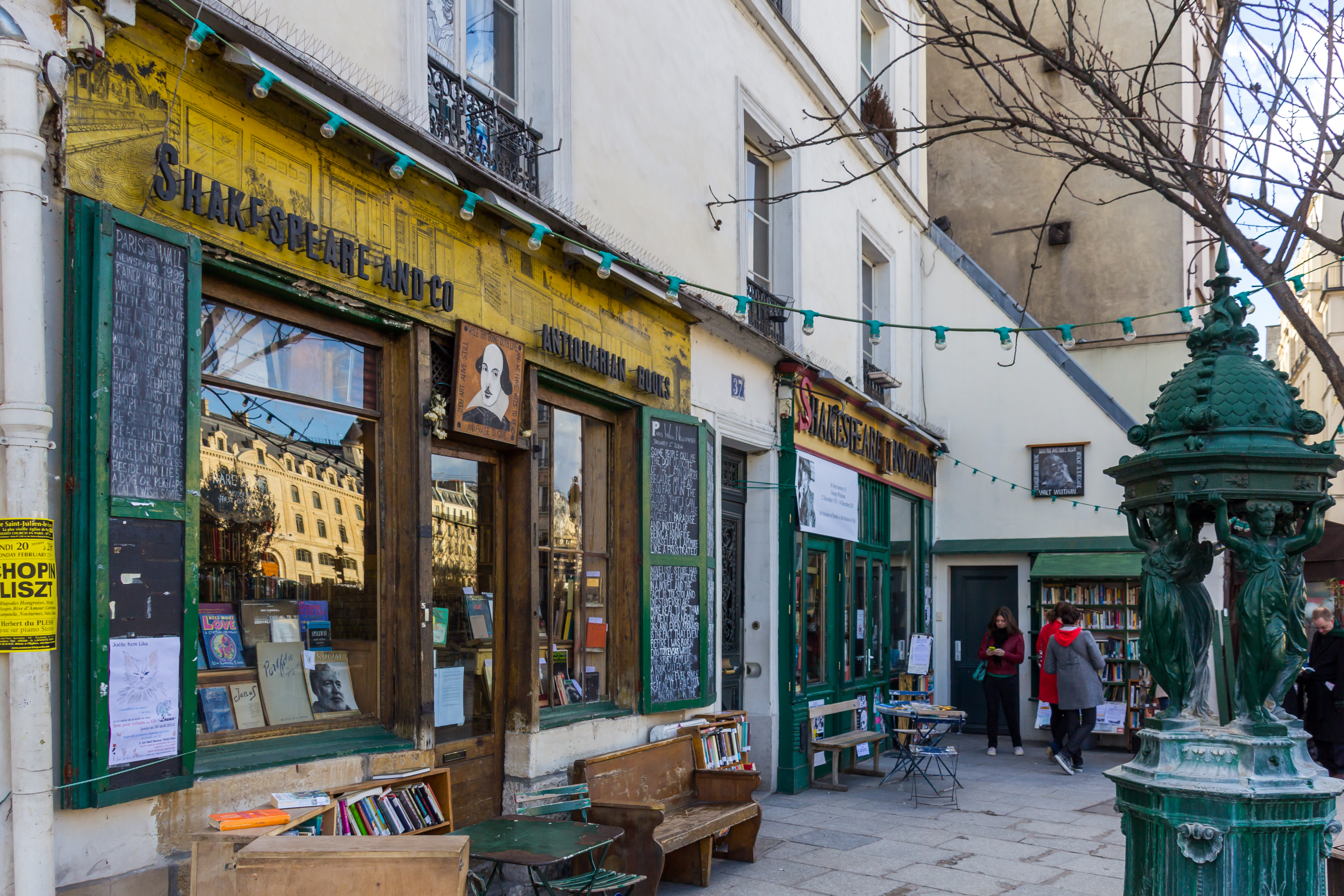
Full view of the exterior of Shakespeare and Company, including its antiquarian room section on the left (2007)

In 1951, American ex-serviceman George Whitman opened an English-language bookstore on Paris's Left Bank under the name of "Le Mistral". Its premises, the site of a 16th-century monastery, are at 37 rue de la Bûcherie, near Place Saint-Michel, just steps from the Seine, Notre-Dame and the Île de la Cité.

Much like Sylvia Beach's historic Shakespeare and Company bookstore which had closed in 1941, Whitman's store quickly became the focal point of literary culture in expatriate bohemian Paris. Early habitués included writers of the Beat Generation – Allen Ginsberg, Gregory Corso, and William S. Burroughs, who is said to have researched sections of Naked Lunch in the medical section of the bookstore's library. Other visitors were James Baldwin, Anaïs Nin, Julio Cortázar, Richard Wright, Lawrence Durrell, Max Ernst, Bertolt Brecht, William Saroyan, Terry Southern, and editors of The Paris Review, such as George Plimpton, Peter Matthiessen, and Robert Silvers.

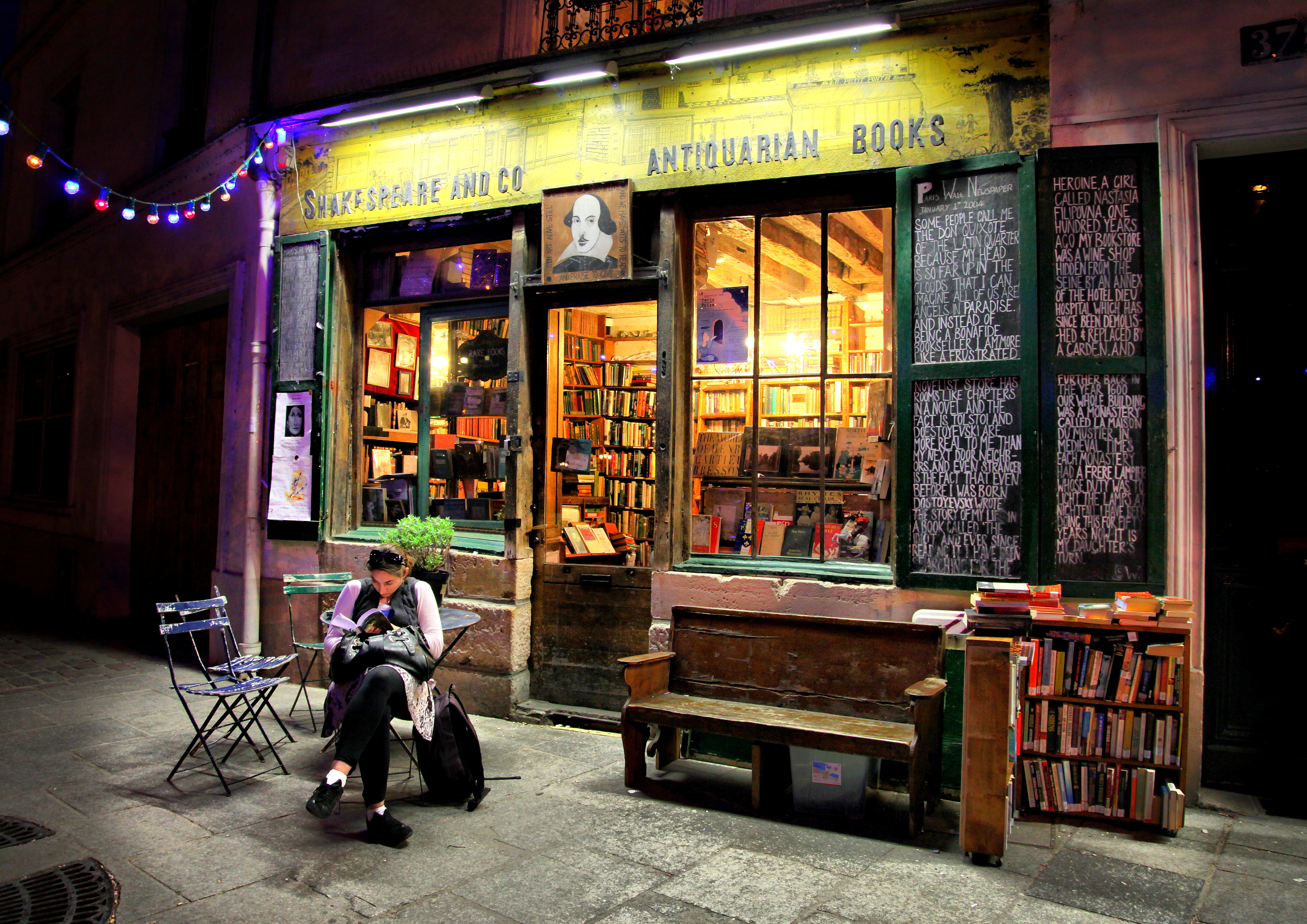
Shakespeare and Company's antiquarian room entrance, at night (2011)

George Whitman had modeled his shop after Sylvia Beach's. In 1958, while dining with Whitman at a party for James Jones who had newly arrived in Paris, Beach announced that she was handing the name to him for his bookshop. In 1964, after Sylvia Beach's death and on the 400th anniversary of William Shakespeare's birth, Whitman renamed his store "Shakespeare and Company," which is, as he described it, "a novel in three words."

Whitman called his venture "a socialist utopia masquerading as a bookstore". Henry Miller called it "a wonderland of books". The shop has beds tucked among the shelves of books where aspiring writers are invited to sleep for free in exchange for helping around the bookshop, agreeing to read a book a day, and writing a one-page autobiography for the shop's archives. These guests are called "Tumbleweeds", after the plants that "blow in and out on the winds of chance", as Whitman described. An estimated 30,000 people have stayed at the shop since it opened in 1951.

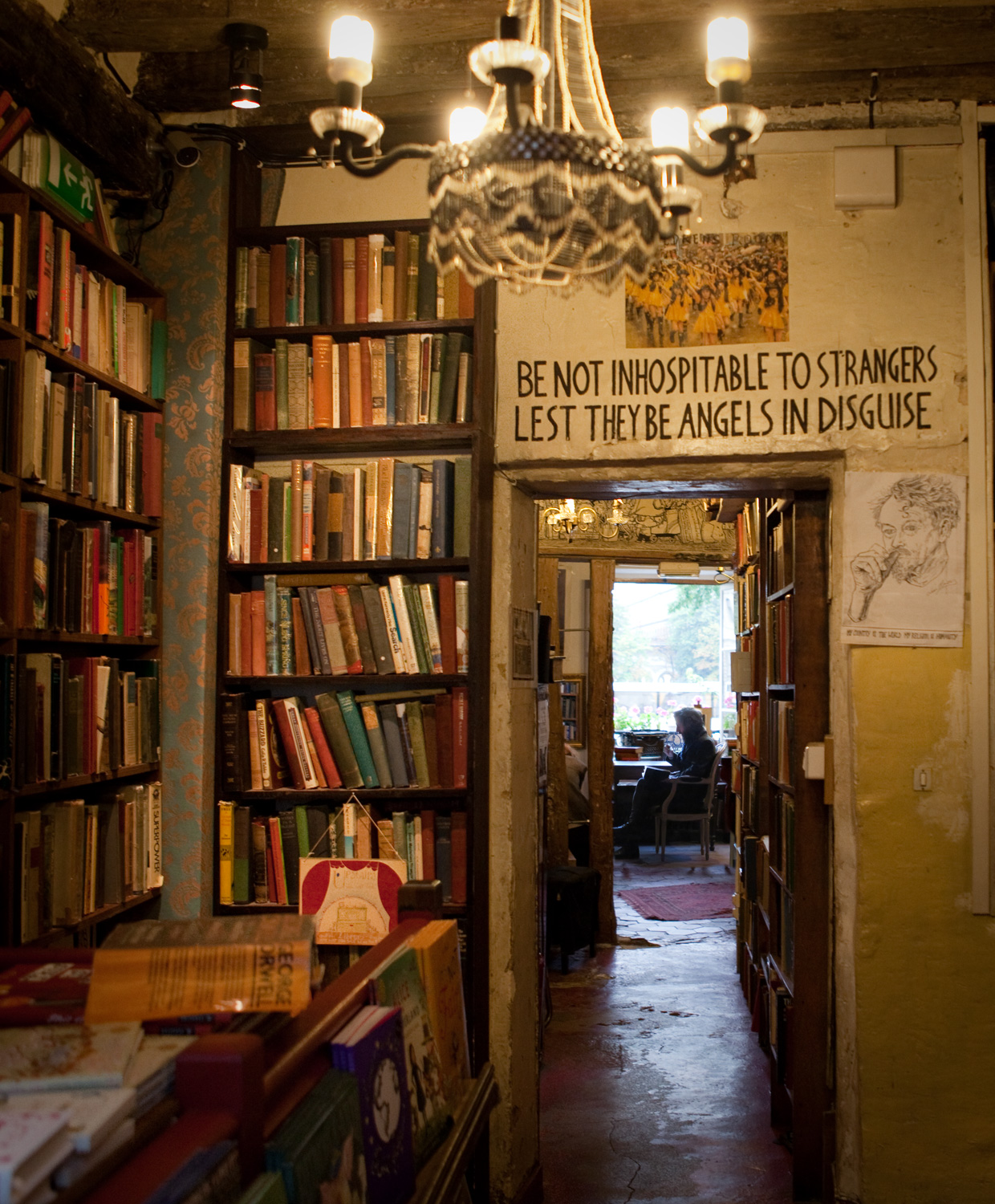
Shakespeare and Company, entrance to reading library, 2015

Whitman's only child, Sylvia Whitman, named after Sylvia Beach, began helping her father with management of the bookstore in 2003. She now runs the store with her partner, David Delannet, in the same manner as her father did. Regular activities are a Sunday Tea Party, writers' workshops, and weekly events that have included writers such as Dave Eggers, A. M. Homes, Jonathan Safran Foer, and Naomi Klein.

In 2003, Sylvia Whitman founded FestivalandCo, a literary festival that was held biennially at the park next-door to the bookstore, Square René-Viviani. Participants included Paul Auster, Siri Hustvedt, Jeanette Winterson, Jung Chang, and Marjane Satrapi.

George Whitman was awarded the Officier de l’Ordre des Arts et des Lettres in 2006, one of France's highest cultural honors.

In 2010, the bookstore launched The Paris Literary Prize for unpublished novellas, with a top prize of 10,000 euro provided by the de Groot Foundation. The winner of the first contest was Rosa Rankin-Gee, whose entry, The Last Kings of Sark, was subsequently published by Virago. The winner of the second prize was C. E. Smith; his entry, Body Electric, was co-published by the bookstore and The White Review.

George Whitman died at the age of 98 on 14 December 2011, in his apartment above the bookstore. His daughter Sylvia now runs the store.

Partnering with Bob's Bake Shop, Shakespeare and Company opened a café in 2015, located next door to the store in what had been, since 1981, an abandoned garage. The café serves primarily vegetarian food, with vegan and gluten-free options. George Whitman had been trying to open a literary café in the same space since as early as 1969.

At the end of October 2020, the bookstore reported that its sales had dropped 80% since March due to the outbreak of COVID-19. During the first lockdown in France, the bookstore was closed for two months and didn't sell online following the advice from the trade body of the Syndicat de la Librairie française. The owner of the bookstore informed the media that they were struggling, had exhausted their savings, and were grateful for any orders on the re-opened website.

== Publications ==
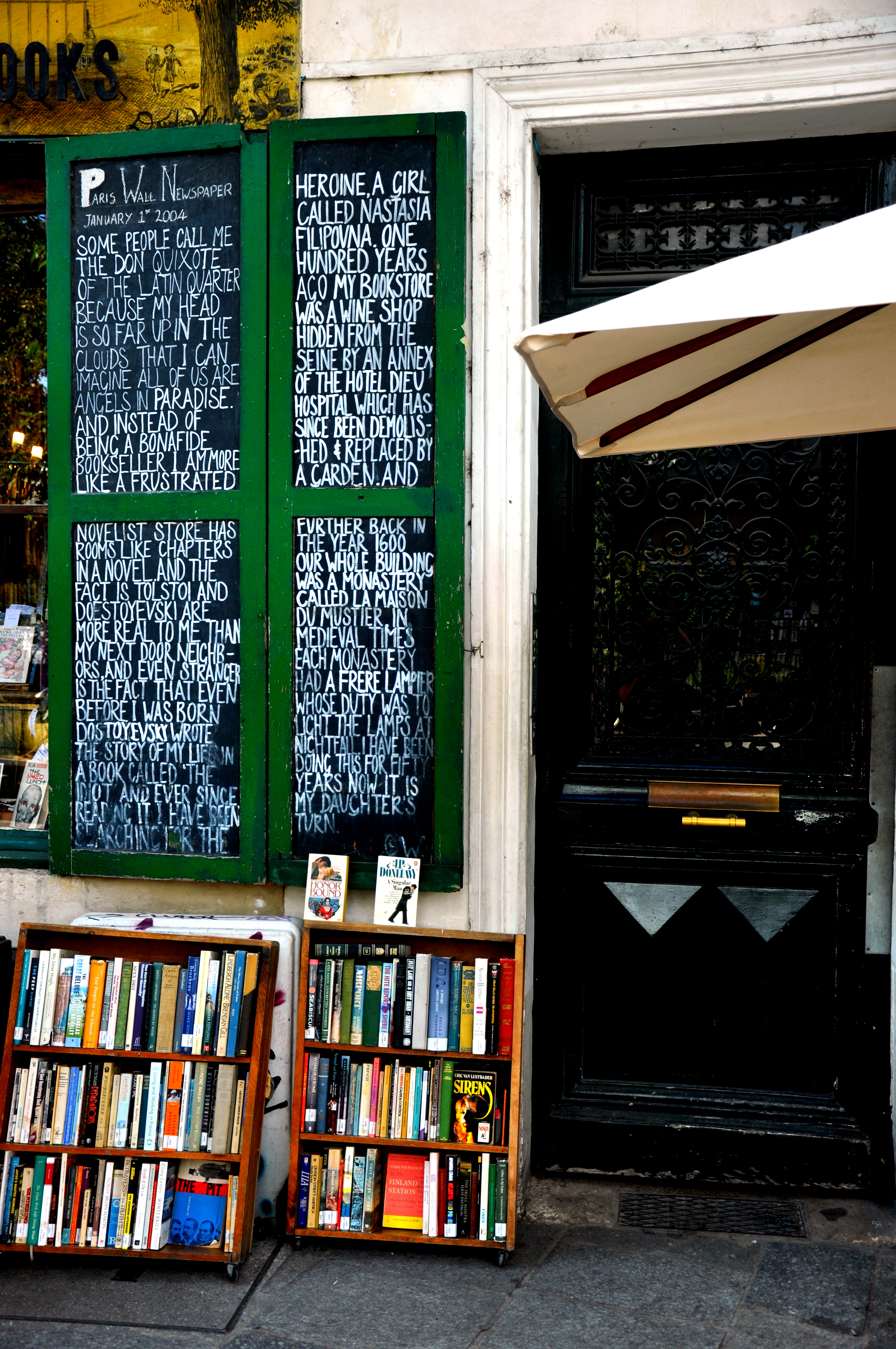
Founder George Whitman's manifesto on the front of the store

Several literary publications have had their editorial address at the bookstore, including the avant-garde journal Merlin, which is credited for having discovered Samuel Beckett, it being the first to publish him in English. Among the journal's editors were Richard Seaver, Christopher Logue, and Alexander Trocchi. Jane Lougee was the publisher. From 1959 to 1964, Jean Fanchette published Two Cities from the bookshop; the journal's patrons included Anaïs Nin and Lawrence Durrell, and it published, among others, Ted Hughes and Octavio Paz. From 1978 to 1981, a group of American and Canadian expatriates ran a literary journal out of the upstairs library, called Paris Voices. The journal published young writers such as Welsh poet Tony Curtis and Irish playwright and novelist Sebastian Barry. The editor-in-chief was Kenneth R. Timmerman and the editorial team included Canadian Antanas Sileika. Other publications established from the bookstore include Frank magazine, edited by David Applefield with contributions from writers such as Mavis Gallant and John Berger, and Whitman's own The Paris Magazine (or "The Poor Man's Paris Review", as he called it), with contributors including Lawrence Ferlinghetti, Jean-Paul Sartre, Marguerite Duras, Pablo Neruda, and—in a more recent edition--Lucy Sante, Michel Houellebecq, and Rivka Galchen. The first issue debuted in 1967, the most recent in 2010.

In 2016, the bookstore published its own history in a book titled Shakespeare and Company, Paris: A History of the Rag & Bone Shop of the Heart, edited by Krista Halverson with a foreword by Jeanette Winterson and an epilogue by Sylvia Whitman. Other contributors to the book include Ethan Hawke, Lawrence Ferlinghetti, Allen Ginsberg, Anaïs Nin, Robert Stone, Ian Rankin, Kae Tempest, and Jim Morrison. The book features an illustrated adaptation of Sylvia Beach's memoirs. It also includes a selection of George Whitman's letters and journals written along his "hobo adventures" during the Great Depression. The kindness he received from strangers along the way inspired the founding ethos of the bookstore: "Give what you can; take what you need."

== In popular culture ==
- Shakespeare and Company features in Richard Linklater's film Before Sunset, Nora Ephron's Julie & Julia, and in Woody Allen's Midnight in Paris.
- The store and the owner George Whitman were the subject of Portrait of a Bookstore as an Old Man, a 2003 documentary film directed by Benjamin Sutherland and Gonzague Pichelin.
- Shakespeare and Company is showcased in the Hong Kong TVB drama Triumph in the Skies 2 when characters Ron and Myolie Wu are reading and sleeping in the store.
- Shakespeare and Company is featured in the third season of Highlander: The Series as a bookstore in Paris operated by Watcher Don Salzer. In the fourth season, the Immortal Methos uses a hidden room in the bookstore's cellar as storage space for his ancient journals.
- The store is featured in an episode of Michael Palin's Hemingway Adventure (1999). The episode includes a brief interview with the owner, with several shots around the store.
- The store is featured in Jane Austen Wrecked My Life.
