= Jakarta International Literary Festival =

Indonesian literary festival

Jakarta International Literary Festival JILF
- Genre: Literary festival
- Dates: 20–24 August 2019
- Location(s): Jakarta, Indonesia
- Years active: 2019 – present
- Website: https://www.jilf.id/

Jakarta International Literary Festival or JILF is an annual literary festival held at Jakarta in Indonesia. The goal of the festival is to promote Indonesian literature in international literary platforms. The first literary festival was taken place at the Taman Ismail Marzuki, which was initiated by Jakarta Arts Council. The Jakarta Arts Council is an organization founded by Indonesian artists, which had been officially stated by then Governor of Jakarta, Ali Sadikin, on June 17, 1969.

Authors from Asia and Africa are to participate in the festival.
