= The Children's Bookshow =

The Children's Bookshow is an annual children's literature roadshow which visits theatres and schools across the United Kingdom in the autumn.

The Children's Bookshow was established in 2003 which was directed by Siân Williams, and it includes theatre performances by children writers, workshops in schools, and several competitions. The 2016 Children's Bookshow consisted of sixteen separate events, with authors from the UK and overseas, including Michael Rosen, Valerie Bloom and Fabio Geda.

In other years the tour has featured Judith Kerr, Quentin Blake, Kevin Crossley-Holland, Eva Ibbotson, Francesca Simon and Martin Waddell.
