= List of literary festivals =

Festival focused on literature

A literary festival, also known as a book festival or writers' festival, is a regular gathering of writers and readers, typically on an annual basis in a particular city. A literary festival usually features a variety of presentations and readings by authors, as well as other events, delivered over a period of several days, with the primary objectives of promoting the authors' books and fostering a love of literature and writing.

Writers' conferences are sometimes designed to provide an intellectual and academic focus for groups of writers without the involvement of the general public.

There are many literary festivals held around the world. Notable literary festivals include:

== Africa ==
=== Nigeria ===
- Port Harcourt Book Festival, October
- Chinua Achebe Literary Festival, November

== Asia ==
=== Bangladesh ===
- Hay Festival Dhaka, November

=== China ===
- Shanghai International Literary Festival

=== Hong Kong ===
- Hong Kong International Literary Festival, March

=== India ===
- Chandigarh Literati, November
- Dehradun Literature Festival, February
- Delhi Poetry Festival, January
- Gateway Litfest, February/March
- Guntur International Poetry Festival (GIPF), July
- Jaipur Literary Festival, January
- Jashn-e-Rekhta, Urdu literary festival held annually in New Delhi
- Kalinga Literary Festival (KLF), July
- Lit for Life, January/February
- Lucknow Literary Festival, February/March
- Ma Literature Festival, January/February
- Mathrubhumi International Festival of Letters
- Queer LitFest, Chennai (QLF), July/September
- Wayanad Literature Festival (WLF), Biennale, December
- Valley of Words International Literature & Arts Festival, November

=== Indonesia ===
- Jakarta International Literary Festival (JILF), August
- Ubud Writers and Readers Festival (UWRF), held annually at Ubud, Bali
- Makassar International Writers Festival (MIWF), held annually at Makassar

=== Malaysia ===
- George Town Literary Festival
- Kuala Lumpur International Literary Festival, July

=== Nepal ===
- Nepal Literature Festival

=== Pakistan ===
- Islamabad Literature Festival, April
- Karachi Literature Festival, February
- Lahore Literary Festival, February
- Sindh Literature Festival, January/February/March

=== Singapore ===
- Singapore Writers Festival, October/November

=== Sri Lanka ===
- Galle Literary Festival, January

=== Middle East ===
==== Israel ====
- Hebrew Book Week
- The Jerusalem International Writers Festival

==== United Arab Emirates ====
- Emirates Airline Festival of Literature, held annually in Dubai

== Australasia ==
=== Australia ===
- Adelaide Writers' Week, March
- Newcastle, New South Wales National Young Writers' Festival, September/October
- Perth Writers' Festival, February/March
- Sydney Writers' Festival, May

New Zealand

- Auckland Writers Festival, May
- WORD Christchurch, September
- VERB Wellington, September

== Europe ==
=== Austria ===
- Festival of German-Language Literature, Klagenfurt

=== Bosnia and Herzegovina ===
- Sarajevo Poetry Days, Sarajevo

=== Czech Republic ===
- Authors' Reading Month, July (held in Brno, Wroclaw, Kosice, Lviv, Ostrava)
- Prague Writers Festival, June

=== Denmark ===
- Louisiana Literature, August

=== England ===
- Black British Book Festival, October
- Bradford Literature Festival, June/July
- Bridport Literary Festival, November
- Cheltenham Literature Festival, October
- Chester Literature Festival, October
- The Children's Bookshow, Autumn
- Creative Folkestone Book Festival, November
- Hay Festival, May to June
- Harrogate International Festivals Theakstons Old Peculier Crime Writing Festival, July
- Hawkesbury Upton Literary Festival, April
- Jewish Book Week, February/March
- Lancaster Literature Festival, March and October
- Liverpool Literary Festival, October
- London Literature Festival, Autumn
- Manchester Literature Festival
- The North London Literary Festival, March/April
- Oxford Literary Festival, Spring
- Peak Literary Festival, October/November or May/June

=== Finland ===
- Helsinki Book Fair
- Lahti International Writers' Reunion LIWRE, June

=== France ===
- FestivalandCo, held in Paris at the Shakespeare and Company bookstore
- Rencontres aubrac, Aveyron

=== Germany ===
- Berlin International Literature Festival, September

=== Ireland ===
- Cúirt International Festival of Literature, Galway, April

=== Italy ===
- Festivaletteratura, held in Mantua, at the beginning of September

=== Norway ===
- Norwegian Festival of Literature, Lillehammer, is the largest literature festival in the Scandinavian countries since 1996
- Bergen International Literary Festival (LitFestBergen) is an annual festival for non-fiction and fiction established in 2019.

=== Poland ===
- Conrad Festival, Kraków, October. The largest literary festival in Central Europe.

=== Scotland ===
- Edinburgh International Book Festival, August, coinciding with the annual Edinburgh Festival
- Wigtown Book Festival

=== Sweden ===
- Göteborg Book Fair, Gothenburg, Sept
- WALTIC, Stockholm
- The Stockholm Writers Festival (Entering its ninth year)

=== Switzerland ===
- Literaturfestival Zürich, held annually since 2013

=== Turkey ===
- Istanbul Tanpınar Literature Festival, held in Istanbul, at the beginning of May

=== Wales ===
- The Hay Festival, May/June

== North America ==
=== Canada ===
- Banff Mountain Book Festival, October/November
- Eden Mills Writers' Festival, Eden Mills/Guelph, Ontario
- Festival of Literary Diversity, Brampton, Ontario
- The Frye Festival, Moncton, New Brunswick, April
- Toronto International Festival of Authors, October/November
- Whistler Writers Festival, Whistler, British Columbia, November
- Winnipeg International Writers Festival, September
- The Word on the Street, several cities
- Wordfest, Calgary, Alberta, October

=== Mexico ===
- Guadalajara International Book Fair, November/December

=== United States ===
- Boston Book Festival, October
- Brooklyn Book Festival, September
- Burlington Book Festival, September
- Children's Literature Festival at the University of Central Missouri, March
- The Curwood Festival, Owosso, Michigan, June
- Hollywood Book Festival, July
- Kentucky Women Writers Conference, Lexington, Kentucky, September
- Litquake, San Francisco, October
- Los Angeles Times Festival of Books, Los Angeles, California, April
- Miami Book Fair International, Miami, Florida, November
- National Book Festival, September
- New Orleans Poetry Festival, New Orleans, April
- Printers Row Lit Fest, Chicago, Illinois, September
- OC Book Fair, Tustin, California, November
- Tennessee Williams/ New Orleans Literary Festival, New Orleans, March
- Texas Book Festival, Austin, Texas, fall
- Tucson Festival of Books, Tucson, Arizona, March

=== Caribbean ===
==== Jamaica ====
- Calabash International Literary Festival, Treasure Beach, June

==== Trinidad and Tobago ====
- Bocas Lit Fest, April

== South America ==
=== Argentina ===
- International Poetry Festival of Rosario, Rosario

=== Brazil ===
- Festa Literária Internacional de Paraty, Paraty

=== Colombia ===
- International Poetry Festival of Medellín, Medellín

=== Peru ===
- Trujillo Book Festival, Trujillo, March
