= Jeanette Orrey =

British activist

Jeanette Orrey, MBE (born 1956) is a British children's food campaigner and former school 'dinner lady' who in 2012 received the MBE for her services to food in schools.

== Life ==
Orrey was the catering manager at St Peter's primary school in East Bridgford, Nottinghamshire for 14 years. In 2000, school dinner provision was deregulated from local authority control, at which point Orrey and St Peter's decided to change the school lunches to a menu of local food, cooked from scratch. Previously, as cook-supervisor at St Peter's, Orrey had been obliged to serve such things as 'free-flow mince' which she described as being 'probably from 11 different cows in 11 different countries', and various breaded shapes of processed meat including pork hippos, chicken teddies and Turkey Twizzlers. Orrey's revised menu included healthier dishes such as vegetable crumble and homemade fishcakes, with organic milk and local pork from Gloucester Old Spot pigs; her approach to school food has been credited with inspiring Jamie Oliver's campaigning work on school meals. She found that by very gradually replacing the processed food with home-cooked meals, the children's tastes slowly changed and they became less fussy. When asked to explain the secret of her success at St Peter's, Orrey has said 'Children copy each other. Convince one child to eat curry and the rest will follow'. In 2003, Orrey co founded Food for Life, a programme in British schools aimed at encouraging school kitchens to cook meals from scratch as well as teaching children how to cook and grow food.

In 2005, Orrey, who had by now left school catering to work as a school meals consultant, published her first cookbook The Dinner Lady (Bantam). The same year, Orrey set up a two-day training course for school caterers based at Ashlyns Organic Farm in Essex.

Orrey is currently School Meals Policy Advisor to the Soil Association. She co-chairs the School Food Plan Alliance.
