= Descant (magazine) =

Canadian literary magazine

- Editor: Karen Mulhallen
- Categories: Literary magazine
- Frequency: Quarterly
- Founded: 1970
- Final issue: 2015
- Country: Canada
- Based in: Toronto
- Language: English
- Website: www.descant.ca
- ISSN: 0382-909X

Descant (1970 – 2015) was a quarterly literary magazine that published new and established contemporary writers and visual artists from Canada and around the world, reflecting "a cosmopolitan awareness." It was established in 1970 as a mimeograph. Based in Toronto, in its later years Descant published two themed issues per year, and a winter and summer miscellany issue. From 2007 to 2014, Descant sponsored the Winston Collins/Descant Prize for Best Canadian Poem.

The list of contributors to Descant includes numerous now-famous Canadian authors. Many of these are listed in Bibliomania (No. 133, summer 2006) and Bibliomania 2 (No. 135, winter 2006) and include: Margaret Atwood, bill bissett, Nicole Brossard, Anne Carson, Camilla Gibb, Barbara Gowdy, Dennis Lee, Daphne Marlatt, Anne Michaels, Michael Ondaatje, Al Purdy, Leon Rooke, Jane Urquhart and Jan Zwicky.

The last issue of Descant, No. 167, was launched at Supermarket Restaurant and Bar, in Toronto, in January 2015.

A final party was held at Revival Bar in Toronto on March 25, 2015.

The magazine's extensive archives are located in the Thomas Fisher Rare Book Library at the University of Toronto.

== History ==
In 1970, a group of University of Toronto graduate students produced mimeographed copies of the first issue of Descant for the Graduate English Association. Jane Shen was the first editor of Descant and Karen Mulhallen became the editor in 1973 for all subsequent issues. The magazine was run out of her home for the first six years she was editor; Managing Editor Maria (Gould) Meindl worked in Karen Mulhallen's home office for three years.

Descant received Charitable organizations (Canada) status in 1988.

From 1972 until the last issue published in 2015, the magazine was perfect bound. There are approximately 25 contributors per issue, in poetry, fiction and non-fiction, as well as visual artists in photography, painting and mixed media. A number of issues include a full-colour gatefold and, since issue No. 133, the magazine includes colour in the text as well. Several issues are double issues.

Three of Descant magazine's special issues were also published as books: Views from the North (The Porcupine's Quill, 1984; out of print); Patria, by R. Murray Schafer (Coach House Books, 2002); and Tasks of Passion: Dennis Lee at Mid-career (Descant Editions, 1982).

Four anthologies of student-teacher writing were published as part of Descant's Students, Writers and Teachers (SWAT) outreach programme: Armadillo (2008), Barracuda (2009), Capybara (2011) and Dromedary (2011).

In 1995, HarperCollins published Paper Guitar: 27 Writers Celebrate 25 Years of Descant Magazine including contributions from Margaret Atwood, Rosemary Sullivan, Timothy Findley, Alberto Manguel, Katherine Govier, Leon Rooke, Evelyn Lau and W. P. Kinsella.

From 1993 until its close in 2015, the Descant office was located in the historic George Brown House (Toronto), at 50 Baldwin Avenue in Toronto.

In December 2014, Karen Mulhallen announced that the magazine would be closing due to ongoing financial hardship. Descant ceased publication with its last issue in the winter of 2014, after 45 years of publication. The last issue, No. 167, In a Cabinet of Curiosities, was launched in Toronto in January 2015.

On March 25, 2015, Descant hosted a farewell party at Revival Bar in Toronto. The Master of Ceremonies was author Antanas Sileika, former Descant co-editor, and Director of the Humber College School for Writers.

Descant magazine maintains a limited social media presence through their website, blog and Twitter account.

== Awards ==
The magazine won six Canadian National Magazine Awards: Silver, poetry (1983); Gold, fiction (1989); Silver, Editorial Package (1998); Silver, essays (2002); Gold, poetry (2007); Silver, fiction (2010). It was nominated for poetry (2003; finalist 2006) and received Honourable Mentions in 1996 (fiction), 1997 (fiction), 2003 (poetry), 2004 (essays; poetry) and 2006 (poetry; words and pictures).

Descant is also the recipient of the Writers' Trust of Canada Journey Prize for fiction, (1995; nominee 1997 and 2003). In 2014, contributing writer Lori McNulty was shortlisted for the Journey Prize.

In 1988, Descant magazine won the Litho Award for Outstanding Achievement in the Printing Industry.

== Structure and operating grants ==
Descant magazine was published by the Descant Arts and Letters Foundation, a legally separate entity with no editorial input into the magazine. A managing editor position was filled on a part-time basis. Design and technical support were employed on a contract basis. Submissions to the magazine were assessed by volunteers at open editorial meetings. Volunteer co-editors worked with interns and contract support to produce the magazine. Contributing editors to the magazine were: Kay Armatage, Mark Kingwell, Alberto Manguel, and Rosemary Sullivan.

Among other sources of financial support, Descant received the following operating grants from 1974 to 2014:

- 1974–2011 Canada Council Operating Grants
- 1974–2011 Ontario Arts Council Operating Grants
- 2009–2014 Ontario Arts Council Operating Grants
- 2009–2014 Canada Council Operating Grants

== Literary outreach programmes ==
Descant developed and received funding for a number of literary outreach programs: SWAT (students, writers and teachers workshops), Operation Springboard (writing workshops with young people in conflict with the law), Now Hear This! (literary workshops and support for at-risk youth; connected professional authors with community groups and aspiring student writers), and grief-writing workshops.

== Winston Collins/Descant Prize for Best Canadian Poem ==
This prize was awarded from 2007 to 2014. Winners and judges are listed on the Descant website. Each year two judges were chosen: one man and one woman, one living outside of Ontario, and neither one a published poet. Prize winners received CDN $1,000.

== See also ==
- List of literary magazines
