= Hong Kong International Literary Festival =

The Hong Kong International Literary Festival is an international literary festival held annually in Hong Kong. It was founded in 2000 by Nury Vittachi and creative writing teacher Jane Camens, with support from Malaysian poet Shirley Geok-lin Lim. The first festival was held in 2001. The 19th Annual Hong Kong International Literary Festival was held between 1 November and 10 November 2019. In 2023, the Hong Kong International Literary Festival combined with the Young Readers Festival and held a streamlined festival in March, featuring both adult, youth and young reader literature. The 2024 Hong Kong Literary and Young Reader's Festival will take place from 4-10 March 2024.

Previous attendees have included Seamus Heaney, Jung Chang, Louis de Bernières, Junot Díaz, Colm Tóibín, Yann Martell, Margaret Atwood, André Brink, John Banville, Hanif Kureishi, Amitav Ghosh, Ian McEwan, Alexander McCall Smith, Jeffrey Archer, John Boyne, Anne Enright, Benjamin Zephaniah, Carol Ann Duffy, Pankaj Mishra, Irvine Welsh, Cheryl Strayed, Pico Ayer, Amy Tan.

The Hong Kong International Literary Festival is managed by Hong Kong International Literary Festival Ltd, a registered charity in Hong Kong that founded and manages the annual Hong Kong International Young Readers Festival since 2012.
