= Miele Guide =

Asian regional restaurant guide book

The Miele Guide is a regional guide book to restaurants in Asia. The 2008/2009 edition which was published at the end of October 2008, launched the first in an annual series, which ranked and showcased the top 20 restaurants in Asia, as well as categorised restaurants according to the city and country they are in. It is published by Singapore-based Ate Media, and officially sponsored by the German home appliance maker Miele. Other official partners include TIME Magazine, Visa Inc. and Hyatt Hotels. The guide does not accept advertising and none of the official partners have any influence on the multi-round judging process.

== History ==
The Miele Guide was created by Aun Koh and Tan Su-Lyn as they felt there is no authoritative reference to restaurants in Asia. Aun Koh is the director of Ate Media and also the noted blogger behind popular Singapore food blog, Chubbyhubby.net. As early as 2006, the blog featured entries discussing the lack of recognition for restaurants in Asia in international listings and rankings such as Restaurant Magazine's annual Top 50 list Restaurant (magazine) Top 50. A predecessor of the Miele Guide was probably Koh's early efforts to compile an alternative list of Asia's best restaurants through online polling on his website.

== Restaurant Rankings and Listings ==
=== Geographical Coverage ===
The first printed edition of the Miele Guide was published at the end of October 2008. The 16 Asian countries evaluated by the Miele Guide in the first edition are: Brunei, Cambodia, China (including Hong Kong and Macau), India, Indonesia, Japan, South Korea, Laos, Malaysia, Myanmar, Philippines, Singapore, Sri Lanka, Taiwan, Thailand and Vietnam.

=== Judging Process ===
Each year's list of restaurants to be featured in the printed edition of the Miele Guide was compiled through four rigorous rounds of judging. In the initial round, the publishers worked with respected food critics at top magazines and newspapers across Asia, called the "shortlisting jury" to create a shortlist of restaurants for all the countries to be surveyed. In the second round, voting opens to the public on the website. In the third round, a special jury of more than 2000 food lovers and food and wine professionals cast their votes in a closed round of voting. In the final round, the Miele Guide's team, together with contributing editors across Asia, verifies the results by dining anonymously and independently, before the final list of restaurants is compiled.

Judges are not paid for their efforts.

=== Top 20 List ===
A key feature of the printed edition of the Miele Guide is the Top 20 restaurants in Asia list. The restaurants that emerge in the top 20 from the combined rounds of judging are featured and profiled in-depth. The top 20 restaurants are listed with a detailed description on the Guide's website.

=== Top Restaurant List ===
- 2008/09: Iggy's, Singapore.
- 2009/10: L'Atelier de Joel Robuchon, Hong Kong.
- 2010/11: Iggy's, Singapore.
