= Rue de la Bûcherie =

Street in Paris, France

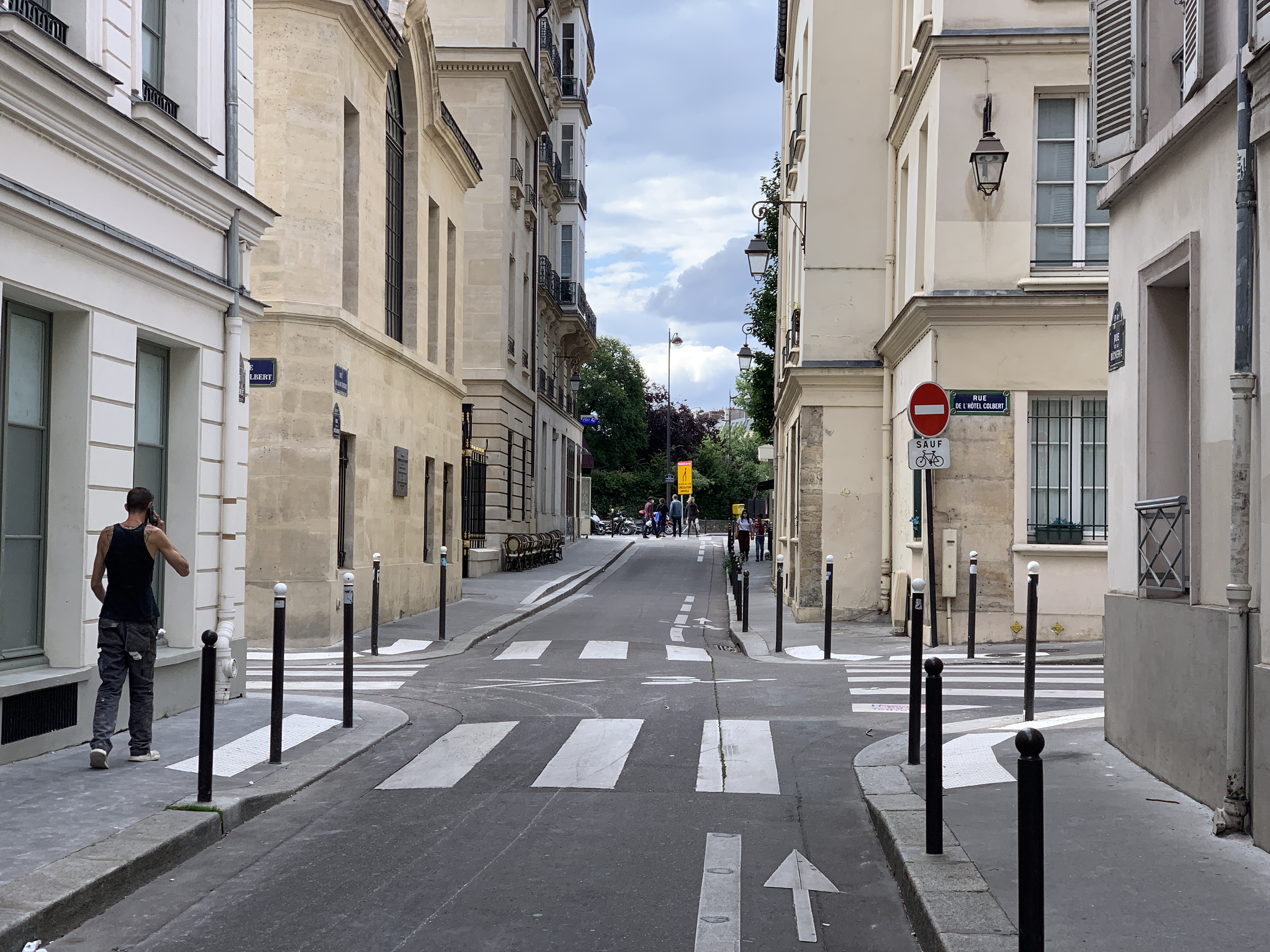
- The street in July 2021

- Location within Paris
- Length: 160 m (520 ft)
- Width: 8 m (26 ft)
- Arrondissement: 5th
- Quarter: Sorbonne
- Coordinates: 48°51′11″N 2°20′43″E
- From: Rue Saint-Julien-le-Pauvre
- To: Rue du Petit-Pont

Construction
- Completion: 17th century

The Rue de la Bûcherie (French pronunciation: [ʁy də la byʃʁi]) is a street in the 5th arrondissement of Paris, France.

== History ==
Near the cathedral Notre-Dame de Paris and the Place Maubert, between La Seine and the Boulevard Saint-Germain, the Rue de la Bûcherie is one of the oldest Rive Gauche streets. In the Middle Ages, damaged meats were salted and boiled there to feed the poorest.

In the 17th century, La Voisin, a chief personage in the famous affaire des poisons, which disgraced the reign of King Louis XIV, lived here.

Nicolas-Edme Rétif, the French novelist, lived on the Rue de la Bûcherie during the years leading to his death in 1806.

Until the late 1970s, the place was a popular Parisian street with modest international restaurants (Lebanese, Asian, Pakistani), antique dealers, and art galleries. In the 1970s, the Annick Gendron contemporary art gallery was established at no. 1.

The dissection amphitheatre of the ancient Faculty of Medicine where Jacques-Bénigne Winslow taught is still located on the Rue de la Bûcherie.

== Origin of the name ==
The name come from the ancient "Port aux bûches", a port used to bring logs into the city.

== Notable buildings ==
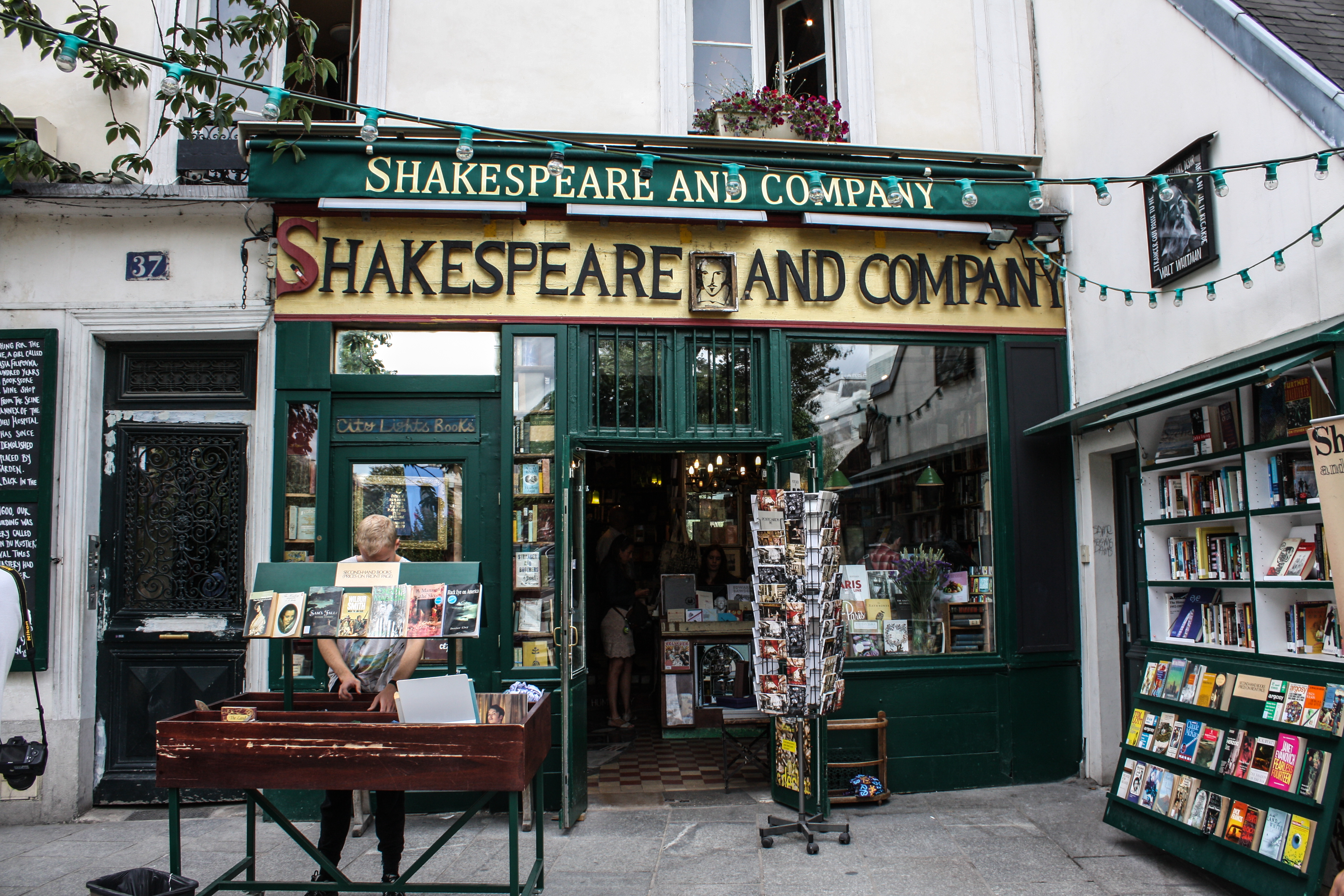
Shakespeare & Co Books at 37, Rue de la Bûcherie

- Nos. 13-15: amphitheatre of the ancient Faculty of Medicine
- No. 37: Shakespeare and Company, a bookstore specializing in English language books while simultaneously employing and boarding English-speaking writers in Paris.

== Closest transport ==
- Métro line 10, Maubert-Mutualité, Cluny-la-Sorbonne
