= Shanghai International Literary Festival =

Literary event in Shanghai, China, annually from 2003

The Shanghai International Literary Festival is an annual event held each March in China's largest city, Shanghai.

The festival started in 2003 as a sister event to the Hong Kong International Literary Festival. Hosted at M on the Bund and the Glamour Bar, the Festival grew from small beginnings to China’s leading, and largest, English-language literary event. At its peak (2006-2013), the festival extended over three weekends with a roster of over 50 international and local authors and an audience of more than 4,000. With the closing of the Glamour Bar in 2014, the festival has been reduced in size and duration, running for 10 days and featuring 25 authors.

The festival was started by Michelle Garnaut and Jenny Laing Peach in 2003 and attracts authors from around the world and at home in China, covering fiction, literary non-fiction, journalism, poetry and children’s writing. Activities include interactive forums, sessions in other languages such as Mandarin, Italian and French, as well as sessions with writers.

== See also ==
- Paula Morris writes about her experience at attending the festival in 2006
