= List of literary festivals in India =

This is a list of notable literary festivals in India. The list consists only of those festivals that already have an article on Wikipedia.

== Ongoing Festivals ==
State / Union Territory	City	Festival name	Organised by	Month	First held
Andhra Pradesh	Guntur	Guntur International Poetry Festival (GIPF)		June-July	2008
Bihar	Patna	Patna Literary Festival		August	
Bihar	Nalanda	Nalanda Literature Festival	Dhanu Bihar	December	
Chandigarh	Chandigarh	Chandigarh Literati	Chandigarh Literary Society	November - December	2013
Delhi	New Delhi	Jashn-e-Rekhta	Rekhta Foundation		2015
Delhi	New Delhi	Delhi Literature Festival		December	2013
Goa	Panaji	Goa Arts and Literature Festival	International Centre, Goa	December	2010
Gujarat	Ahmedabad	Ahmedabad International Literature Festival	IKON Education Foundation	November - December	2016
Gujarat	Ahmedabad	Gujarat Literature Festival		December - January	2014
Jammu and Kashmir	Srinagar	Kashmir Literature Festival			
Jharkhand	Jamshedpur	Jamshedpur Literature Festival	Vidyadeep Foundation	December	2025
Karnataka	Bengaluru	Alliance Literary Festival		February	2025
Kerala	Thiruvananthapuram	Mathrubhumi International Festival of Letters	Mathrubhumi newspaper group	January - February	2018
Kerala	Kozhikode	Kerala Literature Festival	DC Kizhakemuri Foundation	January - February	2016
Kerala	Kochi	Kochi International Book Festival	AntharashtraPusthakotsava Samithi, Kochi	December	2000
Kerala	Wayanad	Wayanad Literature Festival	Wayanad Literary Foundation	December	2022
Maharashtra	Mumbai	Gateway Litfest	Passion 4 Communication & Kaakka, Mumbai	February - March	2015
Maharashtra	Pune	Pune International Literary Festival		September	2013
Odisha	Bhubaneswar	Kalinga Literary Festival		June	2013
Rajasthan	Jaipur	Jaipur Literature Festival		January	2006
Rajasthan	Udaipur	The Great Indian Literary Festival		January - February	2017
Tamil Nadu	Chennai	Lit for Life	The Hindu newspaper	January	2010
Tamil Nadu	Chennai	Queer LitFest, Chennai	Queer Chennai Chronicles	September	2018
Telangana	Hyderabad	Hyderabad Literary Festival	Hyderabad Literary Trust	January	2010
Telangana	Hyderabad	Verba Maximus	BITS Pilani, Hyderabad Campus	January - February	2011
Uttar Pradesh	Lucknow	Lucknow Literary Festival	Lucknow Society	February - March	2013
Uttar Pradesh	Aligarh	AMU Literary Festival	Aligarh Muslim University	March	2015
Uttar Pradesh	Gorakhpur	Gorakhpur Literary Fest			2017
Uttar Pradesh	Gorakhpur	Yayawari Bhojpuri Mahotsav			2022
Uttar Pradesh	Jhansi	Bundelkhand Literature Festival	Suryam Foundation	February	2020
Uttarakhand	Dehradun	Dehradun Literature Festival		January - February	2016
West Bengal	Kolkata	Chair Poetry Evenings	Chair Literary Trust	November	2018
Kerala	Malappuram	Ma Literature Festival	MYL	January - February	2024
Various	Various	The Great Indian Film and Literature Festival			2012
Various	Various	Kitab Festival			

== Now defunct events ==
State / Union Territory	City	Festival name	Organised by	Last held
Delhi	New Delhi	Indian Languages Festival	India Habitat Centre	2019
Delhi	New Delhi	Kaafiya The Poetry Festival		2015
Kerala	Thiruvananthapuram	Viswa Malayala Mahotsavam 2012	Kerala Sahitya Akademi	2012
