= Bundelkhand Literature Festival =

- Status: Active
- Genre: Literary festival
- Frequency: Annually
- Locations: Jhansi, Uttar Pradesh, India
- Country: India
- Years active: 2020—present
- Founder: Chandra Pratap Singh (Pratap Raj)
- Major events: Panel discussion; Keynote; Interview; Poetry reading; Book reading; Book signing; Open mic; Musical performance
- Patron: Bundelkhand University
- Organiser: Bundelkhand Literature Festival Society
- Website: www.bundelkhandlitfest.org

Bundelkhand Literature Festival is a literary festival held annually in Jhansi, a part of Bundelkhand region, in Uttar Pradesh, India.

== History ==
Bundelkhand Literature Festival was founded in 2020 by social activist Chandra Pratap Singh, who serves as the founder and director of the festival. It was started with the aim of promoting the art and literature of Bundelkhand region.

== 2020 edition ==
The first edition of the Bundelkhand Literature Festival started at the Craft Fairground near the Jhansi Fort in Jhansi on 28 February 2020. It was attended by more than two dozen literary figures from the fields of Hindi and Bundeli literature, dramatics, journalism, cinema and television. It held discussions on different aspects of Bundeli and Hindi literature and culture. The festival was organized by the joint aegis of the Department of Hindi, Bundelkhand University and Bundelkhand Literature Festival Society.

The inaugural session of the festival was presided over by Prof J.V. Vaishampayan, the vice-chancellor of Bundelkhand State University. It was attended by eminent personalities, including Hindi novelist Maitri Pushpa, Padma Shri awardee Kailash Madbaiya and actor Raja Bundela.

=== Participants ===
The following literary figures participated in the 2020 BLF.

- Maitreyi Pushpa
- Padmashree Kailash Madbaiya
- Richa Anirudh
- Anikta Jain
- Naveen Chaudhary
- Aazam Quadri
- Prahlad Agrawal
- Indrajeet Singh
- Dinesh Shankar Shailendra
- Indira Dangi
- Kuldeep Raghav
- Geet Chaturvedi
- Vivek Mishra
- Raja Bundela
- Sushmita Mukherjee
- Dr. Sharad Singh
- Dr. Pankaj Chaturvedi
- Prof J.V. Vaishampayan

== 2021 edition ==
In 2021, the festival was cancelled due to the COVID-19 pandemic restrictions imposed by the government.

== 2022 edition ==
The second edition of the Bundelkhand Literature Festival was held from 14 to 16 October 2022 in Jhansi.

The festival featured parallel sessions across two venues, Hall Athai and Hall Mda, with discussions on topics such as Bundeli language in media and cinema, oral traditions, gender, folk culture, Dalit literature, and digital journalism. Literary figures like Shyauraj Singh Bechain, Chirag Jain, Girish Pankaj, and Teji Grover participated, along with many regional writers, artists, and journalists.

Cultural evenings included poetry recitations, folk performances, and a play on Amrita Pritam (Ek Hai Amrita) by Team TMP. A session dedicated to Jhansi Smart City and multiple discussions on the role of Hindi in freedom movements, education, and media ethics were also held.

On the final day, media personality Saeed Ansari delivered an address focused on journalism, critical thinking, and youth engagement, emphasizing the importance of asking informed questions, unbiased reporting, and developing writing skills. He was joined by I Chauk editor Dhirendra Rai.

== 2024 edition ==
The third edition of the Bundelkhand Literature Festival (BLF 3.0) was held in 2024, continuing its celebration of literature, art, and cultural heritage in the Bundelkhand region. The event featured a wide range of literary discussions, poetry sessions, film-related dialogues, and cultural performances. It also showcased exhibitions of local and contemporary art, including canvas painting, stone and wood art, and nail art, along with a curated book fair.

Among the key invitees were literary figures, journalists, artists, civil servants, and public intellectuals, including Harivansh Narayan Singh (Deputy Chairman, Rajya Sabha), Priyanka Gupta (Graduate Chaiwaali), Pankaj Chaturvedi, Saeed Ansari, Manoj Sinha, Gautam Rajrishi, Deepak Mashal, Naz Joshi, and several IPS/IAS officers and academicians such as Jaydeep Karnik, Shashank Garg, Ranjan Kumar, Tarun Bhatnagar, and Rajesh Kumar Mishra.

The festival was supported by youth-led volunteer teams, with much of the event decor handmade by local schoolchildren. The aim of BLF 3.0 was to promote awareness, preserve Bundelkhand’s linguistic and cultural identity, and inspire younger generations to engage with literature and the arts. The Management Partner for the event was BOOK Wala, and the Event Partner was Bundelkhand University.

== 2025 edition ==
The fourth edition of the Bundelkhand Literature Festival (BLF 4.0) took place on 21, 22 and 23 February 2025 . Continuing its legacy of celebrating literature, culture, art, and cinema, the upcoming season promises a diverse lineup of panel discussions, literary sessions, artistic exhibitions, and cultural performances.

BLF 4.0 aims to further strengthen the literary and artistic roots of the Bundelkhand region by bringing together acclaimed authors, poets, journalists, civil servants, and creative professionals from across India. With a focus on regional heritage and youth engagement, the festival will showcase Bundelkhand’s evolving role in contemporary cultural discourse.

Details regarding the schedule, guests, and venue will be announced soon. Attendees can expect an immersive experience that highlights the region’s linguistic diversity, folk traditions, and modern storytelling forms.

== Guests ==
- Sayeed Ansari
- Sadhna Singh
- Asif Khan
- Anushka Kaushik

== See also ==
- List of literary festivals in India
- Lucknow Literary Festival
- Gorakhpur Literary Fest
