= AMU Literary Festival =

Literary Festival organised in Aligarh University University

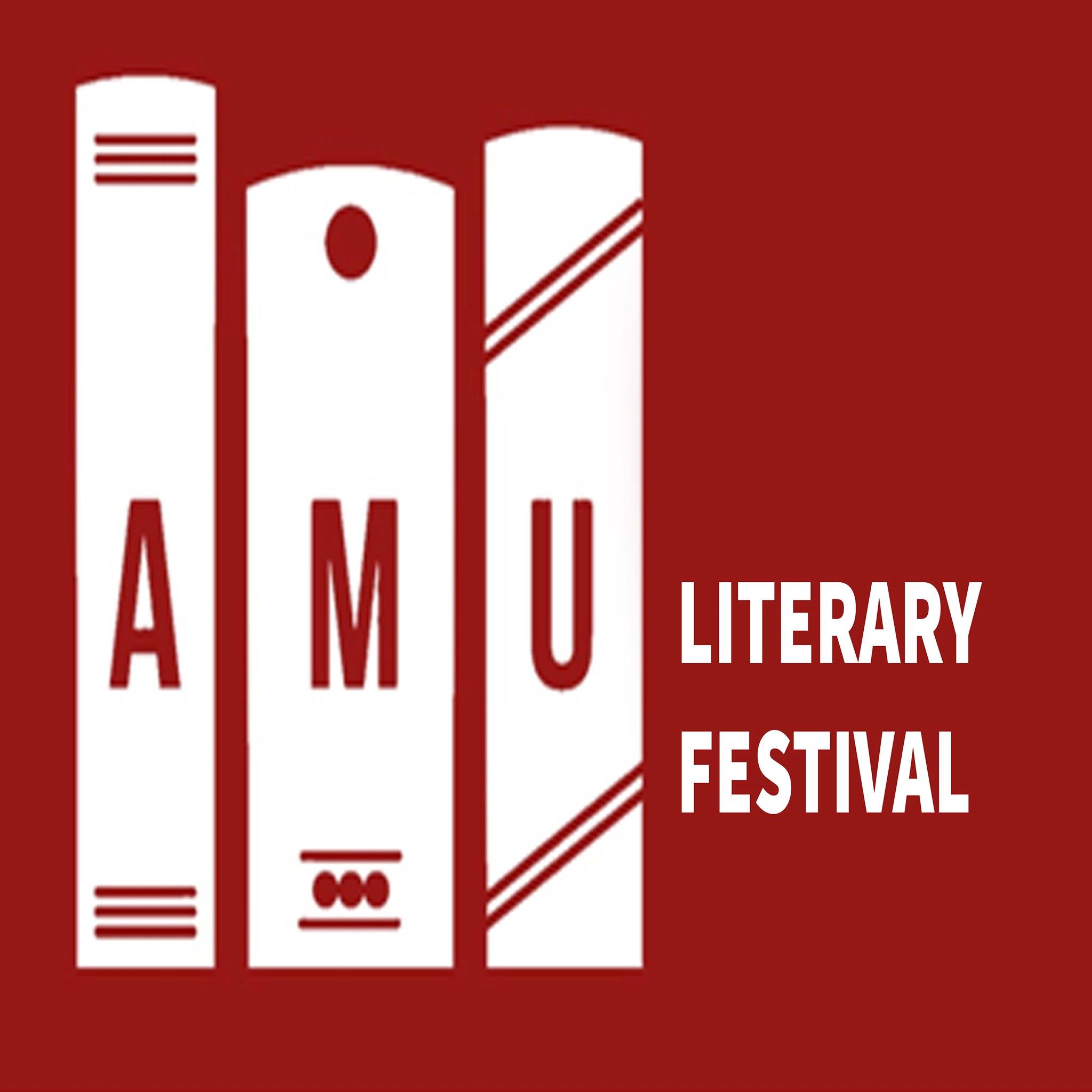
- Genre: Literary festival
- Frequency: Annually, Feb-March
- Venue: Kennedy House Complex
- Locations: Aligarh, Uttar Pradesh
- Country: India
- Years active: 2015–present
- Participants: Open for all
- Major events: Workshops, Lectures, Interaction sessions, Discussions
- Patrons: Vice-chancellor, AMU
- Organiser: University Debating and Literary Club, Aligarh Muslim University

AMU Literary Festival is an annual literary festival organised by Aligarh Muslim University. University Debating and Literary Club (UDLC) formerly University Literary Club of the university organises the festival. Some of the previous invitees include news anchor and author Rajdeep Sardesai, poet Keki N. Daruwalla, politician Mani Shankar Aiyar and independent journalist Rana Ayyub.

== Organisation ==
The festival is organized under the auspices of the University Literary and Debating Club of the Aligarh Muslim University. The club consists of students as its members. The Secretary steers the organisation and management. The festival is the University Debating and Literary Club's flagship event.

Journalists like Rajdeep Sardesai talking about media, activists such as Paranjoy Guha Thakurta talking about crony capitalism and novelists like Chandrahas Choudhury having panel discussions about the Indian novel; the festival is a diverse celebration of literature and mass communication, in all its forms.

The festival attracts audience from all across the city, transcending the boundary of the university. Previous invitees include the poet Keki N. Daruwalla, politician Mani Shankar Aiyar and independent journalist Rana Ayyub. With people from diverse areas coming together and talking about the issues of the day and age, the festival is truly a melting pot of culture. Workshops to teach students about the ins and outs of various forms of writing and public speaking are also conducted as a part of the festival, which rounds out the educational experience.

The University Literary Club was established in 1973. The club is the extension of the oldest literary Society of AMU, the "Muhammadan Anglo-Oriental College Literary Society" founded by Sir Syed Ahmad Khan himself. The University Literary Club was rechristened as University Debating and Literary Club in 2015.

== Past festivals ==
=== Lit Fest 2019 ===
The festival was organized from 8–10 March 2019.

Day 1, March 8, 2019

- Inaugural lecture by Mr. Siddhart Varadarajan on Under Siege- The Media and the Idea of a University. He talked about the media and educational institutions becoming besieged by certain forces, giving examples of controversies in universities like AMU and JNU. He also mentioned how social media has become a space to target the dissenters.
- Panel discussion on The Relevance of Literary Festivals by Mrs. Jaishree Misra, Mr. Jerry Pinto, and Prof. Shafey Kidwai, moderated by Ms. Alisha Ibkar. Mr. Jerry Pinto highlighted the importance of reading for the survival of democracy. Misra and Kidwai discussed literary festivals as the sites of self-exploration and revolution.
- Storytelling and Recitation by Syed Asghar Wajahat.
- The day ended with a cultural evening with the Secretary, President, and Coordinator of CEC managing the event.

Day 2, March 9, 2019

- There were a lot of panel discussions-

Reading Literature in the Age of 140 Characters by Mr. Jerry Pinto, Dr. Nafis Faizi, and Mr. Md. Danish Iqbal, moderated by Mr. Kashif Ilyas. The discussion was centered around the condition of literature in this age of extremities, and how instant gratification on social media and the shortening attention span of people has impacted literature.

Book Launch and Discussion on the book Lynch Files by Mr. Ziya Us Salam, moderated by Mr. Fawaz Shaheen. Mr. Ziya Us Salam talked about how murders in the past used to happen on religious grounds, but now lynchings are more of a conspiracy to target a particular person.

Ground(ed) Report in the Digital Scape by Mr.Mahtab Alam, Mr. Shoaib Daniyal, and Mr. Gulam Jeelani, moderated by Prof. Mohammad Sajjad. The panelists talked about the problems journalists encounter in the digital era of reporting. There were also discussions about how difficult it is to report on communal violence. The issue of fake news was an important point.

Majoritarianism: The Undoing of Democracy by Mr. Ziya Us Salam, Mr. Shoaib Daniyal, and Prof. Asmer Beg, moderated by Dr. Tarushikha Sarvesh. The major topics of discussion were minority issues, communal violence, the safety of women, etc.

Conversation on Mothering a Muslim by Ms. Nazia Erum. The book focuses on Muslim women, especially Muslim mothers, a group which, she said, has little representation in Indian literature. Professor Ayesha Munira was the other panelist.

The last event of the day was Zabaan-Daraaz by the University Drama Club.

Day 3, March 10, 2019

- There were two-panel discussions-

Urdu Novel ka Badalta Manzarnamah by Mr. Rahman Abbas, Prof. Shafey Kidwai, and Prof. Tariq Chhatari, moderated by Prof. Siraj Ajmali. They talked about the rising position of the Urdu language in Indian popular culture. Where short stories have made a comeback, the Urdu novel still hasn't found its place.

Literature and Resistance: Rethinking the Politics of Literature by Dr. Shah Alam Khan, Prof. Apoorvanand, Mr. Manoj Jha, and Mr. Harsh Mander, moderated by Dr. Irfanullah Faarooqui. The discussion revolved around the way literature has become a medium of dissent over the years, and how, in the current socio-political scenario, writers have to be careful with their words.

- Poetry session by Dr. Sukrita Kumar and Dr. Rekha Sethi.
- Lecture on Journalism in the Age of Muscular Nationalism by Mrs. Sagarika Ghose. The lecture was about the crude tactics of criminal intimidation that the government has adopted lately.
- Talk by Mr. Saurabh Dwivedi on Main aur Musalman, Aapbeeti, Jagbeeti. He talked about the stark difference he felt in his life as a journalist, after spending his childhood in a place with communal harmony.
- Session on Aks-e-Yusuf by Mr. Mohammad Sabeeh Bukhari, Mr Nadim Mahir and Prof. Shafey Kidwai.

At the end there was a tribute to Ankit Chadha & Dastan-e-Tamanna-e-Sarfaroshi, and the LitFest 2019 concluded with a qawwali by the Folk and Traditional Music Club of Aligarh Muslim University.

- List of Guests in 2019

Name	Field
Siddharth Vardarajan	Journalist, academic, founding editor of https://thewire.in
Nazia Erum	Journalist and author
Sagarika Ghose	Journalist, columnist and author
Jaishree Misra	Indian writer and journalist
Ziya Us Salam	Writer and journalist
Apoorvanand	Professor, Delhi University, Social critic
Mahtab Alam	Executive Editor- The Wire Urdu, journalist and writer
Shah Alam Khan	Author and Professor of Orthopaedics, AIIMS, New Delhi
Manoj Jha	Author and Professor, University of Delhi, Member of Rajya Sabha
Saurabh Dwivedi	Editor, TheLallantop.com
Shoaib Daniyal	Journalist
Harsh Mander	Director, Centre of Equity Studies and Social activist
Asghar Wajahat	Scholar, novelist, playwright and television scriptwriter
Gulam Jeelani	Journalist and assistant editor of Mail Today
Jerry Pinto	Author, poet, and recipient of the Sahitya Akademi Award (2016)
Rahman Abbas	Author and Sahitya Akademi Award Winner (2018)

=== Lit Fest 2018 ===
The festival was organized from 9–11 March 2018.

Day 1, 9 March 2018

- Sankarshan Thakur declared the LitFest open with his inaugural lecture on 'The Necessity of Speaking'.
- DastanGoi: Tilism-e-Hoshruba was performed by Meera Rizvi and Syed Shadab Hussain. Directed by Mahmood Farooqui and produced by Anusha Rizvi.

Day 2, 10 March 2018

- Panel discussion on Urdu Zubaan o Adab ka Haal aur Mustaqbil by Sanjeev Saraf. Dr. Siraj Ajmali was the moderator.
- Poetry recitation by UDLC members with Sudhanshu Firdaus.
- There was also a book reading session-

An Ordinary Man's Guide to Radicalism by Neyaz Faarooqui

Clouds by Chandrahas Choudhury

- A panel discussion on The Case/Curse of Caste in India with Prof. Satish Deshpande and Shuddhabrata Sen Gupta. The session was moderated by Md. Danish Iqbal.
- Another panel discussion on Populism in the Age of Conspicuous Consumption involving Mukul Kesavan, Prof. Saugata Bhaduri, and Kalpana Sharma, moderated by Riad Azam.
- Muzamil Jaleel, deputy editor of Indian Express gave a lecture.
- There were numerous other panel discussions-

Ghalib ke Khatoot & Faiz and Alys Faiz's Letters presented by Impresario Asia, Shamir Abadan, Mannu Kohli and K.K Kohli.

Day 3, 11 March 2018

Life Imitating Literature or Literature Imitating Life: A Debate in the Context of Identities- Chandrahas Chaudhury Akhilesh, Prof. Asim Siddiqui. Moderator- Dr. Irfanullah Farooqi

Disabled Literature: Creative Writing, Pedagogy and Politics of Disability Representation- Dr. Hemchandran Karah, Dr. Jyothsna Phanija, Boopathi P. Moderator- Alisha Ibkar

People as Numbers: Re-engaging with Politics and Democracy in India- Prof. Apoorvanand Jha, chaired by Prof. Mirza Asmer Beg

- There was also a book reading session by Farah Naqvi, as well as a poetry recitation session.
- The last event was The Art of Storytelling by Neelesh Misra.
- List of Guests in 2018

Name	Field
Sankarshan Thakur	Print journalist
Sanjeev Saraf	Founder, chairman, and principal shareholder of Polyplex Corporation Limited
Satish Deshpande	Professor of Sociology, University of Delhi
Kalpana Sharma	Columnist and former deputy editor of The Hindu
Dr. Saugata Bhaduri	Professor at Centre for English Studies, Jawaharlal Nehru University
Jyothsna Phanija	Poet, Fiction Writer, editor, and essayist
Neelesh Misra	Journalist, author, radio storyteller, scriptwriter, and lyricist
Mukul Kesavan	Indian historian, novelist, political and social essayist

=== Lit Fest 2017 ===
The festival was organized from 3–5 March 2017.

- List of Guests in 2017

Name	Field
Swara Bhaskar	Actress
Ashok Vajpeyi	Poet in Hindi, essayist, literary-cultural critic, and a former civil servant
Prof. Manoj K Jha	Professor of Social Work
Aditi Rao	Poet, activist and essayist.
Zafar Anjum	Author and journalist
Tushar Gandhi	Journalist
Hansda Sowvendra Shekhar	Medical officer and activist
Omair Ahmad	Writer
Hilal Ahmed	Editor, writer, teacher and producer
de:Chandrahas Choudhury	Literary critic and novelist

=== Literary Festival (2016) ===
- List of Guests

Name	Field	Video link
Rajdeep Sardesai	News anchor and author	Watch video - 1, 2, 3
Paranjoy Guha Thakurta	Journalist and political commentator	Watch video - 1, 2
Keki N. Daruwalla	Poet and writer	Watch video - 1, 2, 3, 4
Mani Shankar Aiyar	Diplomat and politician	Watch video - 1, 2
de:Chandrahas Choudhury	Literary critic and novelist
Mariam Karim Ahlawat	Teacher, freelance editor and a writer
Satyarth Nayak	Author, script-writer & journalist
Nivedita Menon	Feminist writer and professor	Watch video - 1, 2, 3, 4
Rana Safavi	Author and historian
Sarwat Khan	Contemporary Urdu writer

=== Literary Festival 2015 ===
==== List of guests ====
Name	Field	Video link
Jerry Pinto	Writer and journalist	Watch video - 1, 2, 3, 4
Sudeep Sen	Poet and editor	
Syed Asghar Wajahat	Scholar, novelist, independent documentary filmmaker and television scriptwriter	
Rakhshanda Jalil	Writer, critic and literary historian	
Radha Chakravarty	Writer, critic and translator	
Prof. Purushottam Agrawal	Academician, novelist, literary critique, theologian, secularist, columnist and broadcaster	
Aseem Ahmed Abbasee	Lyricst poet and creative writer	
Yaseen Anwer	Multilingual poet	
Kausar Munir	Lyricist and screenwriter	
Rana Ayyub	Journalist and independent columnist	Watch video - 1, 2
Sami Ahmad Khan	Author	
Manisha Sethi	Teacher and author	
Hilal Ahmed	Editor, writer, teacher and producer	
Dr. Saamdu Chettri	Head of first Gross National Happiness Centre	

== Aligarh Muslim University Literature Festival 2025 ==
The Aligarh Muslim University Literature Festival 2025, the largest student-managed literary festival, was successfully held from February 23 to 25, 2025, at Kennedy Auditorium, Kennedy House Complex, Aligarh Muslim University under the stewardship of Mohammad Shams Uddoha Khan, Secretary, University Debating and Literary Club. The festival, organised by the University Debating and Literary Club, Cultural Education Centre, Aligarh Muslim University, marked its return after a three-year hiatus.

Prof. (Emeritus) Irfan Habib in his Inaugural address said, “Whatever be our means of communication whether debates or writing articles, we have a great cause to uphold. The cause of reason. The cause of humanity.” He expressed his desire for ideas rather than debating and said that the liberty of thought and ideas should be preserved in universities. He further emphasised on, “As students of the university we should be resistant to change, resistant to offense and to take up the baton of the previous generation and carry it forward”

“Story telling is a moral enterprise, at its root and heart” said Sam North, Man-Booker Prize Long-listed novelist as well as an Honorary Professor of Creative Writing at the University of Exeter. “Around this idea of looking at the behaviour of each of one of ourselves, we gossip and tell each other stories in our heads. Us talking to each other about each other. Gossip turns into stories. Best gossip lasts and is repeated”, he added.

Dr. Geetanjali Singh Chanda of Ashoka University, former senior lecturer at Yale University, congratulated the club for a well stimulating programme and for the warmth and consideration given to them. She expressed her happiness to be a part of the revival of the Litfest. "All of you made me feel utterly as if I was a part of this institution—of this university.” she said. She delineated on the historical legacy of AMU,”This is Aligarh Muslim University and has Muslim in its name but is secular at heart” and from its inception has been “associated with the Progressive Writers Movement”.

Prof. Kamalanand Jha, President, University Drama Club, said, “The significance of this literature festival lies in its reflection of a dynamic and thriving university culture. It provides a safe space where our curiosity, questions, and beliefs—often left unspoken out of fear—can be freely expressed and explored.”

Earlier, Prof. Nazia Hasan, President, UDLC addressed the guests joining from different parts of the country and abroad and said, “A student organised litfest in the corporate world is nothing short of a miracle. It is a special day for the club as it connects us to the history of the club. Progress between one litfest to another holds not just days but life, generations and movements”.

The Coordinator, Cultural Education Centre, Prof. Mohammad Naved Khan remarked, “Literature is not only about the stories it's about understanding the society and history, it gives us empathy, allows us to explore to different perspective helping us grow intellectually and emotionally”

Prof. Mohammad Mohibul Haque, Mentor, UDLC took pride in the fact that this is the rare literature festival organised purely by students. “In the age of parliamentary language which is being constructed as truth, in the age of post truth, here you'll find genuine thinkers.” He mentioned how it was a multi-lingual litfest, with students understanding the cultural diversity of the country.

Mohd. Shams Uddoha Khan, Secretary, University Debating and Literary Club, welcomed the guests while Ms. Juveria Rahman, Senior Member delivered the formal vote of thanks.

Following the inaugural session, the first panel of the Festival, titled The Politics of Forgetting: Memory, Justice, and Resistance, featured discussions by Dr. Ananya Vajpeyi, Prof. Raashid Nehal, and Mr. Tariq Hasan. This was followed by a panel discussion on Adapting Books to Screen: The Art of Literary Adaptations, featuring Mr. Danish Iqbal and Prof. Simon North. The final panel of Day 1, 50 Years of UDLC, saw panellists Dr. Areeba Shabbir, Dr. Fauzia Fareedi, and Mr. Mohammad Shams Uddoha Khan.

Day 2 opened with a panel discussion on Oral Histories, Written Stories: Indigenous Narratives from the Northeast, featuring Dr. Achingliu Kamei, Dr. Arnab Jan Deka, and Dr. Siddhartha Chakraborti. This was followed by a session on Myth, Magic, and Modernity: Reinterpreting Folktales across Cultures, featuring Dr. Geetanjali Singh Chanda, Prof. Mushtaq Ahmad Zargar, and Prof. Aysha Munira Rasheed. Another discussion, Hindi Literature and Social Movements: A Tool for Political Change, had Dr. Mridula Garg, Dr. Nasira Sharma, Dr. Shagufta Niyaz, and Prof. Kamalanand Jha on the panel. Further panels included Writing the South Asian Experience: Who Owns the Narrative?, with insights from Mr. Mohammad Zahid, Prof. Sanjeev Kaushal in conversation Ms. Amna Asim, and Ms. Tanya Kainaat, both members of UDLC. The day concluded with a session on Ecopoetry and Environmental Grief: Can Writing Save the Planet?, featuring Dr. Nitoo Das, Dr. Alexander Phillips, and Prof. Sami Rafiq.

The third and final day of the AMU Literature Festival began with a conversation between Prof. Nazia Hasan and Dr. Anuradha Marwah on Her Story, Her Voice: A Discussion on Aunties of Vasant Kunj. This was followed by a panel discussion on Disability, Identity, and the Intersection of Marginalised Voices, featuring Prof. Asma Parveen, Dr. Yogesh Yadav, and Dr. Imrana Khatoon. A special address was then delivered by Mr. Christopher Flakus on Fiction as Radical Empathy. In another panel, The Many Moods of Urdu: Romance, Revolution, and Resistance, Dr. Azra Naqvi and Dr. Ahmad Mujtaba Siddiqui shared their insights. As the festival drew to a close, Dr. Lubna Irfan held a conversation with Mr. Sayied Zaigham Murtuza on Fact, Fiction, and Freedom: Journalism in India at 75. The concluding panel, Beyond Borders: Wildlife Conservation in a Changing World, featured Prof. Nazia Hasan and Prof. Orus Ilyas.

A number of books were also released at the AMU Literature Festival 2025. This includes Dr. Arnab Jan Deka's Blandine and the Elephant, a short story collection, edited by Laurinda Hartt-Fournier, Canada and Half A Century of An Incredible Odyssey, an edited compilation of essays on Dr. Arnab Jan Deka's short stories, poetry, novels and films. Dr. Achingliu Kamei's Roots & Wings: A Book Of Haiku, Senryu And Haibun, Dr. Sanjeev Kaushal's Phool Taaron ke Daakiye Hain and Dr. Mohammad Zahid's Graffiti of Dreams.

The festival concluded with a valedictory session attended by guests, including Prof. Mohammad Wasim Ali, Proctor, Aligarh Muslim University, among others. During this session, LitLetter, the official newsletter of the AMU Literature Festival, was unveiled.

The success of the AMU Literature Festival 2025 was the result of the collective efforts of the Secretary, Mr. Mohammad Shams Uddoha Khan, and the dedicated members of various committees. The committees were as follows: Public Relations – Headed by Ms. Amna Asim Khan and Mr. Mohammad Arib Khan; Hospitality – Headed by Ms. Juveria Rahman and Mr. Amber Subhani; Newsletter – Headed by Ms. Tanya Kainaat and Ms. Zunaira Habib Alvi; Logistics – Headed by Mr. Adnan Rafiq and Mr. Syed Faheem Ahmad; Venue Management – Headed by Mr. Haider Ali and Ms. Anusha Munawwar; Food – Headed by Ms. Maziya Pervez and Mr. Mehtab Naseem; Transportation – Headed by Mr. Khalid Ahmad; Discipline - Headed by Mohd. Rayyan.

=== AMULF-25 Schedule ===
The 2025 festival was held from February 23 to 25 in the university's Kennedy Auditorium.

==== List of speakers ====
February 23	February 24	February 25th
Nazia Hasan	Achingliu Kamei	Anuradha Marwah
M. Mohibul Haque	Arnab Jan Deka	Asma Parveen
Mohammed Naved Khan	Siddhartha Chakraborti	Yogesh Yadav
Simon Andrew North	Geetanjali Singh Chanda	Imrana Khatoon
Geetanjali Singh Chanda	Mushtaq Ahmad Zargar	Christopher Flakus
Irfan Habib	Aysha Munira Rasheed	Azra Naqvi
Naima Khatoon	Kamalanand Jha	Ahmad Mujtaba
Juveira Rahman	Mridula Garg	Syed Zaighem Murtuza
Mohammed Shams Uddoha Khan	Nasera Sharma	Lubna Irfan
Ananya Vajpeyi	Shagufta Niyaz	Orus Ilyas
Tariq Hasan	Mohammad Zahid
Raashid Nehal	Sanjeev Kaushal
Badri Raina	Amna Asim
Areeba Shabbir	Tanya Kainaat
Fauzia Faridi	Nitoo Das
Danish Iqbal	Alexander Phillips
	Sami Rafiq

The AMU Literature Festival 2025 brought together scholars, authors, and literary enthusiasts, building discussions and celebrating the power of literature in shaping discourse and society.

== See also ==
- List of literary festivals in India
- Aligarh Muslim University
- AMU Journal
