= The Great Indian Film and Literature Festival =

- Logo of The Great Indian Film and Literature Festival
- Status: Active
- Genre: Film festival Literary festival
- Frequency: Annually
- Country: India
- Years active: 2015 – present
- Founded: 2012
- Founder: Karan Kukreja; Manoj Kukreja
- Patrons: Ravi Sharma; Amit Khanna; Anurag Batra
- Website: giflif.in

The Great Indian Film and Literature Festival (abbreviated as GIFLIF) is a film and literary festival in India, started in 2012. It is India's first film and literature festival. The festival conducts film screenings, theater presentations, poetry reading, musical concerts and workshops. The Great Indian Film and Literature Festival is supported by the Department of Culture and Department of Tourism, and the Government of Madhya Pradesh.

== History ==
The GIFLIF was founded in 2012 by Karan Kukreja and Manoj Kukreja. It was formerly known as the Gurgaon International Film and Literature Festival. The festival has three successfully running chapters in Gurgaon (2015, 2016), Bhopal (2016, 2017, 2018) and Raipur (2018).

== Editions ==
=== 1st Edition ===
The first edition of GIFLIF was held at DLF CyberHub in Gurgaon, Haryana in December 2015. The festival showcased 1764 films from all around the world. The following authors, film and literary personalities participated in the 1st edition:

- Subhash Ghai
- Gulzar
- Piyush Mishra
- Shabana Azmi
- Pallavi Joshi
- Avirook Sen
- Sudhir Mishra

=== 2nd Edition ===
The second edition of GIFLIF was held in October 2016 at Jehan Numa Palace Hotel in Bhopal, Madhya Pradesh. The following authors, film and literary personalities participated in the 2nd edition:

- Gulzar
- Gopaldas Neeraj
- Prakash Jha
- Sudhir Mishra
- Piyush Mishra
- Kiran Nagarkar

=== 3rd Edition ===
The third edition of GIFLIF was held at DLF Cyber Hub in Gurgaon, Haryana from 2 December 2016 to 4 December 2018 to showcase the vernacular spirit of Indian film and literature. The festival was inaugurated by Padma Vibhushan Adoor Gopalakrishnan and author Ruskin Bond. In this three-day festival, there were a panel discussion on film production, digital media, advertising, publishing, literature, scriptwriting and film screenings. The following film and literary personalities participated in the 3rd edition:

- Adoor Gopalakrishnan
- Subhash Ghai
- Prakash Jha
- Ruskin Bond
- Kiran Nagarkar
- Piyush Mishra
- Rajshekhar
- Rajat Kapoor
- Vinay Pathak
- Juhi Chaturvedi
- Major General G. D. Bakshi
- Anjum Rajabali
- Anurag Batra
- Anand Neelakantan
- Sharat Katariya
- Rajkumar Gupta
- Rahul Roushan
- Arunabh Kumar

=== 4th Edition ===
The 4th edition of GIFLIF was held at Hotel Lake View Ashok in Bhopal, Madhya Pradesh from August 4, 2017 to August 6, 2018. The following authors, film and literary personalities participated in the 4th edition:

- Vinay Pathak
- Rajat Kapoor
- Jayprad Desai
- Ashok Chakradhar
- Rahat Indori
- Ruskin Bond
- Varun Gandhi
- Vijay Tiwari
- Sheela Mishra
- Piyush Mishra
- Javed Akhtar

=== 5th Edition ===
The fifth edition of GIFLIF was held in Raipur, the capital of Chhattisgarh. It was inaugurated by Raman Singh, the Chief Minister of Chhattisgarh on 5 January 2018. Actor Piyush Mishra's band Ballimaran, performed his famous poems like Ik Bagal' and 'Aarambh Hai Prachand'. Piyush Mishra also recited his latest poem titled Tum Meri Jaan Ho Raziya Bee, at the GIFLIF's Raipur chapter. The Amir A Social Spark, a book by Dr. Kirti Sisodia, was also released by CM Raman Singh. The following authors, film and literary personalities participated in the 5th edition:

- Gopaldas Neeraj
- Ruskin Bond
- Raman Singh
- Saurabh Shukla
- Surender Sharma
- Ravinder Singh
- Rahat Indori
- Shakeel Azmi
- Piyush Mishra
- Abhishek Acharya

== Patrons ==
AISECT University, Screenwriters Association, and Whistling Woods International are some of its patrons. The festival is supported by the Department of Culture and the Department of Tourism, Government of Madhya Pradesh.

== See also ==
- Literary festival
- Film festival
- List of literary festivals in India
