= Audrey Truschke =

Historian of late medieval India

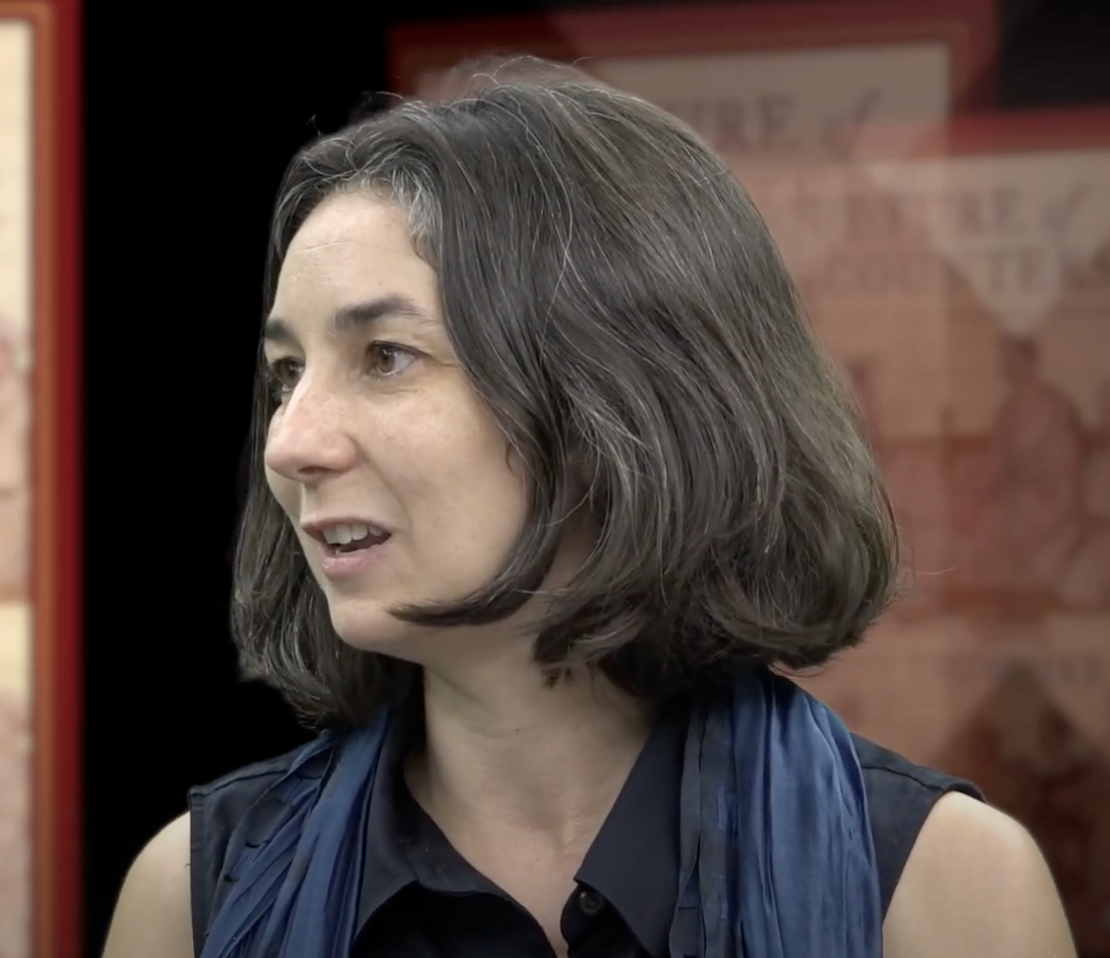
- Truschke in August 2018
- Citizenship: United States
- Occupations: Professor, historian, author

Academic background
- Education: University of Chicago (BA); Columbia University (MA, MPhil, PhD)
- Thesis: Cosmopolitan Encounters: Sanskrit and Persian at the Mughal Court (2012)
- Doctoral advisor: Sheldon Pollock

Academic work
- Institutions: Rutgers University
- Website: audreytruschke.com

Audrey Truschke (/ˈtrʌʃki/ TRUSH-kee) is a historian of South Asia and a professor at Rutgers University. Her work focuses on inter-community relations in medieval South Asia, especially during the Mughal Empire. In 2017, she was conferred with the John F. Richards Prize in South Asian History by American Historical Association. Truschke has been a frequent target of harassment by supporters of Hindutva, who accuse her of having prejudiced views on Hinduism, and making offensive statements; scholars reject the charges.

== Education and career ==
Truschke earned her bachelor's degree in religious studies from the University of Chicago in 2004. She earned her MA from Columbia University in Middle Eastern, South Asian, and African Studies in 2007 before going on to receive a MPhil in the same discipline in 2008. She received her PhD from Columbia University in 2012, and was a postdoctoral fellow at University of Cambridge (2012–2013) and Stanford University (2013–2016).

In 2015, Truschke joined Rutgers University as an assistant professor of South Asian history and in 2023, she was promoted to full professorship.

== Publications and reception ==
=== Monographs ===
==== Culture of Encounters: Sanskrit at the Mughal Court ====
In 2016, Truschke's Culture of Encounters: Sanskrit at the Mughal Court, was published by Columbia University Press. It dwelt upon the literary, social, and political roles of Sanskrit in the Mughal courts from 1560 to 1650, and was reviewed in multiple journals.

Aria Fani, in the journal Iranian Studies, found the work to be an invaluable contribution to South Asian studies. Edmond Smith of the University of Kent, writing for Reviews in History, found the work to be "evocative, [and] expertly researched", where Truschke used her "exceptional linguistic talents" to pose and answer provoking questions about the Mughal Empire while inspiring other scholars to re-examine their approaches to studying religions.

==== Aurangzeb: The Life and Legacy of India's Most Controversial King ====
In 2017, Truschke published Aurangzeb: The Life and Legacy of India's Most Controversial King about the Mughal emperor Aurangzeb, with Stanford University Press. Truschke, in her reading of sources, suggests that Aurangzeb was not the anti-Hindu tyrant he has been made out to be in popular scholarship; there was no "systematic" attack on Hindus and his sporadic destruction of temples or imposition of jizya must be interpreted from within a political and economical milieu.

Truschke opines that the execution of the ninth Sikh Guru Tegh Bahadur in 1675 by Aurangzeb was a political matter rather than a religious act. She writes that Guru Tegh Bahadur was viewed as a rebel causing unrest in the state of Punjab and "a threat to the state security". In response to her alternate take on the killing of the ninth Guru, scholars and the Sikh community including Network of Sikh Organisations, wrote to her "reminding" her that it is "widely acknowledged and documented" that the killing took place against the backdrop of a delegation of Kashmiri Pandits approaching Guru Tegh Bahadur in 1675 to seek his protection from religious persecution.

Munis D. Faruqui, a historian of Mughal India, found the book to be an excellent work aimed at non-specialists, and praised Truschke's willingness to tackle the topic despite being aware about the inevitability of "vicious personal attacks from mostly non-academic critics". However, Faruqui cautioned that the book "[did] not fill unexplored gaps in the historiography." Sara Mondini, a scholar of Indo-Islamic art and architecture, commended Truschke for having penned a "precise and exhaustive" volume on the subject with due regard to sources; it was far more "rich and complex" than the "stereotypical nationalist" ones prevailing in scholarship, and was "pivotal" to the understanding of Hindu-Muslim encounters in the premodern era.

==== The Language of History: Sanskrit Narratives of Indo-Muslim Rule ====
Truschke's third monograph, The Language of History: Sanskrit Narratives of Indo-Muslim Rule, was published in January 2021 by Columbia University Press. Sheldon Pollock, Romila Thapar, Cynthia Talbot, and Richard M. Eaton provided blurbs for the publication.

=== India: 5,000 Years of History on the Subcontinent ===
Truschke's fourth monograph, India: 5,000 Years of History on the Subcontinent, was published in June 2025 by Princeton University Press.

=== Edited volumes ===
In May 2021, Truschke co-edited "The Ramayana of Hamida Banu Begum, Queen Mother of Mughal India" which was published by Silvana Editoriale and Museum of Islamic Art, Doha.

== Honors ==
In 2017, Truschke was awarded the John F. Richards Prize in South Asian History by the American Historical Association for Culture of Encounters being the "most distinguished work of scholarship on South Asian history, [published in 2016]". She received the Rutgers Board of Trustees Research Fellowship for Scholarly Excellence in 2020.

== Social media activity ==
=== Translation controversy ===
In one of her tweets in 2018, Truschke, referring to an episode in the Ramayana, said that Sita had admonished Rama as a "misogynist pig"; she cited a critical translation of the Valmiki Ramayana by Robert P. Goldman in support. Goldman however denied that he ever used such language and deemed her choice of words to be "highly inappropriate" and "extremely disturbing", accusing her of "superimposing her own feelings on the poetry of the Adikavi", while further attaching a copy of his published translation as proof. Truschke responded by stating that such disagreements are routine aspects of scholarly discourse and she had only offered a "loose translation" using contemporary language. According to Truschke, Goldman himself had used words like "pimp" in describing Sita's criticism of Rama and further, she was not endorsing Sita's criticism.

Srinivas Reddy, a professor of religious studies at Brown University, found Truschke's choice of words to lie in the extreme and missing contextual nuances; however, he supported her right to critically interpret epic characters and found subsequent attacks on her by the Hindu right to be misogynistic in essence, and deplorable. Highlighting how the Ramayana was not a dead text but a way of life in India, he urged Truschke to adopt a less polarizing voice in her analyses and respect the text, if not revere. Bibek Debroy, prolific translator of Hindu scripture, derided her translation as an error on par with hypothetically replacing an instance the word "know" in the Bible with the f-word. Sanskrit scholars Nityanand Misra and Shankar Rajaraman wrote a "clinical demolition" of her claims and invited her to a Sanskrit debate over her claims. Writer Purushottam Agrawal found the tweet to be inflammatory, disrespectful and poor; it reduced the layered and complex character of Rama to a "caricature in a contemporary American comic strip," noting that "'Prakrita' [is] a common word, which essentially means 'ordinary' or 'uncivilised', or 'raw' as opposed to refined." Cultural critic Pushpesh Pant found the translation to be poor, as well.

== Targeting by the Hindu right ==
Truschke has been a prominent critic of Hindutva and its exclusionary ideology. Due to her historical works and her choice of language, she has become a target of the Hindu right and has been a frequent recipient of hate mail. In 2021, Truschke, along with a group of other scholars, formed a collective to combat increasing harassment of South Asian scholars by people affiliated with Hindutva. They launched the "Hindutva Harassment Field Manual," offering resources against the Hindu right's assault.

Truschke reports that she is frequently the target of antisemitic attacks, although she is "not Jewish".

=== Aurangzeb ===
After publishing her monograph on Aurangzeb, Truschke was accused of allegedly whitewashing the figure and was trolled by the Hindu right. Wendy Doniger noted these to be ad-hominem attacks infused with Islamophobia and misogyny.

=== Student petition ===
In 2021, a group of Hindu students at Rutgers University circulated a petition calling for the university to disallow Truschke from teaching a course on Hinduism, condemn her views, and create "a safe space for diaspora Hindus". The petition alleged that Truschke held "inherently prejudiced views" on Hinduism and the Hindus. Among the suggested reasons were Truschke's claiming that the Bhagavad Gita rationalizes mass slaughter, (Note: This refers to an article Truschke wrote for Aeon in 2020, where she referred to the Kurukshetra War as a "mass slaughter" due to the extreme detail with which the text describes the horrors of war, the unethical means the Pandavas use to slay Kaurava generals, and the massacre committed by the Kaurava general Ashwatthama at the end of the war; she makes this remark based on the Gita's elucidation of a theory of just war around this specific war. The philosophy of violence (and nonviolence), as espoused in Bhagavadgita and their appropriation into sociopolitical discourse has attracted significant scholarship. See Palshikar, Sanjay. "Evil and the Philosophy of Retribution: Modern Commentaries on the Bhagavad-Gītā". UK: Routledge (2014)) linking Hindus with the January 6 United States Capitol attack, (Note: Truschke linked "Hindu Right folks" with the Capitol riots, not Hindus in general: I begin teaching History of South Asia II (Mughals to Modi) on Jan 19, one day before the inauguration. One of my opening images will be this [rioters and flags in front of the Capitol, including an Indian flag] from DC yesterday, with the opening question -- What do we need to know to explain why there is an Indian flag here?" [In a reply]: There were a number of Hindu Right folks there, including some who have attacked me in the past. — The man who waved the Indian flag has been found as having been an immigrant from Kochi who lived in the United States for 28 years, with "no real close relationship for that matter with any politician in India", and joined the Republican Party out of opposition to Obama's healthcare policies rather than diaspora politics. Despite this, other scholars have noted the enmeshing of Hindu Nationalist diaspora with the US-based far right.) whitewashing the "trauma" inflicted on Hindus by Aurangzeb, (Note: Referring to the conclusions of Truschke (2017), Aurangzeb: The Life and Legacy of India's Most Controversial King) and designing an undergraduate course to portray an "exotic-erotic-chauvinist-oppressive" view of Hindu India by relying on scholars like Wendy Doniger and focusing on the multiplicity of Ramayana among other errors of omission and commission.

The university, while defending academic freedom and calling for an immediate end to hate speech directed at her, said that it was initiating a dialogue with the Hindu community to understand their concerns. Days later, Rutgers faculty members from varied faith backgrounds (including Hinduism) drafted an open letter affirming faith in Truschke's scholarship, rejecting the leveled charges of religious bigotry, and praising Rutgers for affirming academic liberty whilst upholding their commitment to diversity. Among the signatories who expressed solidarity with those academics were Romila Thapar, Rajmohan Gandhi, Sheldon Pollock, Partha Chatterjee, and Suketu Mehta.

=== Litigation ===
In May 2021, the Hindu American Foundation, a Hindutva organization affiliated with the Sangh Parivar, filed a libel suit against Truschke and representatives of several other organizations in the United States District Court for the District of Columbia. Truschke was represented by Cornell Law School's First Amendment Clinic and Davis Wright Tremaine. A year and a half later, Judge Amit Mehta dismissed the suit since HAF not only failed to establish any cause of action — even assuming that their allegations were factually accurate (Note: Judge Mehta rejected that HAF had provided any evidence to support that the defenders were acting with malice, which is integral to maintainability of a defamation suit.) — but also failed to evidence that the court had any personal jurisdiction over the defendants. (Note: HAF requested for a discovery to bolster its jurisdictional claims; Judge Mehta denied the request for being a "fishing expedition, [..] not made in good faith.")

A diverse group of intellectuals and academics—Akeel Bilgrami, Amitav Ghosh, Anita Desai, Cornel West, Martha Nussbaum, Nandini Sundar, Noam Chomsky, Romila Thapar, Sudipta Kaviraj, Sheldon Pollock, and Wendy Doniger among others—have condemned HAF's tactics as a strategic lawsuit against public participation to silence critics and push forward Hindutva.

== Personal life ==
Truschke has three children.
