= JKC =

JKC may refer to:

- Japan Kennel Club, the primary registry body for purebred dog pedigrees in Japan
- Jagarlamudi Kuppuswamy Chowdary College (abbreviated to JKC College), an educational institution in Andhra Pradesh, India
- Jagadguru Kripalu Chikitsalaya, a hospital group in India, part of Jagadguru Kripalu Parishat
- Jack Kent Cooke (1912–1997), Canadian entrepreneur and sports team owner
  - Jack Kent Cooke Stadium, later renamed FedExField, a sports stadium in Maryland
