= AMU Journal =

Indian news magazine

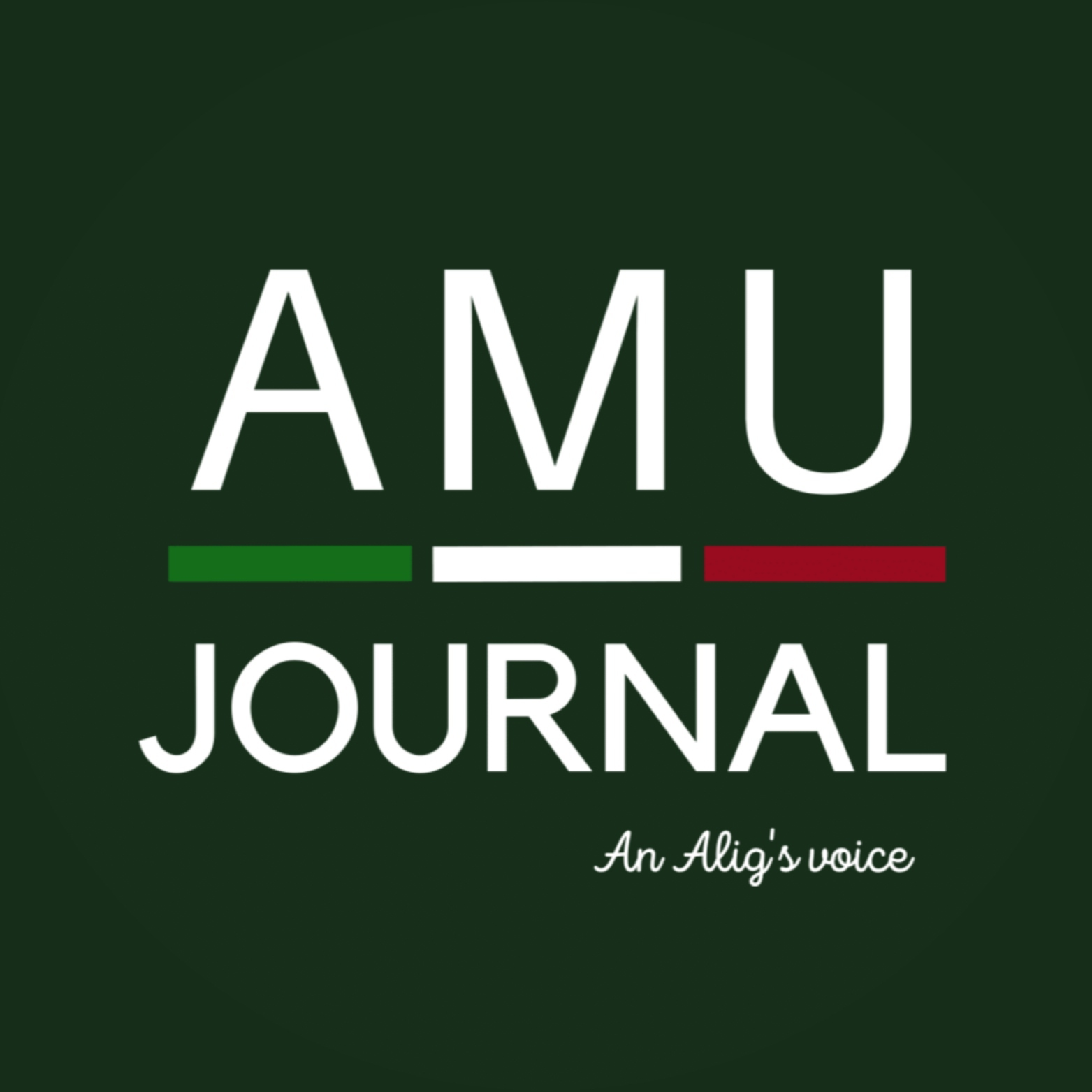

- AMU Journal Newsletter (Volume - 1 , 17 October 2023)
- Editor-in-chief: Hashim Azmi (August 2016- October 2026)
- Categories: News Magazine
- Founder: Hashim Azmi
- Founded: 2016
- Country: India
- Based in: Aligarh
- Language: English, Hindi, Urdu
- Website: amujournal.com

AMU Journal is an independent student and alumni-run educational community and media organisation for Aligarh Muslim University. It was founded in 2016 by Hashim Azmi to raise campus issues and to provide news and information about events at the university.

== Website Launch ==
On 17 October 2021, the Proctor and Public relations officer re-launched the AMU Journal website. While launching the website, AMU Proctor prof Mohd Wasim Ali said the AMU Journal would be used to counter misinformation about AMU. AMU has long been a target of fake news propaganda, such as the claim that AMU students are forced to fast during Ramadan. In reality, the university's mess remained closed in the afternoon during Ramadan due to low demand for lunch. However, the allegation that this was done to force non-Muslims to fast was a misleading post-truth narrative.

== Newsletter ==
The AMU Journal launched a Monthly Newsletter in Streachy Hall on the occasion of the 206th birth anniversary of Sir Syed Ahmad Khan on 17 October 2023.

== See also ==
- Fake news in India
- AMU Literary Festival
- Aligarh Muslim University
