= Guntur International Poetry Festival =

Indian potery festival

Guntur International Poetry Festival గుంటూరు అంతర్జాతీయ కవితోత్సవం
- Status: Active
- Genre: Literary festival
- Frequency: Annually
- Venue: Jagarlamudi Kuppuswamy Chowdary College
- Location: Guntur, Andhra Pradesh
- Country: India
- Years active: 18
- Inaugurated: 2008
- Founders: Gopichand Paruchuri; Nagasuseela Panchumarthi
- Most recent: 7 July 2020
- Previous event: 19–20 September 2019
- Next event: November 2021
- Website: www.gipf.club

The Guntur International Poetry Festival (Telugu: గుంటూరు అంతర్జాతీయ కవితోత్సవం), also known as GIPF, is a literary festival which takes place annually in the Indian city Guntur, Andhra Pradesh. Gopichand Paruchuri and Nagasuseela Panchumarthi are the founders and organisers of the festival.

== History ==
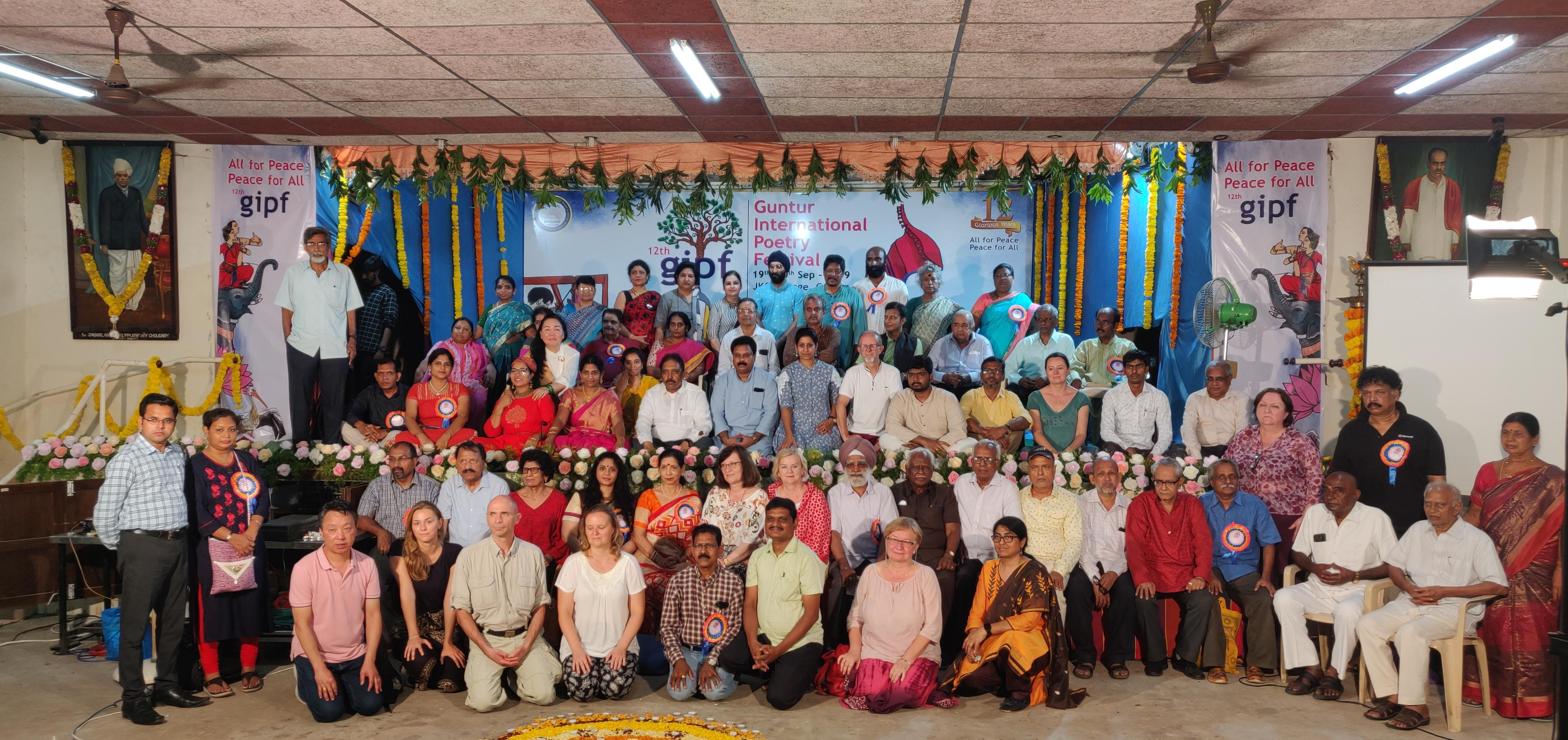
12th Guntur International Poetry Festival (GIPF)

GIPF is an annual non-profit, zero registration fee, invitation only poetry recitation event conducted to encourage budding and enthusiastic poets from India and abroad since 2008 by Poets and Lecturers Gopichand Paruchuri & Nagasuseela Panchumarthi. Invitation to recite poem in the event is inaugurated every year according to the programme calendar released around the month of March. After scrutiny of the entries by the panel, shortlisted poets are invited for the Festival to present the poems to the fest audience. GIPF usually falls on (or) around the International Day of Peace i.e. on 21 September, as themes of poems are predominantly in the backdrop of Peace, Human Values & Non-Violence. Poets recite poems which were selected by the jury in the day session which would later be published in Fest Anthology. Later in the evening Poets recite poems in their Vernacular Languages under the candle lit lights as a mark of solidarity to the victims of Violence in all forms. Last Poetry Festival was held on September 20 and 21, 2019 attended by poets from the United Kingdom, Poland, India, Maldives, the United States, Philippines and Bhutan.

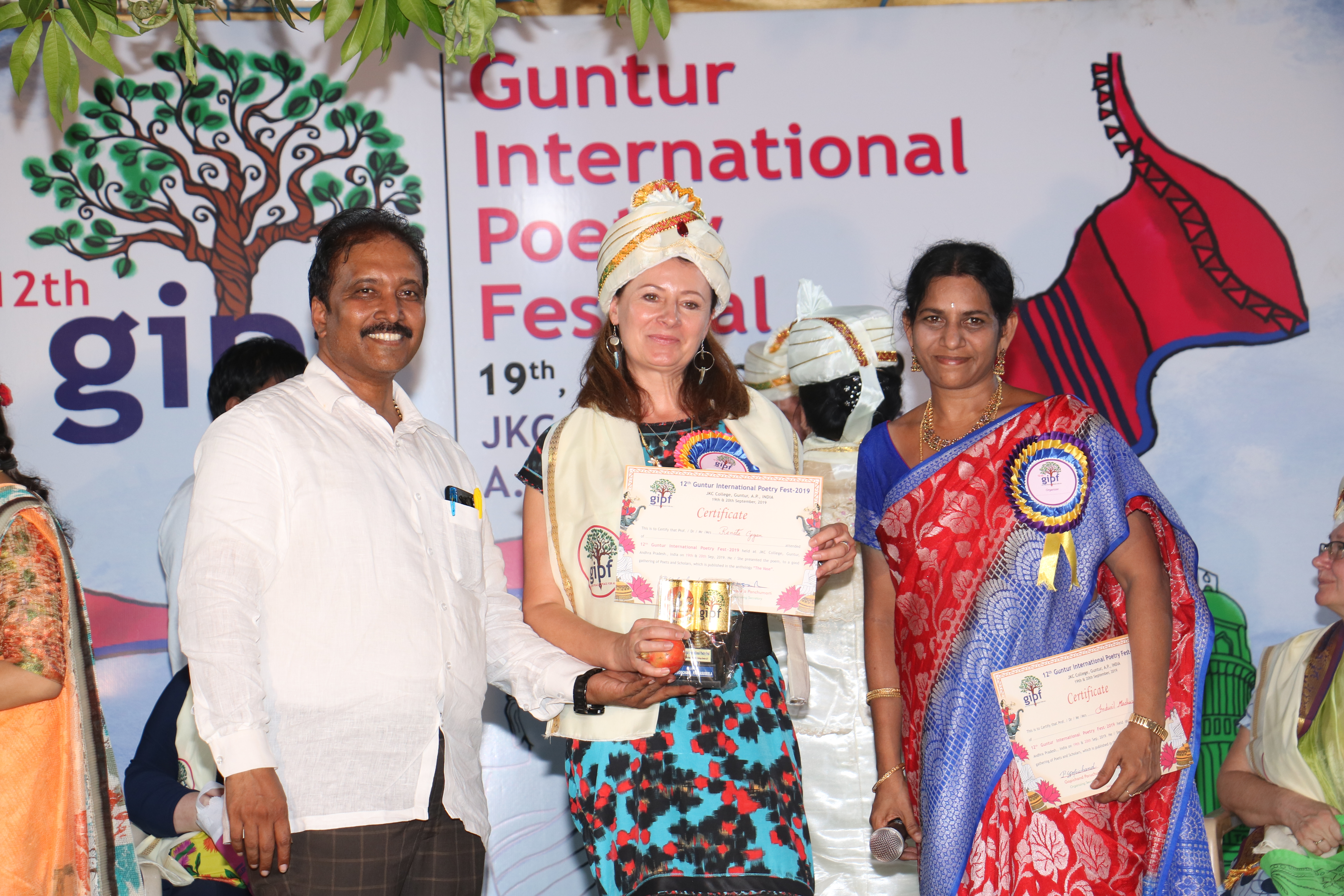
Felicitating poet Renata Cygan

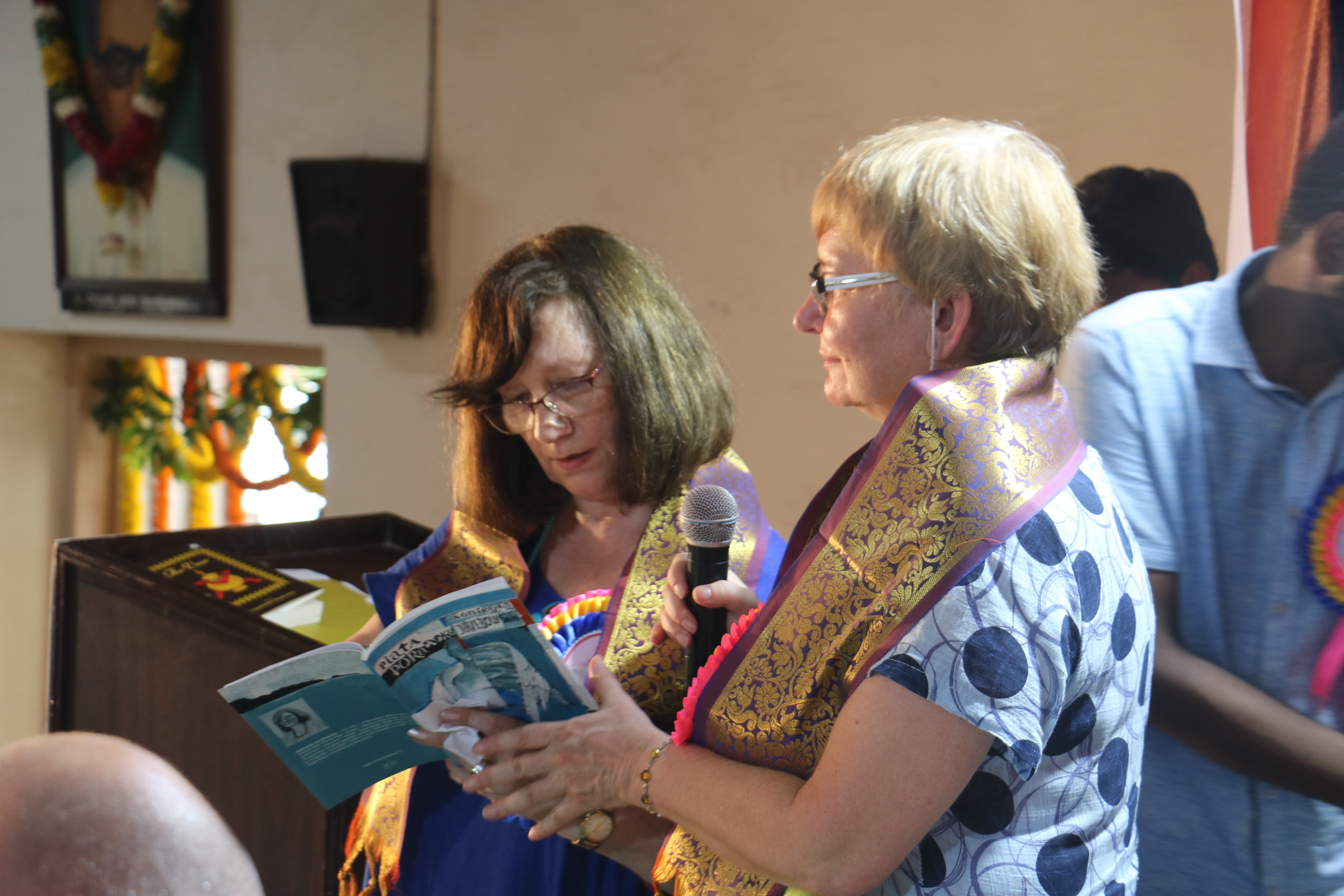
Poets Agnieszka Jarzębowska and Alicja Maria Kuberska

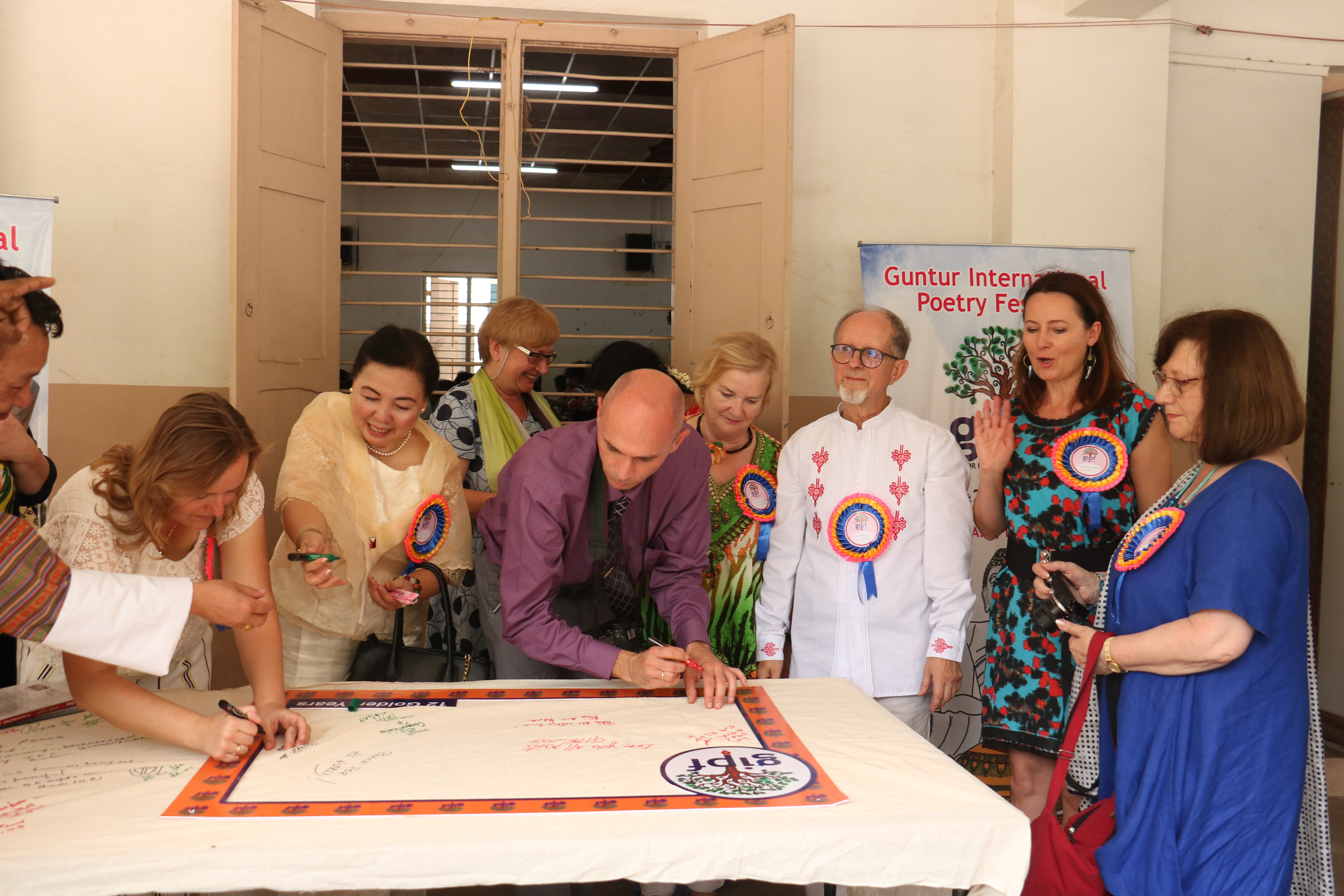
Poets Signing a Peace cloth at 12th GIPF

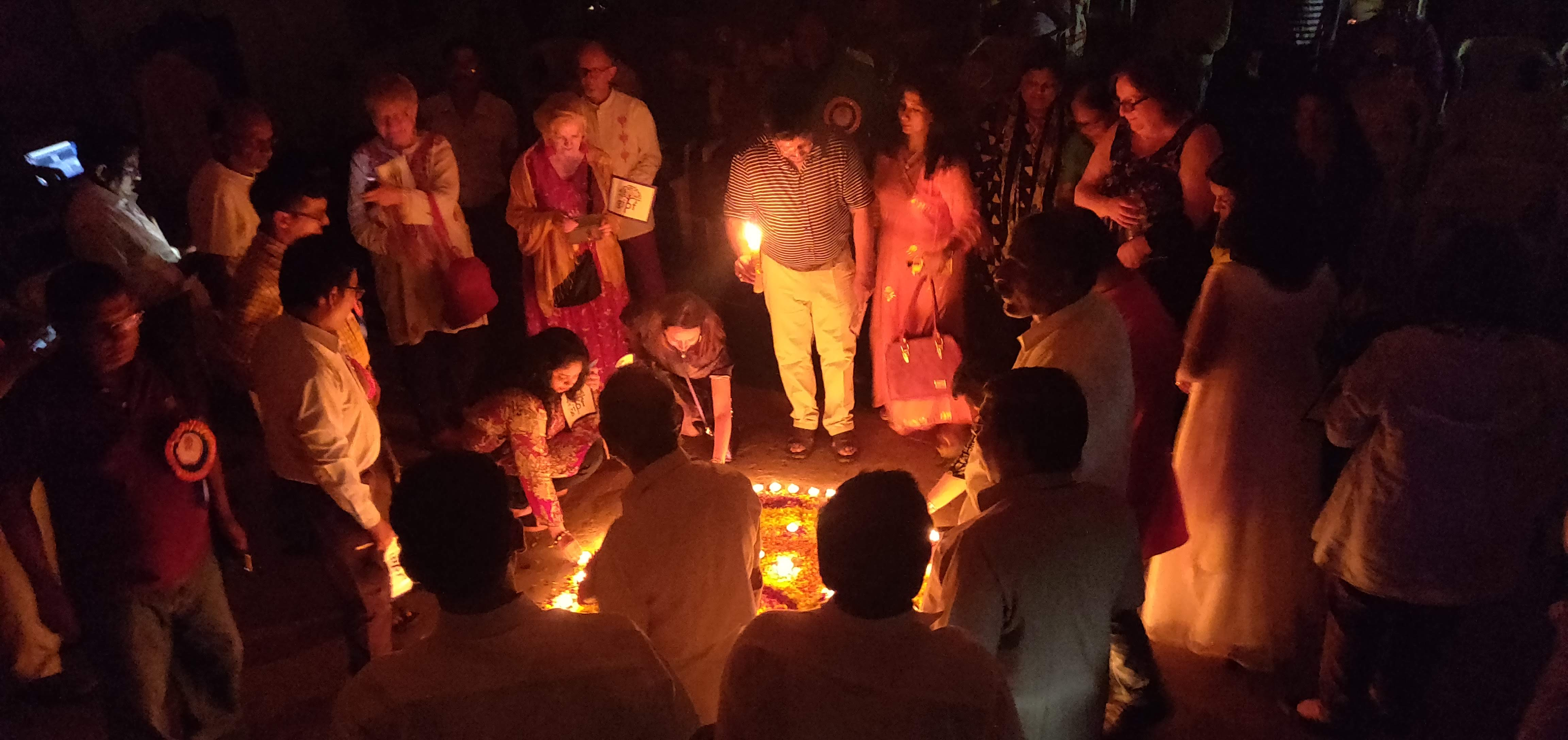
Lamp Lighting ceremony at Guntur International Poetry Festival (GIPF)

=== Notable participants in 12th GIPF 2019 ===
The following notable poets and literary personalities participated in the 2019 Guntur International Poetry Festival.

- Renata Cygan
- Agnieszka Jarzębowska
- Ryszard Grajek
- Anna Czachorowska
- Izabela Zubko
- Sagar Kataria
- Bozena Helena Mazur Nowak
- Dr. Lanka Siva Rama Prasad
- Alicja Kuberska
- Eden S. Trinidad
- K. V. Dominic
- Pramila Khadun
- Nehabhandarkar

== 2020 edition of GIPF ==
In 2020 Due to COVID situation 13th edition of GIPF was conducted virtually on 7–12 July 2020 in which more than 200 poets recited poems dedicated to COVID frontline workers and victims of COVID.

== See also ==
- Literary festival
- List of literary festivals in India
