= Wayanad Literature Festival =

Literature Festival in India

Wayanad Literature Festival (WLF) is an Indian literary festival. It is organized every alternate December at Dwaraka village of Manathavady taluk in the Wayanad district, Kerala since 2022. It is conducted by the Wayanad Literary Foundation. The festival is directed by Vinod Jose and curated by Dr Joseph K Job, VH Nishad and Leena Gita Reghunath. Two editions of this festivals have been completed till December 2024. WLF, according to The New York Times and many media houses, is regarded India's largest rurally held literature festival. The recurring theme of the festival is Resilience, Expression, and Representation. The logo of the festival captures the ubiquitous wetland bird crane flying with a book on its long bill. The iconic Thamarassery mountain pass to the Western Ghats takes the shape of the bird's neck and body.

== Editions ==
=== 2022 ===
The first edition in 2022 was inaugurated by Pinarayi Vijayan, Chief Minister of Kerala with Rahul Gandhi, Member of Lok Sabha from Wayanad. In the 2022 edition, over 100 authors were part of the festival, including Arundhati Roy, K. Satchidanandan, KR Meera, and many others, which saw a footfall of over 40,000 people.

=== 2024 ===
The second edition in 2024 was inaugurated by Siddaramaiah, the chief minister of Karnataka. Over 400 writers spoke at the festival and over one lakh ten thousand people were estimated to have attended the festival. Speakers included Arundhati Roy, Parvathy Thiruvoth, Amitava Kumar, Christophe Jaffrelot, John Kaey, Santhosh George Kulangara, Basil Joseph. The audience included a large number of who is who of northern Kerala and the visiting population of tourists from Bangalore, Hyderabad, Mysore, Chennai, Delhi and Mumbai during that year-end weekend.

=== 2026 ===
On June 25, 2026, festival organizers announced that the third edition is scheduled to take place from December 20 to 23, 2026, in Dwaraka, Mananthavady. Founder and director Vinod K. Jose noted that the rural location, lacking direct airport or railway access, serves as a core defining element intended to highlight community resilience and representation.
