= Cuckold (novel) =

1997 book by Kiran Nagarkar

- First edition
- Author: Kiran Nagarkar
- Language: English
- Published: 1997 (HarperCollins India)
- Publication place: India
- Media type: Print, ebook
- Pages: 609
- ISBN: 9788172232573

Cuckold is a 1997 book by Indian author Kiran Nagarkar and his third novel. It is a historical novel set in the Rajput kingdom of Mewar, India during the 16th century that follows the life of Maharaj Kumar, a fictional character based upon the Mewar prince Bhoj Raj whose wife Mirabai thinks of Krishna as her husband and refuses to accept Bhoj Raj.

== Synopsis ==
The book follows the life of Maharaj Kumar and his attempts to win the affections of his wife Mira while war ravages the land around them.

== Critical reception ==
Cuckold is considered to be one of Nagarkar's most well known novels, and in 2000 he won India's National Academy of Letters Award (Sahitya Akademi Award) for the work. The book has been praised for its "blending of traditional narrative against a historical backdrop presented with relentless detail". Makarand R. Paranjape considered it to be part of a canon of Indian English novels. Gore Vidal called it, "a fascinating book, a sort of fantastic marriage between the Thomas Mann of Royal Highness and the Lady Murasaki."
