= Kaafiya The Poetry Festival =

Kaafiya The Poetry Festival काफ़िया एक काव्य महोत्सव
- Status: Active
- Genre: Literary festival
- Dates: 10–11 October 2015
- Locations: Delhi, India
- Years active: 2015 – present
- Website: http://kaafiya.com

Kaafiya The Poetry Festival is a literary festival held annually in New Delhi, India.

== 2015 Edition ==
=== Participants ===
The following authors and literary personalities participated in the 2015 Kaafiya The Poetry Festival.

- Deepti Naval
- Sukrita Paul Kumar
- Ashok Chakradhar
- Keki Daruwalla
- Arundhati Subramaniam
- Laxmishankar Vajpayee
- Suhail Hashmi
- Sumant Batra
- Dimple Kaur
- Raj Liberhan
- Peggy Mohan
- Rana Safvi
- Aditi Maheshwari
