= Kiran Nagarkar =

Indian writer (1942–2019)

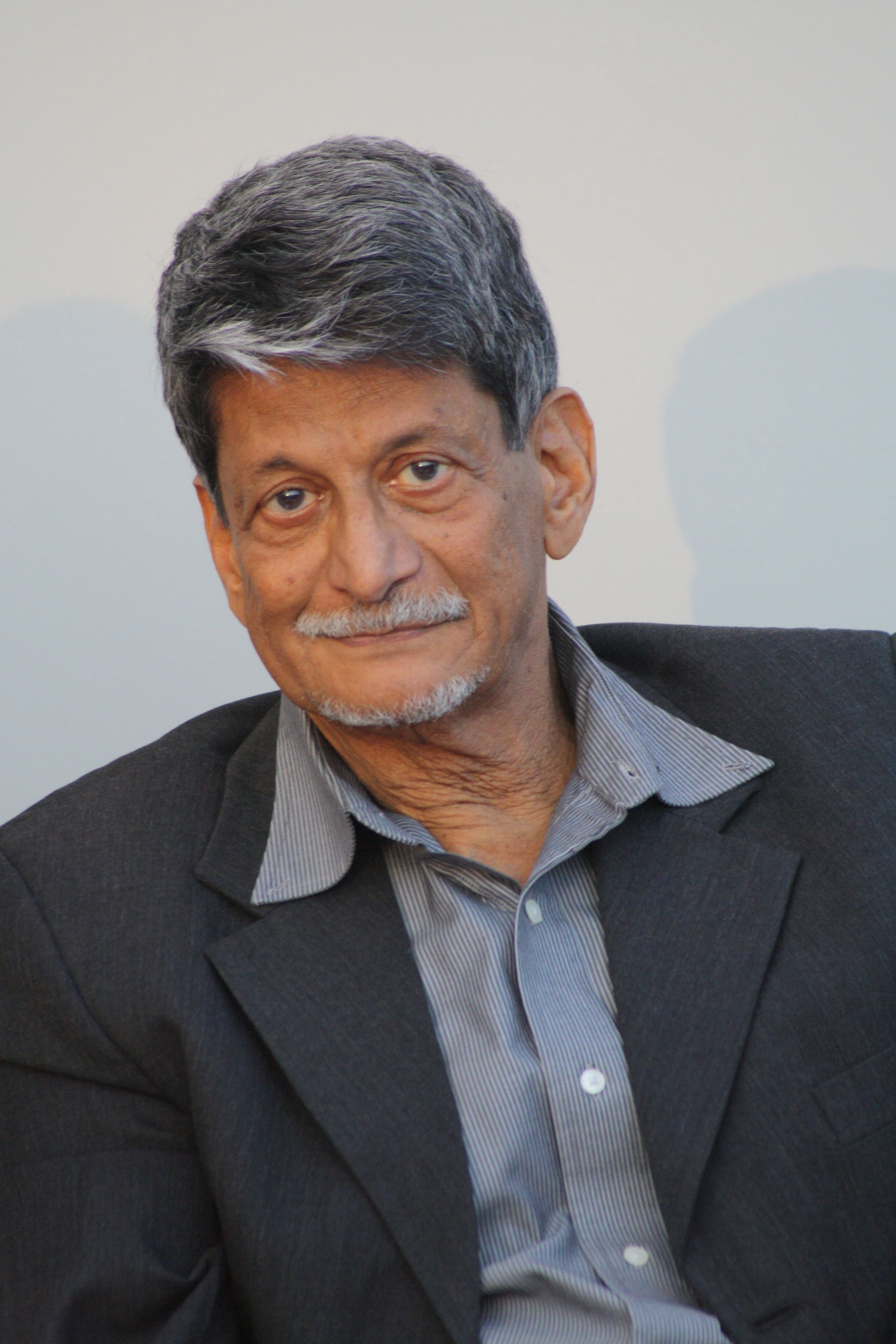
- 2013 – at the bookfair of Leipzig, Germany
- Born: 2 April 1942; Bombay, Bombay Presidency, British India (now Mumbai, Maharashtra, India)
- Died: 5 September 2019 (aged 77); Mumbai, Maharashtra, India
- Occupations: Novelist; dramatist; screenwriter
- Spouse: Tulsi Vatsal
- Writing career
- Notable awards: Sahitya Akademi Award, Order of Merit of Germany
- Movement: Indian
- Website: kirannagarkar.com

Kiran Nagarkar (2 April 1942 – 5 September 2019) was an Indian novelist, playwright and screenwriter. A noted drama and film critic, he was one of the most significant writers of post-colonial India.

Amongst his notable works are Saat Sakkam Trechalis (tr. Seven Sixes Are Forty Three) (1974), Ravan and Eddie (1994), and Cuckold (1997) for which he was awarded the 2001 Sahitya Akademi Award in English by the Sahitya Akademi, India's National Academy of Letters. His novels written in English have been translated into German. In 2012, he was awarded the Order of Merit of the Federal Republic of Germany.

== Personal life ==
Nagarkar was born on 2 April 1942 in Bombay, now Mumbai, in a middle-class Maharashtrian family, the younger of two sons to Sulochana and Kamalkant Nagarkar. His grandfather, B. B. Nagarkar, was a Brahmo and had attended the 1893 Parliament of the World's Religions in Chicago. He studied at Fergusson College in Pune and the S.I.E.S. College in Mumbai. He graduated with a bachelor's degree in 1964 and a master's degree in English literature in 1967. After that, he worked as an advertising copywriter for 15 years.

From June to November 2011 he was 'writer in residence' at the Literaturhaus Zurich and the PWG Foundation in Zurich.

He was married to Tulsi Vatsal, sister of industrialist Anand Mehta. Nagarkar was a life-long critic of the establishment and stood by his political views throughout his literary career.

He was admitted to hospital on 2 September 2019, after suffering a brain haemorrhage at a friend's place during celebrations for the Ganesh Chaturthi festival. He remained in a coma for two days and died on 5 September 2019.

== Novels ==
Nagarkar is notable among Indian writers for having written acclaimed novels in more than one language. His first novel, Saat Sakkam Trechalis published in Marathi in 1974, was translated into English by Shubha Slee in 1980 and published in 1995 as Seven Sixes Are Forty Three. It is considered a landmark work of Marathi literature. His novel Ravan and Eddie, begun in Marathi but completed in English, was not published until 1994. Since Ravan and Eddie, all Nagarkar's novels have been written in English and also translated into German.

His third novel, Cuckold, based upon the mystic Meerabai's husband, Bhoj Raj, was published in 1997 and won the 2001 Sahitya Akademi Award. It took him nine years to write his next, God's Little Soldier, a tale of a liberal Muslim boy's tryst with religious orthodoxy, which was published in 2006, to mixed reviews.

In 2012, he published The Extras, a sequel to Ravan and Eddie that traces the adult lives of Ravan and Eddie in Bollywood. The third and last book in the series, Rest in Peace, was written in 2015.

His 2017 novel, Jasoda, is the story of a young women and mother, trying to raise her children in the arid lands of Kantagiri. Jasoda shows every lamentable tradition in the hinterlands in stark clarity. It is a testimony, according to the author, to the millions of women in the parched and scorched regions of India and find themselves between a rock and a husband.

His 2019 novel, The Arsonist, is a re-imagining of the life of Kabir, the 15th-century Indian mystic poet and saint. It also critiqued the rise of Hindu majoritarianism in India.

== Plays and screenplays ==
In 1978, Nagarkar wrote the play Bedtime Story, based partly on the Mahābhārata. Its performance was extra-legally banned for 17 years by Hindu nationalist fundamentalist parties, including the Shiv Sena, a far-right political party; Rashtriya Swayamsevak Sangh (RSS) and Hindu Mahasabha. He warned about censorship faced by India in his introduction to the play: "Legal censorship in India can often be gauche, club-footed and hyper-protective of anything and everything but the freedoms of speech and expression. Extra-legal censorship in the country, however, is fearless and effective. It successfully prevented Bedtime Story from being performed for seventeen years." In a 2018 interview, Nagarkar did not appear to be concerned about censorship in the country. He recalled past incidents when radical groups in Mumbai had threatened to prevent his play from staging. Nagarkar stated, "these things happen from time to time, and only then can we be assured that art is still living."

Nagarkar's theatre work also includes Kabirache Kay Karayche and Stranger Amongst Us, and his screenplay work includes The Broken Circle, The Widow and Her Friends, and The Elephant on the Mouse, a film for children. He played the role of Brother Bono as a cameo appearance in Dev Benegal's Movie Split Wide Open.

== Awards and honours ==
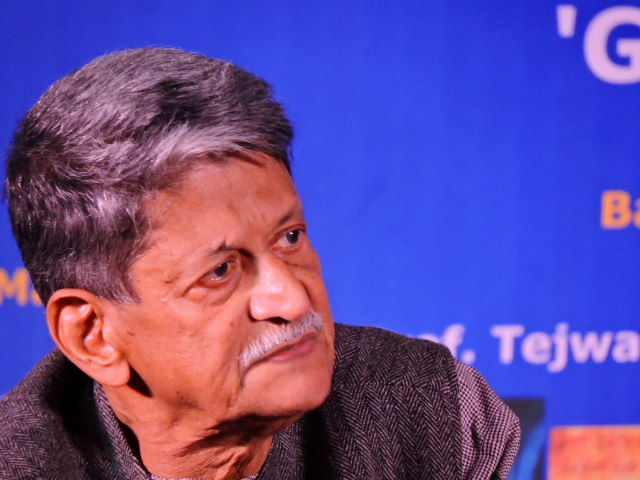
Kiran Nagarkar at the Chandigarh Literature Festival in 2010

Kiran Nagarkar was awarded the Order of Merit of the Federal Republic of Germany and Sahitya Akademi Award among others. He also received the Rockefeller grant and a scholarship from the city of Munich.

- 2001: Sahitya Akademi Award, winner, Cuckold
- 2012: Order of Merit of the Federal Republic of Germany. It is described as the 'highest tribute Germany can pay to individuals'.
- 2013: The Hindu Literary Prize, shortlist, The Extras

== Works ==
Novels

- 1974: Seven Sixes are Forty Three (tr. of Saat Sakkam Trechalis). Translated by Shubha Slee. Pub. Heinemann, 1995. ISBN 0-435-95088-6.
- 1994: Ravan and Eddie
- 1997: Cuckold
- 2006: God's Little Soldier
- 2012: The Extras
- 2015: Rest in Peace
- 2017: Jasoda: A Novel
- 2019: The Arsonist

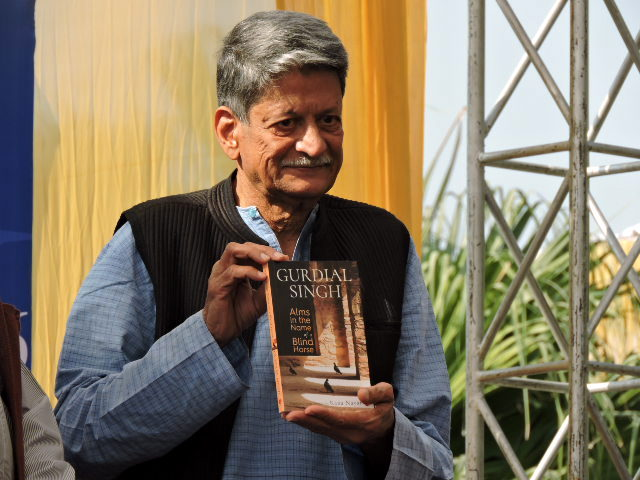
Kiran Nagarkar at Chandigarh Literature Festival in 2016

Plays and screenplays

- 1978: Bedtime Story
- Kabirache Kay Karayche
- Stranger Amongst Us
- The Broken Circle
- The Widow and Her Friends
- The Elephant on the Mouse
- Black Tulip

== See also ==
- List of Indian writers
- Shyam Benegal
- Tapan Kumar Pradhan
- Dia Mirza
