= Aurangzeb: The Man and the Myth =

2017 biography of Aurangzeb

- Author: Audrey Truschke
- Language: English
- Subject: Biography, Mughal Empire
- Published: February 2017 (India), May 2017 (USA)
- Publisher: Penguin Random House India; Stanford University Press (under alternate title)
- Publication place: India / United States
- Pages: 208
- Award: Choice Outstanding Academic Title (2017)
- ISBN: 978-0-14-344271-4 (India); 978-1-5036-0203-8 (USA)

Aurangzeb: The Man and the Myth is a 2017 biography of Mughal emperor Aurangzeb by historian Audrey Truschke. The book was published by Penguin Random House in India and later by Stanford University Press in the United States under the title Aurangzeb: The Life and Legacy of India's Most Controversial King. It aims to deconstruct popular myths about Aurangzeb and place his rule within a nuanced historical framework.

== Overview ==
The book challenges the narrative of Aurangzeb, adhered to by both Hindu nationalists and Muslim fundamentalists within the Indian subcontinent, as a fanatical and intolerant ruler by examining Persian chronicles, royal firmans, and Mughal court histories. Truschke argues that Aurangzeb’s actions were often driven by political pragmatism rather than religious dogma, and that he continued many policies of his predecessors, including temple grants and employing Hindu officials. Among the key issues the book reconsiders are the reimposition of the jizya tax, temple demolitions, and conflicts with other religious communities. Truschke presents these within a broader Mughal imperial context, contending that Aurangzeb’s reign was more about statecraft than ideology. It was named a Choice Outstanding Academic Title in 2017.

== Reception ==
Munis D. Faruqui, a historian of Mughal India, found the book to be an excellent work aimed at non-specialists, and praised Truschke's willingness to tackle the topic despite being aware about the inevitability of "vicious personal attacks from mostly nonacademic critics". However, he noted the work did not fill in any gaps in Mughal historiography. In the introduction of an issue of the Journal of the Royal Asiatic Society, Anne Murphy, a professor of history and Punjabi studies at the University of British Columbia, and Heidi Pauwels, a professor of Asian studies at the University of Washington, noted Truschke's work, along with the works of Jadunath Sarkar, as being part of a long lineage of works which emphasize Persian sources. Within the same issue was an investigation of vernacular accounts of the reign of Aurangzeb; Allison Busch, professor of Hindi literature at Columbia University, noted several contemporary Hindi-language sources accusing Aurangzeb of seeking to destroy what they referred to as "Hindu dharma"; Busch argues this indicates the impossibility of separating political and religious motivations in this period.

=== Academic reviews ===
- Mondini, S. (2018). [Review of Aurangzeb: The Life and Legacy of India’s Most Controversial King, by A. TRUSCHKE]. Bulletin of the School of Oriental and African Studies, University of London, 81(3), 555–557. https://www.jstor.org/stable/26849744.
- Kothiyal, T. (2018). [Review of Aurangzeb: The Life and Legacy of India’s Most Controversial King, by A. Truschke]. The Sixteenth Century Journal, 49(4), 1241–1244. https://www.jstor.org/stable/27038635.
- Faruqui, Munis D. (6 March 2019). "Aurangzeb: The Life and Legacy of India's Most Controversial King. By Audrey Truschke". Journal of the American Academy of Religion. 87 (1): 299–303. doi:10.1093/jaarel/lfy040. ISSN 0002-7189.
- Roy, Muktiprakash (February 2021). "Interrogating the Politics of Historiography: A Critical Reading of Audrey Truschke's Aurangzeb: The Man and the Myth". Journal of the Department of English. 14. Registrar, Vidyasagar University, Midnapore, Paschim Medinipur, West Bengal, India. ISSN 0973-3671.
- Iftikhar, Tahreem; Hassan, Najam Ul (2022). "Re-evaluation of History in Truschke's Aurangzeb: The Man and The Myth, Postmodern Historiography Analysis". Pakistan Languages and Humanities Review. 6 (2): 1127–1136. doi:10.47205/plhr.2022(6-II)95. ISSN 2708-6453.

== See also ==
- Aurangzeb
- Audrey Truschke
- Jadunath Sarkar's History of Aurangzeb
- Religious policy under Aurangzeb
- Guru Tegh Bahadur
