= Jagarlamudi Kuppuswamy Chowdary College =

College in Andhra Pradesh, India

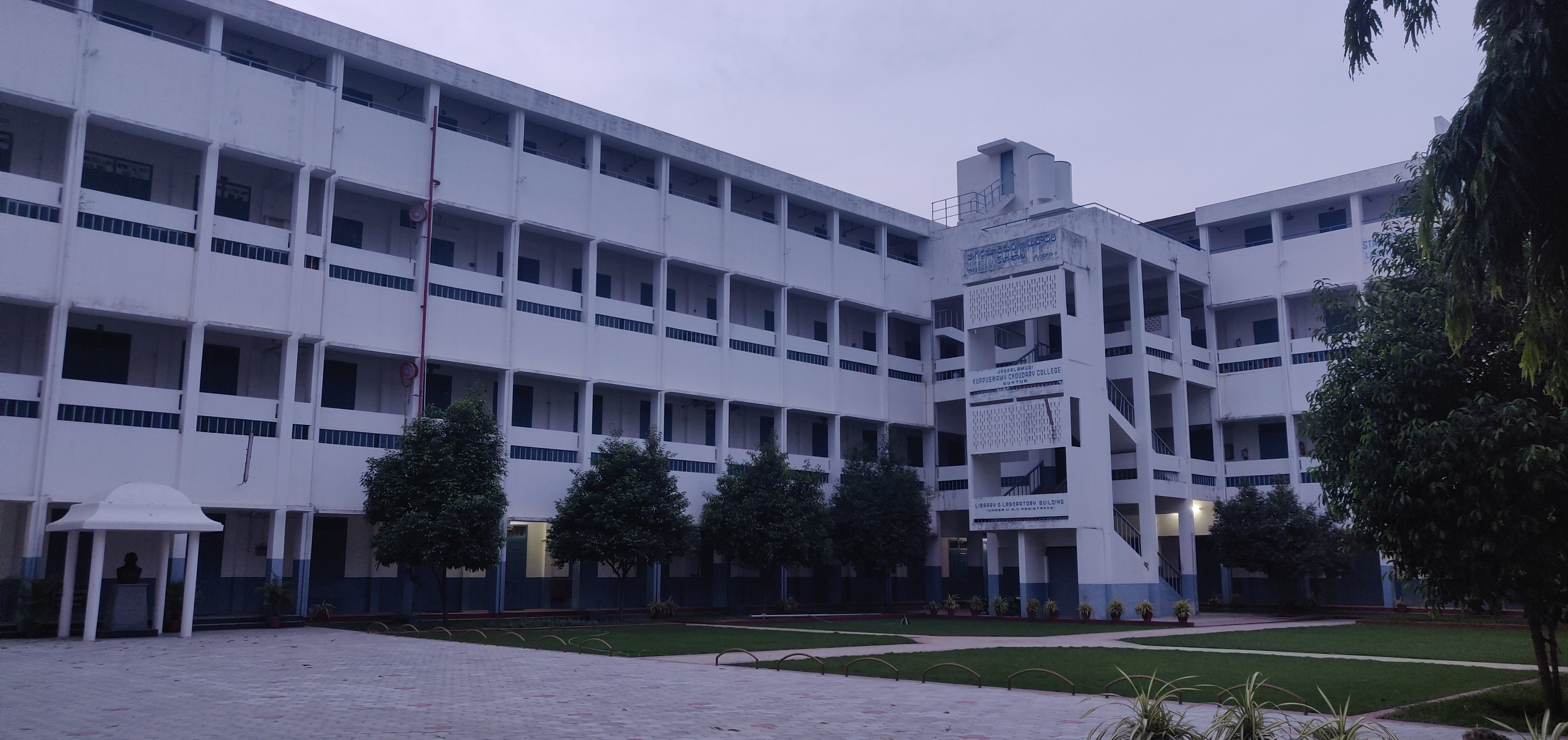
- Type: Autonomous Degree College
- Established: 1968
- Location: Guntur, Andhra Pradesh, India
- Website: www.jkcc.ac.in

Jagarlamudi Kuppuswamy Chowdary College (abbreviated to JKC College) is an educational institution in Guntur of the Indian state of Andhra Pradesh. It was founded and named after Jagarlamudi Kuppuswamy Chowdary, who had served as President Guntur district board. The Guntur International Poetry Festival, or GIPF, is an annual literary festival which takes place in Jagarlamudi Kuppuswamy Chowdary College, usually in September attended by poets around the world. It was founded in the year 2008. Last GIPF was held on 20 and 21 September 2019 which was attended by poets from United Kingdom, Poland, India, Maldives, United States, Philippines and Bhutan.

== Accreditation ==
In 2016 the college has been awarded A grade by the National Assessment and Accreditation Council. The college is also recognised by the University Grants Commission.
