= Maitreyi Pushpa =

Hindi fiction writer

- मैत्रेयी पुष्पा
- Maitreyee Pushpa at own library
- Born: 30 November 1944 (age 81); Aligarh, United Provinces, British India
- Occupation: Novelist
- Writing career
- Period: 20th century
- Genres: Fiction; Indian women's literature
- Notable works: Chaak; Alma Kabutari
- Notable awards: SAARC Literary Award

Maitreyi Pushpa (Hindi: मैत्रेयी पुष्पा; born 30 November 1944), is a Hindi fiction writer. An eminent writer in Hindi, Maitreyi Pushpa has ten novels and seven short story collections to her credit She also writes prolifically for newspapers on current issues concerning women, and adopts a questioning, daring and challenging stance in her writings. She is best known for her Chak, Alma Kabutari, Jhoola Nat and an autobiographical novel Kasturi Kundal Base.

== Early life ==
Maitreyi Pushpa was born in Sikurra village, Aligarh district. She spent her childhood and early years in Khilli, another village in Bundelkhand near Jhansi. She did her post graduation in Hindi at Bundelkhand College, Jhansi.

== Career ==
Maitreyi Pushpa has authored seven collections of short stories and ten novels besides writing regular column in weekly Rashtriya Sahara.

The Delhi government proposed her name for the post of Delhi Commission for Women (DCW) chairperson on 29 January 2014.

=== Writing style ===
One writer refers to her powerful idiomatic language and uninhibited treatment.

== Selected works ==
=== Story Collections ===
- Chinhaar
- Goma hansti hai
- Peyaari ka sapna
- Lalmaniyaan
- Fighter ki Diary
- Samagr kahaniyan ab tak
- 10 Pratinidhi Kahaniyan

=== Novels ===
- Gunaah Begunaah
- Kahi Isuri Phaag
- Triya hath
- Betavaa behti rahi
- Idannammam
- Chaak
- Jhoola Nut
- Alma Kabootri
- Vision
- Aganpaakhi
- Farishtey nikle

=== Autobiographies ===
- Gudiya bheetar gudiya
- Kasturi Kundal base
- Ye safar tha ki mukaam tha

=== Drama ===
- Mandakranta

=== Women discourses ===
- Khuli khidkiyaan
- Suno maalik suno
- Charcha hamara
- Awaaz
- Tabdeel Nigahen

== Filmography ==
=== Telefilm ===
- "Vasumati ki chitthi", based on the story "Faisla"

=== Teleserial ===
- "Manda har yug main"

== Awards and recognition ==
Maitreyi Pushpa receiving the Sudha Smriti Samman on 31 July 2009 by Namvar Singh as Arundhati Roy and Ashok Vajpayee look on

- SAARC Literary Award for outstanding writing (2001)
- Vanmaali Samman (2011)

== See also ==
- List of Indian writers
- Mandakranta Sen
- Tapan Kumar Pradhan
