= Queer Chennai Chronicles =

Indian LGBT literary organization

- குயர் சென்னை க்ரோனிக்கிள்ஸ்
- Nickname: QCC
- Established: 2017; 9 years ago
- Type: LGBT literary organization
- Location: Chennai, India
- Services: Queer LitFest, Chennai; LGBTQIA+ Resources; Writer's and Translator's workshop for aspiring LGBTQIA+ writers and translators
- Founders: Moulee, LJ Violet
- Website: queerchennaichronicles.com

Queer Chennai Chronicles, also known as QCC (Tamil: குயர் சென்னை க்ரோனிக்கிள்ஸ், Queer Chennai Chronicles) is an Indian LGBT literary organization that aims to promote lesbian, gay, bisexual, transgender and queer literature through programs that encourage development of aspiring writers and through annual Queer LitFest, Chennai.

== Background ==
Queer Chennai Chronicles was founded in 2017 by gay activist Moulee and writer LJ Violet. The forum promotes LGBTQIA+ literature through the annual Queer LitFest, Chennai, through books by LGBTQIA+ identified authors, literary events and workshops, and by periodical resource development and publications.

== Queer LitFest, Chennai ==
The Annual Queer LitFest, Chennai takes place in the Indian city Chennai, Tamil Nadu. The first edition of the Chennai Queer LitFest was organised in July 2018. The festival began as the brain child of Chennai-based queer activist Moulee, who thought there was a need for a wider discussion on queer literature in India that would bring queer writers, translators and allies together. Moulee is also the director and curator of the festival. The 2018 QLF was co-curated by writer and translator LJ Violet along with Moulee.

== Publications ==
In 2018 Queer Chennai Chronicles published its first novella by activist and poet Gireesh in partnership with Karuppu Prathikal. The book was released in the 41st Chennai Book Fair.

== Social Justice Pride Flag ==
Social Justice Pride Flag.

In July 2018 the Social Justice Pride Flag was released in Chennai, India in the Chennai Queer LitFest inspired by the other variations of the Pride flag around the world. The flag was designed by Chennai-based gay activist Moulee. The design incorporated elements representing Self-Respect Movement, anti-caste movement and leftist ideology in its design. While retaining the original six stripes of the rainbow flag, the Social Justice Pride Flag incorporates black representing the self-respect movement, blue representing Ambedkarite movement and red representing left values.
