= The Great Indian Literary Festival =

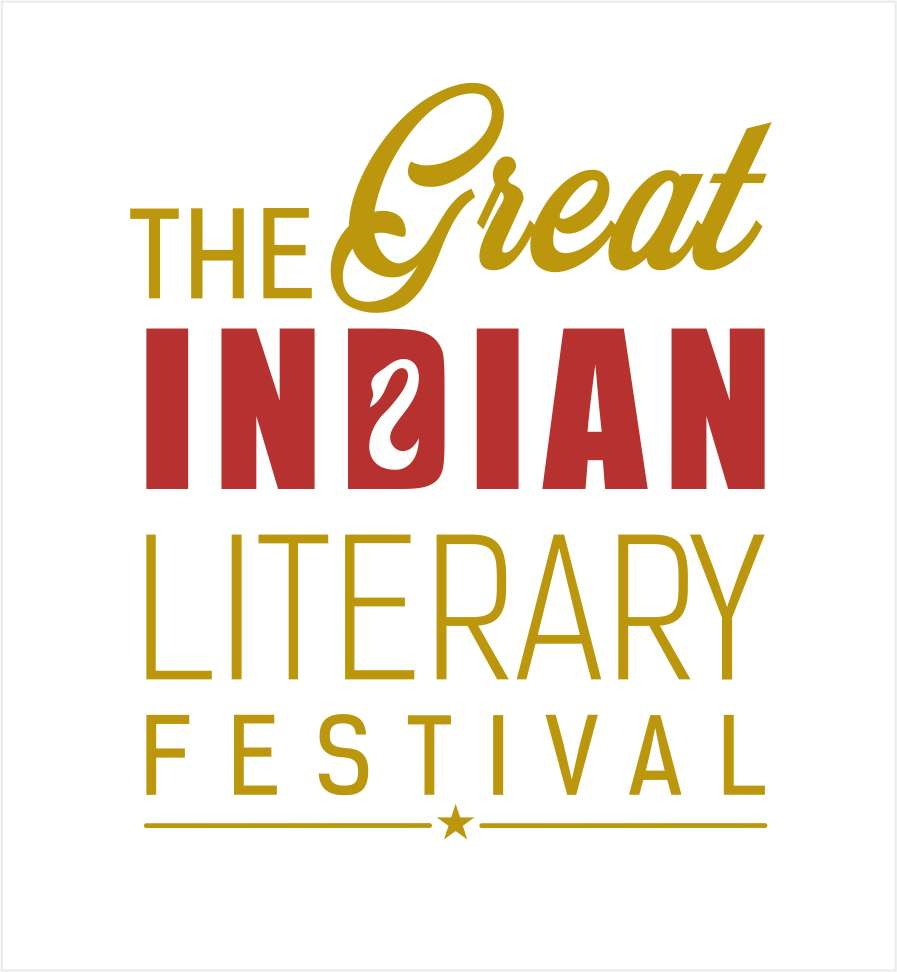
The Great Indian Literary Festival logo

The Great Indian Literary Festival or TGILF is India's only regional literary platform with global footprint.

Founded by famous international author-poet Amit Shankar, TGILF focuses on regional literature and its integration with global writing.

Committed to the cause of promoting native language; both nationally and internationally, it focuses on providing a platform to promote regional writing, poetry, writers and poets. With focus on Hindi, it has been organising various events, discussions to revive Hindi language and literature.

With luminaries as Padma Shri Prof. Dinesh Singh and Shri Sudesh Verma, National Spokesperson, BJP, as Patrons, it strives promoting regional writing and writers as it believes that the soul of a nation resides in its regional expressions. This Literature Festival primarily focusses on the literature from the states of Rajasthan, Uttar Pradesh, Gujarat, Odisha and Bihar and Madhya Pradesh.

It is an annual literary festival that is punctuated by smaller pan-India events, promoting poetry, writing and literature.

Its maiden edition was held in the Indian city of Udaipur in March, 2017.

== The Festival ==
SInce its inception, it has held four large and 6 smaller events.

Its latest session, Season 4 was held in January 2021 which had participation from Romania, Hungary.

It held a global poetry conclave, Love, Light, Life on 14 February 2021. This event had poets from the US, Italy, Romania, Sri Lanka, The Philippines and India.

== See also ==
- Creative Yatra
