= Queer LitFest, Chennai =

Literary festival in Tamil Nadu, India

Queer LitFest, Chennai (QLF)
- Status: Inactive
- Genre: LGBT literature; Literary festival
- Dates: 7 July 2018; 14 September 2019; 19, 20, 26 and 27 September 2020; 18 to 24 September 2021
- Frequency: Annually
- Venue: Kavikko Convention Centre, Virtual
- Location: Chennai
- Country: India
- Years active: 2018 – present
- Inaugurated: 7 July 2018
- Founder: Moulee
- Organizer: Queer Chennai Chronicles
- Sponsor: Crowdfunding, Self-funded
- Website: www.queerlitfest.com

The Queer LitFest, Chennai (QLF), also known as Chennai Queer LitFest, is an annual literary festival which takes place in the Indian city Chennai, Tamil Nadu. The first edition of the Chennai Queer LitFest was organised in July 2018. Kavikko Convention centre serves as the main venue of the festival.

The event is organized by Queer Chennai Chronicles, an independent publishing and literary forum based in Chennai, and is the first Queer LitFest India.

== History ==
The festival was founded by Chennai-based queer activist Moulee, who thought there was a need for a wider discussion on queer literature in India that would bring queer writers, translators and allies together. Moulee is also the director and curator of the festival. The 2018 QLF was co-curated by writer and translator LJ Violet along with Moulee. The Chennai Queer LitFest was started in 2018 to focus on LGBTQIA+ literature in Tamil and other Indian languages, and to highlight queer identified authors, translators and artists. QLF has hosted participants that include writers, translators and artists of Tamil Nadu, and from Delhi, Karnataka, Kerala, Manipur, Mumbai and London. QLF has included themes like Queer identities in India, Inclusive children's literature, Art in Queer literature, translations and Queer literature in publishing. The festival is completely organised through crowdfunding.

=== 2018 ===
The 2018 Chennai Queer LitFest held on 7 July 2018 is the first literary festival in India that completely focused on queer literature, writers and translators. The Social Justice Pride Flag was released in the 2018 QLF. The first edition of the Chennai Queer LitFest's topics of discussion included LGBT representation in Media moderated by writer and translator Gireesh, Queer Literature in publishing; Vasudhendra of Mohanaswamy fame spoke about Queer Literature in Kannada followed by reading from selected queer literature in Tamil. Along the lines of diversity and marginality of queer lives and their invisibilised narratives, The Chinky Homo Project was formally launched in the LitFest. The keynote speech of theatre artist and activist Living Smile Vidya (2018 edition) was read on stage in her absence.

=== 2019 ===
The 2019 Chennai Queer LitFest was held on 14 September 2019. The topics of discussion were on Inclusive Children's Literature by writer Shals Mahajan and educator Salai Selvam. A panel on Art in Queer Literature (Queerness in Art) was moderated by artist Senthil between Community Historian Maari and Illustrator Vai. A conversation on translation was facilitated by writer Nadika with translator V. Geetha. London based writer and artist Hari Rajaledchumy spoke about her personal finding of queer literature and Tamil queer literature in general. Malayalam writer Kishor gave a brief snapshot on queer literature in Malayalam. South Chennai Constituency Member of Parliament and poet Dr Thamizhachi Thangapandian delivered the Keynote. The event concluded with an Open Mic session.

=== 2020 ===
The 2020 Chennai Queer LitFest was announced on 20 June 2020. Due to the ongoing COVID-19 pandemic the Chennai Queer LitFest 2020 was held online through live streaming. The 2020 edition was called Chennai Queer LitFest 2020 Live. The festival took place on the 19, 20, 26 and 27 September 2020. The 2020 edition of the Chennai Queer LitFest focused on storytelling and brought together speakers from around the globe.

=== 2021 ===
The 2021 Chennai Queer LitFest was held between 18 and 24 September 2021. For the second year, due to the COVID-19 pandemic the festival was held virtually as an audio-only literary festival on Twitter Spaces. The LitFest was presided by member of the Tamil Nadu State Development Policy Council and Padma Shri recipient Narthaki Nataraj. The 2021 Queer LitFest focused on the oral history of Tamil speaking trans women led by author A Revathi and writer Thanuja Singam. The 2021 edition also focused on filmmaking, fan-fiction, and creating safe online spaces that drive queer centric conversations. Author and actor Shoba Shakti spoke about queerness in his writings and how Tamil literary spaces has seen queerness over the years. A conversation between Queer LitFest director Moulee and London based writer Hari Rajaledchumy focused on expressing queerness in Tamil and queer terminologies in Tamil. The final session focused on responsible media reporting and the way forward for better representation of queer persons in media.
