= Sumita Misra =

Indian civil servant (born 1967)

Dr Sumita Misra IAS
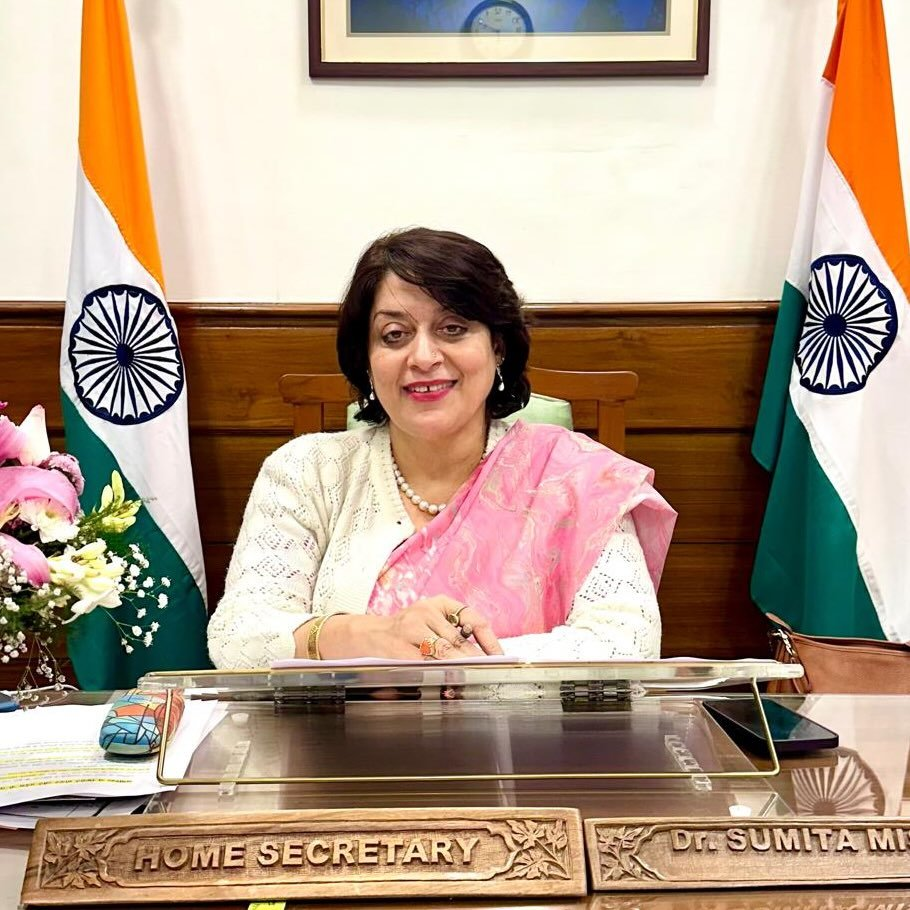
- Dr. Sumita Misra as Home Secretary of Haryana

Home Secretary to the Government of Haryana
- Incumbent
- Assumed office 1 December 2024
- Prime Minister: Narendra Modi
- Chief Minister: Nayab Singh Saini

Additional Chief Secretary to the Govt. Haryana, Medical Education and Research Department
- In office August 2023 – November 2024
- Prime Minister: Narendra Modi
- Chief Minister: Manohar Lal Khattar; Nayab Singh Saini

Additional Chief Secretary to Govt. Haryana, Women and Child Development Department
- In office April 2023 – August 2023
- Prime Minister: Narendra Modi
- Chief Minister: Manohar Lal Khattar

Additional Chief Secretary to Govt. Haryana, Agriculture and Farmers Welfare Department
- In office March 2021 – April 2023

Senior Advisor, Economic Advisory Council to the Prime Minister
- In office 2018–2021

Managing Director, Tourism and Principal Secretary to Govt. Haryana, Tourism Department
- In office 2013–2016

Personal details
- Born: 30 January 1967 (age 59) Lucknow, Uttar Pradesh, India
- Education: BA; MA; PhD
- Alma mater: Lucknow University; Kurukshetra University; Indian Institute of Management Ahmedabad; Harvard University; University of Cambridge
- Occupation: IAS officer

Sumita Misra (born 30 January 1967) is an Indian Administrative Service (IAS) officer of the 1990 batch, currently serving as Home Secretary of Haryana since December 2024. In July 2025, she was appointed the state's nodal officer for the 2007 Census, coordinating efforts across government departments.

As of December 2024, she is serving as an additional Chief Secretary in the departments of home, jails, criminal investigation, and administration of justice under the Government of Haryana.

In May 2025, Misra announced a major update to Haryana's civil defence system. The plan included new volunteer registration drives and mapping of important infrastructure to improve disaster preparedness.

== Early life and education ==
Sumita Misra was born on January 30, 1967, in Lucknow, Uttar Pradesh. She studied at Loreto Convent and La Martiniere College, completing undergraduate degrees in Economics and Mathematics. In 2015, she earned a Ph.D. in Economics from Kurukshetra University.

Misra attended executive programs in public policy and administration at Harvard University, the Indian Institute of Management Ahmedabad, the Royal Institute of Public Administration in London, the Indian Institute of Management Bangalore, and the University of Cambridge.

== Career ==
Misra joined the Indian Administrative Service (IAS) in 1990. She has served in Haryana as Sub-Divisional Magistrate, Deputy Commissioner, Administrator at the Haryana Urban Development Authority and as Additional Chief Secretary to the Government Of Haryana.

From 2018 to 2021, Misra served as Senior Advisor in the Prime Minister's Economic Advisory Council, where she worked on the circular economy and blue economy.

As Director of Renewable Energy, Haryana, she contributed to the implementation of the 2005 Renewable Energy Power Policy, which promoted investment from independent producers totaling approximately ₹5,000 crore.

=== Surajkund International Crafts Mela ===
Misra served as managing director of the Surajkund Mela Authority from 2013 to 2016, overseeing the 28th, 29th, and 30th editions of the Surajkund International Crafts Mela. In 2016, the fair saw participation from 23 countries and attracted approximately 1.5 million visitors.

=== Agriculture and Horticulture ===
As Additional Chief Secretary for Agriculture and Farmers Welfare from 2021 to 2023, Misra supported initiatives in crop diversification (including the "Mera Pani Meri Virasat" scheme), promoted natural farming practices, managed crop residue, and encouraged the adoption of Direct Seeded Rice (DSR). She also contributed to the launch of the Mukhyamantri Bagwani Bima Yojana and the Haryana Beekeeping Policy in 2021–22.

=== Creche policy ===
In 2023, she was involved in the implementation of a childcare policy, making Haryana the first state in India to introduce a formal creche policy, mandating all organizations of a certain size to provide childcare centers for their employees.

=== Chandigarh Literary Society ===
Misra founded the Chandigarh Literary Society and serves as the Festival Director of the annual Chandigarh LitFest (Literati), launched in 2013 at the Lake Club, Sukhna Lake.

== Notable works ==
- A Life of Light - 2012
- Zara Si Dhoop - 2013
- Waqt Ke Ujale Mein - 2016
- Petrichor - 2017
- Lamhou Ki Shabnam - 2022

== Awards ==
Year	Award	Presented by	Description	Ref
2014–15	Best Destination Stewardship Award	WTTCI and HVS	For contributions to sustainable tourism and destination planning.	
2024	Award of Recognition	Chandigarh Sahitya Akademi	For contributions to literature and public service.	
2022	State-Level Flagship Award	Government of Haryana	For leading implementation of the "Meri Fasal Mera Byora" agricultural portal.	
2021–22	Agriculture Leadership Award	Agriculture Today Group	For contributions to the horticulture sector.	
2016–17	Best Book in Hindi Poetry	Chandigarh Sahitya Akademi	For her poetry collection Waqt Ke Ujale Mein.	
