= Zafar Anjum =

Indian author and journalist

- Occupations: Author, journalist

Zafar Anjum is an Indian author and journalist who has written numerous books. He resides in Singapore. He works for Fairfax Business Media's technology publications as the Asia Online editor.

== Novels ==
- Iqbal: The Life of a Poet, Philosopher and Politician (2014)
- Startup Capitals: Discovering the Global Hotspots of Innovation (2014)
- The Singapore Decalogue: Episodes in the life of a foreign talent (2012)
- The Resurgence of Satyam: The Global IT Giant (2012)
- Kafka and Orwell on China: Essays on India and China (2011)
