= Chair Poetry Evenings =

Poetry event in India

- Genre: Literary festival
- Locations: Kolkata, India
- Years active: 2018 – present
- Website: www.chairpoetryevenings.org

Chair Poetry Evenings is an annual poetry festival held in the city of Kolkata by Chair Literary Trust. The first edition of the festival was held in November 2018 with participation from poets from Australia, Slovenia, Ireland, France, Netherlands, Belgium, Macedonia and various parts of India. The festival includes a Poetry on Cruise event across river Ganges on the ending day of the festival.

== Participating poets ==
Some of the participating poets in 2018 were Les Wicks, Subodh Sarkar, Manglesh Dabral, K. Satchidanandan, Rajesh Joshi, Miriam Van hee, Alfred Schaffer and others. The 2018 edition was inaugurated by Sankha Ghosh and Victor Banerjee.

== External links and further reading ==
- Hindustan Samachar
- 16 Poets riding on cruise in the Ganges Navbharat Times
- Making Poetry relevant through a convergence of local and international reflections MSN.COM
- Chair Poetry Evenings Brings French poet Yekta Anandabazar Patrika
- NDTV Bengali
- Poetry can play a key role in today's conflict riddled world believe 'Chair Poetry Evenings' founders by Tirna Chatterjee India Blooms News Service
