= Chandigarh Literati =

Literary festival in Chandigarh, India

- Chandigarh Literati 2013
- Genre: Literary festival
- Dates: 23-24 Nov
- Locations: Chandigarh, India
- Years active: 2013
- Website: http://www.chandigarhliterati.com/

Chandigarh Literati or Chandigarh Literature Festival is a literary festival held in Chandigarh, India. It is organised by the Chandigarh Literary Society with the support of the Chandigarh Administration and Haryana Tourism.

== History ==
According to the chairperson of Sumita Misra, IAS, the Chandigarh Literati was originally conceived in an attempt to promote the literary arts in the city, provide a platform for talented regional writers and thinkers and make available world-class writers to the public. The festival promotes poetry, haiku, vernacular writers as well as fiction and non-fiction writers in English and regional languages like Punjabi, Hindi, etc. "Chandigarh Lit Fest shall showcase the very best in contemporary writing from established and emerging writers, and inspire children as well as all those engaged in creative reading and writing pursuits."

== Festival timeline ==
=== 2013 ===
The 2013 festival was graced by more than thirty authors from different parts of the country, including bestselling authors and celebrities like Bhaskar Ghose, Gul Panag, Ashwin Sanghi, Jerry Pinto, Meghna Pant, V. Sudarshan, Tishaa Khosla, etc. The two-day festival was organised at the Lake View Club on 23-24 November. There were many sessions which included book readings, author discussions and book launches. The festival attracted visitors from all across the country.

=== Participating Authors ===
The following authors participated in the 2013 Chandigarh Literati.

- Kishwar Desai
- Bhaskar Ghose
- Madhu Kishwar
- Gul Panag
- Imtiaz Ali
- Kishalay Bhattacharjee
- Jaideep Bhoosreddy
- Upamanyu Chatterjee
- Angelee Deodhar
- Krishna Shastri Devulapalli
- Pam Handa
- Irshad Kamil
- Manju Kapur
- Tishaa Khosla
- Gen. V.P. Malik
- Govind Mishra
- Rahul Pandita
- Pushpesh Pant
- Meghna Pant
- Jerry Pinto
- Nandita C. Puri
- Manjula Rana
- Ashwin Sanghi
- Navtej Singh Sarna
- Manish Shukla
- Jai Arjun Singh
- Mohyna Srinivasan
- Bubbu Tir
- Ashok Vajpeyi
- Ram Varma
- Chandra Shekhar Verma
- Gyan Prakash Vivek

=== 2014 ===
Literati 2014 was a three day gala affair from 7-9 November with poetry, plays, book launches, panel discussions and much more.

=== 2015 ===
2015 festival was a three day affair from 6-8 November with poetry, plays, sufi music, book launches, panel discussions galore. In this festival following authors and poets participated; Kiran Nagarkar, Nayantara Sahgal, Anusha Yadav, Malavika Karlekar, Naman P. Ahuja, Tishani Doshi, Ashok Vajpeyi, Mridula Koshi, Sandip Roy, Mahesh Rao, Teesta Setalvad, Anupam Srivastava, Jonathan Gill Harris, Madhulika Liddle, Ratna Vira, Nilanjan Mukhopadhyay, Kausar Munir, Munna Dhiman, Jane De Suza, Ravi Subramanian, Ravinder Singh, Vinita Dawra Nangia, Nighat Gandhi, Dhritabrata B. Tato, Sohaila Kapur, Neena Wagh, Payal Dhar, Himanjali Sankar, Devika Rangachari, Tavleen Singh, Leila Seth, Gul Panag, Chandra Shekhar Varma, Prachnad Praveer, Sharad Singh, Madhav Kaushik, Gulzar Sandhu, Bubbu Tir, Sudhir Mishra, Hugh & Colleen Gantzer, Amrita Chatterjee, Puneetinder Kaur Sandhu, Ashoke Mitra, Rishi Vohra, Simran Grewal, Renana Jhabvala, Bahar Dutt, Chandra Trikha, Vandana Shukla.

=== 2016 ===
2016 festival was a two day event held on 26 & 27 November 2016 with poetry, plays, book launches, panel discussions galore.

=== 2017 ===
Literati 2017 was a two day event held on 25 & 26 November 2017 Sukhna Lake Club lawns with poetry, plays, book launches, panel discussions galore. Following authors and poets participated and attended the event; Raskin Bond, Saurabh Sharma, Archna Sahni, Vineet Bajpai, Sheela Reddy, Rakhshanda Jalil, Robin Gupta, Ram Varma, Vandana Shukla, Neel Kamal Puri, Chetna Keer, Atamjeet Singh, Jasbeer Mand, Manmohan Singh, Rujuta Diwekar, Lee Maracle, Columpa C. Bobb, Khushwant Singh, Shantanu Gupta.
