= Rakhshanda Jalil =

Indian writer, critic and literary historian

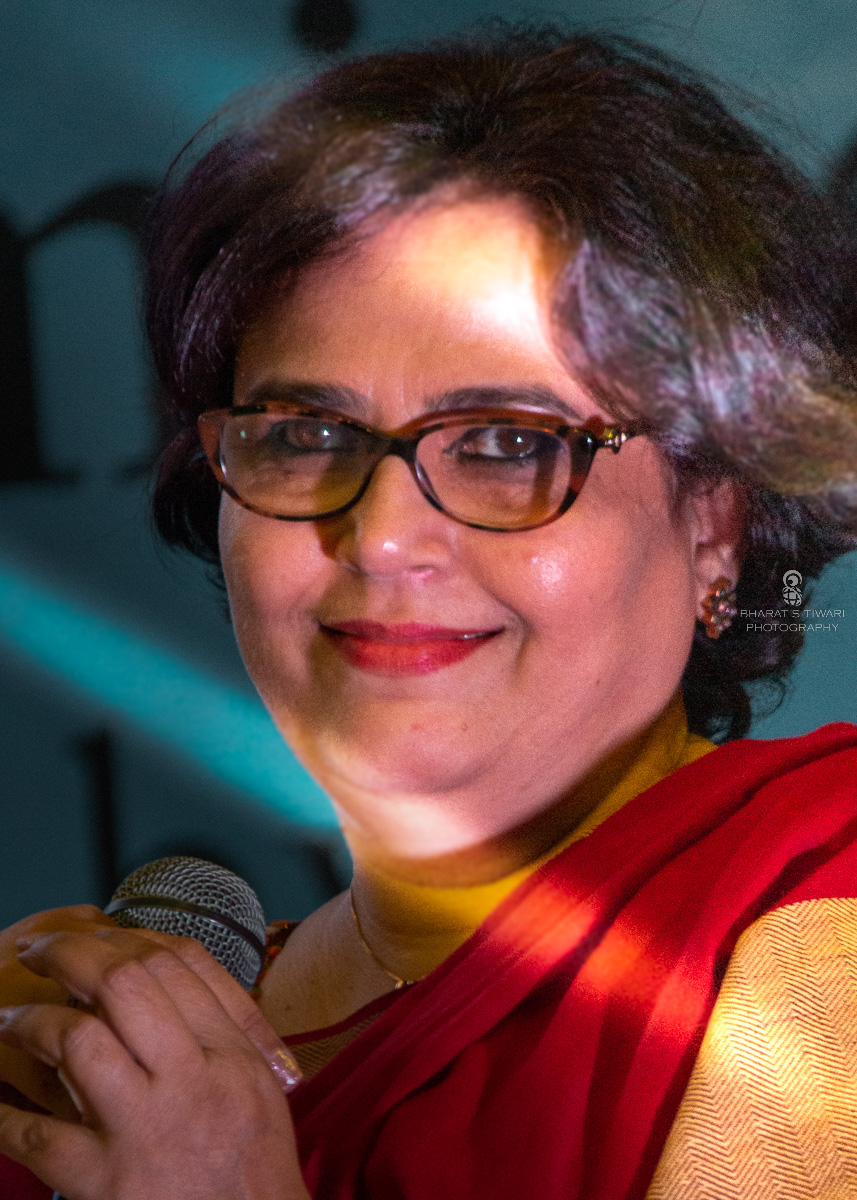
- Rakhshanda Jalil
- Born: 20 July 1963 (age 63); Delhi, India
- Education: Miranda House, Delhi, Delhi University, Jamia Millia Islamia
- Occupations: Indian writer, critic and literary historian

Rakhshanda Jalil (born 20 July 1963) is an Indian writer, translator, critic and literary historian. She is known for her book on Delhi's lesser-known monuments called Invisible City: The hidden Monuments of Delhi and a well-received collection of short stories, called Release & Other Stories (HarperCollins, 2011). Her PhD on the Progressive Writers' Movement as Reflected in Urdu Literature has been published by Oxford University Press as Liking Progress, Loving Change (2014). Jalil runs an organization called Hindustani Awaaz, devoted to the popularization of Hindi-Urdu literature and culture.

== Career ==
Jalil graduated from Miranda house, Delhi University in 1986. She started her career as a lecturer in Khalsa College. After that she worked at Aligarh Muslim University as lecturer (1987), editorial assistant at Tata McGraw-Hill Book Publishing Company (1987–89), sub-editor in the Publications Division of the India International Centre (1989–90), assistant editor in the Publications Division of the India International Center (1990 – March 1995). She later joined Jamia Millia Islamia and worked there as director of the outreach programme. She co-edited a quarterly journal called Third Frame: Literature, Culture and Society, published and distributed by Cambridge University Press from 2007 to 2009. She was senior associate fellow at the Council of Social Development, New Delhi, and associate editor of Social Change, the journal brought out by CSD (Jan 2011-Jan 2012).

== Contribution to Urdu literature ==
She has edited four collections of short stories: Urdu Stories (Srishti, 2002), a selection by Pakistani women writers called Neither Night Nor Day (HarperCollins, 2007), New Urdu Writings: From India & Pakistan (Westland, 2013), and Pigeons of the Domes: Stories of Communalism (Niyogi, 2015); a collection of essays on the little known monuments of Delhi, called Invisible City (Niyogi, 2008, revised third edition 2011); two co-authored books, Partners in Freedom: Jamia Millia Islamia (Niyogi, 2006) and Journey to a Holy Land: A Pilgrim’s Diary (OUP, 2009). She was co-editor of Third Frame, a journal devoted to literature, culture and society brought out by the Cambridge University Press. She has edited and introduced a volume of essays entitled Qurratulain Hyder and the River of Fire: The Meaning, Scope and Significance of her Legacy (Aakar, 2010; and Oxford University Press, Karachi, 2010).
She has published nine works of translations: Premchand's short stories entitled The Temple and the Mosque (HarperCollins, 1992; revised and enlarged 2011); a collection of satirical writing in Hindi by Asghar Wajahat entitled Lies: Half Told (Srishti, 2002); 32 satirical cameos by Saadat Hasan Manto entitled Black Borders (Rupa & Co., 2003); Through the Closed Doorway, nazms by Urdu poet Shahryar (Rupa & Co. 2004); short stories by Intizar Husain entitled Circle and Other Stories (Rupa & Co. 2004; Sang-e-Meel, Lahore, 2012); a collection of Premchand's short stories for children called A Winter's Tale and Other Stories (Puffin, 2007); Naked Voices and other Stories – a collection of stories and sketches by Saadat Hasan Manto translated by her from Urdu (Roli, 2008); Panchlight and Other Stories by Hindi writer Phanishwarnath Renu (Orient Blackswan, 2010); and Traitor, translated from Krishan Chander's Gaddaar, published by Tranquebar in 2017.

The biography of Urdu feminist writer Dr Rashid Jahan by Rakhshanda Jalil has been published by Women Unlimited under the title A Rebel and her Cause (2014). With over 15 books behind her and over 50 academic papers at seminars and conferences, at present she contributes regularly to national and international newspapers and magazines, writes book reviews, opinion pieces and travelogues, and appears on television to talk about issues of culture, literature and society. She also contributes regularly to Himal (Kathmandu), The Herald (Karachi) and The Friday Times (Lahore), apart from The Hindu, Biblio, The Literary Review, etc. in India.

Her debut collection of fiction, Release & Other Stories, was published by HarperCollins in 2011, and received critical acclaim. At present, she is engaged in a study of Indian secularism.

== Bibliography ==
- Invisible City: The Hidden Monument of Delhi
- Lies: Half Told; translated by Rakshanda Jalil; 2002, Srishti Publishers. ISBN 81-87075-92-9.
- A Winter's Night And Other Stories
- Release & Other Stories
- A Rebel and Her Cause: The Life and Work of Rashid Jahan published by Women Unlimited
- Qurratulain Hyder and the River of Fire: The Meaning, Scope and Significance of Her Legacy
- Naked Voices: Stories And Sketches
- Through The Closed Doorway: A Collection Of Nazms
- New Urdu Writings: From India and Pakistan
