= Purushottam Agrawal =

Indian writer and TV presenter

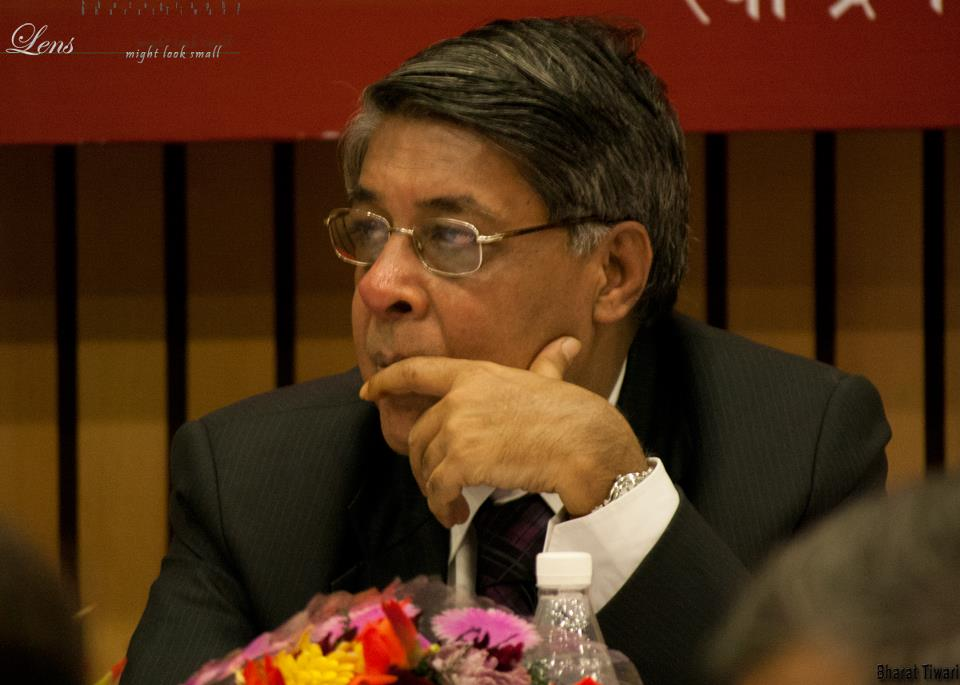
- Agrawal in 2012
- Born: 25 August 1955 (age 71); Gwalior, Madhya Pradesh
- Education: Jawaharlal Nehru University, New Delhi and Jeewaji University Gwalior, Madhya Pradesh
- Occupations: Writer, academic
- Spouse: Suman Keshari
- Children: Ritwik Agrawal (Son) Ritambhara Agrawal (Daughter)
- Writing career
- Language: Hindi and English
- Notable works: Akath Kahani Prem Ki : Kabir Aur Unka Samay (criticism), NaCoHuS (novel)
- Notable awards: Sahitya Akademi Bhasha Samaan, Devishanker Awasthi Samman, Mukutdhar Pandey Samman, Pratham Rajkamal Pandulipi Puraskar
- Website: purushottamagrawal.com

Purushottam Agrawal (born 25 August 1955) is an Indian writer, academician, literary critic, and former member of the Union Public Service Commission board.

== Early life and career ==
Born on 25 August 1955 in the city of Gwalior, Madhya Pradesh, he completed his MA in political science from Jiwaji University (Gwalior) in 1977. Later, he moved to Delhi, for an MA in Hindi literature at Jawaharlal Nehru University, and, in 1985, a PhD focusing on "The Social Meaning of Kabir's Bhakti" supervised by Namvar Singh.

From 2 July 2007 to July 2013, he was a member of the Union Public Service Commission, New Delhi.

He was anchor and interviewer on the television show 'Kitab', telecast on Rajya Sabha TV (now Sansad TV).

== Bibliography ==
- Teesara Rukh
- Shivdan Singh Chauhan
- Sanskriti: Varchsva aur Pratirodh
- Nij Brahma Vichar: Dharma, Samaj aur Dharmetar Adhyatma
- Vichar ka Ananta
- Akath Kahani Prem Ki: Kabir ki Kavita aur Unka Samay
- Hindi Saray: Astrakhan via Yerevan
- Scholaris ki Chhanv Men
- Nacohus
- Kabir, Kabir: The Life and Work of Early Modern Poet-Philosopher
- Kaun Hain Bharat Mata 2021
