= Gorakhpur Literary Fest =

Indian literary festival

- Genre: Literary festival
- Locations: Gorakhpur, India
- Years active: 2017 – present
- Website: www.gorakhpurlitfest.com

Gorakhpur Literary Fest is an annual literary festival held in Gorakhpur, Uttar Pradesh, India.

== History ==
=== 2024 ===
Gorakhpur Literary Fest was organized during 21–22 December 2024.

=== 2021 ===
Gorakhpur Literary Fest was organized during 18–19 December 2021.

=== 2020 ===
Gorakhpur Literary Fest was scheduled for 1–2 February 2020. Venue was St. Andrew Degree College, Gorakhpur.

=== 2018 ===
Gorakhpur Literary Fest was held during 6–7 October 2018.

=== 2017 ===
Gorakhpur Literary Fest was held during 8–9 April 2017. Fest was inaugurated by then President of Sahitya Academy Prof. Vishwanath Prasad Tiwari and writer Chitra Mudgal.
