= Lucknow Literary Festival =

Lucknow Literary Festival लखनऊ साहित्यिक महोत्सव
- Status: Active
- Genre: Literary festival
- Dates: Annually in February/ March
- Locations: Lucknow, Uttar Pradesh, India
- Years active: 2013 – present
- Founder: Shamim A. Aarzoo
- Organiser: Lucknow Society
- Website: http://lucknowliteraryfestival.com/

The Lucknow Literary Festival is an international literary festival held annually in Lucknow, Uttar Pradesh, India since 2013.

The Lucknow Literary Festival is an endeavour of the Lucknow Society, which is a non profit organization.

It is a 3-day event. It is held each year in Lucknow, during the month of February/March.

The Lucknow Literary Festival too confers "Pride of Lucknow" award and "Wajid Ali Shah" award, which are given to people who have been contributing extraordinarily in different spheres of life. These people may belong to various fields like Hindi writing, Urdu writing, Journalism, Social service etc. These eminent personalities belong to Lucknow and even across India respectively.

== Editions ==
1st Edition of Lucknow Literary Festival - 23–24 March 2013

2nd Edition of Lucknow Literary Festival - 1–2 February 2014

3rd Edition of Lucknow Literary Festival - 13–15 February 2015

4th Edition of Lucknow Literary Festival - 19–21 February 2016

5th Edition of Lucknow Literary Festival - 10–12 November 2017

6th Edition of Lucknow Literary Festival - 28–30 December 2018
