= Anu (name) =

Female given name and family name

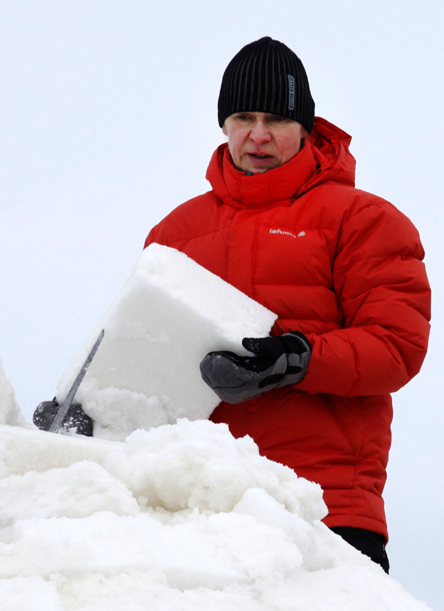
Anu Nõulik

Anu is a given name and surname found independently in several cultures. The Finnish and Estonian name is derived from the Karelian variant of the name Anna, which became popular after Kersti Bergroth's play Anu ja Mikko of 1932. The Sanskrit name is a short form of Anuradha, Anurag, Anubhooti, etc. The Nigerian name which means 'Mercy', is a short form of Anuoluwa, Anuoluwapo, etc. from the Western Yoruba tribe.

== Notable persons ==
=== Given name ===
==== Indian origin ====
- Anu Aga (born 1942), Indian businesswoman and social worker
- Anu Aggarwal (born 1969), former Indian model and actress
- Anu Aiyengar, finance professional
- Anu Choudhury (born 1979), Indian actress
- Anu Elizabeth Jose, Indian Malayalam-language lyricist
- Anu Garg (born 1967), American author and speaker
- Anu Hasan (born 1968), Indian Tamil-language actress and TV anchor
- Anu Lama, Nepalese women's footballer
- Anu Malhotra (born 1961), Indian film-maker
- Anu Malik (born 1960), Indian Hindi-language music director and singer
- Anu Mohan (Malayalam actor), Indian Malayalam-language actor
- Anu Mohan (Tamil actor), Indian actor and film maker
- Anu Muhammad (born 1956), Bangladeshi economist and political activist
- Anu Prabhakar (born 1980), Indian Kannada-language actress
- Anu Ramamoorthy, Malaysian actress and model
- Anu Ramdas (born 1980), interdisciplinary artist living in Denmark
- Anu Singh (born 1972), Australian convicted of the manslaughter of her boyfriend, later became criminologist
- Anu Vaidyanathan (born 1983 or 1984), Indian triathlete

==== Estonian or Finnish origin ====
- Anu Aun (born 1980), Estonian film director, producer and screenwriter
- Anu Kaal (born 1940), Estonian opera singer
- Anu Kaipainen (1933–2009), Finnish writer
- Anu Kaljurand (born 1969), Estonian hurdler
- Anu Kalm (born 1960), Estonian graphic artist and illustrator
- Anu Koivisto (born 1980), Finnish backstroke swimmer
- Anu Korb (born 1950), Estonian folklorist
- Anu Lamp (born 1958), Estonian actress
- Anu Nieminen (born 1977), Finnish badminton player
- Anu Palevaara (born 1971), Finnish actress, choreographer and dancer
- Anu Partanen (born 1975), Finnish journalist and cultural commentator
- Anu Pentik (born 1942), Finnish designer
- Anu Põder (1947–2013), Estonian sculptor
- Anu Realo (born 1971), Estonian psychologist
- Anu Saagim (born 1962), Estonian socialite, editor and journalist
- Anu Saluäär (born 1948), Estonian translator, editor, essayist
- Anu Tali (born 1972), Estonian conductor
- Anu Vehviläinen (born 1963), Finnish former Minister of Transport
- Anu Välba (born 1974), Estonian TV and radio host
- Anu Viheriäranta (born 1982), Finnish ballet dancer
- Anu Wartiovaara (born 1966), Finnish biomedical scientist

==== Other ====
- Anu Solomon (born 1994), American footballer (Hawaiian)
- Queen Anu (died 1696), Mongolian noblewoman and warrior
- Anu Namshir (born 1991), Mongolian miss and model
- Neferkamin Anu, ancient Egyptian pharaoh
- Anu or A Nu, a character in the video game The Legend of Sword and Fairy

=== Surname ===
- Christine Anu (born 1970), Australian pop singer of Torres Strait Islander descent

== See also ==
- Anu (disambiguation)
- Ant (name)
