= Dehradun Literature Festival =

Indian literary festival

- Status: Active
- Genre: Literary festival
- Begins: November 27, 2026
- Ends: November 29, 2026
- Frequency: Annually
- Locations: Dehradun, Uttarakhand, India
- Country: India
- Years active: 2016 – present
- Inaugurated: 2017
- Founder: Samraant Virmani
- Next event: 2027
- Major events: Panel discussions, poetry recitations, book launches, workshops, literary awards, interactive sessions with authors and filmmakers, music performances, and cultural events
- Website: www.dehradunliteraturefestival.com

The Dehradun Literature Festival is an annual literary festival held in Dehradun, Uttarakhand, India, which began in 2017. The festival hosts authors, poets, artists, filmmakers, and scholars who participate in discussions, workshops, and book launches, focusing on literature and cultural dialogue.

== History ==
The festival was established in 2016 by Samraant Virmani to put Dehradun at the forefront of Indian literary scene. The first edition of the Dehradun Literature Festival was organized in 2017.

A new logo for the festival, combining a butterfly and a book to represent the natural and literary heritage of the Doon Valley, was unveiled by Ruskin Bond in August 2023.

== 2017 edition ==
The 2017 edition of the two-day festival commenced at the ONGC Officers Club, Dehradun. The 2017 inaugural curtain raiser of Dehradun Literature Festival Shobhaa De, who launched Karan Johar's book The Unsuitable Boy.

=== Participants ===
The following authors and literary personalities participated in the 2017 Dehradun Literary Festival.

- Shobhaa De
- Laxmi Narayan Tripathi
- Suchitra Krishnamoorthi
- Piyush Mishra
- Kiran Manral
- Rakhshanda Jalil
- Bijaylaxmi Nanda
- Divya Prakash Dubey
- Ashok Chakradhar
- Hridayesh Joshi
- Laxmi Pant
- Sushil Bahuguna
- Trepan Singh Chauhan
- Rajshekhar
- Sumrit Shahi
- Savi Sharma
- Mona Verma

== 2018 edition ==
In January 2018, the curtain raiser of the 2nd season saw the attendance of Bollywood actor Shatrughan Sinha along with the writer of his biography Anything but Khamosh Bharathi Pradhan who is a film critic and a writer.

The festival also hosted an additional Dehradun Literature Festival in the same year, which took place from 9th to 11th August at Unison World School. Notable attendees included Krishan Kant Paul, the Governor of Uttarakhand, spiritual leader Sadhguru, author Ruskin Bond, filmmaker Madhur Bhandarkar, actress Sharmila Tagore, Soha Ali Khan, Lillete Dubey, and actor Mohammed Zeeshan Ayyub.

The 2018 edition of the Dehradun Literature Festival commenced with an inauguration by Governor K.K. Paul. This was followed by a musical session hosted by the Isha Foundation. The festival featured a discussion between Ruskin Bond and Sadhguru in a session titled "Mystic Meets Legend". The theme of the festival was "Khulli Kitaab", which translates to "Open Book". The festival hosted various literary events, such as panel discussions and readings. It concluded with discussions on poetry, prose, publishing, history, cinema, fame, and the influence of Indian literature on music on August 11, 2018.

== 2019 edition ==
The 2019 edition of the Dehradun Literature Festival took place from October 11 to 13 at Doon International School, Riverside Campus, Pondha. Participants included Yashwant Sinha, who discussed his autobiography Relentless, and Union Minister Rajyavardhan Singh Rathore, who emphasized the importance of fitness. Barkha Dutt interviewed Ma Anand Sheela about her relationship with Osho Rajneesh.

Other notable attendees included Mark Tully, Ruskin Bond, Karan Thapar, Imtiaz Ali, Rekha Bhardwaj, and Vishal Bhardwaj. The festival had multiple book launches and discussions on literary topics, encompassing both English literature and Hindi poetry.

== 2022 edition ==
The fourth edition of the Dehradun Literature Festival took place from April 1 to April 3, 2019, at the Hyatt Regency, Dehradun. The festival was inaugurated by Cabinet Minister Ganesh Joshi, actor Tusshar Kapoor, and festival founder Samraant Virmani.

On the first day, Tusshar Kapoor participated in a session discussing his book Bachelor Dad. The festival included the attendance of over 100 authors and panelists, such as Ruskin Bond, Prahlad Kakkar, Piyush Pandey, and Tahira Kashyap. The day concluded with a session titled "Music from the Roots of India", featuring folk singer Malini Awasthi.

Day two included notable discussions with Imtiaz Ali and Richa Anirudh, Piyush Pandey and Prahlad Kakkar, Saeed Naqvi, DGP Ashok Kumar, Amit Lodha, Ian Cardozo and Rachna Bisht. Chief Minister of Uttarakhand, Pushkar Singh Dhami, attended the final day, which began with a session on "India’s Wars: 1962 and 1965" featuring Shiv Kunal Verma and Anirudh Chakravarty. Other sessions included "Creative Complex Characters" with Preeti Shenoy and Kiran Manral, "Murder in the Bylanes" with Aloke Lal and Maanas Lal, and a discussion on "The 7 Sins of Being a Mother" by Tahira Kashyap Khurrana with Richa Anirudh. The festival closed with a session featuring singer Sonu Nigam discussing "Changing Tunes of Bollywood".

== 2023 edition ==
The fifth edition of the Dehradun Literature Festival was held from October 27 to 29, 2023, at Doon International School, Riverside Campus. Nobel laureate Kailash Satyarthi inaugurated the festival, alongside Uttarakhand DGP Ashok Kumar, and author Gurcharan Das. Kailash Satyarthi's book Why Didn't You Come Sooner? was launched by Ruskin Bond, who also received the Lifetime Achievement Award.

On the second day, sessions covered topics such as mythology and mental well-being, including a discussion on myth and folklore led by Smriti Dewan and Reshma Krishnan Barshikar, moderated by Saumya Kulshreshta. Historian Hindol Sengupta and Deepankar Aron discussed Hinduism in a global context. Samir Soni shared how writing helped him overcome personal challenges and supported his mental health.

The final day featured sessions with filmmaker Imtiaz Ali, actress Sobhita Dhulipala, and historian Hindol Sengupta. An award in memory of writer Gaura Pant (Shivani) was presented to Ankita Jain for her contributions to Hindi literature. Other notable attendees at the fifth edition included Ashok Chakradhar, Geet Chaturvedi, Sreemoyee Piu Kundu, Atul Pundir, Khushboo Grewal, and Muzaffar Ali.

== 2024 edition ==
The sixth edition of the Dehradun Literature Festival is scheduled for November 8-10, 2024, at Doon International School. It hosts over 30 talks and workshops featuring more than 70 authors, poets, and artists. The first day focuses on students, while the following days include public events such as award ceremonies and book launches.

== Other activities ==
In September 2023, the Dehradun Literature Festival hosted "Khayalkari – Baithak with Saumya", where Saumya Kulshreshtha recited poetry from renowned poets, including Amrita Pritam, Jaun Elia, Ahmad Faraz, and Munir Niazi, accompanied by musician Harish Budhwani.

== Reception ==
In January 2023, Condé Nast Traveller featured the Dehradun Literature Festival in its list of five Indian literary festivals set in the hills for 2024. In July 2023, Outlook magazine included the festival in a list of six literary festivals in India worth traveling for. Additionally, White Platform Mag listed it among exciting festivals to watch in 2024.

== See also ==
- Literary festival
- List of literary festivals in India
