= Aniruddha (given name) =

Aniruddha (Sanskrit: अनिरुद्ध, romanized: Aniruddha, lit. 'unobstructed, self-willed, unstoppable, undefeatable, invincible'), also known as Aniruddh or Anirudh (due to the schwa deletion in most of the Indo-Aryan languages), is an Indian masculine given name that derives from the name of the Hindu mythological character Aniruddha, the grandson of Krishna. Aniruddha is also used as one of the names Vishnu.

== List of people ==
=== With the given name ===
- Aniruddha Brahmarayar (10th century), Chola minister
- Maharaja Anirudh Singh Deo, King of Bandogarh, r. 1690–1700
- Aniruddha Mahathera (1915–2003), Nepalese Buddhist monk and religious leader
- Anirudh Lal Nagar (1930–2014), Indian econometrician
- Sir Anerood Jugnauth (1930–2021), President of Mauritius
- Anirudh Agarwal (born 1949), Indian actor
- Anirudh Singh (activist) (born 1950), Fiji Indian scientist and social critic
- Aniruddha Roy Chowdhury (born 1964), Indian Bengali-language film director
- Aniruddha Bahal (born c. 1967), Indian writer
- Aniruddha Oak (born 1973), Indian cricketer
- Aniruddha Jatkar (born 1974), Indian actor, singer, scriptwriter, filmmaker and social entrepreneur
- Aniruddh Singh, Indian television actor
- Aniruddha Knight (born 1980), Indian-American Bharatanatyam artist
- Anirudh Dave (born 1986), Indian television actor
- Anirudha Srikkanth (born 1987), Indian cricketer
- Aniruddhacharya (born 1989), Indian priest
- Anirudh Ravichander (born 1990), Indian film composer
- Anirudh Pisharody (born 1994), Indian-American actor and film producer
- Aniruddha Chakravarty, Indian military commander
- Aniruddha M. Gole, Indian Canadian professor of electrical engineering
- Anirudh Iyer, Indian filmmaker

=== Others ===
- Anawrahta (1014–1077), founder of the Pagan Empire (Burmanized form of the name)
- Aniruddha, pen name of the Bangladeshi journalist Santosh Gupta
- Balchander Anirudh (born 1994), Indian cricketer
