= Anuradha =

Anuradha may refer to:dd

== Film ==
- Anuradha (1940 film), a 1940 Bollywood film
- Anuradha (1960 film), a 1960 Hindi-language film
- Anuradha (1967 film), a 1967 Indian Kannada film
- Anuradha (2014 film), a 2014 Bollywood drama film
- Anuradha (2015 film), an Assamese language film

== Other ==
- Anuradha (name), a given name and surname
- Anuradha (nakshatra), lunar mansion in Hindu astrology
- Anuradha (actress), a Bollywood actress

== See also ==
- Anuruddha, disciple and cousin of Gautama Buddha
- Aniruddha, grandson of the Hindu god Krishna
- Aniruddha (given name), an Indian male given name
