= Kalm =

Family name

Kalm is a surname. Notable people with this surname include:

- Anu Kalm (born 1960), Estonian graphic artist and illustrator
- Chet Kalm (1925–2017), American painter, teacher, and illustrator
- Hans Kalm (1889–1981), Estonian soldier who served in the armies of Russian Empire, Finland and Estonia
- Kaido Kalm (born 1965), Estonian sledge hockey player
- Pehr Kalm (1716–1779), Finnish explorer, botanist, naturalist, and agricultural economist
- Volli Kalm (1953–2017), Estonian geologist and rector of the University of Tartu
