= Silent Youth =

- Film poster
- Directed by: Diemo Kemmesies
- Written by: Diemo Kemmesies
- Produced by: Hannes Hirsch; Diemo Kemmesies; Albrecht von Grünhagen
- Starring: Martin Bruchmann; Josef Mattes; Linda Schüle; Mathias Neubert
- Cinematography: Albrecht von Grünhagen
- Edited by: Diemo Kemmesies
- Production company: Milieu Film Production
- Release dates: 15 June 2012 (Spain, Festival Internacional de Cine de Valencia Cinema Jove); 19 October 2012 (Germany, Hof International Film Festival)
- Running time: 73 min
- Country: Germany
- Language: German

Silent Youth is a 2012 German gay drama film written and directed by Diemo Kemmesies.

== Cast ==
- Martin Bruchmann as Marlo
- Josef Mattes as Kirill
- Linda Schüle as Franzi
- Mathias Neubert as Father
- Anurag as bagtit

== Participation in international festivals ==
2012:

- Festival Internacional de Cine de Valencia Cinema Jove (Spain)
- Hof International Film Festival (Germany) – German premiere 19 October 2012
- MOLODIST international film festival – Kiev (Ukraine)
- Pink Screens (Belgium)
- Torino Film Festival (Italy)
- Q! Film Festival 2012 – Jakarta (Indonesia)

2013:

- 15º Festival de invierno (Uruguay)
- 16. Pink Apple (Switzerland)
- Achtung Berlin (Germany)
- Human Rights Film Festival of Barcelona (Spain)
- Iris Prize Festival – Cardiff (UK)
- Philadelphia QFest (USA)
- Portobello Film Festival – London (UK)
- Queer Lisboa 17 – International Queer Film Festival (Portugal)

2014:

- Berlin Art Film Festival (Germany)
- Festival International de Cine LGBT El Lugar Sin Limites (Ecuador)
- Honolulu Rainbow Film Festival (USA)
- Out Twin Cities Film Festival – Minnesota (USA)
- Seattle Lesbian & Gay Film Festival (USA)
- Queer Filmfestival (Germany)
