= Jüri Allik =

Estonian psychologist (born 1949)

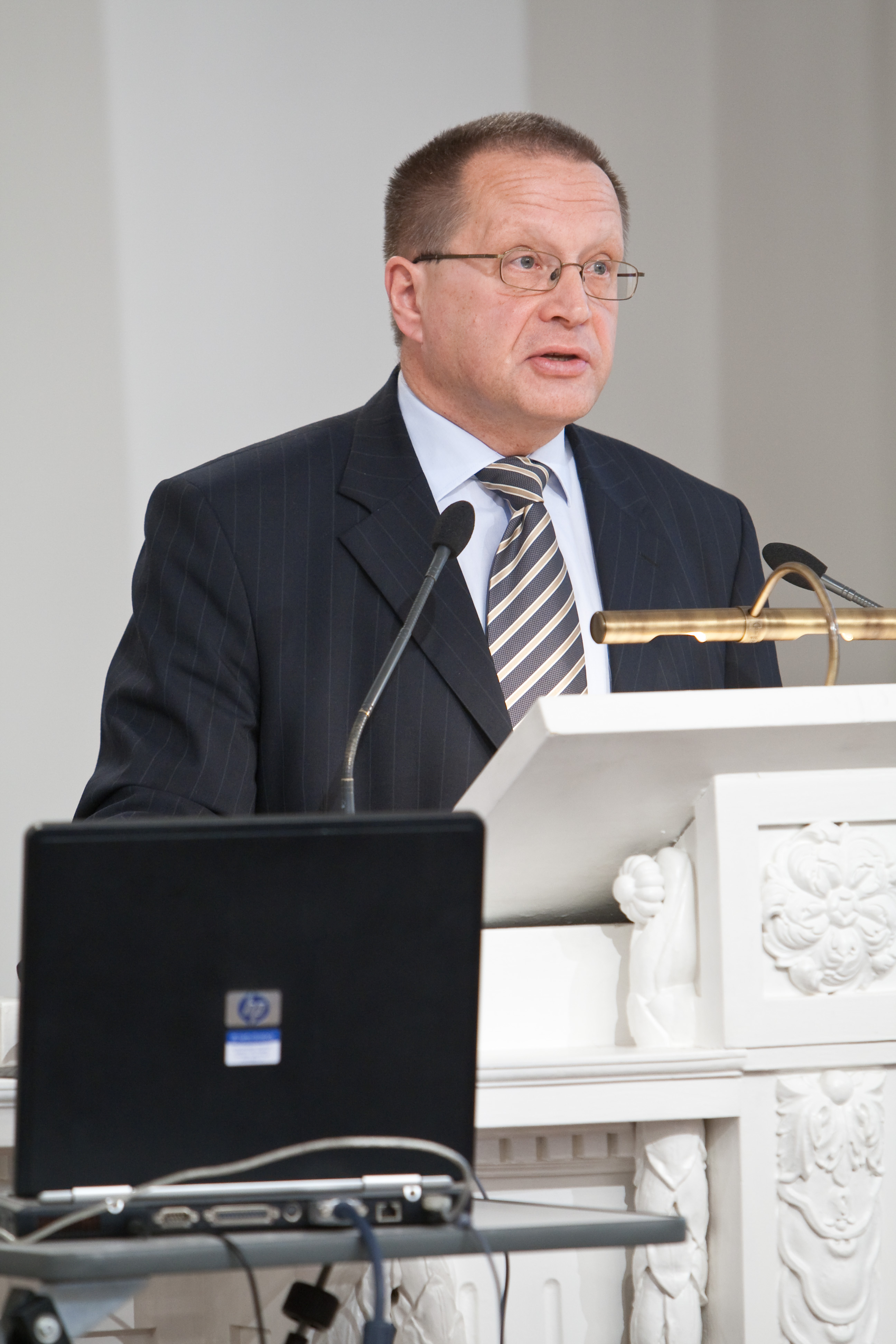
Jüri Allik (2008)

Jüri Allik (born 3 March 1949) is an Estonian psychologist.

== Career ==
Allik holds Ph.D. degrees in psychology both from the University of Moscow, Russia (1976) and University of Tampere, Finland (1991). Spending his academic career at the University of Tartu (with the exception of a stint at the University of Jyväskylä, Finland), he became Professor of Psychophysics in 1992, and is since 2002 Professor of Experimental Psychology. He was also the head of the University of Tartu's Department of Psychology and the chairman of the Estonian Science Foundation (2003-2009), as well as an editor of the Estonian English-language social science and humanities journal Trames.

Allik's contributions to international psychology lie mainly in two areas: visual perception and eye movement, and the comparative study of collectivism vs. individualism. Within Estonia and in Estonian, he has also published highly critical work on Sigmund Freud, the history of psychology, the measuring of science productivity, the transition of science, and quality control.

Allik was both President (1988–1994) and Vice President (1994–2001) of the Estonian Psychologists' Union (Estonian: Eesti Psühholoogide Liit). He is a Foreign Member of the Finnish Academy of Science and Letters, Academia Europaea, and Estonian Academy of Sciences. In 2001–2002, Allik was a Residential Fellow at the Swedish Collegium for Advanced Study in Uppsala, Sweden.

== Personal life ==
Allik was born in Tallinn. He is married to psychologist Anu Realo.

== Selected recent publications ==
- Allik, J., Realo, A., Mõttus, R., Borkenau, P., Kuppens, P., & Hřebíèková, M. (2012). Person-fit to the five factor model of personality. Swiss Journal of Psychology, 71(1), 35–45. DOI 10.1024/1421-0185/a000066.
- Allik, J., & McCrae, R.R. (2004). Towards a geography of personality traits: patterns of profiles across 36 cultures. Journal of Cross-Cultural Psychology, 35, 13–28.
- Allik, J., & Realo, A. (2004). Individualism-collectivism and social capital. Journal of Cross-Cultural Psychology, 35, 29–49.
- Allik, J., Toom, M., & Luuk, A. (2003). Planning of saccadic eye movement direction and amplitude. Psychological Research, 67, 10–21.
- Kreegipuu, K., & Allik, J. (2003). Perceived onset time and position of a moving stimulus. Vision Research, 43, 1625–1635.
- McCrae, R.R. & Allik, J. (Eds.), The Five-Factor Model Across Cultures. New York: Kluwer Academic/Plenum Publishers, 2002.
- Aavik, T. & Allik, J. (2002). The structure of Estonian personal values: A lexical approach. European Journal of Personality, 16, 221–235.
- Realo, A. & Allik, J. (1999). A cross-cultural study of collectivism: A comparison of American, Estonian, and Russian students. Journal of Social Psychology, 139, 133–142.
- Toomela, A. & Allik, J. (1999). Components of verbal working memory. Behavioral and Brain Sciences, 22 (1), 110–111.
- Allik, J. (1999). Perceiving emmattered form. Trames, 3 (53/48), 81–98.
