= Varun Prabhudayal Gupta =

Indian film director

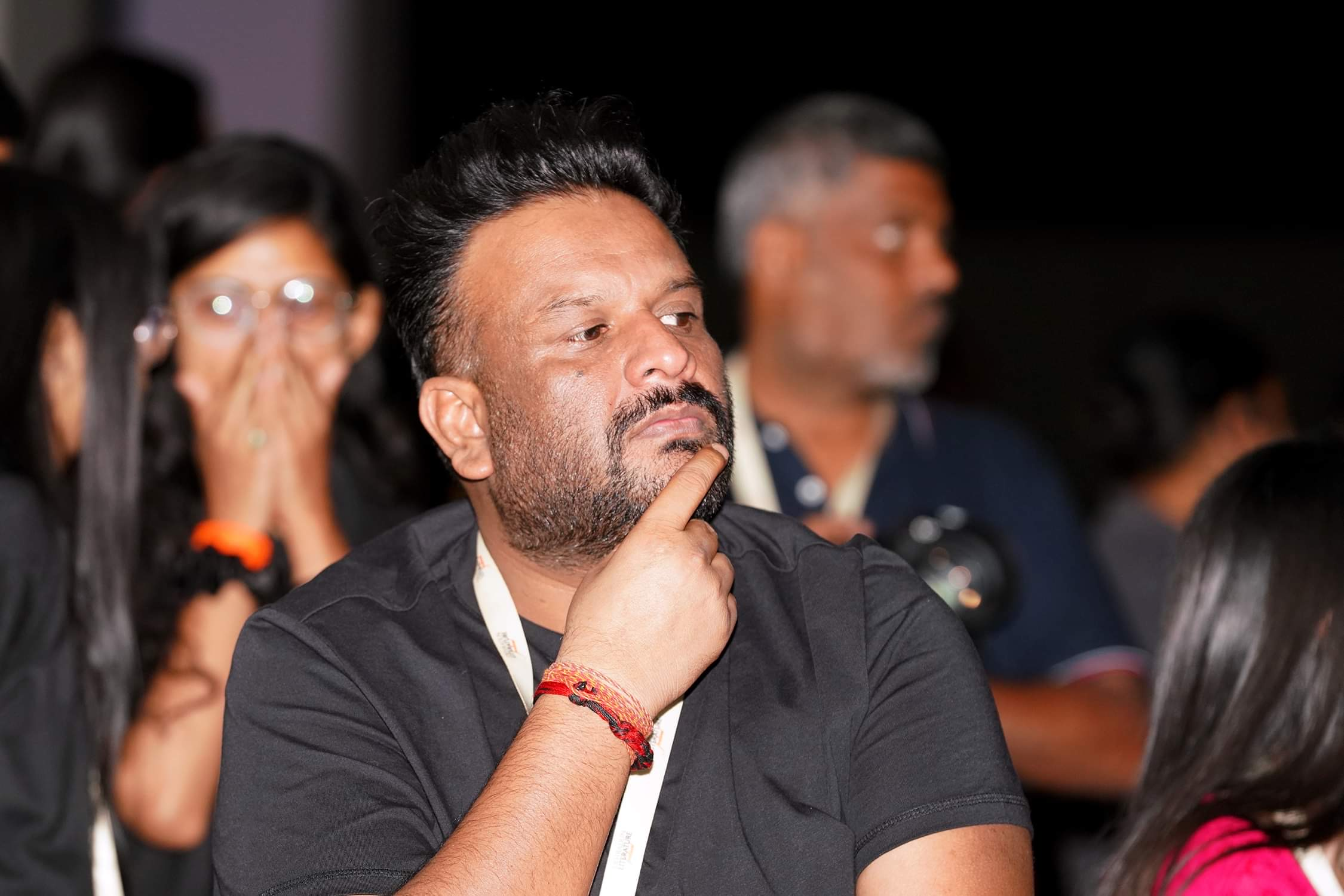
- Education: XLRI Jamshedpur, ICFAI University
- Occupations: Film director, music producer, content curator
- Notable work: Guzar Jayega

Varun Prabhudayal Gupta is an Indian film director, producer and supervisor who works in Hindi cinema. He is known for the song Guzar Jayega.

== Personal life ==
Varun Prabhudayal Gupta completed his schooling from Jaswant Modern Senior Secondary School in 2000. He joined Shri Ram College of Commerce to pursue Bachelor of Commerce degree in brand management. Then he pursued Master of Business Administration in marketing in XLRI Jamshedpur. Later he did Post-Graduation Diploma in Brand Management & International Marketing from ICFAI University in Tripura. He worked as brand manager in Dainik Jagran for three years.

== Career ==
Varun Prabhudayal Gupta started his career as a media professional. In 2020 he worked as a music supervisor in a Hindi web series, Bebaakee. Gupta founded a content curation company and music label, Republik of Musik and The Ampliify Times in 2015. He works as a content curator for Balaji Telefilms and Zee5. Amidst the COVID-19 lockdown in 2020, Gupta created and produced a motivational song Guzar Jayega (in English; this too shall pass) which featured 115 artistes, including Amitabh Bachchan, Sunny Leone and Raveena Tandon. It was sung by Sonu Nigam, Shaan, Babul Supriyo, Shreya Ghoshal and others. The song was submitted for Guinness World Records. After Guzar Jayega, he directed Zaroorat, another music video that included Shatrughan Sinha and Sonakshi Sinha. In 2021, he directed and produced, Meherbaniyan, a single music video by Simran Choudhary; and the remake of Ek Ladki Bheegi Bhaagi Si with Urvashi Rautela. As of April 2022, Gupta along with Imtiaz Ali, is directing a musical film, Jeena Abhi Baaki Hai, about women empowerment. Tiraha, a film based on the 1994 Uttarakhand statehood movement; the sacrifices and sufferings of people during the movement. The film was announced in the Dehradun Literature Festival by Chief Minister of Uttarakhand Pushkar Singh Dhami.

== Filmography ==
=== Film ===
Year	Film	Role
2022	Jeena Abhi Baaki Hai	Director

=== Music ===
Year	Music	Role
2020	Bebaakee	Music supervisor
2020	It Happened In Calcutta	Music supervisor
2020	Guzar Jayega	Producer
2020	Zaroorat	Director
2020	Ek Ladki Bheegi Bhaagi Si	Director
2021	Meherbaniyan	Director, producer
