= Anuradha T. K. =

Indian scientist

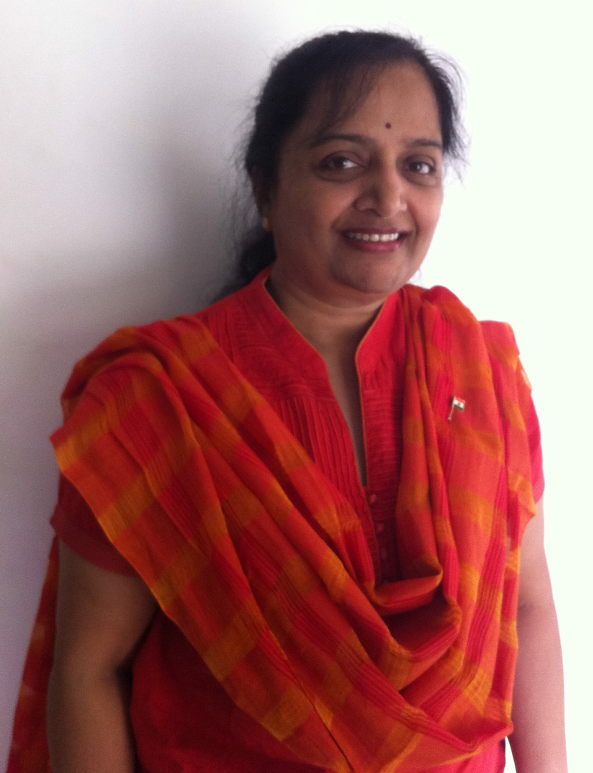
- Born: 30 April 1960 (age 66); Bangalore, Mysore State, India
- Education: University Visvesvaraya College of Engineering
- Known for: Her help in GSAT-12 and first female team leader in ISRO
- Scientific career
- Fields: Space Science
- Workplaces: Indian Space Research Organisation (ISRO)

Anuradha T.K. is a retired Indian scientist and Program director of the Indian Space Research Organisation (ISRO), specialized communication satellites. She has worked on the launches of the satellites GSAT-12 and GSAT-10. She was the senior most female scientist at ISRO, having joined the space agency in 1982, and also the first woman to become a satellite project director at ISRO.

== Personal background ==
Anuradha TK was born in Bangalore, Karnataka in 1961. She graduated with a bachelor's degree in electronics from the University Visvesvaraya College of Engineering in Bangalore. She was interested in science and always wanted to join the space program, so she rejected an offer from the India Institute of Science (IISc) to study for a Master of Science. She graduated with a bachelor's degree in electronics from the University Visvesvaraya College of Engineering in Bangalore. Anuradha has three sisters. Her father was a professor of Sanskrit, and her mother was a homemaker. When Neil Armstrong landed on the Moon in 1969, she was only in primary school. Her parents inspired her a lot so they always told her a lot about the Moon mission. They also encouraged her and her sisters to go ahead and compete in any field they wanted so, two of her sisters became electrical engineers and the other became a very brave and great doctor.

Anuradha married into a family where everyone is fascinated by electronics. Her husband is the general manager at Bharat Electronics. Her eldest daughter is a computer science engineer in the US, and her second daughter is a student of electronic engineering. “My husband and parents-in-law were always cooperative, so I didn't have to worry much about my children ” she says. .

== Career ==
Unlike many of her classmates, she chose to stay in India to pursue her career. The first job was testing satellites at the Satellite Centre in Bangalore, and her boss was Professor Udupi Ramachandra Rao, who later served as the chairman of the agency from 1984 to 1994. Anuradha developed electronic equipment for satellites. Anuradha TK was the senior-most woman officer at the Indian Space Research Organization (ISRO), where she worked for over 37 years. Anuradha is the role model at work. She always said “You don't get any special treatment because you're a woman, you're also not discriminated against because you're a woman. You're treated as an equal here." She said “I never liked subjects where I needed to remember a lot and science looked logical to me. I don't believe that Indian girls think science is not meant for them and I think math is their favorite subject." Her satellite project director has given her so many supports, unlike others who think that women and science don't gel. She has been a leading figure in several Indian space programs.

Anuradha innovation is that she created a way to control the geo-synchronous satellites. Anuradha successfully maneuvered GSAT- 12 into its final orbit through complex operations executed from the control facility in Hassan. It was her Innovate that made GSAT-12 a success. Her method continues to be used today. For the first time, an all women team did the job at Hassan. As the project director, she oversaw the launch of the GSAT-9, GSAT-17 and GSAT-18 communication satellites. She served as Project Manager, Deputy Project Director and Associate Project Director for the Indian Remote Sensing and the Indian Regional Navigation Satellite System programs. Her speciality are systems which observe a satellite's performance once it is in space.

"Her advice to women aspiring to be rocket scientists is simple: make arrangements.” "Once girls see that there are lots of women in the space program, they also get motivated, they think if she can do it, so can they.” Anuradha's growth and story inspire many people today. With her encouragement, more and more women chose to join scientific careers . She supervised and headed the technical group of 20 engineers. As a part of an all-women research team, together with Pramoda Hedge and Anuradha Prakash, she maneuvered the GSAT-12 into its final orbit from ISRO's Master Control Facility (MCF) in Hassan.

After working with the GSAT-12, Anuradha TK led the launch of the much bigger communication satellite GSAT-10 in September 2012.

As the project director, she also oversaw the launch of the GSAT-9, GSAT-17 and GSAT-18 communication satellites. She has also served as Project Manager, Deputy Project Director and Associate Project Director for the Indian Remote Sensing and the Indian Regional Navigation Satellite System programs. Her specialty is satellite checkout systems which observe a satellite's performance once it is in space.

== Awards ==
- 2003 Space Gold Medal award by Astronautical Society of India for the services in the field of Space sciences
- 2011 Suman Sharma Award by National Design & Research Forum (NDRF) of IEI
- 2012 ASI- ISRO Merit Award for Realization of Indigenous Communication spacecraft
- 2012 ISRO Team Award 2012 for being team leader for the realization of GSAT-12 don
