= Everyone Has a Story =

Romance story

- First edition (self published)
- Author: Savi Sharma
- Language: English
- Publisher: Westland Books (2016)
- Publication date: August 2015
- Publication place: India
- Pages: 184

Everyone Has a Story is an inspirational romance novel written by Savi Sharma. This was the author's debut novel and was first published in August 2015. Sharma self-published her book, which quickly became popular and bestselling. Later it was published by Westland publishers. By February 2017 more than 100,000 copies of the book were sold. The recent edition of the book is published by HarperCollins India

== Plot ==
There are four main characters in the novel: Meera, Vivaaan, Kabir and Nisha and everyone has their own story.“Everyone Has a Story” is about a young girl Meera who is in search of a story and but has no idea where she might find it. In search of her story, she comes across Vivaan, a young and successful banker who has a secret desire; that to escape the world in which he lives and travel to his heart’s content. Then there is a coffee shop manager Kabir, who is a friend of Meera’s and is always encouraging her to write. Lastly, Nisha is a girl whom Kabir falls in love with and soon proposes.

== Reception ==
The novel received positive reviews from book reviewers. The Times of India commented on the author's writing style "emphatic as well as poignant as she laces her plot with deep, heart-felt emotions which will move the readers thoroughly." They also found the narrative "enthralling yet inspiring and absolutely honest".

== Sequel ==
After the success of Everyone Has a Story, a sequel Everyone Has a Story 2 was published in August 2018.
