= Anu Realo =

Estonian psychologist

- Born: 15 February 1971 (age 55); Viljandi, then part of Estonian SSR, Soviet Union
- Education: University of Tartu, Estonia
- Occupation: Professor of Psychology
- Organization(s): University of Warwick, United Kingdom
- Known for: Personality and cross-cultural psychology

Anu Realo (born 15 February 1971) is an Estonian personality and cross-cultural psychologist. She is professor in the Department of Psychology at the University of Warwick, the United Kingdom, and a visiting professor at the University of Tartu, Estonia.

== Education and career ==
Realo received her doctoral degree in psychology from the University of Tartu in 1999. She then worked for two years as a postdoctoral research fellow at the Katholieke Universiteit Leuven, Belgium. Upon return to Estonia, she worked as associate professor and senior research fellow in the Department of Psychology, University of Tartu for about 10 years. In 2012, she was awarded an Academy Research Professor position by the Estonian Academy of Sciences for the period 2013-2015. In 2014-2019, she held a position of professor of personality and social psychology at the University of Tartu. In 2016, she was appointed as professor in the Department of Psychology, University of Warwick.

She has been a fellow-in-residence at three institutes for advanced study: at the Swedish Collegium for Advanced Study (2002), at the Netherlands Institute for Advanced Study (2005-2006, 2014-2015), and most recently at the Helsinki Collegium for Advanced Studies (2023).

== Research interests ==
Realo's background is in personality and cross-cultural psychology. She has conducted research on cultural and individual variation in personality traits, emotional experience, social capital and trust, individualistic-collectivistic attitudes, and subjective well-being.

== Other professional activities ==
From 2012-2015, she was as the vice-chair of the evaluation board of the Estonian Research Council. She was a board member of the National Committee of the European Social Survey (ESS), later becoming country representative in the ESS scientific advisory board, and a member of the scientific advisory board of the ESS ERIC (2013–2019). She was an action editor for the Journal of Individual Differences from 2009 to 2013 and an Associate Editor of the European Journal of Personality (2013–2016). She is the principal investigator for the World Values Survey (WVS) in Estonia and a member of the Scientific Advisory Committee of the WVS. In 2020-2022, she served as President of the European Association of Personality Psychology.

== Honours and awards ==
In 2010, Realo was awarded the Estonian National Research Award in social sciences for her studies on personality and stereotypes from a cross-cultural perspective. In February 2016, she was awarded the Order of the White Star (IV Class) by the president of Estonia for outstanding contribution to the Estonian state, which is primarily a testament to her academic achievements. She was listed among the top 12 most outstanding Estonian women in the world 2016 by Estonian World. She is a member of the Estonian Academy of Sciences and of the Academia Europaea.
