= CMS-01 =

Indian communication satellite

- Names: GSAT-12R
- Mission type: Communications
- Operator: ISRO
- COSPAR ID: 2020-099A
- SATCAT no.: 47256
- Mission duration: Planned: >7 years Elapsed: 4 years, 11 months, 15 days

Spacecraft properties
- Bus: I-1K
- Manufacturer: ISRO
- Launch mass: 1425 kg
- Power: 1500 watts

Start of mission
- Launch date: 17 December 2020, 10:11 UTC
- Rocket: PSLV-C50
- Launch site: Satish Dhawan, Site SLP
- Contractor: ISRO

Orbital parameters
- Reference system: Geocentric orbit
- Regime: Geostationary orbit
- Longitude: 83.0° E

Transponders
- Band: Extended C-band
- Coverage area: Indian mainland, Andaman and Nicobar Islands and Lakshadweep Islands

CMS-01 (formerly known as GSAT-12R) is a communication satellite designed and developed by the Indian Space Research Organisation (ISRO). This satellite is a replacement of the aging GSAT-12 at 83.0° E. This satellite was successfully launched by PSLV-C50 launch vehicle on 17 December 2020 at 10:11 UTC.

== Satellite ==
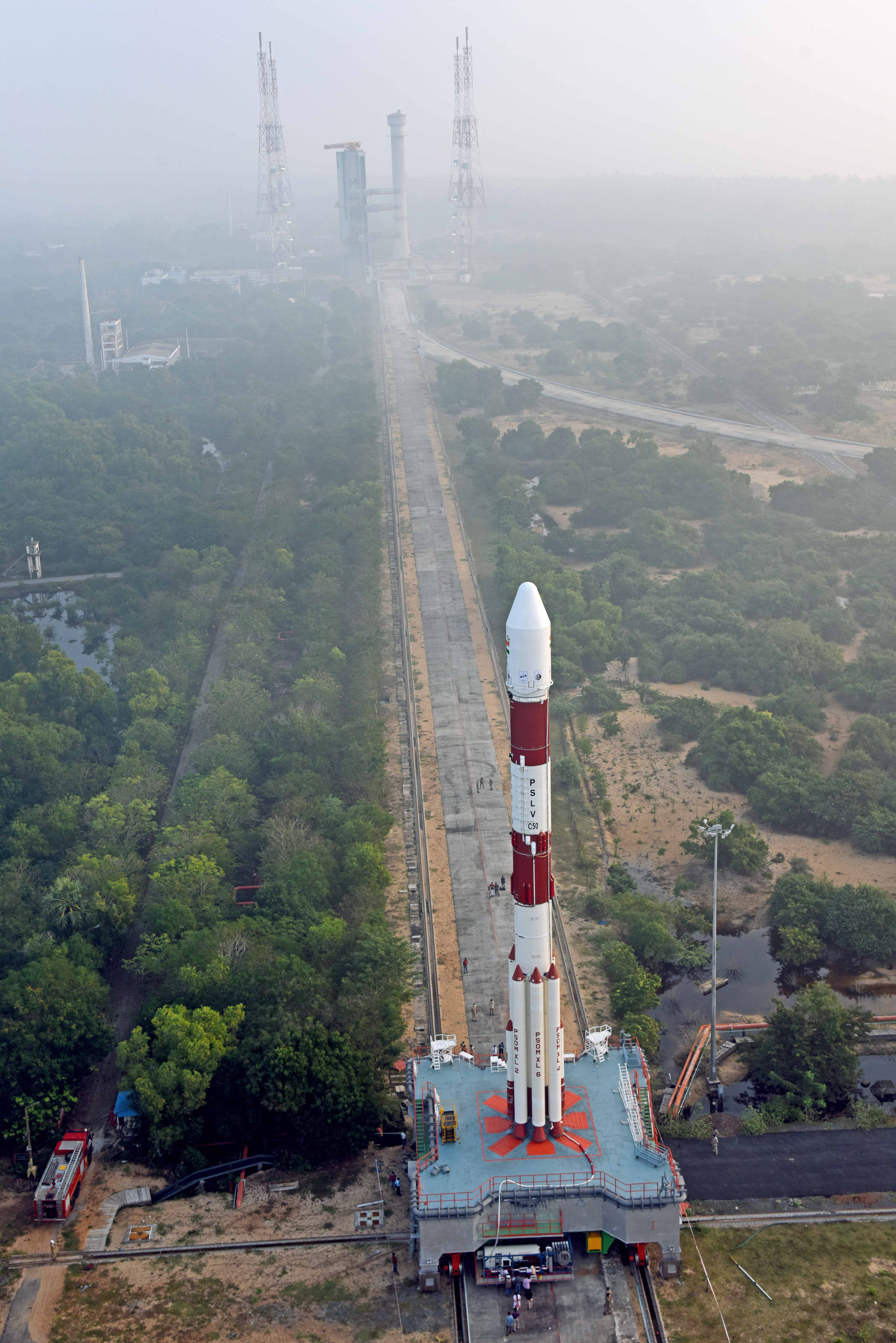
PSLV-C50 CMS-01 at Sriharikota

CMS-01 is considered to be a replacement of the aged satellite GSAT-12. It provides services like tele-education, tele-medicine, disaster management support and Satellite Internet access. Approved cost of CMS-01 is ₹200 crore (US$24 million).

== Payloads ==
CMS-01 will be replacing services of GSAT-12 in Extended C-band.

== Launch ==
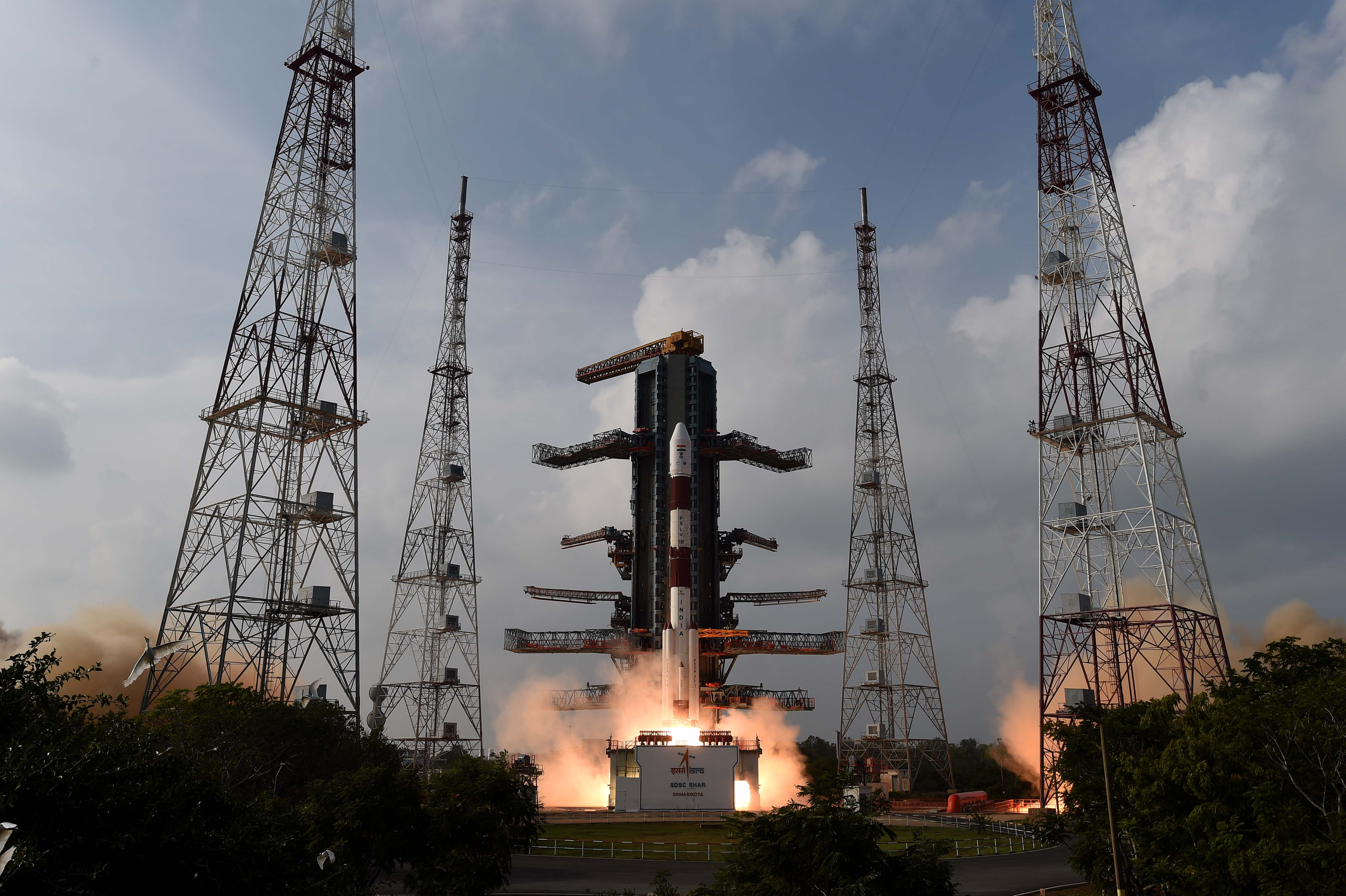
PSLV-C50 CMS-01 launching from Sriharikota, on 17 December 2020.

CMS-01 was successfully launched from a PSLV-C50 launch vehicle on 17 December 2020 at 10:11 UTC.

== See also ==
- GSAT
- List of Indian satellites
- List of PSLV launches
