= The Kitty Party Murder =

2021 book by Kiran Manral

- First edition
- Author: Kiran Manral
- Language: English
- Genre: Crime, thriller, mystery
- Publisher: HarperCollins
- Publication date: 2020
- Publication place: India
- Pages: 252

The Kitty Party Murder is a book written by Kiran Manral. It was published in 2020 by HarperCollins.

== Reception ==
The New Indian Express wrote in a review "Nearly every sentence is packed with jokes and ideas that demand you savour each line for a truly rewarding read."

The Week wrote in a review "It’s a wildly funny, extravagantly inventive, no-punches-pulled, no-expenses-spared tale of a kitty party veteran, viz., Kannan Mehra (Kay, for short) who takes to moonlighting as a private detective for a bit of extra income, and a loads of extra excitement."

The Times of India wrote in a review "Manral delivers her social commentary wound around the murder mystery, bowling readers with her unfazed witticism and flamboyant selection of words."
