= PSLV-C50 =

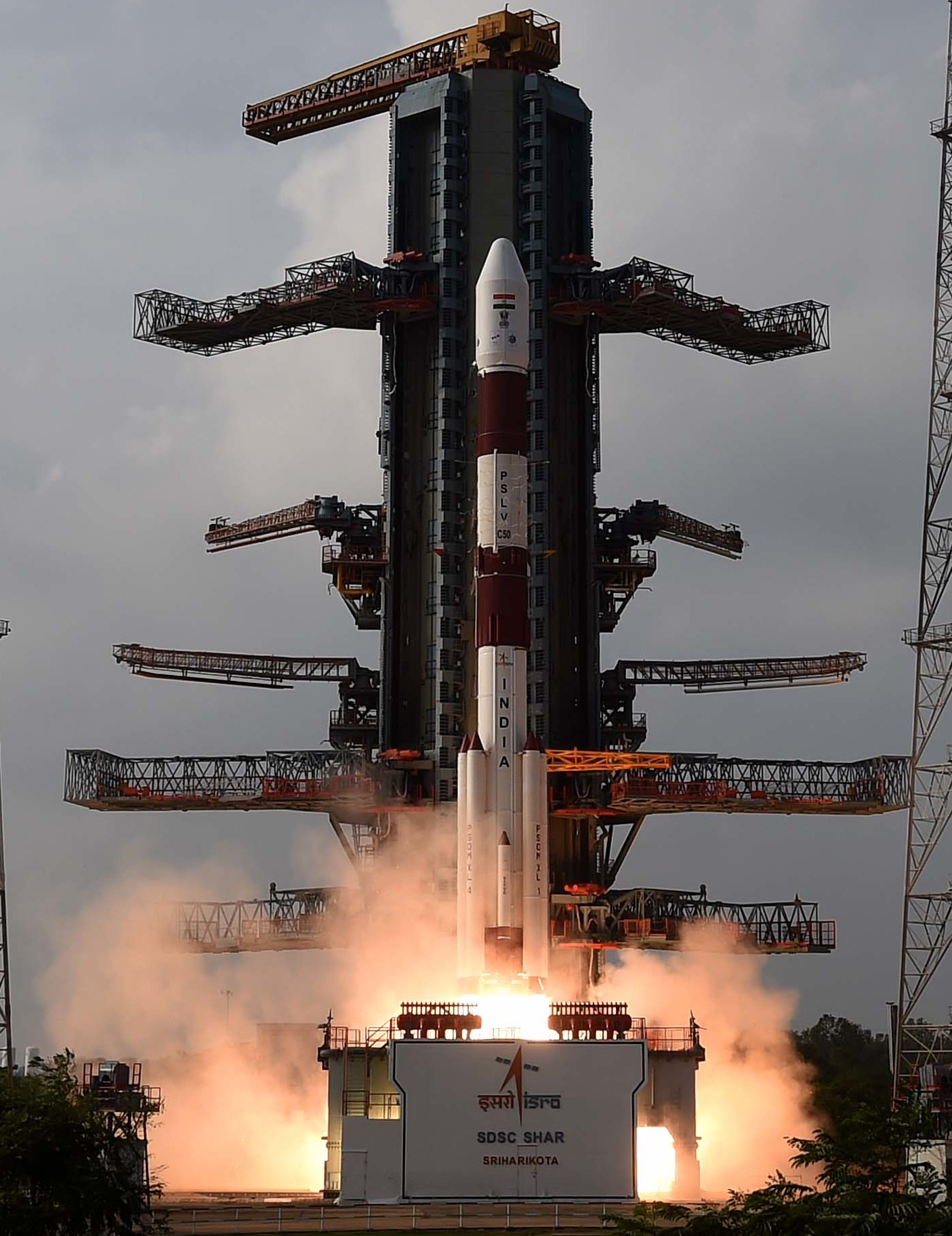
- PSLV-XL C50 lifting off from Second Launch Pad launch pad

PSLV-XL launch
- Launch: December 17, 2020, 15:41 IST
- Pad: Sriharikota Second
- Payload: (India) CMS-01
- Outcome: Success

PSLV launches

The PSLV-C50 is the 52nd mission of the Indian Polar Satellite Launch Vehicle (PSLV) and 22nd flight of PSLV in 'XL' configuration. The Polar Satellite Launch Vehicle (PSLV)-C50 was launched successfully from the second launch pad, Satish Dhawan Space Centre at 10:11 (UTC) /15:41 (IST) carrying CMS-01 Communication Satellite.

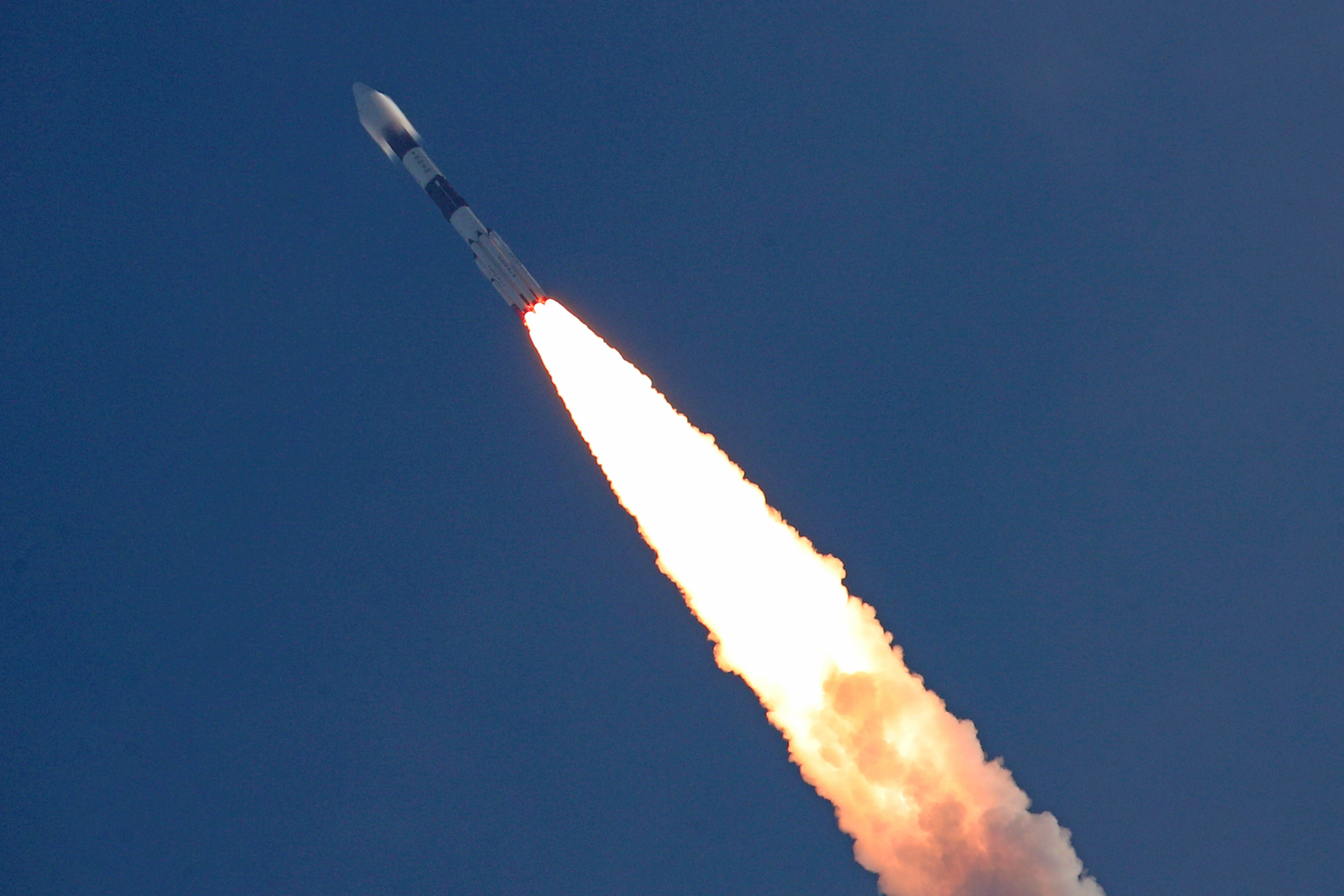
PSLV-C50, CMS-01 ascending to orbit

== Launch ==
PSLV-C50 successfully launched on December 17, 2020, from Satish Dhawan Space Centre carrying CMS-01 Communication Satellite.
