= Anu (disambiguation) =

Anu is a Mesopotamian god.

Anu or ANU may also refer to:

== Religion and mythology ==
- Anu (goddess), an Irish goddess
- Anu (tribe), a Sanskrit term for "man" or "foreigner" and the name of a Vedic tribe
  - Anu, a son of King Yayati in Hindu mythology
    - Turvasu Druhyu and Anu dynasties, dynasties in Hindu mythology

== People ==
- Anu (name), a given name and surname (including a list of people with the name)
  - Anu (actress), an Indian actress
- Queen Anu (died 1696), Mongolian noblewoman and warrior
- Anu (game character) or A Nu, a character in the video game The Legend of Sword and Fairy
- ANU (band), a Tibetan rap group from Mainland China

== Abbreviations ==
- Australian National University
- American National University
- Anant National University, a university in India
- Andong National University, a university in South Korea
- IATA airport code for V. C. Bird International Airport, Antigua

== Other uses ==
- Anu (film), a 2009 Indian Kannada-language film
- Anu (1998 film), a 1998 Indian film by Satarupa Sanyal
- aṇu, the Sanskrit term for "smallest particle of matter" in Indian atomism, pronounced and more commonly spelled as "arnoo".
- Anu (fly), a genus of Hoverfly
- anu, a.k.a. mashua, an Andean vegetable
- Anu-Hkongso language, a Sino-Tibetan language of Burma
- Anu Jur, a.k.a. the Akhurian River
- Anu – Museum of the Jewish People, a Jewish museum located at Tel Aviv University, Ramat Aviv
