= Mart Kalm =

Estonian architecture historian (born 1961)

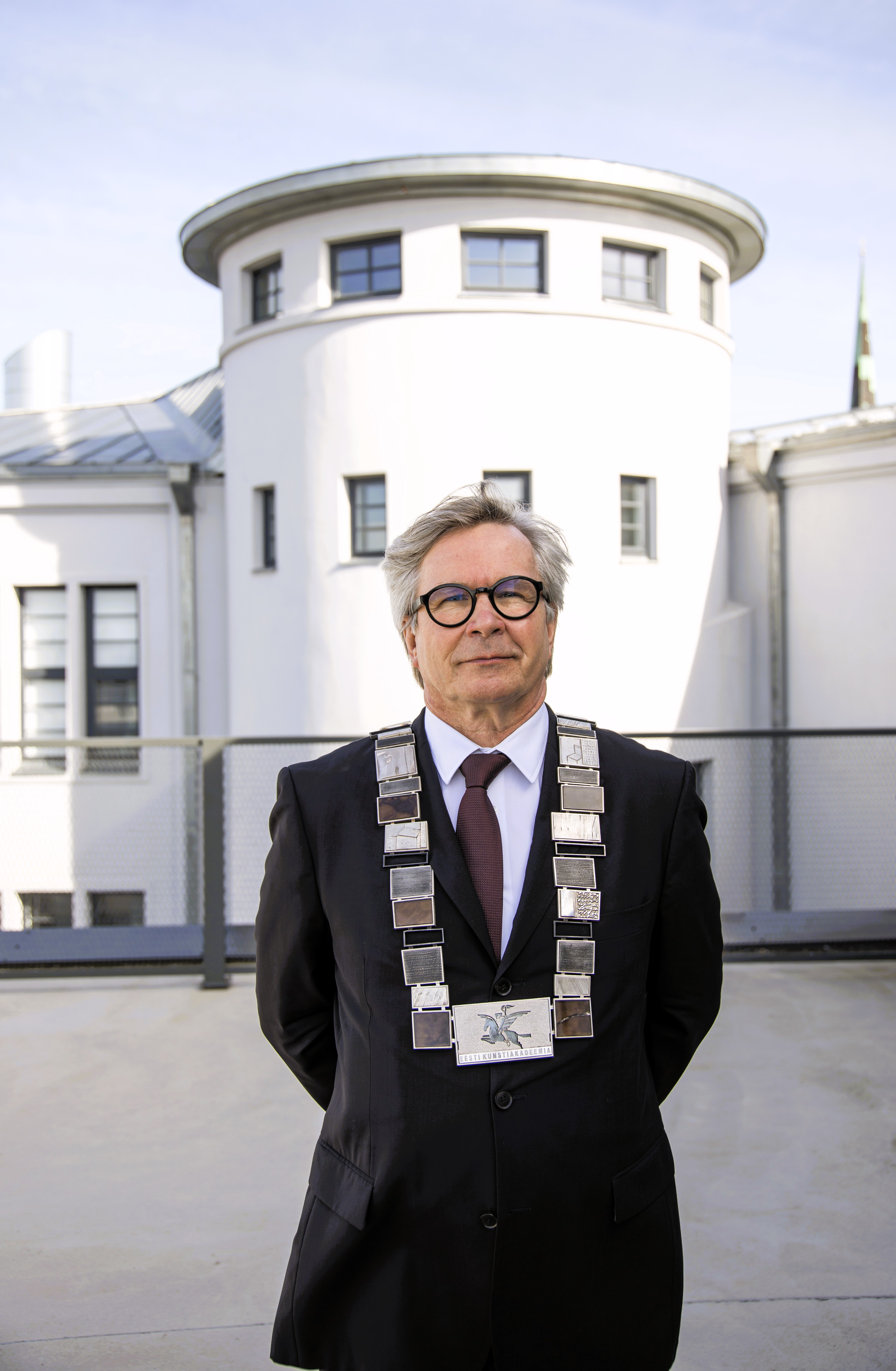
Rector Mart Kalm on the rooftop of the Estonian Academy of Arts in April 2020 after his inauguration

Mart Kalm (born 3 September 1961 in Tallinn) is an Estonian architectural historian, Professor at the Estonian Academy of Arts (Rector from 2015 to 2025) and Member of the Estonian Academy of Sciences (Vice-President from 2014 to 2024).

== Biography ==
Mart Kalm was born in Tallinn into a family of editors. He graduated from Tallinn II Secondary School (currently Tallinn Secondary School of Science). From 1979–1984, he studied history and art history at Tartu University. In 1991, he received a PhD from the Central Scientific Research Institute of Theory and History of Architecture in Moscow for his thesis on the architect Alar Kotli. In 1998, he defended his second PhD (= Habilitation) at the Estonian Academy of Arts on Estonian architecture culture during the interwar period.

As an architectural historian, Kalm has mainly studied the work of Estonian architects in the 20th century (before and after World War II). His most important work is the voluminous “Estonian 20th Century Architecture” (2001; Grand Prix of the Estonian Cultural Endowment in 2002). He has written a monograph on architect Alar Kotli (1994; Kristjan Raud Prize) and a book about Olev Siinmaa (2011), which was accompanied by an exhibition. He was awarded the national prize in history for the compilation “History of Estonian Art”, Volume V (1900–1940), published in 2010. He has written an architectural guide, “Functionalism in Estonia: A Guidebook” (1998), and participated in the compilation of several other reference books. In recent years, Kalm has been focusing his research on the architecture of collective farms in Soviet Estonia.

Mart Kalm has been active as an architecture critic and is interested in landscape and interior architecture. In his youth, he also published art and design criticism. He has often expressed his opinion on heritage issues and composed the heritage requirements for the conservation of the Riigikogu (Parliament) building, the Office of the President of the Republic of Estonia and villas at Rüütli 1a and Lõuna 2b in Pärnu. In 2004, he produced a series of TV broadcasts, “Muinas-TV” (Heritage TV).

Kalm has been a long-time member of the Expert Council for Architectural Monuments of the National Heritage Board, as well as the Head of the National Heritage Council from 2006–2010. From 2010–2013, he was the Co-Chair of the Estonian delegation to the UNESCO World Heritage Committee.

Since 1992, Mart Kalm has been working at the Estonian Academy of Arts. In 2000, he became a professor at the Academy, and from 1994–2007 he built up the Institute of Art History. From 2007–2012 he was the Dean of the Faculty of Art and Culture. In January 2015, he was elected the Rector of the Estonian Academy of Arts. In 2020, Mart Kalm was re-elected as Rector of the Estonian Academy of Arts for a second term and was in office until the end of his term as rector in 2025.

In 2010, Mart Kalm became the first art historian to be elected a member of the Estonian Academy of Sciences. Between 2014 and 2024 he held the position of Vice-President of the Estonian Academy of Sciences.

In 2018, Kalm was elected to the ELIA Representative Board and is also a member of its Executive Group.

Mart Kalm is married to the graphic artist Anu Kalm and they have two adult children, Gustav and Helga.
