= Ashok Kumar (police officer) =

Indian Police Service officer (born 1963)

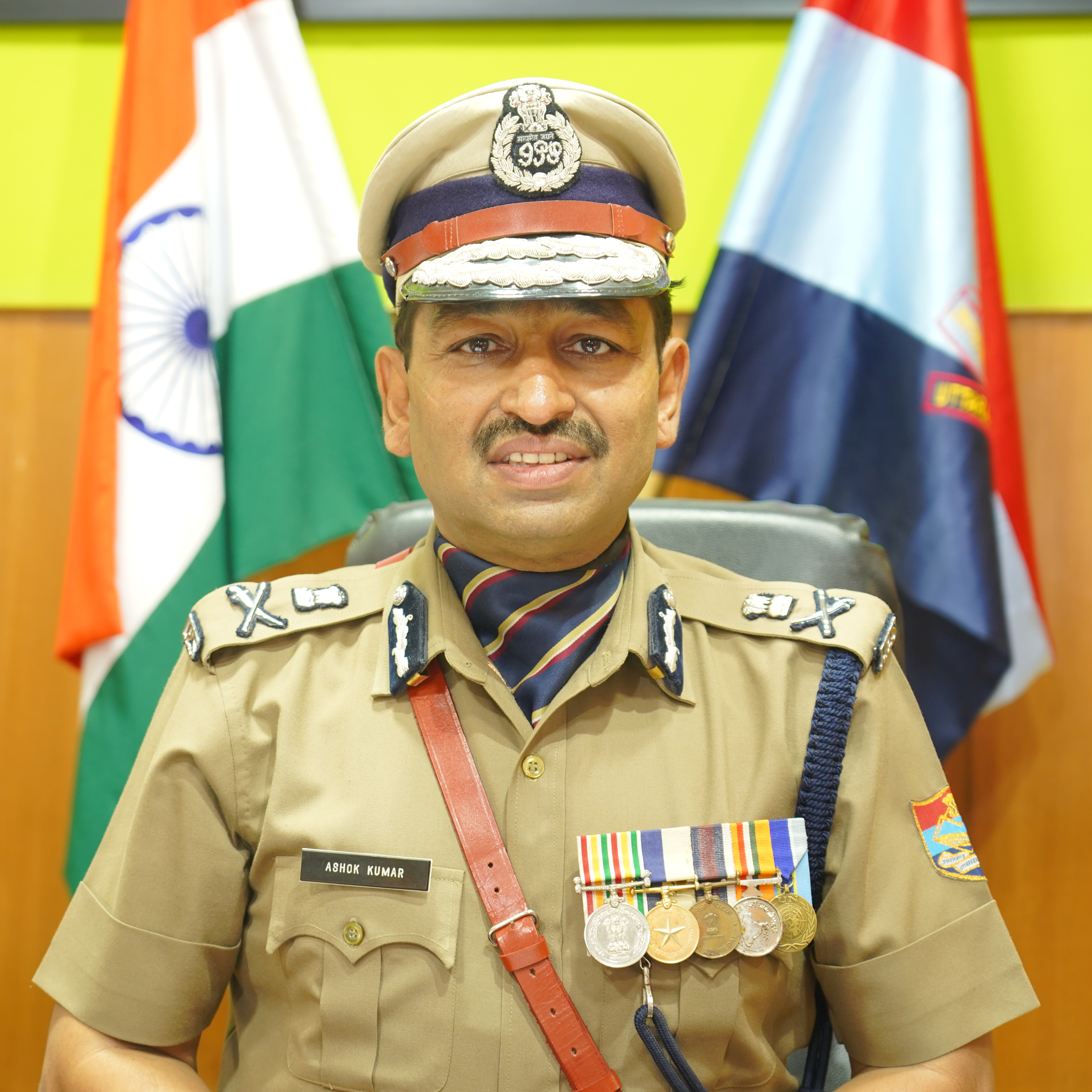
- Born: 9 November 1963 (age 62); Panipat, Haryana, India
- Education: B.Tech (Mechanical Engineering), M.Tech (Thermal Engineering)
- Alma mater: Indian Institute of Technology, Delhi
- Spouse: Dr. Alaknanda Ashok
- Children: 3 (2 Daughters,1 Son)
- Police career
- Country: India
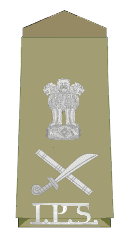
- Rank: Director General of Police
- Batch: 1989
- Cadre: Uttarakhand
- Awards: Police Medal (PM) for Meritorious Service; President's Police Medal (PPM) for Distinguished Service; UN Medal and Bar for UN Mission in Kosovo; Border Security Force’s Maharana Pratap Trophy for Best Operation Frontier; Pt. Govind Ballabh Pant Award by Bureau of Police Research & Development; Outstanding Contribution to National Development’ award by Indian Institute of Technology, Delhi
- Website: ashokkumarips.com

Ashok Kumar (born 9 November 1963) is a retired 1989 batch Indian Police Service officer of the Uttarakhand cadre, who served as the 11th director general of Uttarakhand Police . He was appointed as a Vice-chancellor (VC) of the Sports University of Haryana on 28 February 2024 and served there till 31 October 2026.

== Indian Police Service career ==
Kumar joined the Indian Police Service in 1989 in Uttar Pradesh Cadre and served in various challenging assignments in the state of Uttar Pradesh and Uttarakhand. His initial posting was as an Assistant Superintendent of Police (ASP) in Prayagraj (then Allahabad) and Aligarh from 1991 to 1993. At the time of demolition of the Babri Masjid in Ayodhya, he discharged curfew duties for ten days. He served as Senior Superintendent of Police/Superintendent of Police in Shahjahanpur, Bagpat, Rampur, Mainpuri and Mathura districts of Uttar Pradesh and in Chamoli, Haridwar and Nainital districts of Uttarakhand. As Senior Superintendent of Police in Haridwar, he collapsed the budding network of kidnappers, assassins, and land mafia who were trying to settle their roots in Uttarakhand after its creation.

== Postings and deputations ==
- Assistant Superintendent of Police in Prayagraj (then Allahabad), Aligarh, and Nainital from November 1990 to May 1994.
- Senior Superintendent/Superintendent of Police of Chamoli, Haridwar, Shahjahanpur, Mainpuri, Bagpat, Nainital, Rampur, Moradabad (Railways), Mathura, Dr. B.R. Ambedkar Police Academy (Moradabad) and Commandant (PAC) in Aligarh, Jhansi, Meerut, Moradabad from May 1994 to September 2003.
- Superintendent of Police in UN Mission in Kosovo, Europe from December 2000 to December 2001.
- Deputy Inspector General of Haridwar, Police Headquarters, Garhwal Range from September 2003 to January 2008.
- Inspector General of Garhwal Range and Kumaon Range from January 2008 to January 2009 and January 2009 to November 2009 respectively.
- Inspector General (Deputation) in Central Reserve Police Force and Border Security Force from December 2009 to January 2011 and January 2011 to November 2014 respectively.
- Additional Director General (Intelligence & Security) from February 2015 to October 2016.
- Additional Director General/Director (Vigilance & Prosecution) from June 2015 to December 2016.
- Additional Director General (Administration/Home Guards) from December 2016 to August 2017.
- Additional Director General (Secretary, Police Sports) from October 2016 to January 2018.
- Additional Director General (Law & Order) from August 2017 to December 2018.
- Director General (CID) from January 2019 to January 2020.
- Director General (Law & Order/CID) from January 2019 to November 2020.
- Director General (Director, Prosecution) from August 2017 to November 2020.
- Director General of Police, Uttarakhand from 30 November 2020, to 30 November 2023

== Major operations and contributions ==
=== Hira Singh encounter ===
As Additional Superintendent of Police in Nainital, he led the counter-terrorist operation gunning down two terrorists of the dreaded Hira Singh gang in a 3-hour long, fierce gun-fight on 22 January 1994. Two AK-47 rifles and other weapons were recovered. The gang was involved in more than 100 killings and responsible for many terror activities.

=== Uttarakhand Movement ===
During the Uttarakhand Movement, he was posted as Superintendent of Police in Chamoli. Violence was reported in the adjoining districts, but due to effective law and order policy, no untoward incident was reported in Chamoli. Before the formation of Uttarakhand, he was posted in Udham Singh Nagar, Chamoli, Haridwar and Nainital districts.

=== Ardh Kumbh Mela 2004 ===
He effectively managed law and order in Haridwar during the Ardh Kumbh Mela in 2004.

=== Police modernisation ===
Right after the formation of Uttarakhand, the police lacked infrastructural facilities. As Deputy Inspector General (Headquarters), he contributed in the modernisation and construction of various police buildings including Police Headquarter, Police Line, Provincial Armed Constabulary (PAC), Police Training Centres, Police Stations and Police Chowkis.

To effectively manage the fairs in Haridwar, he established and operationalised the Mela Control Room.

=== Fight against corruption ===
As director (vigilance) started an initiative called ‘Fight Against Corruption’ to curb corruption in public servants. Around 50 such public servants were sent to jail in two years.

=== People-oriented policing ===
During his stint as director general (law & order), he particularly focused on working out criminal cases, victim-centric policing and humane policing which proved helpful and made an impact during the COVID-19 waves.

=== United Nations Mission in Kosovo ===
Served in the UN Mission in war-infested Kosovo as team leader of Crime Investigation Unit for which he was awarded the UN Medal and Bar in 2001.

=== Fight against drugs and terrorism ===
During his deputation as inspector general in Punjab Frontier and Bengal Frontier in Border Security Force, he played an instrumental role in the strategy and execution of many counter-insurgency/intrusion and anti-drug operations.

== As an author ==
He has authored the book Human in Khaki, which is a collection of anecdotes and experiences of him and Lokesh Ohri as police officers across numerous districts. The book has been translated into Bengali, Gujarati & Marathi. The book was awarded Pt. Govind Ballabh Pant Award by Bureau of Police Research and Development, Ministry of Home Affairs.

He has also authored three other books titled, Challenges to Internal Security of India, Cracking the Civil Services Examination: The Open Secret, and Ethics Integrity & Aptitude.

== As a sportsperson ==
Kumar plays badminton. He has won several tournaments. He stood 1st Runner-up in open category in the First All-India Police Badminton Championship. He equally loves Lawn Tennis and has organised many National-level Lawn Tennis tournaments.

He is the force behind the Dehradun Marathon which witnesses participation of more than 20,000 people every year.

== Personal life ==
His daughter Kuhoo is an Indian Badminton player has represented India.

== Awards and recognitions ==
- Police Medal (PM) for Meritorious Service in 2006
- President's Police Medal (PPM) for Distinguished Service in 2013
- UN Medal and Bar for UN Mission in Kosovo in 2001
- Border Security Force’s Maharana Pratap Trophy for Best Operation Frontier as Inspector General (Punjab Frontier) in 2014
- Pt. Govind Ballabh Pant Award by Bureau of Police Research & Development for the book Human in Khaki in 2010.
- Outstanding Contribution to National Development award by Indian Institute of Technology, Delhi

== Positions held ==
- Senate member of Indian Institute of Technology, Delhi for 3 years.
- President of Indian Institute of Technology, Delhi Alumni Association
- President of Uttarakhand State Badminton Association from 2005 to 2017.
- Vice-Chancellor (VC) of the Sports University of Haryana from 28 February 2024 and will serve till 1 March 2027.
