= Anuradha (name) =

Anuradha, sometimes shortened as Anu, is an Indian feminine given name. Notable people with the name include:

== Given name ==
- Anuradha Acharya (born 1972), Indian entrepreneur
- Anuradha Bhat, Indian playback singer
- Anuradha Biswal (born 1975), Indian track and field athlete
- Anuradha Choudhary (born 1960), Indian politician
- Anuradha Cooray (born 1978), Sri Lankan marathon runner
- Anuradha Desai, chairperson of the V H Group
- Anuradha Dullewe Wijeyeratne (born 1962), Sri Lankan politician and entrepreneur
- Anuradha Ghandy (1954–2008), Indian communist, writer and revolutionary
- Anuradha Jayaratne (born 1985), Sri Lankan politician
- Anuradha Kapur (born 1951), Indian theatre director, teacher and writer
- Anuradha Koirala (born 1949), Nepalese social activist
- Anuradha Lohia, Indian molecular parasitologist
- Anuradha Mehta (born 1981), Indian actress and former model
- Anuradha Menon, Indian television and theatre actress
- Anuradha N. Naik, Indian botanist
- Anuradha Pal, Indian tabla virtuosa and composer
- Anuradha Patel, Indian film actress
- Anuradha Patel (sculptor), Indian-born sculptor
- Anuradha Paudwal (born 1954), Indian playback and bhajan singer
- Anuradha Ramanan (1947–2010), Tamil writer, artist and social activist
- Anuradha Ray, Indian film actress
- Anuradha Roy (novelist) (born 1967), Indian novelist, journalist and editor
- Anuradha Sawhney, former head of operations of PETA India
- Anuradha Seneviratna (1938–2009), Sri Lankan writer and scholar
- Anuradha Sharma Pujari (born 1964), Assamese journalist and writer
- Anuradha Sriram (born 1970), Indian playback and carnatic singer
- Anuradha TK (born 1960), Indian scientist and engineer
- Anuradha Thokchom (born 1989), Indian hockey player
- Anuradha Vikram, art critic, curator and lecturer
- Dulani Anuradha, Sri Lankan actress and dancer

== Surname ==
- Umarji Anuradha, Indian writer

== Other ==
- Anuradha (actress), Sulochana, Indian film actress with stage name "Anuradha"
- Anu Hasan (born 1970), Tamil actress and television anchor born as Anuradha Chandrahasan
- Anuruddha, disciple and cousin of Gautama Buddha
- Tara (Kannada actress) (born 1973), Indian actress and politician born as Anuradha

== See also ==
- Anu (name), a given name and surname found independently in several cultures
