= Väino Aren =

Estonian ballet dancer, actor, and operetta singer (1933–2023)

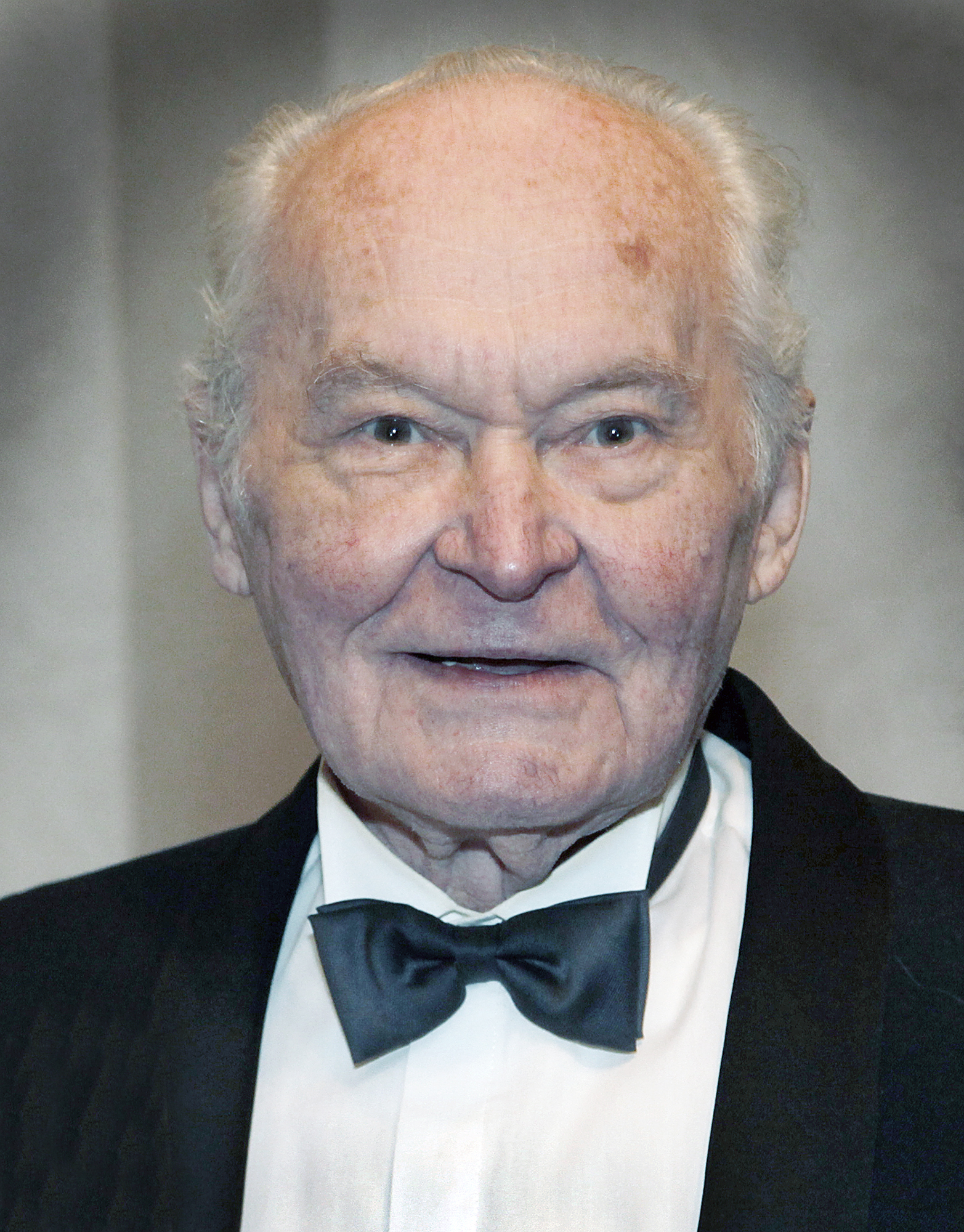
- Aren in 2013
- Born: 11 August 1933; Pala, Estonia
- Died: 18 April 2023 (aged 89)
- Occupations: Ballet dancer, actor, singer

Väino Aren (11 August 1933 – 18 April 2023) was an Estonian ballet dancer, actor, and operetta singer.

== Career ==
Born in Pala, Tartu County, Aren studied at Vanemuine Ballet Studio in Tartu. From 1953 until 1955, he studied at the Leningrad Choreographic School. In 1959 he graduated from Tallinn Choreographic School.

From 1950 until 1971 (with pauses), he was ballet soloist at Estonia Theatre; from 1971 until 1975 operetta soloist and since 1978 a stage manager at Estonia Theatre. He also played in films and television series, such as his longstanding role as Kristjan Rosenkampf-Jägerfreund in the Eesti Televisioon drama series Õnne 13 from 1993 until his death in 2023.

== Personal life and Death ==
Väino Aren's father was a railway worker and his mother a kindergarten teacher. His older brother was actor Rein Aren.

Aren was married to ballerina and frequent stage partner Helju Aren. They were married until her death in 1984. Aren was the partner of opera singer Anu Kaal from 1986.

Aren died on 18 April 2023, at the age of 89.
