= Martin Voracek (psychologist) =

Austrian psychologist

Martin Voracek (born 1966 in Vienna, Austria) is an Austrian psychologist and Professor of Psychological Research Methods - Research Synthesis in the University of Vienna's Faculty of Psychology. He is also the editor-in-chief of the Journal of Individual Differences.

== Research ==
Voracek has researched many different topics in the field of psychology, including the relationship between IQ and suicide rates, and the association between the digit ratio of a heterosexual man and the number of sexual partners he has had. One of his best-known studies, published in 2002, found that female centerfold models in Playboy had become less representative of the general population since the 1950s. The same study also found that more recent models tend to look much less curvy and more androgynous than did previous models.
