= Anu Viheriäranta =

Finnish ballet dancer (born 1982)

Anu Viheriäranta (born 1982) is a Finnish ballet dancer. She joined the Dutch National Ballet in 2005 becoming a principal dancer in 2010.

== Biography ==
Born in Helsinki, Viheriäranta showed an interest in dance as a small child when she began dancing in her room. As a result, her mother took her to dancing classes. She went on to study at the Helsinki Dance Institute and at the Royal Ballet School in London. She was a soloist with the Finnish National Ballet from 1999 where her roles included Juliet in Cranko's Romeo and Juliet and Nikiya in La Bayadère. She also took leading roles in Giselle, Swan Lake and Raymonda. In 2005, she joined the Dutch National Ballet where she became a grand sujet in 2005, a soloist in 2007 and a principal in 2010.

== Awards ==
Anu Viheriäranta has received a number of awards including:

- 1997: Prix d'Espoir
- 1998: Prix de Lausanne
- 2010: Nominated for outstand dancer of the year 2010 by Dance Europe magazine
- 2010: Nominated for Benois de la Danse
