= Savi Sharma =

Indian novelist

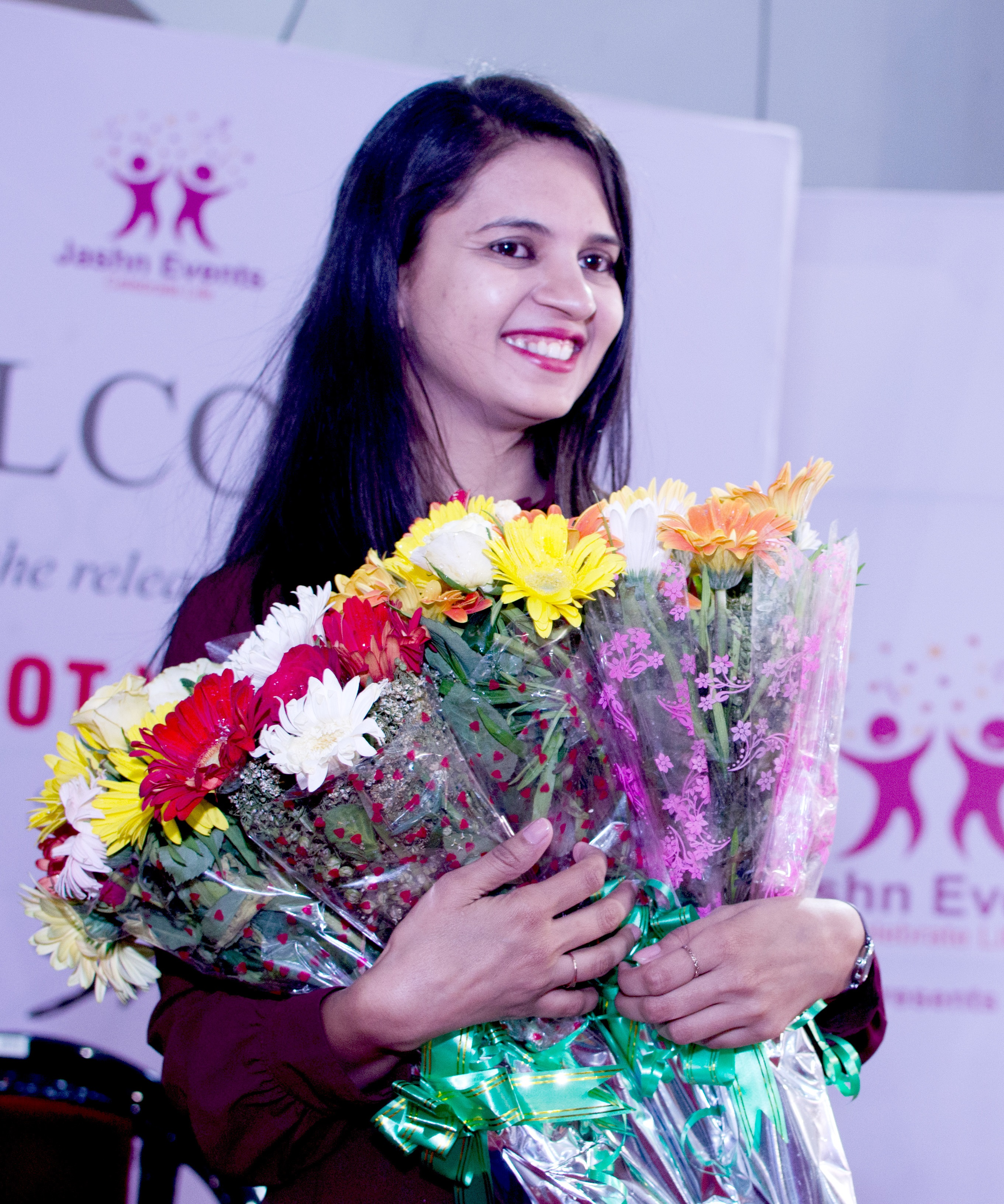
- Sharma in 2017
- Occupation: Novelist
- Writing career
- Period: 2015–present
- Genres: Romance; fiction; inspirational
- Notable work: Everyone Has a Story
- Website: savisharma.com

Savi Sharma is an Indian novelist. She is the author of the best-selling novel Everyone Has a Story – An Inspirational Story of Dreams, Friendship, Hope, Love & Life. She is also the co-founder of the motivational media blog "Life & People" where she writes about positivity, meditation, the law of attraction, and spirituality.

After school, Sharma enrolled for a Bachelor of Commerce degree at a university in Surat and began studying Chartered Accountancy. She decided to quit her studies after being convinced about her book Everyone Has a Story. She self-published it, which went on to become a best-seller, making Sharma India's first successful female self-published author.

== Books ==
- Everyone Has a Story (2015)
- This is Not Your Story (2017)
- Everyone Has a Story – 2 (2018)
- Stories We Never Tell (2020)
- The Happiness Story (2023)
