= Kiran Manral =

Indian author (born 1971)

Kiran Manral (born 1971) is an Indian author. Based in Mumbai, she published her first novel The Reluctant Detective in 2011. Karmic Kids (2015) her first non-fiction work, is an introduction to parenting based on her own experience of raising a son. Manral is also the founder of India Helps, a network of volunteers that assists disaster victims.

== Biography ==
Born in Mumbai on 22 June 1971, Manral studied at Duruelo Convent High School in Mumbai and graduated in English from Mithibai College in 1991. After working as an advertising copywriter, she joined the news service at Mumbai's DSJ TV and went on to work as a feature writer for The Times of India and Cosmopolitan India. In 2000, she became a freelance journalist and, from 2005, a blogger creating "Thirtysixandcounting" and "Karmickids". At their height, both were considered to be among the most popular blogs in India, before she closed them down in order to devote more time to motherhood.

She then turned to writing, publishing The Reluctant Detective in 2011, which received generally positive reviews. Once upon a Crush which followed in 2014 describes the romance experienced by an office girl who constantly runs into misfortunes. Manral comes up with another romance in her All Aboard (2015), set on a Mediterranean cruise ship.

The same year, Manral published her first non-fiction work, Karmic Kids, describing her experience of bringing up her spirited son from childbirth to age ten. One calls for the book "to be read by everyone", not just mothers. Set in the Himalayan foothills, her novel, The Face at the Window, is described as "a dark brooding story of mysterious, concealed identities."

Her novella, Saving Maya, was long listed for the Saboteur Awards UK, supported by the Arts Council England. She published Missing, Presumed Dead, a psychological thriller in 2018. The Times of India called it "a must-read for everyone who knows a dear one battling mental illness." In 2019, she published 13 Steps to Bloody Good Parenting which she co-wrote with author Ashwin Sanghi. She has also written the True Love Stories series and A Boy's Guide To Growing Up for Juggernaut, an app-based reading platform.

== Publications ==
- Reluctant Detective. Westland. 2011. ISBN 978-93-81626-11-5., novel
- Once Upon A Crush. Leadstart Publishing Pvt Ltd. 2014. ISBN 978-93-82473-91-6., novel
- All Aboard!. Penguin Books Limited. 2015. ISBN 978-93-5214-048-0., novel
- Karmickids: The Story of Parenting Nobody told you!. Hay House, Inc. 2015. ISBN 978-93-84544-87-4., non fiction
- The Face at the Window. Amaryllis. 2016. ISBN 978-93-81506-78-3., novel
- Saving Maya. Bombaykala Books. ISBN 978-8193642856. Novel.
- Missing, Presumed Dead. Amaryllis. ISBN 978-9387383685. Novel.
- 13 Steps to Bloody Good Parenting. ISBN 978-9387578784. Non-fiction.
- The Kitty Party Murder. ISBN 978-9390327621. Fiction

== See also ==
- List of Indian writers
