= Journal of Individual Differences =

- Discipline: Personality psychology
- Language: English
- Edited by: Martin Voracek

Publication details
- Former name(s): Zeitschrift für Differentielle und Diagnostische Psychologie
- Publisher: Hogrefe Publishing
- Frequency: Quarterly
- Impact factor: 0.944 (2013)

Standard abbreviations
- ISO 4: J. Individ. Differ.

Indexing
- ISSN: 1614-0001 (print); 2151-2299 (web)
- OCLC no.: 166458646

Links
- Journal homepage; Online access

The Journal of Individual Differences is an academic journal covering personality psychology published by Hogrefe Publishing. The editor in chief is Martin Voracek (University of Vienna).

The Journal of Individual Differences publishes research on individual differences in behavior, emotion, cognition, and their developmental aspects. It endeavors to integrate fields - for instance molecular genetics and theories of complex behavior.

== Abstracting and indexing ==
The Journal of Individual Differences is abstracted and indexed in Current Contents/Social and Behavioral Sciences, Social Sciences Citation Index, and PsycINFO.
