= Estonian World =

Estonian magazine

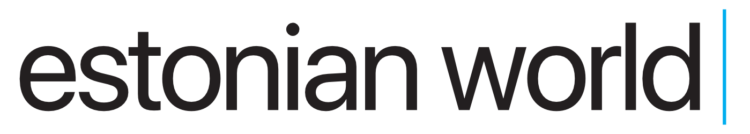
- Editor: Silver Tambur
- Format: Online
- Circulation: 60000
- Founded: 2012
- Country: Estonia
- Language: English
- Website: https://estonianworld.com

Estonian World is an online magazine dedicated to sharing news about the country of Estonia to an international audience, including non-Estonians within the country, and those of Estonian diaspora descent throughout the world.

The magazine was started in 2012 by Silver Tambur, a journalist who used to be an editor at ERR, the Estonian national broadcaster; Sten Hankewitz, a US-based journalist; and Sander Saar. Since its start, it has amassed an audience of about sixty thousand people, a number equal to approximately 5% of the Estonian population. The site is widely read by the international community within Estonia.

The magazine is a non-profit, and relies on donations and state support. The magazine has ten contributing journalists plus a large number of freelance contributions.

== Awards and Cultural Impact ==
In 2020, the magazine won the Avatud Eesti Fond's Koosmeele award (Open Estonian Foundation's Concord award) for "those who have contributed to the development of an open society in Estonia and elsewhere; as well as mutual understanding of the people living in Estonia and the building of a common future-Estonia." The award, which has been granted yearly since 1997, has "a huge symbolic significance for us," said Mall Hellam of the AEF, "as all the awarded tell the story of the important issues of the Estonian society." The magazine is cited by other English-language directed media, such as that for startups (Estonia has a large IT and startup industry), and even the official Estonian president's website.
