= Anu Kaal =

Estonian opera singer, music educator and actor

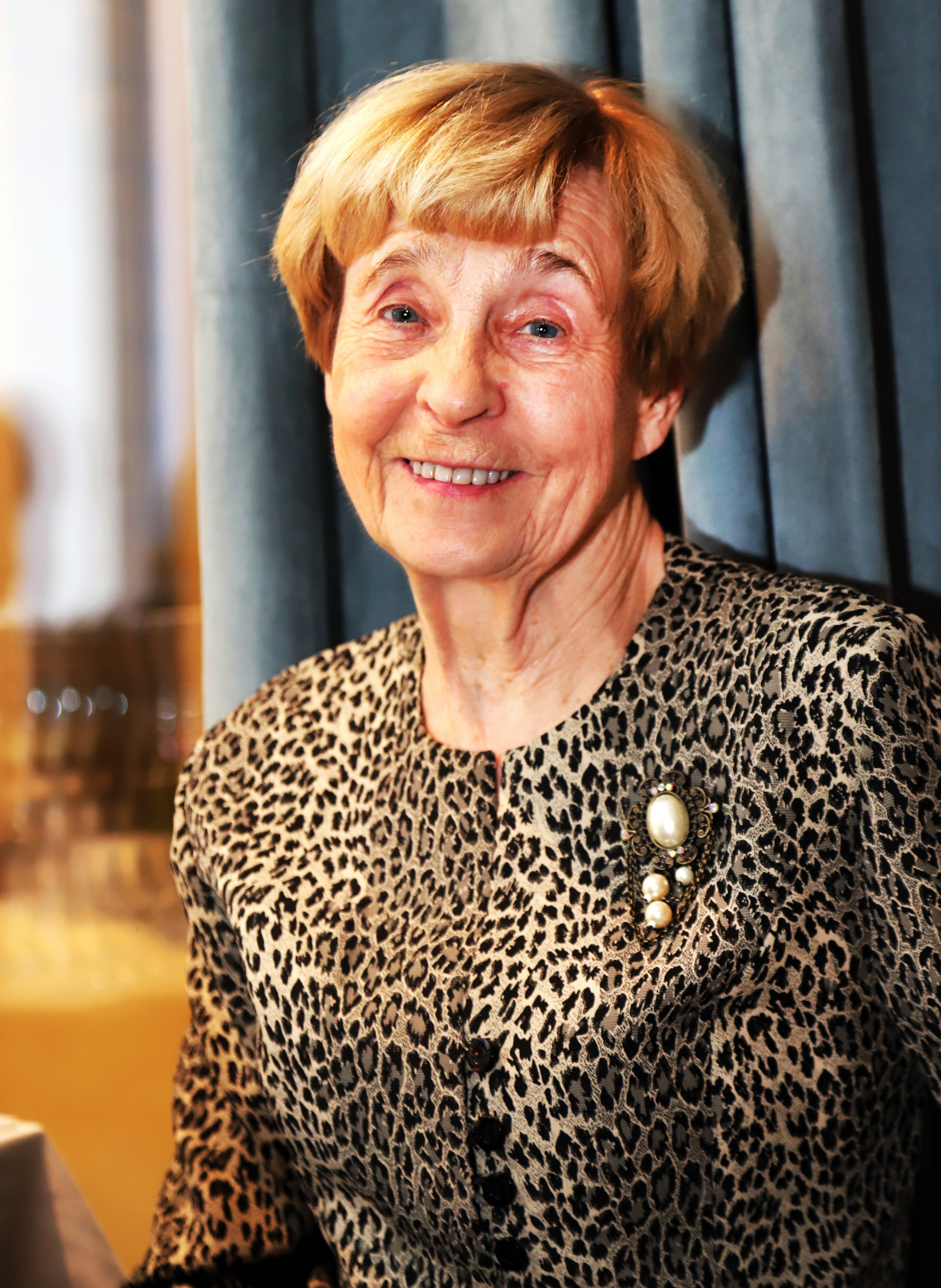
- Kaal in 2023

Anu Kaal (born Anu Kindlam, 4 November 1940) is an Estonian coloratura soprano singer. In 2001, she was awarded the Order of the White Star.

== Life ==
She studied at the Tallinna Muusikakool, and Estonian Academy of Music and Theatre. She studied at La Scala, with Renata Carosio.

From 1967 to 1996, she was an opera soloist. She sang with Georg Ots. Since 1984, she has taught at the Estonian Academy of Music and Theatre.

Kaal was the partner of ballet dancer and actor Väino Aren from 1986 until his death in 2023.
