= Aniruddha M. Gole =

Professor

- Education: IIT Bombay
- Scientific career
- Fields: Electrical Engineering
- Workplaces: University of Manitoba

A. M. Gole is a Professor of Electrical and Computer Engineering at the University of Manitoba, Winnipeg, Canada. Since 1992, he is also the NSERC Industrial Research Chair in Power Systems Simulation.

== Early life and education ==
He received the B.Tech. degree from the Indian Institute of Technology (Bombay), and M.Sc. and Ph.D. degrees from the University of Manitoba (Winnipeg, Canada), all in Electrical Engineering.

== Career ==
He is an internationally recognized expert in the field of power systems simulation. Gole's research interests include the utility applications of power electronics and power systems transient simulation. As an original member of the design team, he has made important contributions to the PSCAD/EMTDC simulation program. Gole is active on several working groups of CIGRE and IEEE and is a Registered Professional Engineer in the Province of Manitoba.

In 2007, the IEEE Power Engineering Society awarded Gole the prestigious Nari Hingorani FACTS Award "..for Contributions to the Education in the Field of Power Systems and Embedded Power Electronics Apparatus Simulation". He was elected a Fellow of IEEE in 2010 "for contributions to the modeling of power electronics apparatus."
