= Anu Aiyengar =

Indian economist

- Born: India
- Education: Smith College; Vanderbilt University
- Occupation: Banking professional
- Employer: JPMorgan Chase & Co

Anu Aiyengar is a finance professional based in Manhattan and Global Co-Head of mergers and acquisitions at JPMorgan Chase & Co, a multinational banking and financial services holding company based in New York City.

== Early life ==
Aiyengar graduated from Smith College of liberal arts in Massachusetts with an undergraduate degree in Economics and Computer Science, and currently serves as Co-Chair of Smith's Business Advisory Board. Aiyengar received her MBA from Vanderbilt University. She finds relaxation through Indian classical dance.

== Career ==
Aiyengar started her career at American Express. While interviewing for a position in 1999 at a major Wall Street investment bank, her interviewer commented 'wrong gender, wrong color, and wrong country'. She currently works at JPMorgan Chase & Co.

== Awards ==
- "Impact and Innovation award" - Dress for Success

== Speeches ==
- Wall Street Journal's "2019 ANNUAL WOMEN IN FINANCE DINNER" (March 2019).
- Forbes Under 30 (September 2018)

== See also ==
- Indian Americans in New York City
