= Lokesh Ohri =

Indian anthropologist and heritage conservationist

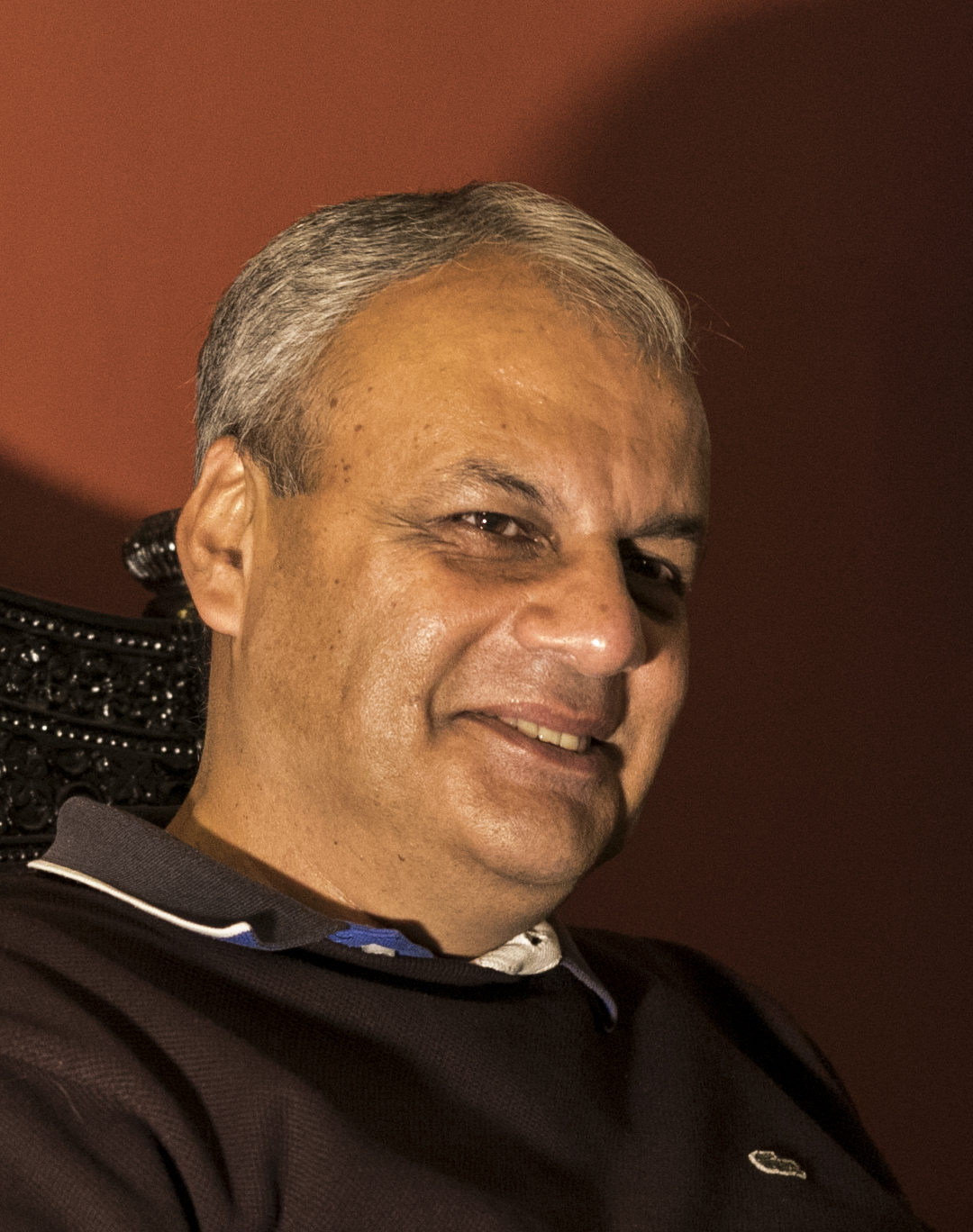
- Born: Dehradun, India
- Education: St Joseph's Academy, Dehradun; University of Heidelberg, Germany
- Known for: Heritage conservation in the Doon Valley, Uttarakhand
- Awards: Marsilus Van Inghen Fellow (Radboud University, Netherlands), Govind Vallabh Pant Award (MHA, GoI), Mahatma Gandhi Award, Outlook Traveller Responsible Tourism Award'23 and '25
- Scientific career
- Fields: Cultural anthropology, Heritage conservation
- Institutions: University of Heidelberg

Lokesh Ohri is an Indian anthropologist, historian, writer and a cultural activist based in Dehradun, Uttarakhand, who has campaigned for the preservation of the natural and cultural heritage of the Doon Valley. He is the founder of Been There Doon That, an educational initiative that spreads awareness about the natural, social and cultural history of the Doon Valley through walks, lectures and workshops.

His work in anthropology has dealt with the ideas of non-human agency, rituals of traveling deities and reflexivity. His recent works, however, have focused on the several voices, including that of Himalayan deities, that critique the recent spate of infrastructure development and consequent exploitation, be it roads, tourism or dams. He has vigorously promoted slow and walking travel, documenting the sacred landscapes of the Himalayas.

== Biography ==
Ohri was born in Dehradun and attended St Joseph's Academy and has a master's degree in sociology. He received his PhD in cultural anthropology from the University of Heidelberg. Ohri has long campaigned against insensitive and rapid development in Uttarakhand, particularly in the state capital Dehradun, which has led to a reduction in green cover of the state, partial or complete loss of heritage canals and water bodies through pollution or road construction, and poor restoration work on historic monuments. In 2013, he founded Been There Doon That, an initiative that highlights the cultural, natural and social heritage of the Doon Valley through public lectures, talks and heritage walks.

Lokesh established the Dehradun based community called Been There Doon That. which is a citizens' engagement initiative with local history and heritage. Today, BTDT, as it is popularly called, is home to a huge community of citizens sensitised to the cause of heritage. BTDT has also commenced work with over 14 village communities in Uttarakhand and Himachal Pradesh to undertake village based slow tourism thorough self-help. This work is significant since landscapes in Uttarakhand are not protected by land laws. The work promotes slow and experiential travel. He has also established Humanities Himalaya, an organisation focused on ground level research and policy interventions in the Himalayas.

Lokesh Ohri has established a public policy, research and action group to work on the Himalayan region by the name of Humanities Himalaya. The group is registered as a public society in Uttarakhand. The work of Humanities Himalaya currently extends to Uttarakhand, Himachal Pradesh and Ladakh.

== Books ==
- Ohri, Lokesh (2019). Till Kingdom Come: Medieval Hinduism in the Modern Himalaya. Orient Blackswan. ISBN 978-8178245423.
- Ohri, Lokesh (2019). Walking with Laata: 50 Trails through Doon Valley's Living History & Nature. Book World. ISBN 978-9381089408.
- Ohri, Lokesh (2022). Ganga Katha-Samagrata: Completeness of the Holy River Ganga. National Mission for Clean Ganga. ISBN 978-8195703982.
- Ohri, Lokesh (2022). Ganga Katha-Samakshata: Along the Holy River Ganga. National Mission for Clean Ganga. ISBN 978-8195901906.
- Ohri, Lokesh (2025). Bridges of Uttarakhand. Indian National Trust for Art and Cultural Heritage (INTACH). ISBN 978-9334314090.
- Ohri, Lokesh (2025). On the Pilgrimage Trail to Kedarnath. Indian National Trust for Art and Cultural Heritage (INTACH). ISBN 978-9334319798
- Ohri, Lokesh (2026). Ambles Across Godland: Experiencing the Sacred in the Uttarakhand Himalaya. Dehradun, India: Bookworld. p. 430. ISBN 9788196614959.
