= Unison World School =

Coordinates: 30.4014°N 78.0814°E

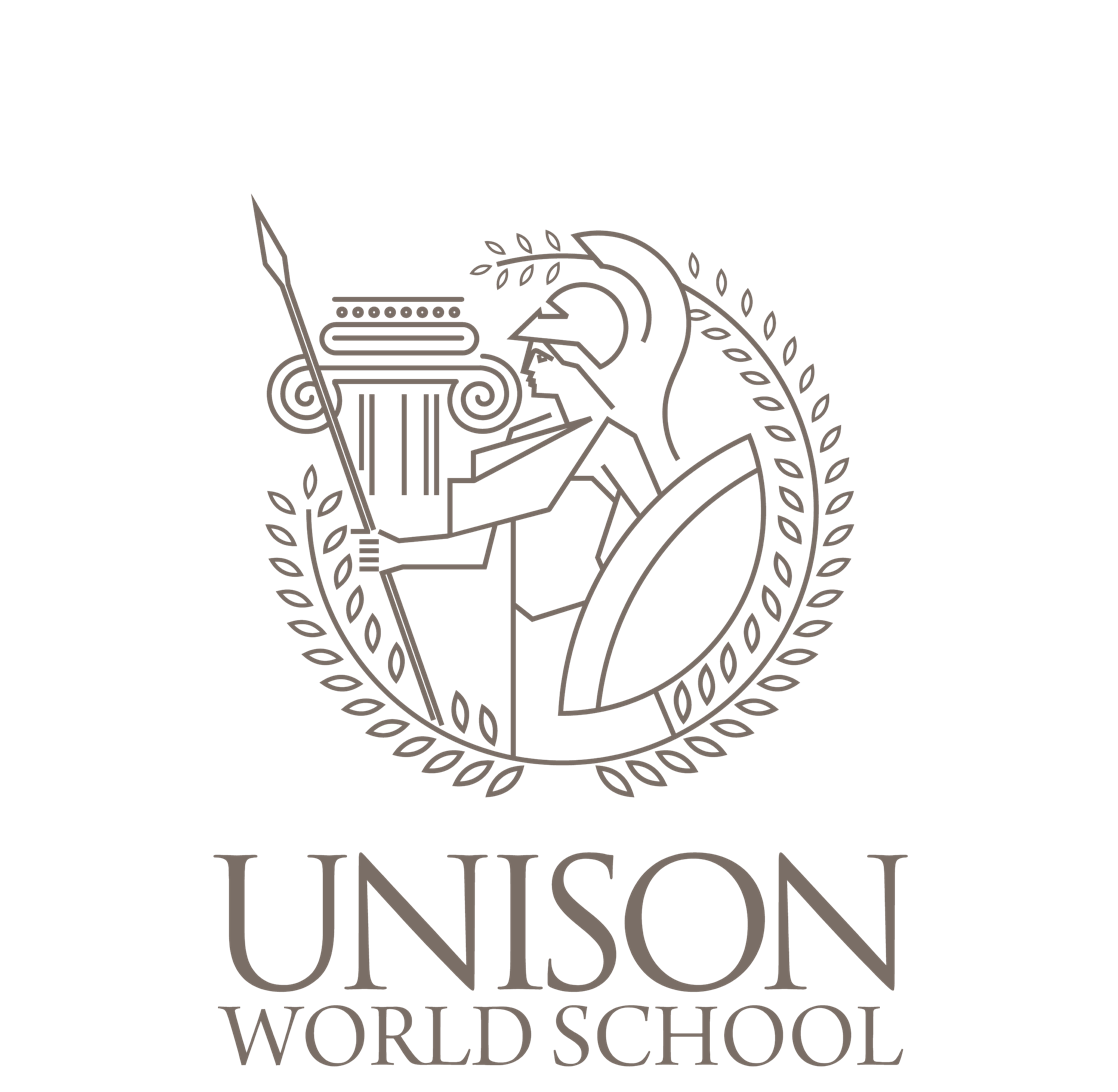
- Bhagawanpur, Dehradun, Uttarakhand - 248009, India

Information
- Type: Boarding School (Residential)
- Established: 2007
- Principal: Supreet Bakshi
- Gender: Girls
- Classes: 6 to 12
- Language: English
- Affiliation: ICSE, ISC and IGCSE
- Website: www.uws.edu.in

Unison World School is an all girls' residential school in Dehradun, Uttarakhand, India. The school teaches from grades VI to XII. Unison World School has tied up with Kilgraston School (UK), Rangi Ruru Girls School (New Zealand), and St. Francis' College, UK for International Exchange Programmes. The school offers ICSE, ISC and IGCSE, A/AS Level programmes.It is known for its wide range of co-curricular activities and firm educational structure. School ranks among the top All Girls Residential schools in India.
