= Anu Saagim =

Estonian model and journalist

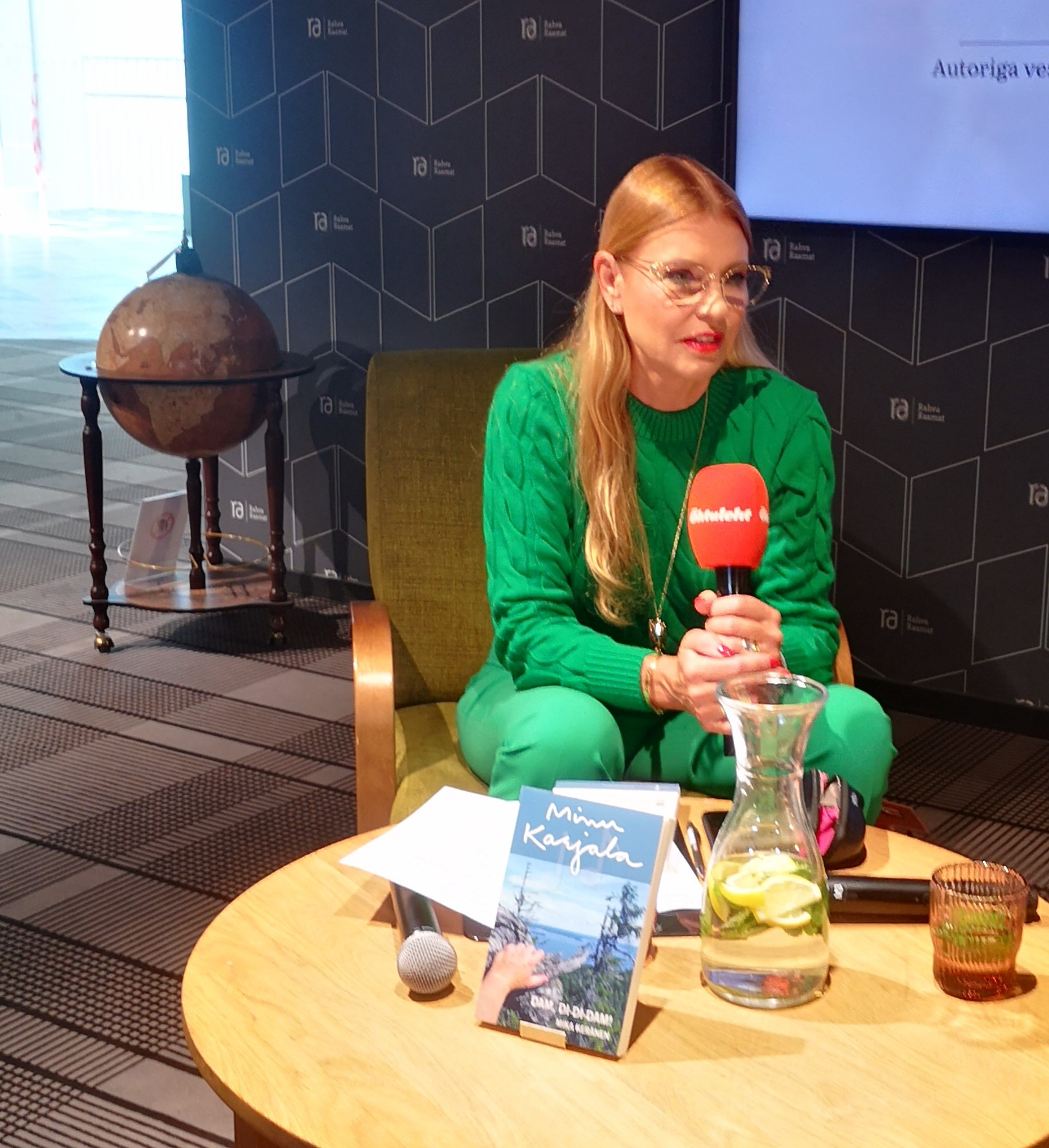
Anu Saagim (2022)

Anu Saagim (also Anu Nataly Saagim-Ratia; born 9 April 1962) is an Estonian socialite, editor, and journalist.

== Biography ==
Anu Saagim was born in Tallinn. In 1980 she graduated from Tallinn 1. Secondary School (now, Gustav Adolf Gymnasium). In 1980, she had a fictive marriage with a Finnish man in order to leave the Estonian Soviet Socialist Republic. She moved to Finland, where they soon divorced. After that she married Finnish entrepreneur Carl Danhammer. In 1990, she began to live with, and since 1994, was married with Finnish designer Ristomatti Ratia. In 2016, the couple divorced.

She has participated on many Finnish and Estonian television programs.

She has been the chief editor of the magazine Just!. She has also been the chief editor of Postimees entertainment portal Elu24. In June 2017, she became the creative director of Õhtuleht web. Since 2019, she has been an editor and presenter of Õhtuleht TV (ÕL TV) online programs.

She has also been active in politics. In 2019, she participated in Estonian parliamentary election, belonging to the list of Estonian Greens.
