= Anurag =

Anurag (Devanagari: अनुराग) (pronounced "Anurāg"), sometimes shorted Anu, is a common Indian first name.

Notable people named Anurag include:

- Anurag Basu, Bollywood film director, actor and producer
- Anurag Dikshit, billionaire Indian businessman, co-founder of PartyGaming
- Anurag Kashyap (director), Hindi film screenwriter-director, including Black Friday and Dev D (2009)
- Anurag Singh (director), film director from Punjab
- Anurag Kumar, Professor and Chairman of the Department of Electrical Communication at Indian Institute of Science
- Anurag Anand, author of books like The Legend of Amrapali (2012) and The Quest for Nothing (2010)
- Anurag Mathur, writer, author of the 1991 novel The Inscrutable Americans

== See also ==
- Anu (name), a given name and surname found independently in several cultures
