= Anu Vaidyanathan =

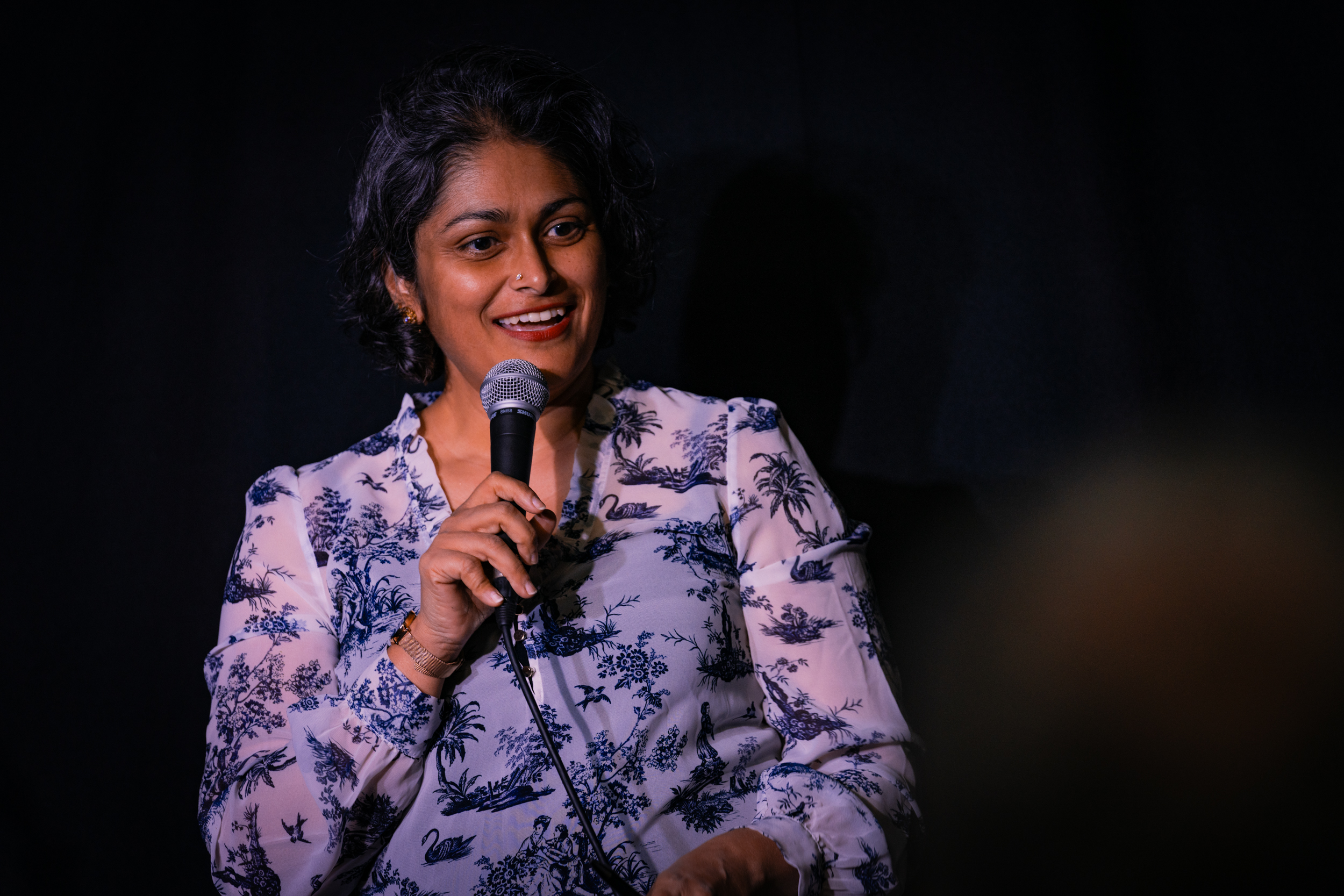

Personal information
- Nationality: Indian
- Born: New Delhi, India
- Education: Purdue University
- Occupations: Filmmaker, Comedian, Writer, Engineer, and Parent

Sport
- Sport: Triathlon

Anu Vaidyanathan is a multifaceted Indian professional known for her work as an engineer, athlete, author, filmmaker, comedian, and entrepreneur whose memoir Anywhere But Home was long-listed for the Mumbai Film Festival's word-to-screen market in 2016.

Vaidyanathan is the founder of PatNMarks, an intellectual property consulting firm, and Avani Films, a film production company.

She made her Off-Broadway debut with a solo BC: AD (Before Children, After Diapers) show at the Kraine Theater on January 12, 2023.

Anu is taking two feature scripts to the market this year. One is a bilingual film in Tamil and English – a satirical thriller with a bit of action. The protagonist is a woman who is a complete badass.

In 2006 Vaidyanathan became the first Indian triathlete, male or female, to complete an Ironman Triathlon. In that same year, she became the first Asian triathlete to finish an Ultraman

== Early life and education ==
Vaidyanathan was born in New Delhi and grew up in Bengaluru and Chennai. She was interested in technology and sports from a young age, spending much of her childhood learning to program.

Vaidyanathan earned a bachelor’s degree and a master’s degree in computer engineering from Purdue University and North Carolina State University. She later completed a PhD in electrical engineering at the University of Canterbury in New Zealand.

== Career ==
In 2009, while working towards her PhD, she became the first Asian woman to complete the Ultraman Canada event. She is the first India-based athlete to train for an participate in Ironman Triathlon. Vaidyanathan was the first Indian woman to have qualified for the Half Ironman 70.3 Clearwater World Championship in 2008

She has served as the visiting faculty at IIM Ahmedabad and IIT Ropar. Her memoir Anywhere But Home – Adventures in Endurance, was published in 2016.

== See also ==
- Sports in India
