= Hindol Sengupta =

Indian historian and journalist (born 1979)

Hindol Sengupta (born 1979 in Jamshedpur) is an Indian historian, academic, and journalist. Sengupta lives in Delhi and is professor of international relations at O. P. Jindal Global University. He has been Vice President, Invest India, the national investment promotion agency of the government of India, and Editor-at-Large at Fortune India where he writes a weekly column. He is also a columnist for Aspen Italia and The New Indian Express.

== Education ==
He was educated in South Asian history and politics at Worcester College, Oxford, as a Chevening Scholar, in business and finance as a Knight-Bagehot Fellow at Columbia University, and in journalism and film-making at Jamia Millia Islamia and Delhi University.

== Work ==
In 2019, his book The Man Who Saved India won the prize for best work of non-fiction at the Valley of Words literary festival in India. In 2018, he became the only Indian to win the Wilbur Award given by the Religion Communicators Council of America for his book Being Hindu. In 2015, his book Recasting India was shortlisted for the Hayek Prize given by the Manhattan Institute. He was also awarded the PSF Award in 2015 for his contribution to writing. His books have been reviewed in multiple media outlets.

In 2017, he was selected as a Young Global Leader by the World Economic Forum. He is a co-founder of the Whypoll Trust which garnered media attention after mapping places in Delhi that were dangerous for women, and following up with releasing an emergency smartphone-app.

Hindol Sengupta’s tenth book Sing, Dance and Pray was released on May 14, 2022. This is the authorized biography of Srila Prabhupada, Founder-Acharya of ISKCON.

Sing, Dance and Pray was published by Penguin Random House India.

The (then) Vice President of India Venkaiah Naidu appreciated the book and said “Dr. Hindol Sengupta has captured all the important aspects in this book that will be a fitting tribute to Srila Prabhupada on his 125th birth anniversary.”

Sudha Murty, author and philanthropist, said that after reading the book, she truly understood Prabhupada’s vision, and who this person really was. She added, “the book is more successful because it brings in a ‘logically convincing’ point of view to prove why Prabhupada is so influential.”

== Books ==
=== Non-fiction ===
- Indian Fashion, Pearson Education, 2005, 255 p. Foreword by Ritu Kumar.
- Rampup: The Business of Indian Fashion, Pearson Power, 2009, 233 p. Forewords by JJ Valaya, Tina and Tarun Tahiliani.
- The Liberals, HarperCollins, 2012, 311 p.
- 100 Things To Know and Before You Vote, HarperCollins, 2014, 242 p.
- Recasting India: How Entrepreneurship is Revolutionizing the World's Largest Democracy, Palgrave Macmillan, 2014, 249 p.
- Being Hindu: Old Faith, New World and You, Penguin Books, 2015, 192 p.
- The Modern Monk, Penguin Books, 2016, 304 p.
- The Man who Saved India: Sardar Patel and His Idea of India, Penguin Books, 2018, 437 p.
- Sing, Dance and Pray, Penguin Books, 2022, 275 p.
- Soul and Sword: The History of Political Hinduism, Rowman and Littlefield, Penguin Books, 2023, 202 p.
- Life, Death and the Ashtavakra Gita, with Bibek Debroy, Grin Books, 2024, p. 215
- Sing, Dance and Lead, Penguin Books, 2025, p. 232

=== Fiction ===
- The Sacred Sword: The Legend of Guru Gobind Singh, Gurgaon : Penguin Books, 2017, 231 p.
