= Anirudh Lal Nagar =

Indian econometrician

- Born: 4 October 1930; Allahabad, India
- Died: 4 February 2014 (aged 83); Pune, India
- Citizenship: Indian
- Education: Lucknow University; Erasmus University Rotterdam
- Known for: Finite-Sample Inference
- Scientific career
- Fields: Economics, Econometrics
- Workplaces: Delhi School of Economics; Delhi University; IIT Kanpur; Purdue University
- Doctoral advisor: Henri Theil

Anirudh Lal Nagar (4 October 1930 – 4 February 2014) was an Indian econometrician who was notable for his work on the finite-sample inference in econometrics.

== Early life and education ==
Born in Allahabad, Nagar earned a Master's in statistics from Lucknow University in 1951, and a Ph.D. in Economics from Erasmus University Rotterdam under the supervision of Henri Theil.

== Death ==
He died on 4 February 2014, in Pune.
