= Anu Põder =

Estonian sculptor

Anu Põder (17 November 1947 – 17 January 2013) was an Estonian visual artist.

Põder was born in Kanepi. She graduated from Tartu 8th Secondary School (now, the Tartu Forseliuse School) in 1967, then enrolled at the Tartu Art College later that year before leaving in 1970 to study sculpture at the Estonian National Art Institute, graduating in 1976.

From In 1976 until 1988, she was a freelance artist and from 1988 until 1989, she was a teacher of form studies at Secondary School No. 46 in Tallinn. In 1989, she began working as an art teacher at the Tallinn Art School, leaving in 1993 for a position as a teacher of form at the Estonian Academy of Arts. In 1998, she began working as a teacher of form at the College of Applied Arts of the Estonian Academy of Arts, and in-service teacher training courses. From 1999 onward, she worked as a teacher at the EAA Teacher Training Centre.

Work by Põder is in the collection of the Tate Modern and the Art Museum of Estonia. International recognition for Põder did not come until after the exhibition Anu Põder: Be Fragile! Be Brave, curated by Rebeka Põldsam for the Kumu.

Anu Põder died in Tallinn, aged 65.

Swiss art historian Jörg Scheller acknowledged Põder's work in Artforum as exemplary for the "the versatility of Eastern European art and the individual’s ability to subvert the boundaries set by institutions and discourses" in the Soviet Union: "Like many artists who did not conform to the aesthetic-political doctrine, but were not open dissenters, either, Põder created a niche for herself within the system. It is precisely this state of in-between that makes her work so interesting and that illuminates the genealogies of Eastern European art in general.
