= GSAT-12 =

Telecommunications satellite

- Mission type: Communications
- Operator: ISRO
- COSPAR ID: 2011-034A
- SATCAT no.: 37746
- Mission duration: Planned: 8 years Duration: 11 years, 8 months, 8 days

Spacecraft properties
- Launch mass: 1,412 kilograms (3,113 lb)
- Dry mass: 559 kilograms (1,232 lb)

Start of mission
- Launch date: 15 July 2011, 11:18 UTC
- Rocket: PSLV-XL C17
- Launch site: Satish Dhawan SLP
- Contractor: ISRO

End of mission
- Disposal: Graveyard orbit
- Deactivated: March 2023

Orbital parameters
- Reference system: Geocentric
- Regime: Geostationary
- Longitude: 48°E (Relocated: 19 Mar 2021.); 83°E (till 9 Feb 2021)
- Perigee altitude: 35,782 kilometres (22,234 mi)
- Apogee altitude: 35,803 kilometres (22,247 mi)
- Inclination: 0.01 degrees
- Period: 23.93 hours
- Epoch: 25 December 2013, 01:49:32 UTC

Transponders
- Band: 12 Extended C band

GSAT-12 was a communication satellite designed and developed by the Indian Space Research Organisation. It was the second satellite to be launched and placed on a GTO using PSLV.

== Satellite ==
GSAT-12 was considered to be a replacement of the aged satellite INSAT-3B. It provided services like tele-education, tele-medicine, disaster management support and satellite internet access.

== Payloads ==
GSAT-12 was equipped with 12 Extended C-band transponders.

== Launch ==
GSAT-12 was launched onboard PSLV-XL C17 from second launch pad of Satish Dhawan Space Centre on July 15, 2011. The tentative life of satellite was 8 years.

== Replacement and relocation ==
While GSAT-12 was still operational a replacement satellite CMS-01(formerly GSAT-12R) was launched on 17 December 2020. GSAT-12 was relocated from 83°E slot to 48°E slot on 19 March 2021.

== End of mission ==
In March 2023 GSAT-12 was retired from its operational service. After seven maneuvers to raise the satellite to a circular graveyard orbit, 390 kilometres (240 mi) above GEO belt.
