= Aniruddha Chakravarty =

Lt Gen Aniruddha Chakravarty is an Indian military commander and the director general of India's National Cadet Corps, a position he has held since December 2013. He is a graduate of Defence Services Staff College, Wellington.

Chakravarty has held various staff and regimental appointments during his career. He commanded 3 Rajput company at the Siachen Glacier from 1996 to 1999, commanded a brigade on the Line of Control, and was the GOC of 15 Infantry Division in 2011–2012.

He was awarded Vishisht Seva Medal for his distinguished service in preparation of the AV Singh Committee Report, while serving as a colonel in the Integrated HQ of MoD (Army) in 2000–2003. He is married to Falguni Chakravarty and they have two daughters.
