= Anu Kalm =

Estonian graphic artist and illustrator (born 1960)

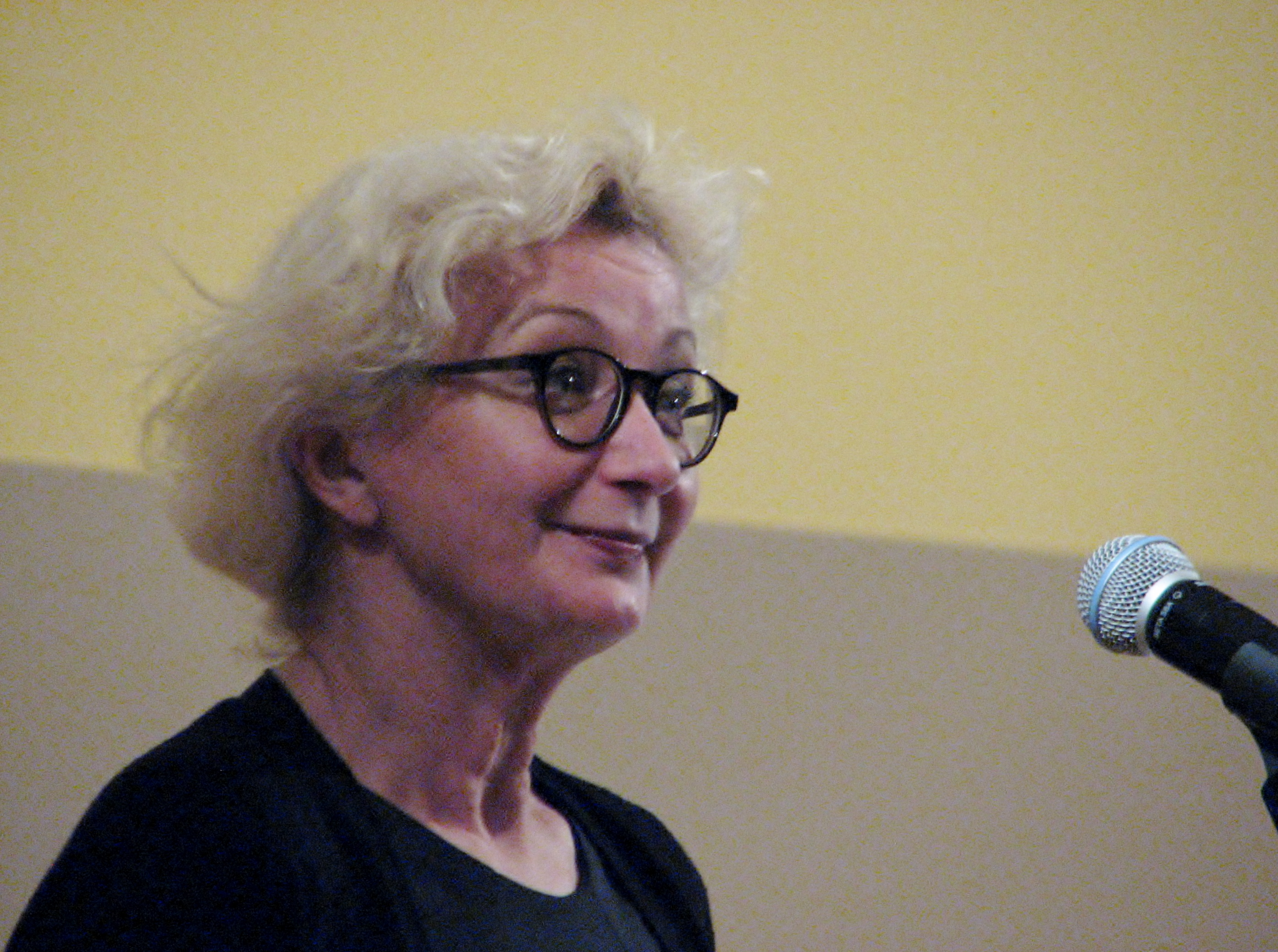
Anu Kalm

Anu Kalm (born 15 January 1960) is an Estonian graphic artist and illustrator.

== Life and career ==
She graduated from Estonian State Art Institute (nowadays Estonian Academy of Arts) in printmaking and illustration.

She teaches at the Tallinn Art School.

She has illustrated over 20 children's books. Twice, she is listed in White Ravens catalogue.

She is married to the architecture historian, Mart Kalm.
