= A. Dakshinamurthy =

Tamil scholar, writer, and translator

Dakshinamurthy Ayyasamy
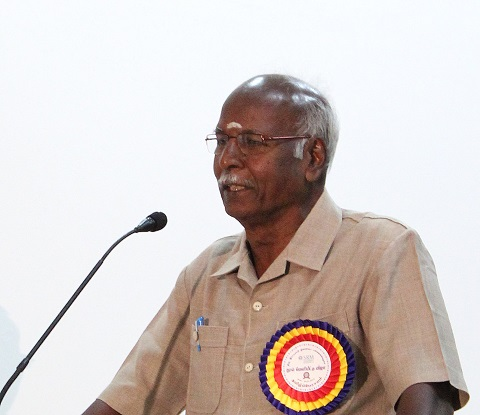
- Born: 1938 (age 87–88); Tamil Nadu, India.
- Education: Madras University, Annamalai University
- Occupations: Tamil professor, translator, writer.
- Writing career
- Language: Tamil, English
- Notable works: Akananuru – The Akam Four Hundred; Kuruntokai – An Anthology of Classical Tamil Poetry; Natrinai Four Hundred; Ancient Tamil classic Pattuppattu in English; Patinenkillanakku – Works on the Akam Theme தமிழர் நாகரிகமும் பண்பாடும்
- Notable awards: Indian President's Tolkappiyar Award (2015); Tamilnadu Government's Bharathidasan Award(2003); Nalli Thisai Ettum Translation Award (2012); Kalaignar Porkili Award (2013); Kolkatta Bharathy Tamil Sangam Outstanding Tamilian Award (2014)
- Website: adakshinamurthy.wordpress.com

Professor A. Dakshinamurthy (born 1938 in Neduvakkottai, Mannargudi Taluk, Thiruvarur district, Tamil Nadu, India) is an eminent Tamil scholar, writer, and an English translator of classical, medieval and modern Tamil literature. He is a pioneer in the field of translation of Classical Tamil works. He is best known for his complete and faithful English translations of 19 ancient classical Tamil literature for the very first time in history between the period of 1999-2012. The Government of India honored him with the Presidential Award for lifetime achievement in Classical Tamil, 'The Tolkappiyar Award' for the year 2015.

== Career ==
Topics in Tamil literature
Sangam Literature
Five Great Epics
Silappatikaram	Manimekalai
Civaka Cintamani	Valayapathi
Kundalakesi
Five Minor Epics
Neelakesi	Culamani
Naga Kumara Kaviyam	Udayana Kumara Kaviyam
Yashodhara Kaviyam
Bhakti Literature
Naalayira Divya Prabandham	Kamba Ramayanam
Tevaram	Tirumurai
Tamil people
Sangam	Sangam landscape
Tamil history from Sangam literature	Ancient Tamil music
Religion in ancient Tamilakam

Dakshinamurthy became interested in Tamil studies under Tamil scholars including T. P. Meenakshisundaran and Mahavidwan S. Dhandapani Desikar.

He started his career in 1962 at V. S. Boys High school, Thiruvarur. Since then, he has served in many institutions like the A. V. C College, Mayiladuthurai, A. V. V. M Sri Pushpam college, Poondi and the Madurai Tamil Sangam, Madurai.

His first publication was a scholarly book in the Tamil language entitled, Tamilar Nagarikamum Panpadum (Tamil: தமிழர் நாகரிகமும் பண்பாடும்). It pointed out all aspects of Tamil culture, civilization and development from the ancient Sangam period to the contemporary age. The work has remained popular since its publication in 1973 and has been reprinted several times.

His Ph. D dissertation 'Sanga Ilakkiyangal Unarthum Manitha Uravugal'(1997), which was published as a book in 2001 deals elaborately with all the kinships between men and women, rulers and the ruled, parents and children, masters and servants, crowned kings and the chiefs, patrons and bards including poets, individuals and the society, based on cultural anthropology.

His first translation work, "The Poems of Bharathidasan – A Translation", was recognized and honored by the government of Tamil Nadu during the centenary celebrations of the poet in 1991 and inspired him to start working in the field of translation. His first major translation work was the Sangam literature Akananuru in 1999, which is the first full translation of all the 400 poems of the literature.

His translation of the Sangam anthology Natrinai (2001), is the first faithful translation of the classic. He gave the second complete translation of the Sangam work Kuruntokai in 2007, after 31 years since the first work by the duo M. Shanmugham Pillai and David Luden appeared in 1976. He gave the second complete translation of all the ten books belonging to the Pattuppaattu collection in 2012, after a wide gap of 66 years since the first translation by J. V. Chellaih appeared in 1946. Six books from the Patinenkilkanakku division published in 2010, are the first and the only complete translations of the classics available.

He is the editor of the volume “Pattuppattu—Text, Transliteration, Translations in English Verse and Prose” published by the Central Institute of Classical Tamil.

He has written several scholarly research articles on language, literature, history, culture, place names, personal names and the art of translation. He has established in his research that among the early Tamil society, cross cousin marriage was the order and love between a girl and a boy drawn from two different geographical regions was not treated in the Sangam classics; he has proved that the word “நும் (Num)” was derived from “நிம் (Nim)”, an idea which is in contrast to Tholkappiyam which says "நும் (Num)" is the source for the word “நீயிர் (Neeyir)”; he has established that the one lettered words, ‘ஆ (Aa), மா (Maa), பா (Paa), நீ (Nee), etc., were once two lettered and in course of time had lost the final nasal consonant which are a few noteworthy findings.

Having served as a teacher for 33 years in various institutions in Tamil Nadu, he retired in 1996 as the principal of the Senthamizh Arts College, Madurai Tamil Sangam, Madurai.

== Accomplishments ==
- He has translated 13 of the 18 Sangam Classics belonging to Patiṉeṇmēlkaṇakku division and 6 books belonging to the Patiṉeṇkīḻkaṇakku division.
- He gave the first complete translation of the Sangam anthology Akananuru and the six Akam books belonging to the Patinenkilkanakku division.
- He is also a pioneer in propagating the works of poet Bharathidasan through translation. He has the credit of translating, seven works of poet Bharathidasan all for the first time.
- He has authored several Tamil books on the history and culture of Tamil Nadu.
- He is the author of two books of commentaries to Sangam classics.

== Translations ==
=== Classical Tamil literature ===
"Akananuru – The Akam four hundred" published in three volumes by the Bharathidasan University, Thiruchirappalli, 1999, (first complete translation of Akananuru).

"The Narrinai Four Hundred", International Institute of Tamil Studies, Chennai, 2001.

“Kurunthokai – An Anthology of Classical Tamil Poetry”, a complete translation of Kurunthokai, Vetrichelvi Publishers, Thanjavur, 2007.

“Patinenkilkkanakku – Works on the Akam Theme”, a translation of 6 books from the Patinenkilkanakku collection, Bharathidasan University, Tiruchirapalli, 2010.

1. Kar Narpathu
2. Ainthinai Aimpathu
3. Ainthinai Ezhupathu
4. Thinaimozhi Aimpathu
5. Thinaimalai Nurru Aimpathu
6. Kainnilai

"Ancient Tamil Classic Pattuppattu In English (The Ten Tamil Idylls)", Thamizh Academy SRM Institute of Science and Technology, Kattankulattur, 2013.

1. Tirumurukāṟṟuppaṭai
2. Porunarāṟṟuppaṭai
3. Ciṟupāṇāṟṟuppaṭai
4. Perumpāṇāṟṟuppaṭai
5. Mullaippāṭṭu
6. Maturaikkāñci
7. Neṭunalvāṭai
8. Kuṟiñcippāṭṭu
9. Paṭṭiṉappālai
10. Malaipaṭukaṭām

=== Tamil medieval literature ===
1. The Neethivenba, The Scholar Miscellanist, Thanjavur, 2002.
2. The Perumal Thirumozhi of Saint Kulasekara Alwar, Senthamizh, Madurai Tamil Sangam, Madurai, 1996.
3. The Abhirami Anthathi of Saint Abhirami Pattar, Senthamizh, Madurai Tamil Sangam, Madurai, 1996.

=== Tamil Modern literature ===
He is one of the very few scholars who have contributed to the propagation of Bharathidasan's works through translation.

1. Kamban – A New Perspective (Kamban Oru Puthiya Paarvai by A S Gnanasampanthan), Sahitya Akademi, New Delhi, 2013.
2. The Bubbles on the Sea (Kadal mel Kumizhikal), Bharathidasan University, 2006.
3. The Dagger of a Tamil Woman (Thamizhachiyin Kathi), Bharathidasan University, 2006.
4. Love or Duty (Kaadhala Kadamaya), Bharathidasan University, 2006.
5. The Poems of Bharathidasan – A Translation (Sanjeevi Paruvathin Saaral, Puratchi Kavi, Vetrichelvi Publishers, Thanjavur, 1990; Revised Second Edition: Two Major Works of Bharathidasan, New Century Book House, 2020.
6. The Darkened home (Irunda Veedu), The Scholar Miscellanist, 2001.
7. The Good Judgement (Nalla Theerpu), The Scholar Miscellanist, 2005.
8. The Bharathy Sixty Six, The Scholar Miscellanist, Thanjavur, April – August 2005, Revised second edition: Paattu Thiraththaalae, Bharathiyar University, Coimbatore, 2021
9. Bharathidasan – Selected Poems (contributor), Pondicherry Institute of Linguistics and Culture, Pondicherry, 1996.

== Editor ==
."Pattuppattu – Text, Transliteration and Translation in English Verse and Prose" Central Institute of Classical Tamil, Chennai, 2021.

== Books written in Tamil ==
1. தமிழர் நாகரிகமும் பண்பாடும் (Tamizhar Nagarikamum Panpadum – History of Tamil Nadu and Culture), Vetrichelvi Publishers, Thanjavur, 1973.
2. சங்க இலக்கியங்கள் உணர்த்தும் மனித உறவுகள் (Sanga Ilakiyangal Unarthum Manitha Uravugal – Human Relations as revealed by the Sangam Works), Mangayarkarasi Pathippakam, Thanjavur, 2001.
3. தமிழியற் சிந்தனைகள் (Thamizhiyal Chinthanaigal – Essays on Tamilology), Akal Publishers, Chennai, 2003.
4. சங்க இலக்கியம் மூலமும் உரையும் – ஐங்குறுநூறு (Sangam literature – Ainkurunooru commentaries in 2 Volumes), New Century Book House, Chennai, 2004.
5. பரிபாடல் மூலமும் உரையும் (Paripadal commentary, Co-author) – New Century Book House, Chennai, 2004.
6. பெயரும் பின்னணியும் (Peyarum Pinnaniyum), Ayya Nilayam, Thanjavur, 2019
7. திணைப்புலவரும் தெய்வப்புலவரும் (Tinaip Pulavarum Deivap Pulavarum), Ayya Nilayam, Thanjavur, 2019

== Awards, honours and tributes ==
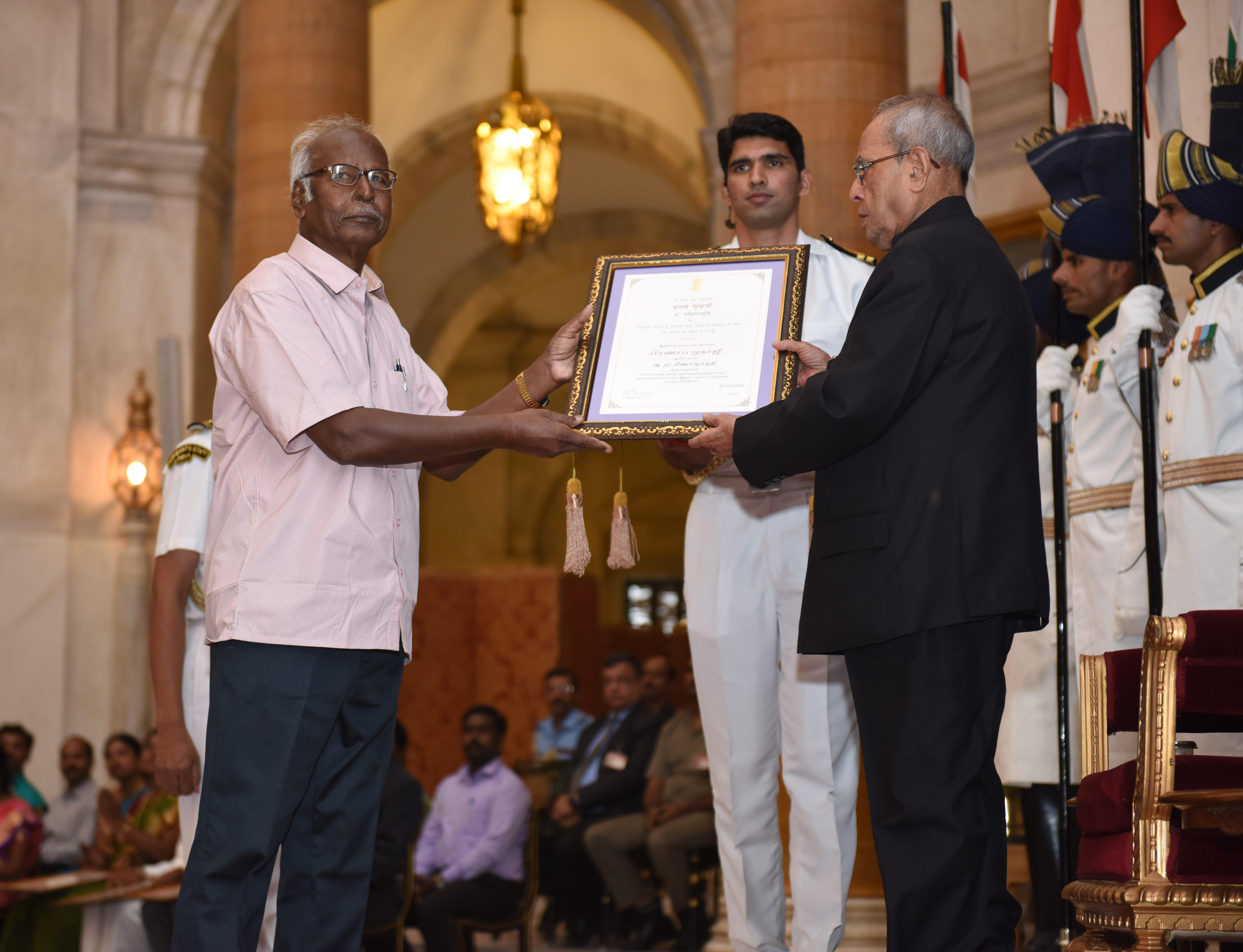
The President of India Pranab Mukherjee honoring Dakshinamurthy with the Presidential Award for Lifetime Achievement in Classical Tamil, the 'Tolkappiyar Viruthu' for the year 2015, (9 May 2017, Rashtrapati Bhavan, New Delhi).

1. Bharathidasan Noolasiriyar certificate of merit by the Government of Tamil Nadu for the book, "Poems of Bharathidasan – A translation", during the poet's centenary celebration in 1991.
2. Bharathidasan Award for the year 2003, by the Government of Tamil Nadu.
3. Vallal Pandiththurai Thevar Award for the year 2003, by Ramanathapuram Tamizh Sangam.
4. Senior Citizen Award for the year 2006, by Rajarajan Educational and Cultural Society, Chennai.
5. Haridhwaramangalam V.Gopalsamy Regunatha Rajaliyar Award for the year 2011, by Rajaliyar Endowment, Haridhwaramangalam.
6. Thiru.V.Ka Award for the year 2012, by the Tamizhisai Academy, Thanjavur, for lifetime services to Tamil.
7. Nalli Thisai Ettum Virudhu for translating Kuruntokai into English, 2012, Chennai.
8. Kalaignar Porkili Award for the year 2013, during the World Book Day celebrations organised by BAPASI (Bookseller's And Publishers' Association of South India) on 23 April 2013.
9. Semmozhi Kural Award, 2014, Lakshmi Chandrasekaran Memorial Endowment, ‘Natpu’ Service Association and Thozhil Thozhan, Thanjavur.
10. Sadhanai Thamizhar Award (Outstanding Tamilian Award) for Lifetime Achievement, 2014, Kolkata Bharathi Tamil Sangam, Kolkata, West Bengal.
11. Mozhipeyarppu Semmal for service to Tamil through translation, 2015, Uzhigal Social Welfare Association, Mupperum Vizha, Thanjavur.
12. Ilakkiya Aalumai for distinguished service to Tamil, 2015, Tamilnadu Kalai Ilakkiya Perumandram, 11th State Conference, Mannargudi.
13. Na. Mu. Venkatasamy Nattar Award for distinguished service to Tamil, 2016, Karanthai Tamil Sangam & Thiruvayaru Tamil Aiyya Kalvik Kazhagam, Karanthai.
14. G. U. Pope Translation Award for “Pattuppattu In English - The Ten Tamil Idylls”, 2017, Thamizh Academy, SRM University, Kattankulathur, Chennai.
15. Indian Presidential Award - Tolkappiyar Award for lifetime achievement in Classical Tamil, 2014-2015, Central Institute of Classical Tamil, Government of India.

== See also ==
- List of translators into English
