= Tamil books of Law =

Historical Tamil moral guidelines

Tamil books of law (Tamil: தமிழ் நீதி நூல்கள், Tamiḻ nīti nūlkaḷ) or the more correct, Classical Tamil phrase (Tamil: தமிழற நூற்கள், Tamiḻaṟa nūṟkaḷ), are didactic Tamil works aimed to promote discipline (ஒழுக்கம்) among people. They were composed with intent to propound moral guidelines, often without specific religious affiliation, hence, many consider them to be secular. They are comparable to the dharmashastra of the Vedic culture.

== Late Sangam period ==
- Tirukkuṛaḷ (or the Kural)

== Post Sangam period ==
- Nālaṭiyār
- Nāṉmaṇikkaṭikai
- Iṉṉā Nāṟpatu
- Iṉiyavai Nāṟpatu, Forty Sweet things
- Tirikaṭukam, Three Medications
- Ācārakkōvai
- Paḻamoḻi Nāṉūṟu, Four-Hundred Sayings
- Ciṟupañcamūlam, Minor Origin of the Five
- Elāti
- Mutumoḻikkānci

== Middle ages ==
- Aruṉkalaceppu
- Aṟanericcāram, Chapter of Good Ethics
- Naṟuttokai, Anthology of Goodness
- Nītineṟiviḷakkam, Explanation of Laws and Morals
- Nanneṟi, Good Ethics
- Ulakanīti. Universal Law
- Mutumoḻi Veṉpā The Venpa of Wise language
- Āticūṭi, Classic of the Orchid
- Konṟai Vēntan, Lord of the Golden Shower
- Mūturai, Counsel of the wise
- Nalvaḻi, Good path

== Modern ==
- Putiya Āticūṭi, New Āticūṭi
- Neṟicūṭi, Classic of Ethics
- Tamiḻcūṭi, Classic of Tamil
- Nīticūṭi, Classic of Law
- Nīticintāmaṉi, Thought gem of Law
- Poṉmatimālai
- Nītinūl, Book of Law
- Nītipētam
- Vivēkacintāmaṉi, Thought gem of wisdom
