= Religion in ancient Tamilakam =

The Sangam period and post sangam period in Tamilakam (c. 300 BCE– 600 CE) was characterized by the coexistence of many denominations and religions: Vaishnavism, Shaivism, Jainism, Ajivika and later joined by Buddhism alongside the folk religion of the Tamil people. The monarchs of the time practiced religious tolerance and openly encouraged religious discussions and invited teachers of every sect to the public halls to preach their doctrines. Hinduism, Jainism, and Buddhism were the three major religions that prevailed in the Tamil region predating the Common Era, as early as the Sangam period.

== Early religious practices in the Tamil country ==
A Neolithic cattle-herding culture existed in South India several millennia prior to the Common Era. By the fifth century, a relatively well-developed culture had emerged. It is described in vivid details in early Tamil texts such as the Tholkappiyam (2nd century BCE) and by the Sangam poets—an "academy" of poets whose poems are primarily dated to the early common era with few poems dated to the 1st century BCE.

Ancient Tamil grammatical works such as the Tholkappiyam and poetic works like the Ten Idylls (Pathuppāṭṭu), and the Eight Anthologies (Eṭṭuttokai) sheds light on early religion of ancient Tamil people. Thirumal was glorified in almost all Sangam literature and was the only god who has the status paramporul. Thirumal was the Supreme God for the Tamilians in Sangam age. According to Kamil Zvelebil, Vishnu was considered ageless (the god who stays for ever) and the supreme god of Tamils where as Skanda was considered young and a personal god of the Tamils. Murugan was glorified as, the red god seated on the blue peacock, who is ever young and resplendent. Early iconography of Murugan and Thirumal and their association with native flora and fauna goes back to Indus Valley Civilization. There are two temples in Tamil Nadu dating to the pre-Pallava era, dedicated to Lord Vishnu and lord Muruga. The temples are Veetrirundha Perumal Temple and Murugan Temple, Saluvankuppam. This shows that these two gods were the most worshiped gods by the Sangam era people. The Sangam landscape was classified into five categories thinais based on the mood, the season and the land. Tolkappiyam mentions that each of these thinai had an associated deity such as Maayon in Mullai—the forests, who was considered supreme, Seyyon in Kurinji—the hills, Kotravai in Pālai—the deserts, Ventan/Senon in Marutham—the plains and Varunan/Kadalon in Neithal—the coasts and the seas.

The cult of the mother goddess is treated as an indication of a society which venerated femininity. This mother goddess was conceived as a virgin, one who has given birth to all and one. The temples of the Sangam days, mainly of Madurai, seem to have had priestesses to the deity, which also appear predominantly a goddess. In the Sangam literature, there is an elaborate description of the rites performed by the Kurava priestess in the shrine Palamutircholai.

== Supreme God ==
Paripadal mentions Perumal as the supreme deity of the world. Mayon is indicated to be the deity associated with the mullai tiṇai (pastoral landscape) in the Tolkappiyam. He is regarded to be the only deity who enjoyed the status of Paramporul (achieving oneness with Paramatma) during the Sangam age. He is also known as Māyavan, Māmiyon, Netiyōn, and Māl in Sangam literature.

Example:-

Paripāṭal i :Line 50 to 56

ஐந்தலை உயிரிய அணங்குடை அருந்திறல் மைந்துடை ஒருவனும்– you are the one with five heads who causes great fear and is one of great ability and strength – Sivan, மடங்கலும்நீ – one where all lives end, நலம் முழுது அளைஇய – with all benefits, புகர்அறு காட்சிப் புலமும்– faultless learning – Vēdās, பூவனும் – you are Brahman who appeared on a flower, நாற்றமும்நீ – you are creation created by Brahman, வலன் உயர் எழிலியும் – clouds that rise up with strength, மாக விசும்பும் – wide sky, நிலனும்– land, நீடிய இமயமும்– and the tall Himalayas, நீ– you, அதனால் – so, இன்னோர் அனையை– like so and so, இனையையால்– like somebody, என– thus, அன்னோர் – those, யாம் இவண் காணாமையின் – I have not seen here, பொன் அணி நேமி – wheels decorated with gold, வலம் கொண்டு ஏந்திய – lifting on your right side or lifting with strength, மன்னுயிர் முதல்வனை – you are supreme to lives on earth.

== Veriyattam ==
"Veriyattam" refers to spirit possession of women, who took part in priestly functions. Under the influence of the god, women sang and danced, but also read the dim past, predicted the future, diagnosed diseases. Twenty two poets of the Sangam age in as many as 40 poems portray Veriyatal. Velan is a reporter and prophet endowed with supernatural powers. Veriyatal had been performed by men as well as women.

== Nadukkal ==
Among the early Tamils the practice of erecting hero stones (nadukkal) had appeared, and it continued for quite a long time after the Sangam age, down to about 11th century. It was customary for people who sought victory in war to worship these hero stones to bless them with victory.

== Theyyam ==
Theyyam is a ritual shaman dance popular in Kerala and parts of Karnataka. Theyyam migrates into the artist who has assumed the spirit and it is a belief that the god or goddess comes in the midst of fathering through the medium of possessed dancer. The dancer throws rice on the audience and distributes turmeric powder as symbols of blessing. Theyyam incorporates dance, mime and music and enshrines the rudiments of ancient tribal cultures which attached great importance to the worship of heroes and the spirits of ancestors, is a socio-religious ceremony. There are over 400 Theyyams performed. The most spectacular ones are those of Raktha Chamundi, Kari Chamundi, Muchilottu Bhagavathi, Wayanadu Kulaven, Gulikan and Pottan. These are performed in front of shrines, sans stage or curtains.

The layout of villages can be assumed to be standard across most villages. An Amman (mother goddess) is at the centre of the villages while a male guardian deity (Tamil: காவல் கடவுள், kāval kaṭavuḷ) has a shrine at the village borders.

== Pre-Sangam and Sangam age ==
Throughout Tamil Nadu, a king was considered to be divine by nature and possessed religious significance. The King was 'the representative of God on earth' and lived in a koyil, which means the "residence of the king". The Modern Tamil word for temple is koil (Tamil: கோயில்). Titular worship was also given to Kings.

Words meaning 'King', like kō (Tamil: கோ "King"), iṟai (இறை "The One Above All") and āṇḍavan (ஆண்டவன் "Conqueror") now primarily refer to Gods. Mōcikīraṉār in the Purananuru says:

Not rice, not water,
only the King is the life-breath
of a kingdom.

The Kingdom suffered by famine or disorder when the King erred. These elements were incorporated later into Hinduism like the legendary marriage of Sivan (Sokkanathar, in this avatar) to Queen Meenatchi who ruled Madurai or Vendhan, also known as Indra. Tolkappiyar refers to the Three Crowned Kings as the "Three Glorified by Heaven", (Tamil: வான்புகழ் மூவர், Vāṉpukaḻ Mūvar). In the Dravidian-speaking South, the concept of divine kingship led to the assumption of major roles by state and temple.

== Middle ages ==
At the birth of Raja Raja Chola I, the Thiruvalangadu inscription states, "Having noticed by the marks (on his body) that Arulmozhi was the very Thirumal, the protector of the three worlds, descended on earth..." During the Bhakti movement, poets often compared gods to kings.

== Hinduism ==
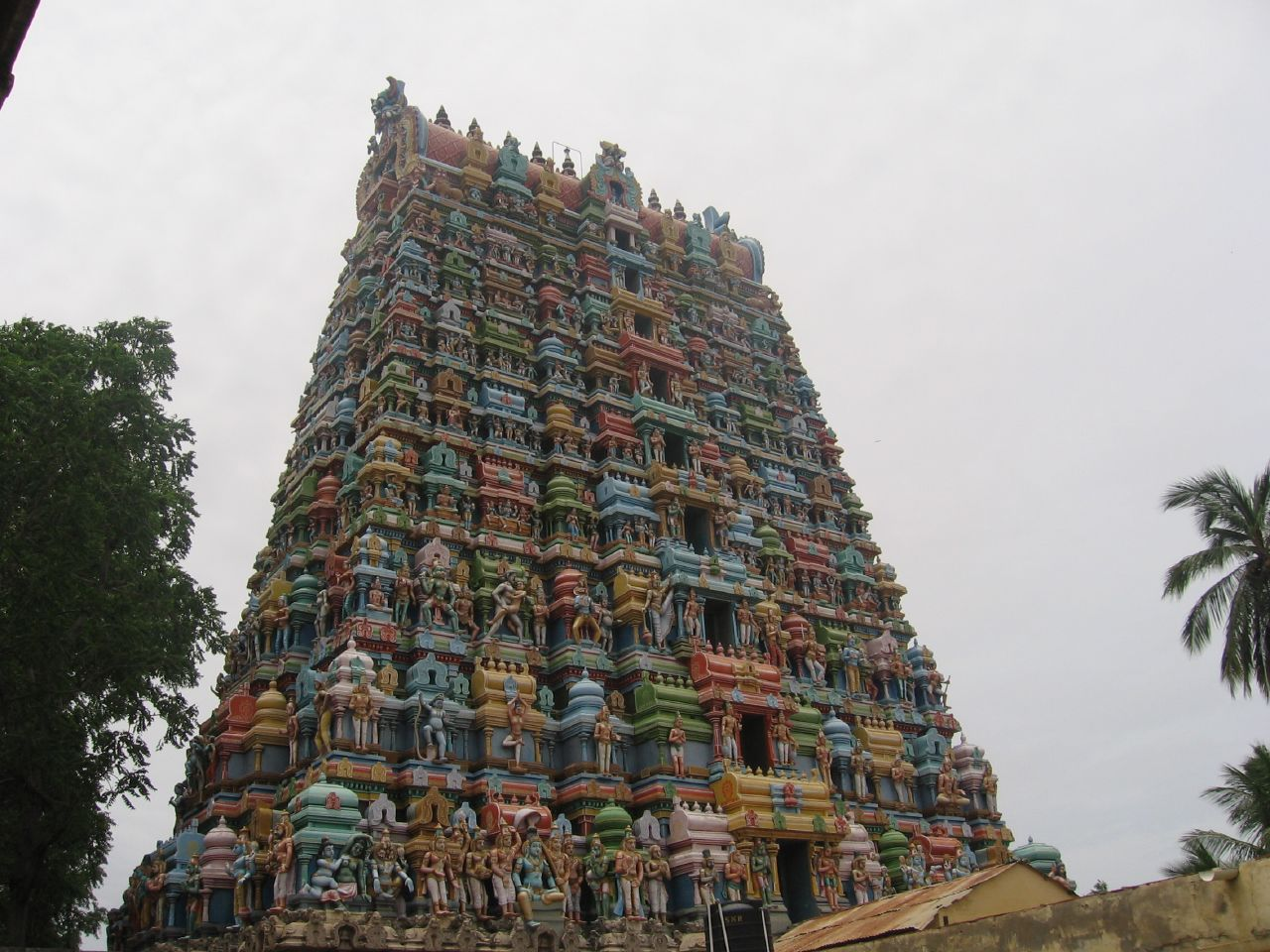
Srivaikuntanathan Perumal temple at Srivaikuntham one of the 108 Divya Desams close to Adichanallur and Mentioned in Brahmanda Purana dating 400 BCE.

Hinduism in Tamil Nadu finds its earliest literary mention in the Sangam literature as early as the 5th century BCE. The Tolkappiyam, possibly the most ancient of the extant Sangam works, dated between the 3rd century BCE and 5th century CE, glorified Perumal as, the favoured god of the Tamils.

The Veetrirundha Perumal Temple was built on top of an older brick temple some of whose remains have survived. The remains constitute one of the two surviving Hindu temples of the pre-Pallava period, the other being the Murugan temple at Saluvankuppam, and one of the oldest ones in Tamil Nadu.

The brick temple excavated in 2005 dates to the Sangam period and is speculated to be the oldest temple to be found in Tamil Nadu. The temple faces north, unlike most Hindu temples which face either east or west, Even though the Veetrirundha Perumal Temple faces East . This shows that Vishnu and Murugan were the most worshiped gods in Ancient Tamil Nadu.

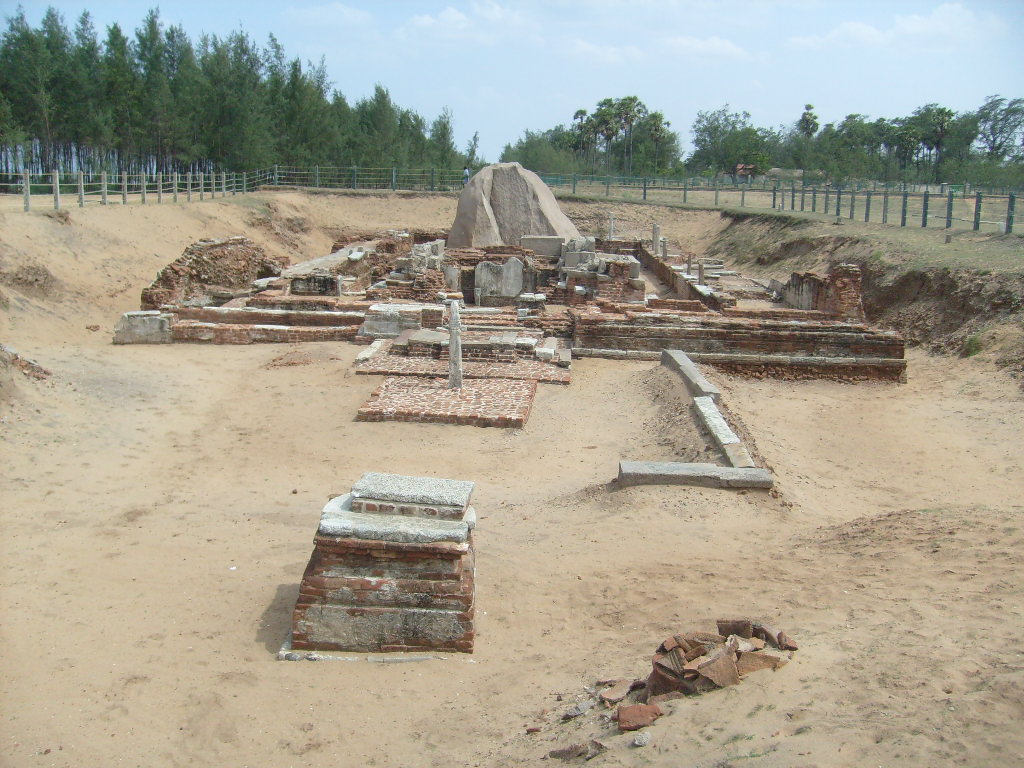
The Murugan temple at Salavanakuppam near Mahabalipuram

During the Sangam period, Perumal, Indra, Varuna, Murugan, and Kotravai were some of the popular deities. The poetic division of the landscape into five regions also associated each region with its own patron deity. The people of the pastoral lands or the Mullai regions worshipped Thirumal. The Marutham people worshipped Vendhan, while the Neithal people considered Kadalon to be their patron deity and the Palai people worshipped Korravai.

The temples of the Sangam age were built out of perishable materials such as plaster, timber and brick, which is why little trace of them is found today. The only public structures of any historical importance belonging to this age that have survived to this day are the rock-beds hewn out of natural rock formation, that were made for the ascetics. The Silappatikaram and the Sangam poems such as Kaliththokai, Mullaippāṭṭu and Purananuru mention several kinds of temples such as the Puranilaikkottam or the temple at the outskirts of a city, the Netunilaikkottam or the tall temple, the Palkunrakkottam the temple on top of a hill, the Ilavantikaippalli or the temple with a garden and bathing ghat, the Elunilaimatam or a seven storeyed temple, the Katavutkatinakar or the temple city.

== Ajivika ==
Ajivika is an ascetic philosophy and way of life for Tamils. No books available on this philosophy of grace. However, there are countless references to the Ajivika philosophy from Buddhist and Jain theologians and other archeological texts. Ajivika flourished around the 1st century BCE or later. It was considered a rival to Vedic Brahmanism, Jainism, and Buddhism.

There is evidence to suggest that Ajivikas existed in Tamil Nadu. They are known to have had a presence along the Palar river, in regions like Vellore, Kanchipuram, and Tiruvallur districts, until around the 14th century CE. However, due to persecution and the rise of Bhakti movements, Ajivikas eventually assimilated into Vaishnavism.

=== Philosophy ===
==== Absolute determinism and no free will ====
The problems of time and change was one of the main interests of the Ajivikas. Their views on this subject may have been influenced by Vedic sources, such as the hymn to Kala (Time) in Atharvaveda. Both Jaina and Buddhist texts state that Ājīvikas believed in absolute determinism, absence of free will, and called this niyati. Everything in human life and universe, according to Ajivikas, was pre-determined, operating out of cosmic principles, and true choice did not exist. The Buddhist and Jaina sources describe them as strict fatalists, who did not believe in karma. The Ajivikas philosophy held that all things are preordained, and therefore religious or ethical practice has no effect on one's future, and people do things because cosmic principles make them do so, and all that will happen or will exist in future is already predetermined to be that way. No human effort could change this niyati and the karma ethical theory was a fallacy. James Lochtefeld summarizes this aspect of Ajivika belief as, "life and the universe is like a ball of pre-wrapped up string, which unrolls until it was done and then goes no further".

Riepe states that the Ajivikas belief in predeterminism does not mean that they were pessimistic. Rather, just like Calvinists belief in predeterminism in Europe, the Ajivikas were optimists. The Ajivikas simply did not believe in the moral force of action, or in merits or demerits, or in after-life to be affected because of what one does or does not do. Actions had immediate effects in one's current life but without any moral traces, and both the action and the effect was predetermined, according to the Ajivikas.

Makkhali Gosala seems to have combined the ideas of older schools of thought into an eclectic doctrine. He appears to have believed in destiny, nature, and change, and possibly parinama, which may have prompted other philosophical schools to label him variously as ahetuvadin, vainayikavadin, ajnanavadin, and issarakaranavadin. According to him all beings undergo development (parinama). This culminates in the course of time (samsarasuddhi) in final salvation to which all beings are destined under the impact of the factors of destiny, nature, and change. As such destiny does not appear as the only player, but rather chance or indeterminism plays equal part in his doctrine. He thus subscribed to fatalism only in the sense that he thought that some future events like salvation for all were strictly determined.

=== Atomism ===
Ajivikas developed a theory of elements and atoms similar to the Vaisheshika school of Vedic's. Everything was composed of minuscule atoms, according to Ajivikas, and qualities of things are derived from aggregates of atoms, but the aggregation and nature of these atoms was predetermined by cosmic forces.

The description of Ajivikas' atomism is inconsistent between those described in Buddhist and Vedic texts. According to three Tamil texts, the Ajivikas held there exists seven kayas (Sanskrit: काय, assemblage, collection, elemental categories): pruthvi-kaya (earth), apo-kaya (water), tejo-kaya (fire), vayo-kaya (air), sukha (joy), dukkha (sorrow) and jiva (life). The first four relate to matter, the last three non-matter. These elements are akata (that which is neither created nor destroyed), vanjha (barren, that which never multiplies or reproduces) and have an existence independent of the other. The elements, asserts Ajivika theory in the Tamil text Manimekalai, are made of paramanu (atoms), where atoms were defined as that which cannot be further subdivided, that which cannot penetrate another atom, that which is neither created nor destroyed, that which retains its identity by never growing nor expanding nor splitting nor changing, yet that which moves, assembles and combines to form the perceived.

The Tamil text of Ajivikas asserts that this "coming together of atoms can take diversity of forms, such as the dense form of a diamond, or a loose form of a hollow bamboo". Everything one perceives, states the atomism theory of Ajivikas, was mere juxtapositions of atoms of various types, and the combinations occur always in fixed ratios governed by certain cosmic rules, forming skandha (molecules, building blocks). Atoms, asserted the Ajivikas, cannot be seen by themselves in their pure state, but only when they aggregate and form bhutas (objects). They further argued that properties and tendencies are characteristics of the objects. The Ajivikas then proceeded to justify their belief in determinism and "no free will" by stating that everything experienced – sukha (joy), dukkha (sorrow) and jiva (life) – is mere function of atoms operating under cosmic rules.

Riepe states that the details of the Ajivikas theory of atomism provided the foundations of later modified atomism theories found in Jain, Buddhist and Vedic traditions.

=== Antinomian ethics ===
Another doctrine of Ajivikas philosophy, according to Buddhist texts, was their antinomian ethics, that is there exist "no objective moral laws". Buddhaghosa summarizes this view as, "There is neither cause nor basis for the sins of living beings and they become sinful without cause or basis. There is neither cause nor basis for the purity of living beings and they become pure without cause or basis. All beings, all that have breath, all that are born, all that have life, are without power, or strength, or virtue, but are the result of destiny, chance and nature, and they experience joy and sorrow in six classes".

Despite this ascribed premise of antinomian ethics, both Jain and Buddhist records note that Ājīvikas lived a simple ascetic life, without clothes and any material possessions.

Tamil literature on Ajivikas suggests that they practiced Ahimsa (non-violence) and a vegetarian lifestyle. Arthur Basham notes that Buddhist and Jaina texts variously accuse Ajivikas of immorality, unchastity and worldliness, but they also acknowledge the confusion among Buddhists and Jainas when they observed the simple, ascetic lifestyle of Ajivikas.

== Jainism ==
The exact origins of Jainism in Tamil Nadu is unclear. However, Jains flourished in Tamil Nadu at least as early as the Sangam period. Tamil Jain tradition places their origins are much earlier. Some scholars believe that the author of the oldest extant work of literature in Tamil (3rd century BCE), Tolkāppiyam, was a Jain. S. Vaiyapuri Pillai suggests that Tolkappiyar was a Jain scholar well-versed in the Aintiram grammatical system and posits a later date, placing him in southern Kerala around the 5th century CE. Notably, Tolkappiyam incorporates several Sanskrit and Prakrit loanwords, reflecting its historical and linguistic context.

A number of Tamil-Brahmi inscriptions have been found in Tamil Nadu that date from the 2nd century BCE. They are regarded to be associated with Jain monks and lay devotees.

Some scholars consider the Tirukkural by Valluvar to be the work by a Jain. It emphatically supports moral vegetarianism (Chapter 26) and states that giving up animal sacrifice is worth more than a thousand offerings in fire (verse 259).

Silappatikaram, a major work in Tamil literature, was written by a Samaṇa (jain), Ilango Adigal. It describes the historical events of its time and also of the then-prevailing religions, Jainism, Buddhism and Shaivism. The main characters of this work, Kannagi and Kovalan, who have a divine status among Tamils, were Jains.

According to George L. Hart, the legend of the Tamil Sangams or "literary assemblies" was based on the Jain sangham at Madurai:

There was a permanent Jaina assembly called a Sangha established about 604 CE in Maturai. It seems likely that this assembly was the model upon which tradition fabricated the cangkam legend."

Jainism began to decline around the 8th century, with many Tamil kings embracing Hindu religions, especially Shaivism. Still, the Chalukya, Pallava and Pandya dynasties embraced Jainism.

== Buddhism ==
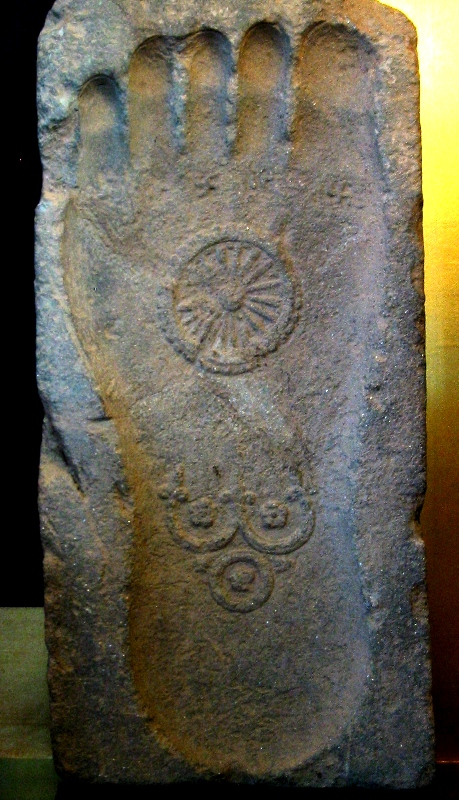
Footprint of Buddha engraved on stone, c. 1st century CE

The heritage of the town of Nākappaṭṭinam is found in the Burmese historical text of the 3rd century BCE and gives evidence of a Budha Vihar built by the King Ashoka. An inscription from Anuradhapura, Sri Lanka dated to 2nd century BCE records the association of Tamil merchants with Buddhist institution.

The Buddhists worshiped the impressions of Buddha’s feet engraved on stone and platforms made of stone that represented his seat. The pious Buddhist walked round them, with his right side towards them and bowed his head as a token of reverence. The Silapatikaram mentions that the monks worshipped Buddha by praising him as the wise, holy and virtuous teacher who adhered to his vows strictly, as the one who subdued anger and all evil passions and as the refuge of all mankind. Manimekalai is a sequel to the Silapathikaram, which tells the story of Buddhism of the daughter of Kovalan and Madhavi.

In the Buddhist Viharas or monasteries, learned monks preached their sermons, seated in a place which was entirely concealed from the view of the audience. The Buddhists did not observe the distinctions of caste and invited all ranks to assemble on a footing of equality. Self-control, wisdom and charity were among the virtues preached and practiced by the monks, who were numerous in the ancient Tamil country.

== Christianity ==
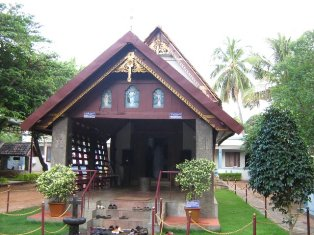
Thiruvithamcode Arappally, believed to be built by Thomas the Apostle, was patronised by the Chera king, Udayancheral.

Christianity was believed to have been introduced in India by St. Thomas the Apostle who landed at Muziris on Malabar Coast in the year 52 CE. These ancient Christians are today known as Saint Thomas Christians or Syriac Christians or Nasrani. They are now divided into different denominations namely, Syro-Malabar Catholic, Syro-Malankara Catholic, Malankara Orthodox, Jacobite and Malankara Marthoma. Syriac Christians followed the same rules of caste and population as that of Hindus and sometimes they were even considered as population neutralizers. They tend to be endogamous, and tend not to intermarry even with other Christian groupings. Saint Thomas Christians derive status within the caste system from the tradition that they were elites, who were evangelized by St. Thomas. Also, internal mobility is allowed among these Saint Thomas Christian sects and the caste status is kept even if the sect allegiance is switched (for example, from Syriac Orthodox to Syro-Malabar Catholic). Despite the sectarian differences, Syriac Christians share a common social status within the Caste system of Kerala and are considered as Forward Caste.

== Judaism ==
The traditional account is that traders from Judea arrived in the city of Cochin, Kerala in 562 BCE, and that more Jews came as exiles from Israel in the year 70 CE after the destruction of the Second Temple. The distinct Jewish community was called Anjuvannam. The still-functioning synagogue in Mattancherry belongs to the Paradesi Jews, the descendants of Sephardim that were expelled from Spain in 1492.

== Philosophies of religion ==
=== Secularism ===
The secular identity of the Sangam literature is often celebrated to represent the tolerance among Tamil people. In his book History of Tamil language and literature: beginning to 1000 A. D., Vaiyapuri Pillai concludes, "Thus the Tamil land became a fertile nursery and the several religions... throve in friendly rivalry." Most scholars agree that the lack of 'god' should not be inferred to be atheistic. The Tamil books of Law, particularly the Tirukkural, is considered as the Perennial philosophy of Tamil culture because of its universalisability.

=== Ūzh and Vinai ===
Ūzh meaning 'fate' or 'destiny' and vinai meaning 'works' concerns the ancient Tamil belief of differentiating what man can do and what is destined.

=== Iṟaivaṉ and Iyavuḷ ===
Sangam Tamil people understood two distinct characteristics of Godhood. God who is beyond all (Tamil: இறைவன், Iṟaivaṉ) and the God who sets things in motion (Tamil: இயவுள், Iyavuḷ).

== See also ==
- Religion in Tamil Nadu
- Sangam period
- Sangam landscape
- Village deities of Tamils of Sri Lanka
- Village deities of Tamil Nadu
- Spirituality & the Tamil Nation
