= Eighteen Lesser Texts =

Collection of 18 poetic works

The Eighteen Lesser Texts, known as the Patiṉeṇkīḻkaṇakku (Tamil: பதினெண்கீழ்கணக்கு) in the literature, is a collection of eighteen poetic works mostly created during the 'post Sangam period' (between 100 and 500 CE). The poems of this collection differ from the earlier works of the Eighteen Greater Texts (Patiṉeṇmēlkaṇakku), which are the oldest surviving Tamil poetry, in that the poems are written in the venpa meter and are relatively short in length. Naladiyar, having sung by 400 poets, is the only anthology in this collection. Each of the remaining works of the Eighteen Lesser Texts is sung by a single poet. Unlike the works of the Eighteen Greater Texts, most of the books of the Eighteen Lesser Texts deal with morals and ethics.

== Works of the "Eighteen lesser books" collection ==
The Eighteen Lesser Texts contains the following books:

- Nālaṭiyār
- Nāṉmaṇikkaṭikai
- Iṉṉā Nāṟpatu
- Iṉiyavai Nāṟpatu
- Kār Nāṟpatu
- Kaḷavaḻi Nāṟpatu
- Aintiṇai Aimpatu
- Tiṉaimoḻi Aimpatu
- Aintinai Eḻupatu
- Tiṉaimalai Nūṟṟu Aimpatu
- Tirukkuṛaḷ
- Tirikaṭukam
- Ācārakkōvai
- Paḻamoḻi Nāṉūṟu
- Ciṟupañcamūlam
- Mutumoḻikkānci
- Elāti
- Kainnilai

== See also ==
- Eighteen Greater Texts
- Sangam literature
- List of historic Indian texts
