= Tiṉaimoḻi Aimpatu =

Tamil poetic work

Tiṉaimozhi Aimpatu (Tamil: திணைமொழி ஐம்பது) is a Tamil poetic work belonging to the Eighteen Lesser Texts (Pathinenkilkanakku) anthology of Tamil literature. This belongs to the 'post Sangam period' corresponding to between 100 and 500 CE. Tiṉaimozhi Aimpatu contains fifty poems written by the poet Kannan Chenthanaar.

The poems of Tiṉaimoḻi Aimpatu deal with agam (internal) subjects. Agam in the Sangam literature denotes the subject matters that deal with the intangibles of life such as human emotions, love, separation, lovers' quarrels, etc. The poems of Tiṉaimozhi Aimpatu are categorised into ten poems for each of the five thinai, or landscape of Sangam poetry and describe in detail the situation and emotions specific to each landscape. The five landscapes of Sangam poetry are mullai – forest, kurinji – mountains, marutham – farmland, paalai – arid land and neithal – seashore.
