= Paḻamoḻi Nāṉūṟu =

Tamil poetic work

Paḻamoḻi Nāṉūṟu (Tamil: பழமொழி நானூறு) is a Tamil poetic work of didactic nature belonging to the Eighteen Lesser Texts (Pathinenkilkanakku) anthology of Tamil literature. This belongs to the 'post Sangam period' corresponding to between 100 and 500 CE. Paḻamoḻi Nāṉūṟu contains 400 poems written by the poet Munrurai Araiyanaar, a Jain. The poems of Paḻamoḻi Nāṉūṟu are written in the Venpa meter.

Paḻamoḻi Nāṉūṟu employs old Tamil proverbs to illustrate its messages. The following poem uses the adage that it is impossible to straighten the tail of a dog, as it impossible to control the unchaste mind of a girl by throwing her in prison.

நிறையான் மிகுகலா நேரிழை யாரைச்
சிறையான் அகப்படுத்தல் ஆகா - அறையோ
வருந்த வலிதினின் யாப்பினும் நாய்வால்
திருந்துதல் என்றுமே இல்.

== See also ==
- Tamil Jain
