= Kaḷavaḻi Nāṟpatu =

Tamil poetic work

Kalavazhi Narpathu (Tamil: களவழி நாற்பது) is a Tamil poetic work belonging to the Eighteen Lesser Texts (Pathinenkilkanakku) anthology of Tamil literature. This belongs to the 'post Sangam period' corresponding to between 100 and 500 CE. Kalavazhi Narpathu contains forty poems written by the poet Poigayaar.

The poems of Kalavazhi Narpathu deal with the puram (external) subjects. Puram in the Sangam literature denotes the subject matters that deal with war, politics, wealth, and so forth.
