= Nāṉmaṇikkaṭikai =

Tamil poetic work

Nāṉmaṇikkaṭikai (Tamil: நான்மணிக்கடிகை) is a Tamil poetic work of didactic nature belonging to the Eighteen Lesser Texts (Patiṉeṇkīḻkaṇakku) anthology of Tamil literature. This belongs to the 'post Sangam period corresponding to between 100 and 500 CE. Nanmanikkatigai contains one hundred songs written by probably the Tamil Jain poet Vilambi Nayanaar. This poetic work is famous for its clarity and easy readability and is often a prescribed text for schools in Tamil Nadu. The poems of Nanmanikkatigai are written in the Venpa meter.

The poems of Nāṉmaṇikkaṭikai each contain four different ideas. The name Nāṉmaṇikkaṭikai denotes this fact comparing the four ideas to four well-chosen gems adorning each poem. The following poem describes four different groups of people who cannot sleep well at night, namely, a thief, a lovelorn person, someone who hankers after money and a person who wishes to guard his wealth:

கள்வம்என் பார்க்குந் துயில் இல்லை, காதலிமாட்டு
உள்ளம்வைப்பார்க்கும் துயில் இல்லை, ஒண்பொருள்
செய்வம்என் பார்க்கும் துயில் இல்லை, அப்பொருள்
காப்பார்க்கும் இல்லை துயில்.
