= Tirikaṭukam =

Tamil poetic work

Thirikatukam (Tamil: திரிகடுகம்) is a Tamil poetic work of didactic nature belonging to the Eighteen Lesser Texts (Pathinenkilkanakku) anthology of Tamil literature. This belongs to the 'post Sangam period' corresponding to between 100 and 500 CE. Thirikatukam contains 100 poems written by the poet Nallathanaar. The poems of Thirikatukam are written in the Venpa meter.

Thirikatukam uses the analogy of the traditional herbal medicine, which uses the three herbs sukku (dried ginger), milaku (pepper) and thippili (Long pepper) to cure maladies of the stomach. Thirikatugam similarly uses three different maxims to illustrate correct behaviour.
