= Ciṟupañcamūlam =

Tamil poetic work

Ciṟupañcamūlam (Siruppanchamulam) (Tamil: சிறுபஞ்சமூலம்) is a Tamil poetic work of didactic nature belonging to the Eighteen Lesser Texts (Pathinenkilkanakku) anthology of Tamil literature. This belongs to the 'post Sangam period' corresponding to between 100 and 500 CE. Siruppanchamulam contains 100 poems written by the poet Kariyaasaan. He was probably a Jain by religious persuasion. This and the fact that he was a student of one Makkayanaar is known from the introductory poem of this book. The poems of Siruppanchamulam are written in the Venpa meter.

Siruppanchamulam uses the analogy of the traditional herbal medicine, which uses the roots of the five herbs kandankatthiri (a plant of the nightshade family – Solanum xanthocarpum), siruvzhuthunai, sirumalli, perumalli, and nerunji (a thorny prostrate plant – Tribulus terrestris) to cure certain maladies. Siruppanchamulam similarly uses five different maxims to illustrate correct behaviour.

The following poem lists the five things, namely, a chaste girl, the humility of the learned, friendly neighbouring countries, benevolent kings under whose reign there are timely rains and loyal assistants as sweet as ambrosia.

கற்புடைய பெண் அமிர்து, கற்று அடங்கினான் அமிர்து
நற்புடைய நாடுஅமிர்து - நற்புடைய
மேகமே சேர்கொடி வேந்து அமிர்து, சேவகனும்
ஆகவே செய்யின் அமிர்து.

== See also ==
- Tamil Jain
