= Iṉiyavai Nāṟpatu =

Classic Tamil poetic work

Iniyavai Narpathu (Tamil: இனியவை நாற்பது, romanized: Iṉiyavai Nāṟpatu, lit. 'The Forty Desirable Things') a classic Tamil poetic work of didactic nature belonging to the Eighteen Lesser Texts (Pathinenkilkanakku) anthology of Tamil literature. This belongs to the post Sangam period corresponding to between 100 and 500 CE. Iniyavai Narpathu is a collection of 40 poems written by the poet Putham Sernthanar describing the most desirable things in life. The poems of Iniyavai Narpathu are written in the Venpa meter.

This collection is very similar to Inna Narpathu, which deals with the forty things one should avoid. Iniyavai Narpathu includes four categories of things one should seek in life: learning even at the expense of begging, the advice of learned persons, healthy children, strength to not covet other's spouse.

Iniyavai Narpathu, together with Inna Narpathu spells out in simple and succinct terms moral codes essential for daily life of the individual and for the society. They both emphasise the importance of education and individual responsibility in society.
