= Kainnilai =

Tamil poetic work

Kainnilai (Tamil: கைந்நிலை) and Innilai (Tamil: இன்னிலை) are Tamil poetic works belonging to the Eighteen Lesser Texts (Pathinenkilkanakku) anthology of Tamil literature. These two books together form the eighteenth book in the anthology, belonging to the 'post Sangam period' corresponding to between 100 and 500 CE. Kainnilai contains sixty poems written by the poet Pullangkaathanaar(புல்லங்காட) and Innilai contains 45 poems and was written by the poet Poigayaar(பொய்கையார).

The poems of Innilai deal with the ethical concepts of aram – propriety, porul – wealth, inpam – love and veedu – salvation. In this respect it is similar to Tirukkural which also concerns with these concepts.

Kainnilai is available in a much-damaged condition with many of its poems only partially available. Kainnilai deals with the subjective (agam) concepts. Agam in the Sangam literature denotes the subject matters that deal with the intangibles of life such as human emotions, love, separation, lovers' quarrels, etc. The poems of Kainnilai are categoriesed into twelve poems for each of the five thinai, or landscape of Sangam poetry and describe in detail the situation and emotions specific to each landscape. The five landscapes of Sangam poetry are mullai – forest, kurinji – mountains, marutham – farmland, paalai – arid land and neithal – seashore.
