= Aintinai Eḻupatu =

Tamil poetic work

Aintinai Eḻupatu (Tamil: ஐந்திணை எழுபது), is a Tamil poetic work belonging to the Eighteen Lesser Texts (Patiṉeṇkīḻkaṇakku) anthology of Tamil literature, belonging to the post-Sangam period corresponding to between 100 and 500 CE. Aintinai Eḻupatu contains seventy poems written by the Tamil Jain poet Muvathiyaar.

The poems of Aintinai Eḻupatu deals with the subjective (agam) concepts. Agam in the Sangam literature denotes the subject matters that deal with the intangibles of life such as human emotions, love, separation, lovers' quarrels, etc. The poems of Aintinai Eḻupatu are categorised into fourteen poems for each of the five thinai, or landscape of Sangam poetry and describe in detail the situation and emotions specific to each landscape. The five landscapes of Sangam poetry are mullai – forest, kurinji – mountains, marutham – farmland, paalai – arid land and neithal – seashore.
