= Aintiṇai Aimpatu =

Tamil poetic work

Ainthinai Aimpathu (Tamil: ஐந்திணை ஐம்பது) is a Tamil poetic work belonging to the Eighteen Lesser Texts (Patiṉeṇkīḻkaṇakku) anthology of Tamil literature. This belongs to the 'post Sangam period' corresponding to 100–500 CE. Ainthinai Aimpathu contains fifty poems written by the poet Māṟaṉ Poṟaiyaṉār.

The poems of, Ainthinai Aimpathu, deal with the agam (internal) subjects. Agam in the Sangam literature denotes the subject matters that deal with the intangibles of life such as human emotions, love, separation, lovers' quarrels, etc. The poems of Ainthinai Aimpathu are categories into ten poems for each of the five thinai, or landscape of Sangam poetry and describe in detail the situation and emotions specific to each landscape. The five landscapes of Sangam poetry are mullai – forest, kurinji – mountains, marutham – farmland, paalai – arid land and neithal – seashore.
