= Elāti =

Tamil poetic work

Elathi is a Tamil poetic work of didactic nature belonging to the Eighteen Lesser Texts (Pathinenkilkanakku) anthology of Tamil literature. This belongs to the 'post Sangam period' corresponding to between 100 and 500 CE. Elathi contains 80 poems written by the Tamil Jain poet Kani Methaviyar. Kani Methaviyar (also known as Kani Methaiyar), was a devout Jain scholar and poet who lived during the post-Sangam period. He also authored another text in the Pathinenkilkanakku anthology called Thinaimalai Nutraimbathu. The poems of Elathi are written in the Venpa meter.

Elathi uses the analogy of the traditional herbal medicine known as elathi which uses six herbs such as elam (cardamom), ilavanka pattai (cinnamon), naagakesaram (made from the stamens of the Ceylon ironwood), milagu (black pepper), thippili (long pepper), and sukku (dried ginger). Elathi similarly uses six different maxims to illustrate correct behaviour. It tells about six values of every aspect of life in every poem in four lines. The following poem lists the six things, namely, fame, wealth, praise, courage, education and philanthropy that add beauty to those who follow the scriptures.

சென்றபுகழ், செல்வம், மீக்கூற்றம், சேவகம்
நின்றநிலை, கல்வி, வள்ளன்மை - என்றும்/
அளிவந்தார் பூங்குழலாய் ஆறும் மறையின்/ வழிவந்தார் கண்ணே வனப்பு
"Fame, wealth, praise, courage, education, munificence - forever/AAlivantar flowershide rivers/Follower, comes Beauty that evokes the evil eye, Beauty"
