= Tiṇaimālai Nūṟṟaimpatu =

Tamil poetic work by the poet Kanimeytaviyar

Tiṇaimālai Nūṟṟaimpatu (Tamil: திணைமாலை நூற்றைம்பது) is a Tamil poetic work belonging to the Eighteen Lesser Texts (Patinenkilkanakku) anthology of Tamil literature, belonging to the 'post Sangam period' corresponding to between 100 and 500 CE. Tiṇaimālai Nūṟṟaimpatu contains 154 poems written by the Tamil Jain poet Kanimeytaviyar.

The poems of Tiṇaimālai Nūṟṟaimpatu deals with the subjective (agam) concepts. Agam in the Sangam literature denotes the subject matters that deal with the intangibles of life such as human emotions, love, separation, lovers' quarrels, etc. The poems of Tiṇaimālai Nūṟṟaimpatu are categorised into 31 poems for each of the five tinai, or landscape of Sangam poetry and describe in detail the situation and emotions specific to each landscape. The five landscapes of Sangam poetry are mullai – forest, kurinji – mountains, marutam – farmland, palai – arid land and neital – seashore.

Kaņimētāviyār also wrote another text within the same Patinenkilkanakku anthology called Ēlāthi. Unlike Tiņaimālai Nūrraimpatu, Ēlāthi is a didactic moral text that explicitly propagates core Jain virtues, such as non-violence (Ahimsa), asceticism, and right conduct.
