= Mutumoḻikkānci =

Tamil poetic work

Muthumozhikkanchi (Tamil: முதுமொழிக்காஞ்சி) is a Tamil poetic work of didactic nature belonging to the Eighteen Lesser Texts (Pathinenkilkanakku) anthology of Tamil literature. This belongs to the 'post Sangam period' corresponding to between 100 and 500 CE. Muthumozhikkanchi contains 100 poems written by the poet Mathuraikkoodalaar Kilaar who must have lived in Madurai.

The poems of Muthumozhikkanchi are divided into ten groups of ten poems each and employs simple poetic style to enable the lay person to understand the messages. All the poems start with the same phrase - ஆர்கலி உலகத்து மக்கட் கெல்லாம் ("For all the people of this world") as a preface and the rest of the first line qualifies the characteristic dealt by the rest of the ten lines of the section.

In the following poem, the excellence (சிறந்தன்று) of righteous behaviour and chastity are found in the second and third lines:

ஆர்கலி உலகத்து மக்கட் கெல்லாம்
ஓதலில் சிறந்தன்று ஒழுக்கம் உடைமை,
காதலில் சிறந்த ன்று கண் அஞ்சப்படுதல்.
