= Sangam literature =

Historic period of Tamil literature

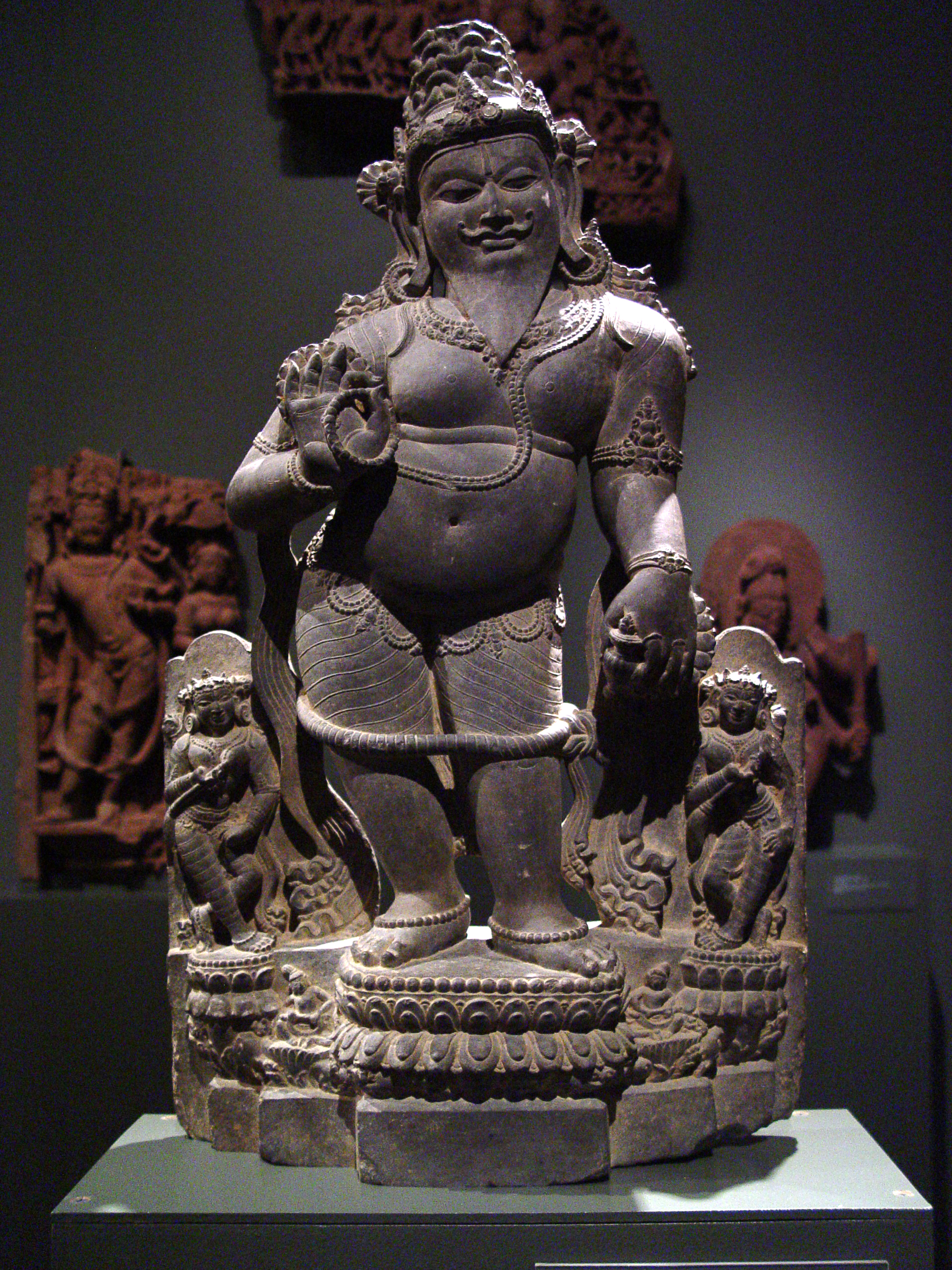
Sculpture of the ancient Tamil Siddhar Agastyar who is traditionally believed to have chaired the first Tamil Sangam in Madurai

The Sangam literature (Tamil: சங்க இலக்கியம், caṅka ilakkiyam), historically known as the Poetry of the Noble Ones (Tamil: சான்றோர் செய்யுள், Cāṉṟōr ceyyuḷ), connotes the early classical Tamil literature and is the earliest known literature of South India. The Tamil tradition and legends link it to three legendary literary gatherings around Madurai and Kapāṭapuram: the first lasted over 4,440 years, the second over 3,700 years, and the third over 1,850 years. Scholars consider this Tamil tradition-based chronology as ahistorical and mythical. Most scholars suggest the historical Sangam literature era, also called the Sangam period, spanned from c. 300 BCE to 300 CE, while others variously place this early classical Tamil literature period a bit later and more narrowly but all before 300 CE. According to Kamil Zvelebil, a Tamil literature and history scholar, the most acceptable range for the Sangam literature is 100 BCE to 250 CE, based on the linguistic, prosodic and quasi-historic allusions within the texts and the colophons.

The Sangam literature had fallen into oblivion for much of the second millennium of the common era, but were preserved by and rediscovered in the monasteries of Hinduism, by colonial-era scholars in the late nineteenth century. The rediscovered Sangam classical collection is largely a bardic corpus. It comprises an Urtext of oldest surviving Tamil grammar (Tolkappiyam), the Ettuttokai anthology (the "Eight Collections"), the Pathuppaattu anthology (the "Ten Songs"). The Tamil literature that followed the Sangam period – that is, after c. 250 CE but before c. 600 CE – is generally called the "post-Sangam" literature.

This collection contains 2381 poems in Tamil composed by 473 poets, some 102 anonymous. Of these, 16 poets account for about 50% of the known Sangam literature, with Kapilar – the most prolific poet – alone contributing just little less than 10% of the entire corpus. These poems vary between 3 and 782 lines long. The bardic poetry of the Sangam era is largely about love (akam) and war (puram), with the exception of the shorter poems such as in Paripaatal which is more religious and praise Vishnu and Murugan.

== Legendary Tamil Sangams ==
Sangam literally means "gathering, meeting, fraternity, academy". According to David Shulman, a scholar of Tamil language and literature, the Tamil tradition believes that the Sangam literature arose in distant antiquity over three periods, each stretching over many millennia. The first has roots in the Hindu deity Shiva, his son Murugan, Kubera as well as 545 sages including the famed Rigvedic poet Agastya. The first academy, states the legend, extended over four millennia and was located far to the south of modern city of Madurai, a location later "swallowed up by the sea", states Shulman. The second academy, also chaired by a very long-lived Agastya, was near the eastern seaside Kapāṭapuram and lasted three millennia. This was swallowed by floods. From the second Sangam, states the legend, the Akattiyam and the Tolkāppiyam survived and guided the third Sangam scholars.

A prose commentary by Nakkiranar – likely about the eighth century CE – describes this legend. The earliest known mention of the Sangam legend, however, appears in Tirupputtur Tantakam by Appar in about the seventh century CE, while an extended version appears in the twelfth-century Tiruvilaiyatal puranam by Perumparrap Nampi. The legend states that the third Sangam of 449 poet scholars worked over 1,850 years in northern Madurai (Pandyan kingdom). He lists six anthologies of Tamil poems (later a part of Ettuttokai):

- Netuntokai nanuru (400 long poems)
- Kuruntokai anuru (400 short poems)
- Narrinai (400 Tinai landscape poems)
- Purananuru (400 Outer poems)
- Ainkurunuru (500 very short poems)
- Patirruppattu (Ten Tens)

These claims of the Sangams and the description of sunken land masses Kumari Kandam have been dismissed as frivolous by historiographers. Noted historians like Kamil Zvelebil have stressed that the use of 'Sangam literature' to describe this corpus of literature is a misnomer and Classical literature should be used instead. According to Shulman, "there is not the slightest shred of evidence that any such [Sangam] literary academies ever existed", though there are many Pandya inscriptions that mention an academy of scholars. Of particular note, states Shulman, is the tenth-century CE Sinnamanur inscription that mentions a Pandyan king who sponsored the "translation of the Mahabharata into Tamil" and established a "Madhurapuri (Madurai) Sangam". (Note: This is, however, not the first inscription to support the sangam legend. According to Eva Wilden, the first inscription to hint the existence of a "sangam" legend is found in the Erukkankuti plates of 829 CE. A part of this inscription says, "the lord of excellent Alankuti that is praised in the worlds, on the firm big bench of stone in Kutal [Maturai] with cool Tamil great in words". While the context and the last part about Kutal echoes the existence of a Tamil scholar academy in Madurai, it does not presuppose or confirm the existence of a full-fledged three sangam periods legend by the ninth century CE, states Wilden.)

According to Zvelebil, within the myth there is a kernel of reality, and all literary evidence leads one to conclude that "such an academy did exist in Madurai (Maturai) at the beginning of the Christian era". The homogeneity of the prosody, language and themes in these poems confirms that the Sangam literature was a community effort, a "group poetry". (Note: According to Zvelebil, the hypothesis proposed by some that the first and second academy may have referred to the Buddhist and Jaina monk assemblies can "hardly" be true. Rather, states Zvelebil, it is more likely that the first academy of poets existed sometime about 400–300 BCE – which he adds, is also a "purely speculative" conjecture. The persistence of three gods – Siva, Murukavel [Murugan] and Kubera – in the legendary account and the classical Tamil literature, states Zvelebil, suggests that the beginnings of Tamil literature and civilization were "closely connected with the cults" of these three gods in ancient Tamil Nadu.) The Sangam literature is also referred sometimes with terms such as caṅka ilakkiyam or "Sangam age poetry".

== Historical Sangam period ==
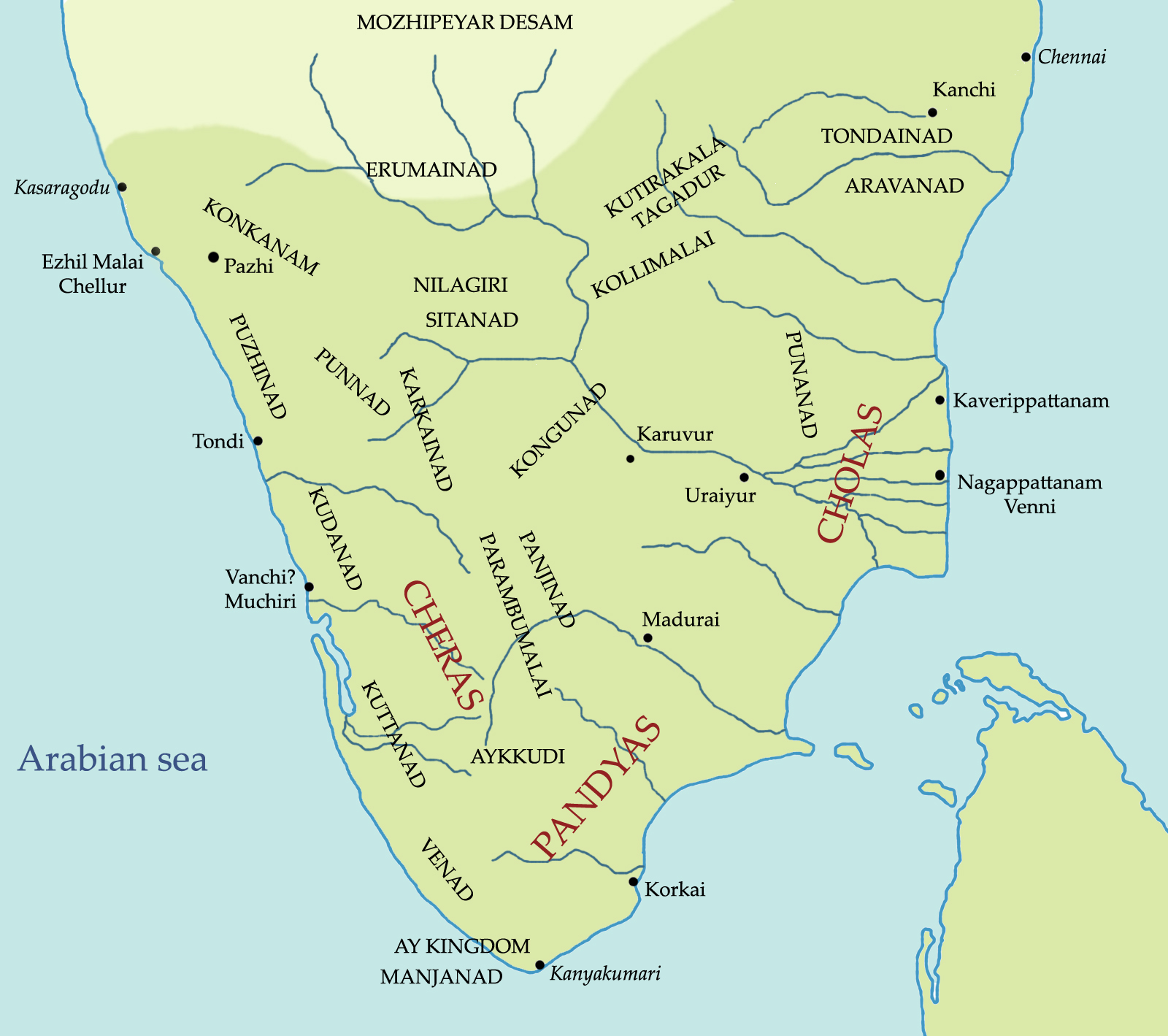
South India in Sangam period

In Old Tamil language, the term Tamilakam (Tamiḻakam, Purananuru 168. 18) referred to the whole of the ancient Tamil-speaking area, corresponding roughly to the area known as southern India today, consisting of the territories of the present-day Indian states of Tamil Nadu, Kerala, parts of Andhra Pradesh and Karnataka. Sri Lanka is distinguished from it and is known as Ilam or Eelam, although also influenced by the Sangam period. (Note: Wilson 2000, p. 14: "They had earlier felt secure in the concept of the Tamilakam, a vast area of "Tamilness" from the south of Dekhan in India to the north of Sri Lanka...")

In Indian history, the Sangam period or age (Tamil: சங்ககாலம், caṅkakālam) is the period of the history of ancient Tamil Nadu and Kerala (then known as Tamilakam), and parts of Sri Lanka from c. 300 BCE to 300 CE. It was named after the literature of poets and scholars of the legendary Sangam academies centered in the city of Madurai.

In the period between 300 BCE and 300 CE, Tamilakam was ruled by the three Tamil dynasties of Pandya, Chola and Chera, and a few independent chieftains, the Velir. The evidence on the early history of the Tamil kingdoms consists of the epigraphs of the region, the Sangam literature, and archaeological data.

== Corpus ==
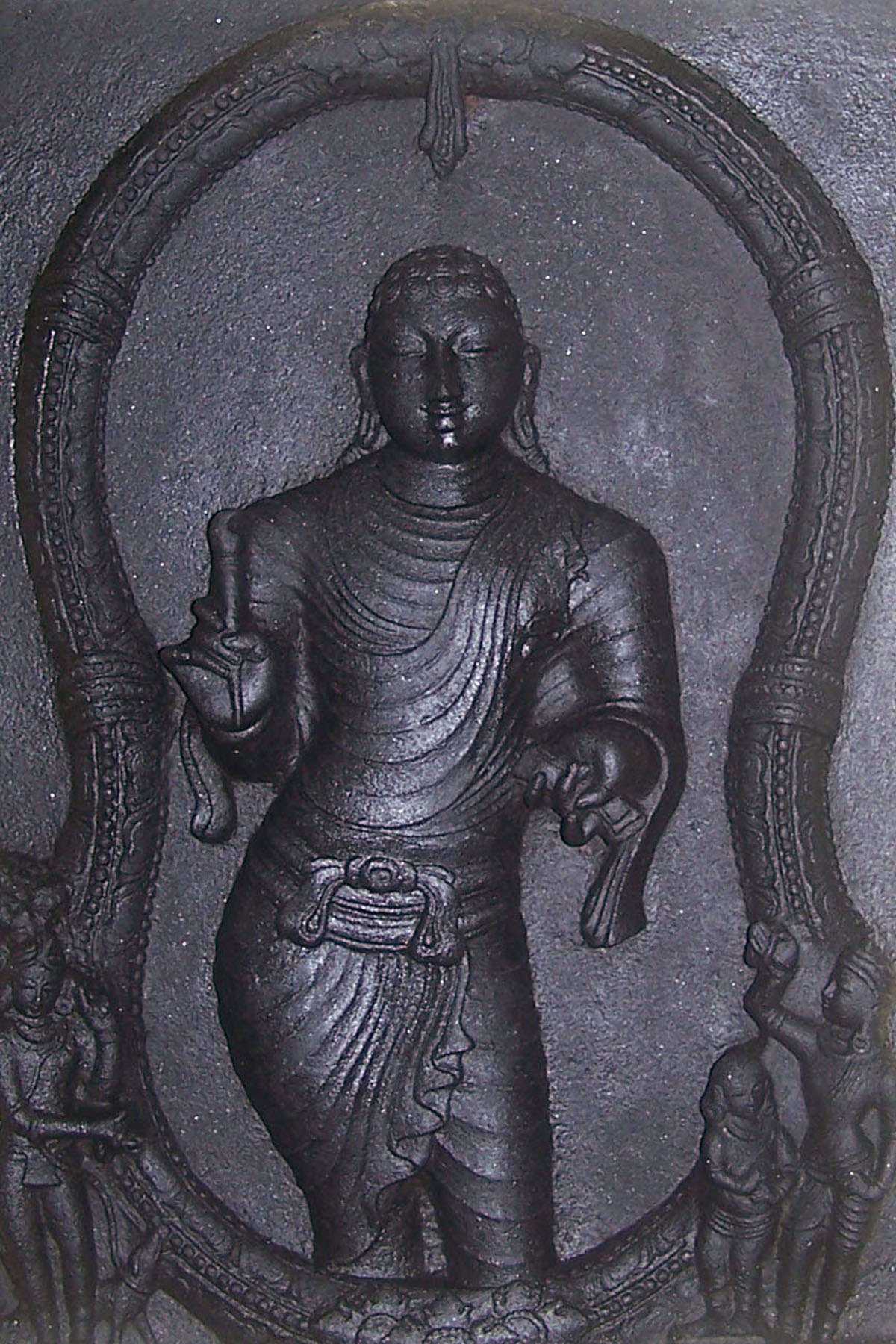
Ilango Adigal is the author of Silappatikaram, one of the five great epics of Tamil literature.

=== Authors ===
The Sangam literature was composed by 473 poets, some 102 anonymous. According to Nilakanta Sastri, the poets came from diverse backgrounds: some were from a royal family, some merchants, some farmers. At least 27 of the poets were women. These poets emerged, states Nilakanta Sastri, in a milieu where the Tamil society had already interacted and inseparably amalgamated with north Indians (Indo-Aryan) and both sides had shared mythology, values and literary conventions.

=== Compilations ===
The available literature from this period was categorised and compiled in the tenth century CE into two categories based roughly on chronology. The categories are the Patiṉeṇmēlkaṇakku ("Eighteen Greater Texts") comprising Ettuthogai (or Ettuttokai, "Eight Anthologies") and the Pattuppāṭṭu ("Ten Idylls") and Patiṉeṇkīḻkaṇakku ("Eighteen Lesser Texts"). According to Takanobu Takahashi, the compilation of Patiṉeṇmēlkaṇakku poems are as follows:

Ettuttokai
Name	Extant poems	Original poems	Lines in poems	Number of poets
Natrrinai	400	400	9–12	175
Kuruntokai	402	400	4–8	205
Ainkurunuru	499	500	3–6	5
Patirruppattu	86	10x10	varies	8
Paripatal	33	70	varies	13
Kalittokai	150	150	varies	5
Akananuru	401	400	12–31	145
Purananuru	398	400	varies	157

Pattuppattu
Name	Lines	Author
Tirumurukarruppatai	317	Nakkirar
Porunararruppatai	234	Mutattamakkanniyar
Cirupanarruppatai	296	Nattattanar
Perumpanarruppatai	500	Uruttirankannaiyar
Mullaippattu	103	Napputanar
Maturaikkanci	782	Mankuti Marutanar
Netunalvatai	188	Nakkirar
Kurincippattu	261	Kapilar
Pattinappalai	301	Uruttirankannanar
Malaipatukatam	583	Perunkaucikanar

The compilation of poems from Patiṉeṇkīḻkaṇakku are as follows:

- Nālaṭiyār
- Nāṉmaṇikkaṭikai
- Iṉṉā Nāṟpatu
- Iṉiyavai Nāṟpatu
- Kār Nāṟpatu
- Kaḷavaḻi Nāṟpatu
- Aintiṇai Aimpatu
- Tiṉaimoḻi Aimpatu
- Aintinai Eḻupatu
- Tiṉaimalai Nūṟṟu Aimpatu
- Tirukkuṛaḷ
- Tirikaṭukam
- Ācārakkōvai
- Paḻamoḻi Nāṉūṟu
- Ciṟupañcamūlam
- Mutumoḻikkānci
- Elāti
- Kainnilai

=== Classification ===
Sangam literature is broadly classified into akam (அகம், inner), and puram (புறம், outer). The akam poetry is about emotions and feelings in the context of romantic love, sexual union and eroticism. The puram poetry is about exploits and heroic deeds in the context of war and public life. Approximately three-fourths of the Sangam poetry is akam themed, and about one fourth is puram.

Sangam literature, both akam and puram, can be subclassified into seven minor genre called tiṇai (திணை). This minor genre is based on the location or landscape in which the poetry is set. These are: kuṟiñci (குறிஞ்சி), mountainous regions; mullai (முல்லை), pastoral forests; marutam (மருதம்), riverine agricultural land; neytal (நெய்தல்) coastal regions; pālai (பாலை) arid. In addition to the landscape based tiṇais, for akam poetry, ain-tinai (well matched, mutual love), kaikkilai (ill matched, one sided), and perunthinai (unsuited, big genre) categories are used. The Ainkurunuru – 500 short poems anthology – is an example of mutual love poetry.

Similar tiṇais pertain to puram poems as well, categories are sometimes based on activity: vetchi (cattle raid), vanchi (invasion, preparation for war), kanchi (tragedy), ulinai (siege), tumpai (battle), vakai (victory), paataan (elegy and praise), karanthai, and pothuviyal. The akam poetry uses metaphors and imagery to set the mood, never uses names of person or places, often leaves the context as well that the community will fill in and understand given their oral tradition. The puram poetry is more direct, uses names and places, states Takanobu Takahashi.

=== Style and prosody ===
The early Sangam poetry diligently follows two meters, while the later Sangam poetry is a bit more diverse. The two meters found in the early poetry are akaval and vanci. The fundamental metrical unit in these is the acai (metreme), itself of two types – ner and nirai. The ner is the stressed/long syllable in European prosody tradition, while the nirai is the unstressed/short syllable combination (pyrrhic (dibrach) and iambic) metrical feet, with similar equivalents in the Sanskrit prosody tradition. The acai in the Sangam poems are combined to form a cir (foot), while the cir are connected to form a talai, while the line is referred to as the ati. The sutras of the Tolkappiyam – particularly after sutra 315 – state the prosody rules, enumerating the 34 component parts of ancient Tamil poetry.

The prosody of an example early Sangam poem is illustrated by Kuruntokai:

ciṟuveḷ ḷaravi ṉavvarik kuruḷai
kāṉa yāṉai aṇaṅki yāaṅ
kiḷaiyaṇ muḷaivā ḷeyiṟṟaḷ
vaḷaiyuṭaik kaiyaḷem maṇaṅki yōḷē
– Kuruntokai 119, Author: Catti Nataanr

The prosodic pattern in this poem follows the 4-4-3-4 feet per line, according to akaval, also called aciriyam, Sangam meter rule:

= – / = – / – = / = –
– – / – – / = – / – –
= – / = – / = –
= = / – = / = – / – –

Note: "=" is a ner, while "–" is a nirai in Tamil terminology.

A literal translation of Kuruntokai 119:

little-white-snake of lovely-striped young-body
jungle elephant troubling like
the young-girl sprouts-brightness toothed-female
bangle(s) possessing hand(s)-female"
– Translator: Kamil Zvelebil

English interpretation and translation of Kuruntokai 119:

As a little white snake
with lovely stripes on its young body
troubles the jungle elephant
this slip of a girl
her teeth like sprouts of new rice
her wrists stacked with bangles
troubles me.
– Creative translator: A.K. Ramanujan (1967)

This metrical pattern, states Zvelebil, gives the Sangam poetry a "wonderful conciseness, terseness, pithiness", then an inner tension that is resolved at the end of the stanza. The metrical patterns within the akaval meter in early Sangam poetry has minor variations. The later Sangam era poems follow the same general meter rules, but sometimes feature 5 lines (4-4-4-3-4). The later Sangam age texts employ other meters as well, such as the Kali meter in Kalittokai and the mixed Paripatal meter in Paripatal.

== Preservation and rediscovery ==
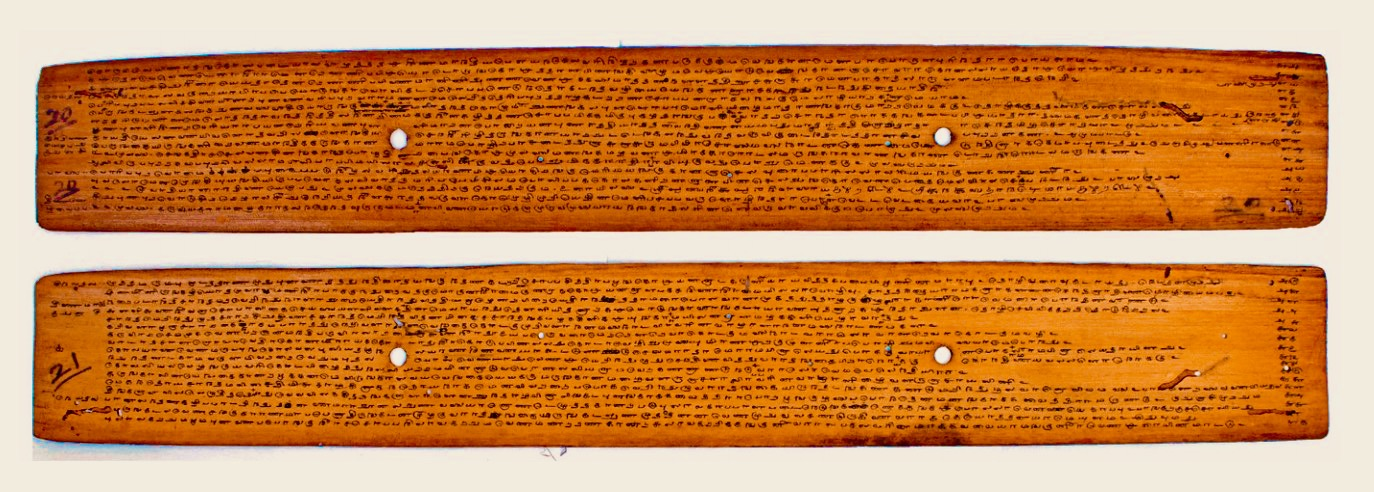
A palm-leaf manuscript (UVSL 589) with 100 folios, handwritten in miniature scripts by Shaiva Hindus. This multi-text manuscript includes many Tamil texts, including the Sangam era Tirumurukāṟṟuppaṭai. The folio languages include mainly Tamil and Sanskrit, with some Telugu; scripts include Tamil, Grantha and Telugu. It is currently preserved in U.V. Swaminatha Aiyar library in Chennai. (Note: The private U.V. Swaminatha Aiyar library preserves the largest collection of Sangam era-related manuscripts. Other notable collections of Sangam literature manuscripts are found in the Saraswati Mahal library and the Tamil University manuscript library in Thanjavur (Tamil Nadu), the Oriental Research Institute and Manuscript library of Thiruvananthapuram (Kerala), as well as the private collections in old Hindu temples and monasteries. Less than 50% of all preserved palm leaf manuscripts, copied over the centuries over nearly 2,000 years, are in the Tamil language; the majority of these manuscripts preserved in Tamil Nadu and Kerala are in Sanskrit and Telugu (some Malayalam). Sangam literature manuscript collections typically include all three languages. A few thousand of the Sangam and post-Sangam era manuscripts in Tamil language are now preserved in various European and American collections.)

The works of Sangam literature were lost and forgotten for most of the 2nd millennium. They were rediscovered by colonial-era scholars such as Arumuka Navalar (1822–1879), C.W. Damodaram Pillai (1832–1901) and U. V. Swaminatha Aiyar (1855–1942).

Arumuka Navalar from Jaffna first inaugurated the modern editions of Tamil classics, publishing a fine edition of Tirukkuṟaḷ by 1860. Navalar – who translated the Bible into Tamil while working as an assistant to a Methodist Christian missionary, chose to defend and popularize Shaiva Hinduism against missionary polemics, in part by bringing ancient Tamil and Shaiva literature to wider attention. He brought the first Sangam text into print in 1851 (Tirumurukāṟṟuppaṭai, one of the Ten Idylls). In 1868, Navalar published an early commentary on Tolkappiyam.

C.W. Damodaram Pillai, also from Jaffna, was the earliest scholar to systematically hunt for long-lost manuscripts and publish them using modern tools of textual criticism. These included:

- Viracoliyam (1881)
- Iraiyanar Akapporul (1883)
- Tolkappiyam-Porulatikaram (1885)
- Kalittokai (1887) - the first of the Eight Anthologies (Eṭṭuttokai).

Aiyar – a Tamil scholar and a Shaiva pundit, in particular, is credited with his discovery of major collections of the Sangam literature in 1883. During his personal visit to the Thiruvavaduthurai Adhinam – a Shaiva matha about twenty kilometers northeast of Kumbhakonam, he reached out to the monastery head Subrahmanya Desikar for access to its large library of preserved manuscripts. Desikar granted Aiyar permission to study and publish any manuscripts he wanted. There, Aiyar discovered a major source of preserved palm-leaf manuscripts of Sangam literature. Aiyar published his first print of the Ten Idylls in 1889.

Together, these scholars printed and published Kalittokai (1887), Tholkappiyam, Nachinarkiniyar Urai (1895), Tholkappiyam Senavariyar urai (1868), Manimekalai (1898), Silappatikaram (1889), Pattuppāṭṭu (1889), Patiṟṟuppattu (1889). Puṟanāṉūṟu (1894), Aiṅkurunūṟu (1903), Kuṟuntokai (1915), Naṟṟiṇai (1915), Paripāṭal (1918) and Akanāṉūṟu (1923) all with scholarly commentaries. They published more than 100 works in all, including minor poems.

== Significance ==
The Sangam literature is the historic evidence of indigenous literary developments in South India in parallel to Sanskrit, and the classical status of the Tamil language. While there is no evidence for the first and second mythical Sangams, the surviving literature attests to a group of scholars centered around the ancient Madurai (Maturai) that shaped the "literary, academic, cultural and linguistic life of ancient Tamil Nadu", states Zvelebil. On their significance, Zvelebil quotes A. K. Ramanujan, "In their antiquity and in their contemporaneity, there is not much else in any Indian literature equal to these quiet and dramatic Tamil poems. In their values and stances, they represent a mature classical poetry: passion is balanced by courtesy, transparency by ironies and nuances of design, impersonality by vivid detail, austerity of line by richness of implication. These poems are not just the earliest evidence of the Tamil genius."

The Sangam literature offers a window into some aspects of the ancient Tamil culture, secular and religious beliefs, and the people. For example, in the Sangam era Ainkurunuru poem 202 is one of the earliest mentions of "pigtail of Brahmin boys". These poems also allude to historical incidents, ancient Tamil kings, the effect of war on loved ones and households. The Pattinappalai poem in the Ten Idylls group, for example, paints a description of the Chola capital, the king Karikalan, the life in a harbor city with ships and merchandise for seafaring trade, the dance troupes, the bards and artists, the worship of the Hindu god Vishnu, Murugan and the monasteries of Buddhism and Jainism. This Sangam era poem remained in the active memory and was significant to the Tamil people centuries later, as evidenced by its mention nearly 1,000 years later in the 11th- and 12th-century inscriptions and literary work.

Sangam literature embeds evidence of loan words from Sanskrit, suggesting on-going linguistic and literary collaboration between ancient Tamil Nadu and other parts of the Indian subcontinent. (Note: This collaboration was two way, and evidence for this is found in the earliest known Hindu scripture, the Rigveda (1500–1200 BCE). About 300 words in the Rigveda are neither Indo-Aryan nor Indo-European, states the Sanskrit and Vedic literature scholar Frits Staal. Of these 300, many – such as kapardin, kumara, kumari, kikata – come from Munda or proto-Munda languages found in the eastern and northeastern (Assamese) region of India, with roots in Austro-Asiatic languages. The others in the list of 300 – such as mleccha and nir – have Dravidian (Tamil, Telugu) roots found in the southern region of India, or are of Tibeto-Burman origins. The linguistic sharing provide clear indications, states Michael Witzel, that the people who spoke Rigvedic Sanskrit already knew and interacted with Munda and Dravidian speakers.) One of the early loan words, for example, is acarya – from Sanskrit for a "spiritual guide or teacher", which in Sangam literature appears as aciriyan (priest, teacher, scholar), aciriyam or akavar or akaval or akavu (a poetic meter). (Note: According to George Hart, other than loan words, it is obvious to any scholar who has studied both classical Sanskrit and classical Tamil that the mid to late Sangam literature (1st to 3rd century CE) and ancient Sanskrit literature are related. However, adds Hart, the earliest layer of the Sangam literature "does not seem to be much influenced by Sanskrit".)

The Sangam poetry focuses on the culture and people. It is religious as well as non-religious, as there are several mentions of the Hindu gods and more substantial mentions of various gods in the shorter poems. The 33 surviving poems of Paripaatal in the "Eight Anthologies" group praises Vishnu, Durga and Murugan. (Note: Other Sangam poems mention gods and goddesses. For example, Purananuru 23, Akananuru 22, Tirumurukarruppatai 83–103 and others mention god Murugan, his wife Valli, the iconographic peacock, and the Vedas; Murugan's mother – goddess Korravai (Amma, Uma, Parvati, Durga) is mentioned in Akananuru 345, Kalittokai 89, Perumpanarruppatai 459 and elsewhere. She is both a mother goddess and the goddess of war and victory in Sangam poetry.) Similarly, the 150 poems of Kalittokai – also from the Eight Anthologies group – mention Krishna, Shiva, Murugan, various Pandava brothers of the Mahabharata, Kama, goddesses such as Ganga, divine characters from classical love stories of India. One of the poems also mentions the "merciful men of Benares", an evidence of interaction between the northern holy city of the Hindus with the Sangam poets. Some of the Paripaatal love poems are set in the context of bathing festivals (Magh Mela) and various Hindu gods. They mention temples and shrines, confirming the significance of such cultural festivals and architectural practices to the Tamil culture.

Religion in the Sangam age was an important reason for the increase in Tamil literature. Ancient Tamils Primarily followed Vaishnavism (who consider Vishnu as the Supreme Deity) and Kaumaram (who worship Murugan as the Supreme god). According to Kamil Zvelebil, Vishnu was considered ageless (The god who stays forever) and the Supreme god of Tamils whereas Skanda was considered young and a personal god of Tamils.

Mayon is indicated to be the deity associated with the mullai tiṇai (pastoral landscape) in the Tolkappiyam. Tolkappiyar mentions Mayon first when he made reference to deities in the different land divisions. The Paripādal (Tamil: பரிபாடல், meaning the paripadal-metre anthology) is a classical Tamil poetic work and traditionally the fifth of the Eight Anthologies (Ettuthokai) in the Sangam literature. According to Tolkappiyam, Paripadal is a kind of verse dealing only with love (akapporul) and does not fall under the general classification of verses. Sangam literature (200 BCE to 500 CE) mentions Mayon or the "dark one", as the Supreme deity who creates, sustains, and destroys the universe and was worshipped in the Plains and mountains of Tamilakam.The Earliest verses of Paripadal describe the glory of Perumal in the most poetic of terms. Many Poems of the Paripadal consider Perumal as the Supreme god of Tamils. He is regarded to be the only deity who enjoyed the status of Paramporul (achieving oneness with Paramatma) during the Sangam age. He is also known as Māyavan, Māmiyon, Netiyōn, and Māl in Sangam literature and considered as the most mentioned god in the Sangam literature.

Cēyōṉ "the red one", who is identified with Murugan, whose name is literally Murukaṉ "the youth" in the Tolkāppiyam; Extant Sangam literature works, dated between the third century BCE and the fifth century CE glorified Murugan, "the red god seated on the blue peacock, who is ever young and resplendent", as "the favoured god of the Tamils". There are no mentions of Shaivism in Tolkappiyam. Shiva and Brahma are said to be forms Of Maha Vishnu and considers Vishnu as The Supreme god in Paripāṭal.

There are two poems depicted as example of Bhakti in Ancient Tamil Nadu, one in the praise of Maha Vishnu and other of Murugan

To Tirumal (Maha Vishnu):

தீயினுள் தெறல் நீ;
பூவினுள் நாற்றம் நீ;
கல்லினுள் மணியும் நீ;
சொல்லினுள் வாய்மை நீ;
அறத்தினுள் அன்பு நீ;
மறத்தினுள் மைந்து நீ;
வேதத்து மறை நீ;
பூதத்து முதலும் நீ;
வெஞ் சுடர் ஒளியும் நீ;
திங்களுள் அளியும் நீ;
அனைத்தும் நீ;
அனைத்தின் உட்பொருளும் நீ;

— Paripadal, iii: 63-68
Translation:

In fire, you are the heat;
in blossoms, the fragrance;
among the stones, you are the diamond;
in speech, truth;
among virtues, you are love;
in valour—strength;
in the Veda, you are the secret;
among elements, the primordial;
in the burning sun, the light;
in moonshine, its sweetness;
you are all,
and you are the substance and meaning of all.

— F Gros, K Zvelebil

To Seyyon (Skandha):

We pray you not for wealth,
not for gold, not for pleasure;
But for your grace, for love, for virtue,
these three,
O god with the rich garland of kaṭampu flowers
with rolling clusters!

– Pari. v.: 78–81

The other gods also referred to in the Tolkappiyam are Vēntaṉ "the sovereign" (identified with Indra) and Korravai "the victorious" (identified with Durga) and Varunan "the sea god".

The Sangam literature also emphasized fair governance by kings, who were often described as Sengol-valavan, the king who established just rule; the king was warned by priests that royal injustice would lead to divine punishment; and the handing over of a royal scepter, the Sengol, denoting a decree to rule fairly, finds mention in texts such as the Purananooru, Kurunthogai, Perumpaanatrupadai, and Kalithogai.

Further, the colophons of the Paripaatal poems mention music and tune, signifying the development and the importance of musical arts in ancient Tamil Nadu. According to Zvelebil, these poems were likely from the late Sangam era (2nd or 3rd century CE) and attest to a sophisticated and prosperous ancient civilization.

== Modern musical renditions ==
The first music album on Tamil Sangam poetry titled Sandham: Symphony Meets Classical Tamil by composer Raleigh Rajan in collaboration with Durham Symphony, featured in Amazon's Top#10 'International Music albums' category in July 2020 and was called "A Major event in the world of Music" by The Hindu Music review.

Sangam poems are often quoted and paraphrased in modern Tamil cinema.

== See also ==
- Project Madurai: open access Tamil literature repository
- List of historic Indian texts
- Tamiḻakam
- First Sangam
- Second Sangam
- Tamil Sangams
- List of Sangam poets
- Vaishnavism in Ancient Tamilakam

== Sources ==
- Anjali (2017). Social and Cultural History of Ancient India. Lucknow: OnlineGatha—The Endless Tale. ISBN 978-93-86352-69-9.
- JV Chelliah (1946). Pattupattu - Ten Tamil Idylls (Tamil Verses with Englilsh Translation). Tamil University (1985 print).
- Daniélou, Alain (11 February 2003). A Brief History of India. Simon and Schuster. ISBN 9781594777943.
- Thomas Lehmann; Thomas Malten (1992). A Word Index of Old Tamil Caṅkam Literature. F. Steiner. ISBN 978-3-515-05814-8.
- Manguin, Pierre-Yves; Mani, A.; Wade, Geoff (2011). Early Interactions Between South and Southeast Asia: Reflections on Cross Cultural exchange. Institute of Southeast Asian Studies. ISBN 9789814345101.
- P. Meenakshi Sundaram (1965). History of Tamil Literature. Annamalai University.
- V. S. Rajam (1992). A Reference Grammar of Classical Tamil Poetry. American Philosophical Society. ISBN 978-0-87169-199-6.
- Ray, Himanshu Prabha (2003). The archaeology of seafaring in ancient South Asia. Cambridge: Cambridge University Press. ISBN 9780521011099.
- Rosen, Elizabeth S. (1975). "Prince ILango Adigal, Shilappadikaram (The anklet Bracelet), translated by Alain Damelou. Review". Artibus Asiae. 37 (1/2): 148–150. doi:10.2307/3250226. JSTOR 3250226.
- Nath sen, Sailendra (1999). Ancient Indian History and Civilization (Second ed.). Routledge. p. 205. ISBN 9788122411980.
- Selby, Martha Ann (2011) Tamil Love Poetry: The Five Hundred Short Poems of the Aiṅkuṟunūṟu, an Early Third-Century Anthology. Columbia University Press, ISBN 9780231150651
- Shinu, Abraham (2003). "Chera, Chola, Pandya: using archaeological evidence to identify the Tamil kingdoms of early historic South India". Asian Perspectives. 42 (2): 207–223. doi:10.1353/asi.2003.0031. hdl:10125/17189. S2CID 153420843. Archived from the original on 15 February 2009 – via Questia.
- Shulman, David (2016). Tamil. Harvard University Press. ISBN 978-0-674-97465-4.
- Takanobu Takahashi (1995). Tamil Love Poetry and Poetics. BRILL Academic. ISBN 90-04-10042-3.
- Herman Tieken (2001). Kāvya in South India: Old Tamil Caṅkam Poetry. BRILL. ISBN 978-90-6980-134-6.
- Wilden, Eva Maria (2014). Manuscript, Print and Memory: Relics of the Cankam in Tamilnadu. Walter de Gruyter. ISBN 978-3-11-035276-4.
- Wilson, A.Jeyaratnam (2000). Sri Lankan Tamil Nationalism: Its Origins and Development in 19th and 20th Centuries. UBC Press. ISBN 9780774807593.
- Kamil Zvelebil (1973). The Smile of Murugan: On Tamil Literature of South India. BRILL. ISBN 90-04-03591-5.
- Kamil Zvelebil (1974). Tamil Literature. Otto Harrassowitz Verlag. ISBN 978-3-447-01582-0.
- Kamil Zvelebil (1975). Tamil Literature. Handbook of Oriental Studies. BRILL. ISBN 90-04-04190-7.

Web-sources
