= Kār Nāṟpatu =

Tamil poetic work

Kaar Narpathu (Tamil: கார் நாற்பது) is a Tamil poetic work belonging to the Eighteen Lesser Texts (Pathinenkilkanakku) anthology of Tamil literature. This belongs to the 'post Sangam period' corresponding to 100–500 CE. Kar Narpathu contains forty poems written by the poet Kannankoothanaar, who lived in Madurai.

The poems of Kaar Narpathu deal with the agam (internal) subjects. In the Sangam literature, agam refers to subjects that explore the intangible aspects of life, such as human emotions, love, separation, and lovers' quarrels. Many of the poems in Kaar Narpathu depict the heroine being comforted by a friend who describes the beauty of the rainy season (the Tamil word "Kaar" means "rain").
