= Iṉṉā Nāṟpatu =

Tamil poetic work

Inna Narpathu (Tamil: இன்னா நாற்பது, romanized: Iṉṉā Nāṟpatu, lit. 'The Forty Undesirable Things') is a Tamil poetic work of didactic nature belonging to the Eighteen Lesser Texts (Pathinenkilkanakku) anthology of Tamil literature.

== History ==
The poems of Inna Narpathu are written in the Venpa meter. It was authored by Kapilar (c. 50–125 CE). Inna Narpathu is a collection of 40 poems describing the most undesirable things one should avoid. One of the meanings of the Tamil word Inna is one that brings unhappiness. Inna Narpathu includes four categories of harmful things one should avoid: a beautiful but disloyal wife, the wealth of a miser, a life under a tyrant, beauty of a flower without fragrance.

Inna Narpathu, together with Iniyavai Narpathu spells out in simple and succinct terms moral codes essential for daily life of the individual and for the society. They both emphasise the importance of education and individual responsibility in society.
