= Ācārakkōvai =

Tamil poetic work

Acharakkovai (Tamil: ஆசாரக்கோவை) is a poetic work of didactic nature belonging to the Eighteen Lesser Texts (Pathinenkilkanakku) anthology of Tamil literature. This belongs to the 'post Sangam period' corresponding to between 600 and 900 CE. Acharakkovai contains 100 poems written by the poet Peruvaayin Mulliyaar. The poems of Acharakkovai are written in the Venpa meter.

== Literature ==
Acharakkovai literally translates to "the garland of right conduct" of a Saiva author, Kayatturp Peruvayil Mulliyar. Acharakkovai shows influences of Sanskrit literature and hence believed to be of a later period than the other poems in the Pathinenkilkanakku anthology. The instructions in Acharakkovai are concerned with personal ritual and the correct method to follow. The work has 100 stanzas in venpa meter and is a collection of moral exhortations, ritual observances and customs that are considered proper and correct. 8 poems (1, 10, 27, 36, 46, 55, 56, 100) follow patrodai venpa (venpa having lines of five), 52 poems (3, 5, 6, 7, 8, 9, 12, 15, 19, 21, 22, 23, 24, 25, 28, 29, 30, 31, 39, 40, 41, 42, 45, 48, 49, 51, 52, 54, 59, 60, 61, 62, 63, 65, 70, 71, 72, 73, 75, 77, 78, 81, 86, 87, 88, 89, 90, 91, 93, 97, 98, 99) follow innisai chithial venpa (venpa with 3 lines), 33 poems (2, 4, 11, 13, 14, 17, 18, 20, 26, 32, 34, 35, 38, 43, 44, 47, 50, 53, 57, 58, 64, 66, 67, 68, 69, 74, 76, 82, 83, 84, 94, 95, 96) follow innisai venpa (venpa with 4 lines), 1 poem (33) follows kural venpa (venpa with lines of 2), 1 poem (16) follows cavalai venpa (venpa with lines of four) and remaining 5 poems (37, 79, 80, 85, 92) follow nerisai venpa (venpa with lines of four).

== Morals ==
The book is rich in etiquette and taboos, which are classificatory of any literature teaching morals.

=== Etiquette ===
The general importance of character elements of an individual namely blessings of parents (4), respect of five elements namely brahmins, cows, the Sun, the moon, the king and teachers (15,16, 74) and importance of speech (1) is stressed. Eating rules of eating like eating after feeding elderly, cows, birds and children (21, 26, 86) and direction of eating (24). Invite and prostrate before elders (62, 72, 40), carry umbrella for elders (60), not calling elders by name (80), not treating them arrogantly by words or body language (91), speaking by covering mouth (97), be attentive (94, 41), using the same nice tone with elders and inferiors (80), never despise food offered and self-boast about rituals performed(88) and not use prolonged abuse of wife (80). One should feed everyone during marriages, festivals and parental rituals (48); greet everyone heartily (31), never walk between Brahmins or deities, or between lamps and persons (31, 36). The way of dressing, speaking and reprimanding reveals the nature of a person (49) and the necessity of being modest is highlighted in 71.

=== Taboos ===
Twenty nine stanzas detail various taboos that throw superstition of the time. Verses 5-8 deal with eccil (pollution) that arises from urination, excretion, sexual contact, saliva, looking at an untouchable, but broadly misses the birth and death time pollutions. While bathing one must now swim, spit into water (14, 35, 36) and one should not see his reflection in water, scratch ground (13), not wear others' soiled slippers or clothes (12, 36), wear two garments while coming out of bath with one garment (11), not sleep opposite to door step (22, 45), nor facing north or midway point (30), use of both hands while providing drinks to elders (28), extinguish fire with water during the day (33), bow towards one sneezes (31), spitting or passing motion in various places (32), not to excrete facing south during the day or north during night (33), not pass motions imagining one is facing all ten directions (34).

== Caste Treatise ==
The notion of untouchability seems to have emerged in the Sangam period itself with references from the work indicating water touched by pulaiyar being considered unfit for consumption of higher caste. Pulaiyars are referred as meat eaters (since "pulai" means "meat").

== Criticism ==
The presence of this work in the Sangam literature is debated as the period of compilation is found to be in the late 8th century. There is heavy dosage of Brahminical influence in verses 2, 5, 15, 31, 34, 41, 47, 48, 61, 64 and 92. There is heavy influence of Sanskrit literature in the style of the work.
