= Alexandrian laurel =

List of plants with the same or similar names

Alexandrian laurel is a common name for several plants and may refer to:

- Calophyllum inophyllum, native to tropical Asia
- Danae racemosa, native to west Asia
