= Sangam landscape =

Geographical classification in Tamil literature

Thinais

The Sangam landscape (Tamil: அகத்திணை "inner classification") is the name given to a poetic device that was characteristic of love poetry in classical Tamil Sangam literature. The core of the device was the categorisation of poems into different tiṇais or modes, depending on the nature, location, mood and type of relationship represented by the poem. Each tiṇai was closely associated with a particular landscape, and imagery associated with that landscape—its flowers, trees, wildlife, people, climate and geography—was woven into the poem in such a way as to convey a mood, associated with one aspect of a romantic relationship.

== Symbolism ==
Classical Tamil love poetry assigns the human experiences it describes, and in particular the subjective topics that those experiences relate to, to specific habitats. Every situation in the poems is described using themes in which the time, the place and the floral symbols of each episode are codified. These codifications are used as symbols to imply a socio-economic order, occupations and behaviour patterns, which, in turn, are symbolized, by specific flora and fauna. Details of secondary aspects are just as rigidly codified—the seasons, the hour a god, musical instruments and, above all, the sentimental connotations of each landscape: lovers' meetings, patient waiting, lovers' quarrels, separation, and the anxiously awaited return.

=== Geographical and non-geographical thinais ===
Under this codification, the inner universe associated with love is divided into seven modes, or thinai, five of which are geographical and associated with specific landscapes, and two of which are non-geographical and not associated with any specific landscape. Four of the geographical landscapes are described as being landscapes that occur naturally in the Tamil lands. These are: kuṟiñci (குறிஞ்சி)—mountainous regions, associated with union, mullai (முல்லை)—forests, associated with waiting, marutam (மருதம்)—cropland, associated with quarreling, and neital (நெய்தல்)—seashore, associated with pining. The fifth—pālai (பாலை), or desert, associated with separation—is described in the Tolkappiyam as not being a naturally existing landscape.

From these basic associations of landscape and subject, a wide range of specific themes suitable for each landscape were derived. Thus, for example, the commentary on the Iraiyanar Akapporul states that as a result of the association of the kuṟiñci landscape with union, it was also associated with the fear of separation, reassurance, the hero's or heroine's discussions with their friends, their being teased or taunted by their friends, their replies to their friends, the friends' role as intermediary, the meeting of the lovers, grief and doubt, and other similar themes. According to the Tamilneri vilakkam, a 9th-century text on poetry, the love themes described by the five thinais constitute "the Tamil way of life" or "the Tamil way of love" (tamiḻneṟi).

The two non-geographical modes—kaikkilai and peruntiṇai—were seen as dealing with emotions that were non-conforming, and therefore were not associated with any specific landscape. Kaikkilai, dealt with unreciprocated or one-sided love, while peruntiṇai, dealt with 'improper' love or love against the rules of custom.

=== Poetic attributes of the landscapes ===
The following table is adapted from table 7.3 in The Pearson Indian History Manual for the UPSC Civil Services Preliminary Examination (Singh, 2008).

	Kuṟinji	Mullai	Marudam	Neithal	Pālai
God	Seyon	Maayon	Indra/Vendan	Vayu/Kadalon	Kotravai
Theme in Poetry	Elopment	Patient waiting over separation	Lovers' quarrels, wife's irritability (husband accused of visiting a courtesan)	Longest separation	Dangerous journey by the hero
Flower	Kuṟinji	Mullai (Jasmine)	Marudam	Neiythal malar (Water lily)	Pālai
Landscape	Mountains	Forest, pasture	Agricultural areas, plain or valley	Seashore	Parched wasteland, Desert
Time	Midnight	Evening	Shortly before sunrise	Sunset	Noon
Season/Climate	Winter/Cool and moist	Late Summer/Rainy seasonCloudy	Late spring	Early summer	Summer
Animal	Monkey, elephant, horse, bull, Tiger	Deer, Tiger	Water Buffalo, freshwater fish	Crocodile, shark	Fatigued elephant, tiger, or wolf
Crop/Plant/Food	Jackfruit, bamboo, venkai	Konrai Milk Curd|| Mango || Punnai || Cactus			
Water	Waterfall	Rivers	Pond	Well, sea	dry wells, stagnant water
Soil	Red and black soils with stones and pebbles	Red soil	Alluvial	Sandy, saline soil	salt affected soil
Occupation	hunting, gathering honey	Ruler's/Empire's. animal husbandry, shifting cultivation	agriculture	fishing, coastal trade, salt manufacturing	traveling, fighting (warriorship)

== The geographical thinais ==
In Tamil, each of the five geographical thinais are named for a flower that is characteristic of that landscape. In English translation, however, it is customary to use the name of the landscape rather than that of the flower, largely because the flowers lack the cultural association with a specific language in English that they have in Tamil.

=== Kurinji—Mountainous Region ===
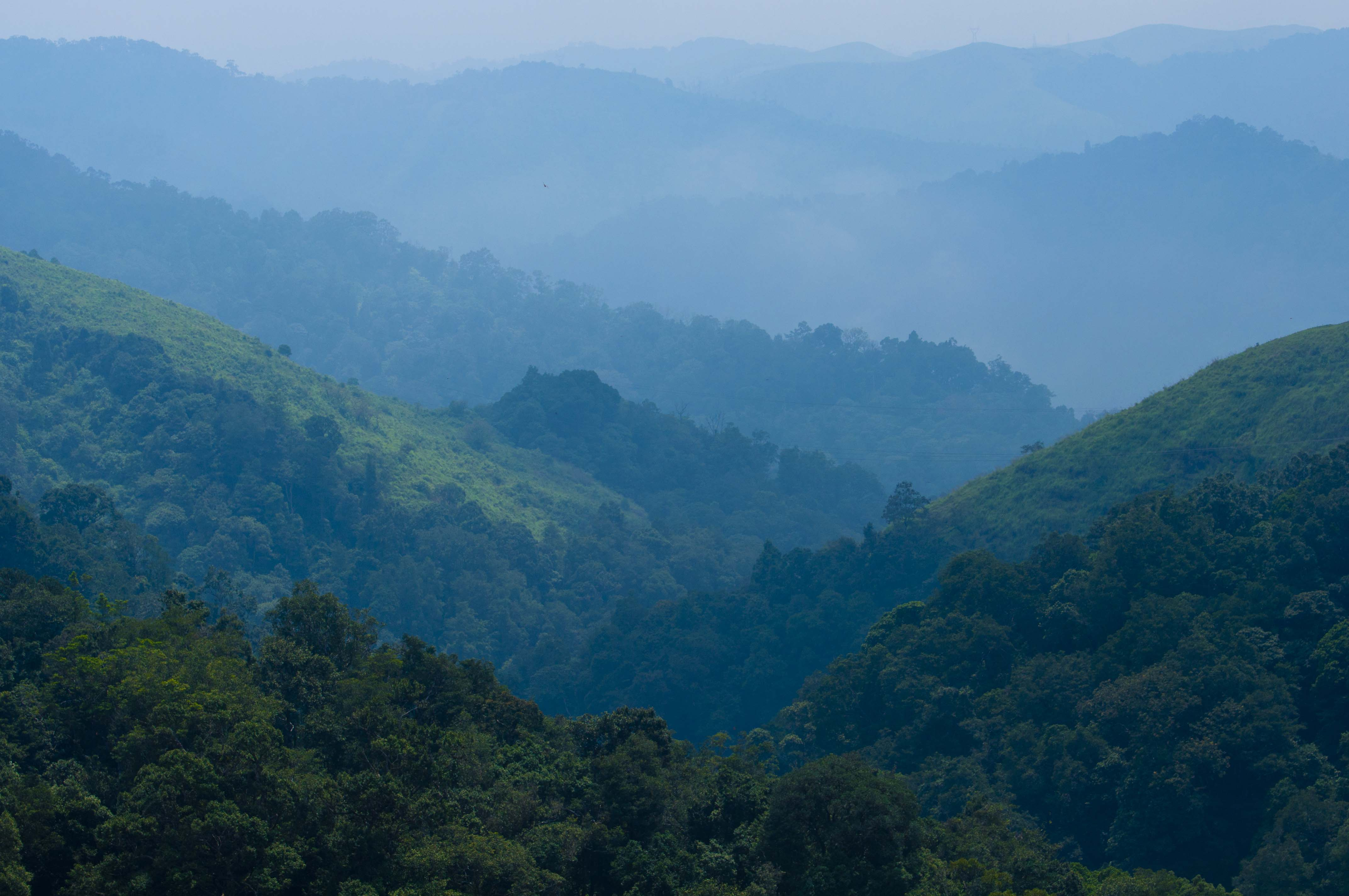
Western Ghats, Tamil Nadu

The mountain is the scene of the lovers' union at midnight. It is the cold, dewy season. The forest is rich with lakes, waterfalls, teak, bamboo and sandalwood. In this region millet grows and wild bees are a source of honey. Love in this setting is exemplified by Murugan, and one of his wives, Valli, the daughter of a mountain dweller. He wears the sparkling red kantal flower and rides a peacock, the bird of the mountains.

The region of Kurinchi is named after the kurinji flower (Strobilanthes kunthiana), a shrub native to the hills of Tamil Nadu that blooms for a few days once every ten to twelve years. In classical Tamil literature, this periodic flowering and the surrounding mountain environment which is characterized by waterfalls, wildlife, and peacocks, serve as traditional poetic motifs symbolizing sudden romantic union.

The people of this region were known by the names kanavar, vedar and kuravar whose prime occupation was hunting, honey harvesting and millet cultivation. The Vedars or Vettuvars (derived from vettai - hunting) were the main hunters, kanavars (derived from kanam - forest) hunted elephants and pigs, the kuravars or kunravar (derived from kunru - hill) were forest cultivators. Their headmen were known as Verpan, Poruppan and Silamban. Their totems included Murugan (god of war and hunting, under the name Seyyon), the Vel (spear of Murugan), the tiger and the tree Venkai. Their settlements were known as sirukuti and their place-names attached the suffixes kuricci (hilly village) and malai (hill).

'குறிஞ்சி—தலைவன் கூற்று'

கொங்குதேர் வாழ்க்கை அஞ்சிறைத் தும்பி
காமம் செப்பாது கண்டது மொழிமோ
பயிலியது கெழீஇய நட்பின் மயிலியல்
செறியெயிற் றரிவை கூந்தலின்
நறியவும் உளவோ நீயறியும் பூவே.

—இறையனார்.

Kuṟiñci (Kuṟuntokai-2)
Beautiful-winged bee
whose life is passed in search of honey
don't speak to me of desire
but tell me what you really saw:

Could even the flowers that you know
be as full of fragrance
as the hair of the woman
with the even set of teeth and the peacock nature,
to whom long affection binds me?

—Irayanār

=== Mullai—Forests ===
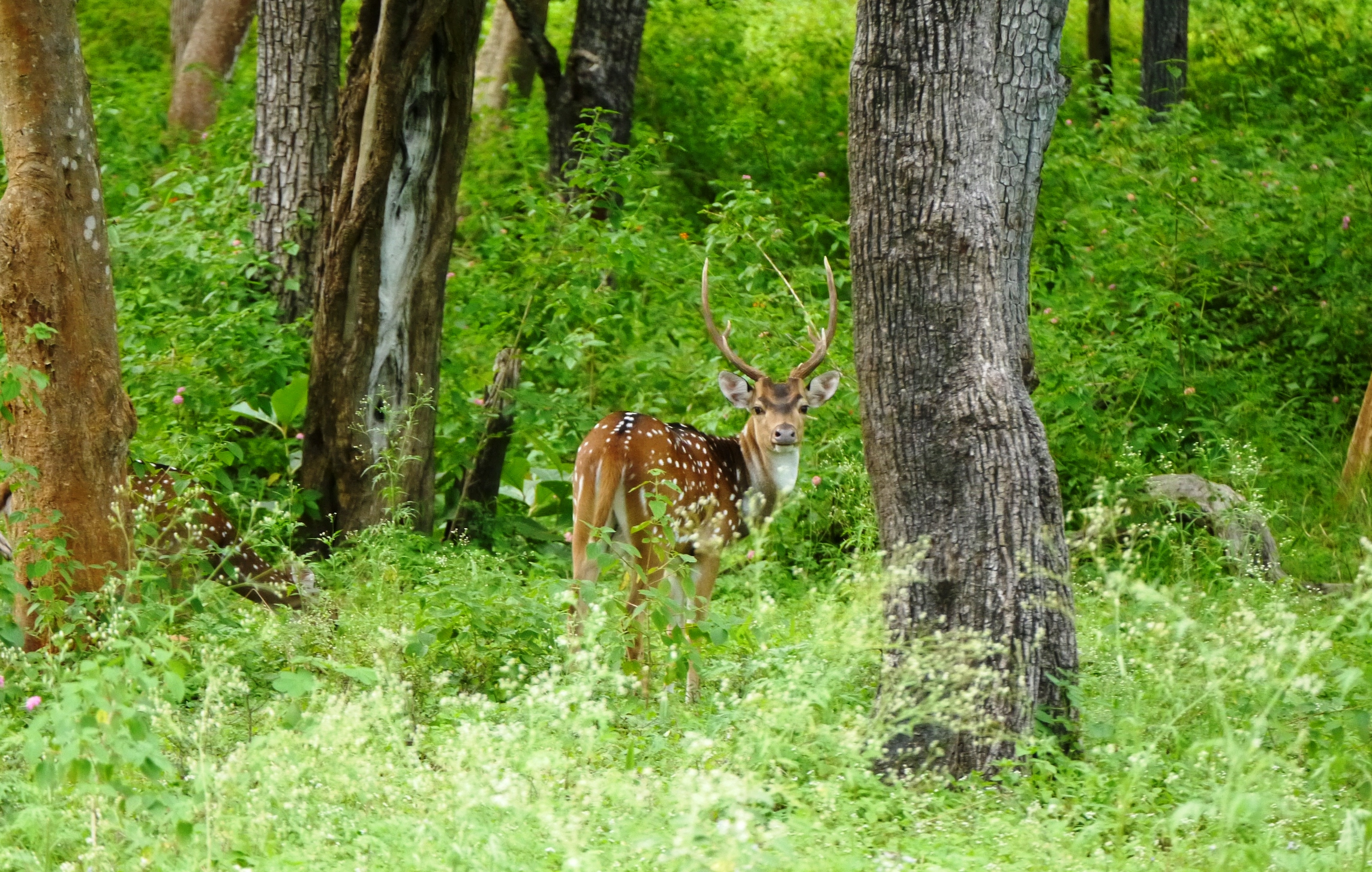
Forest habitat, Mudumalai National Park

Mullai is the land of the forest. The forest is rich with lakes, waterfalls, teak, bamboo and sandalwood. In this region millet grows and wild bees are a source of honey. Mullai or Jasmine (Jasminum auriculatum) is the flower of the forests. The inhabitants are descendants of God Krishna and were known as Ayar(Male) and Aatchiyar (female), *kōnar, kovalar, Vaduga iyer/Vaduga ayar, Ayar, Sambar idayar, Valathu Kai marappu idaiyar and idaiyar, whose occupation included Ruling land's, livestock, shifting cultivation, husbandry and dairy farming. The kovalars were cowherder and the ayar were pastoralists involved in cattle herding. Their settlements were known as pādi/cheri and seven nrega the suffixes patti, vati, katu and ental attached to their place-names. Their headmen bore the titles Ayar/kon, Annal, Tonral, Kuramporai, and headwomen as Aatchiyar and Manaivi.

The theme of the forest and of shepherds at play, the image of confident waiting for the loved one, produced an original offshoot; for this is the region of Maayon/kopalan, (Ancient Tamil god), and the love theme it represents symbolizes the devotee waiting in the hope that Maayon will eventually come and fill his soul, thus experiencing the joys of expectation.

முல்லை—தலைவி கூற்று

சுடர்செல் வானஞ் சேப்பப் படர்கூர்ந்
தெல்லறு பொழுதின் முல்லை மலரும்
மாலை என்மனார் மயங்கி யோரே
குடுமிக் கோழி நெடுநக ரியம்பும்
பெரும்புலர் விடியலு மாலை
பகலும் மாலை துணையி லோர்க்கே.

—மிளைப்பெருங் கந்தனார்.

The sun goes down and the sky reddens, pain grows sharp,
light dwindles. Then is evening
when jasmine flowers open, the deluded say.
But evening is the great brightening dawn
when crested cocks crow all through the tall city
and evening is the whole day
for those without their lovers.

—(Kuruntokai-234) tr. George L. Hart

=== Marutham—Cropland ===
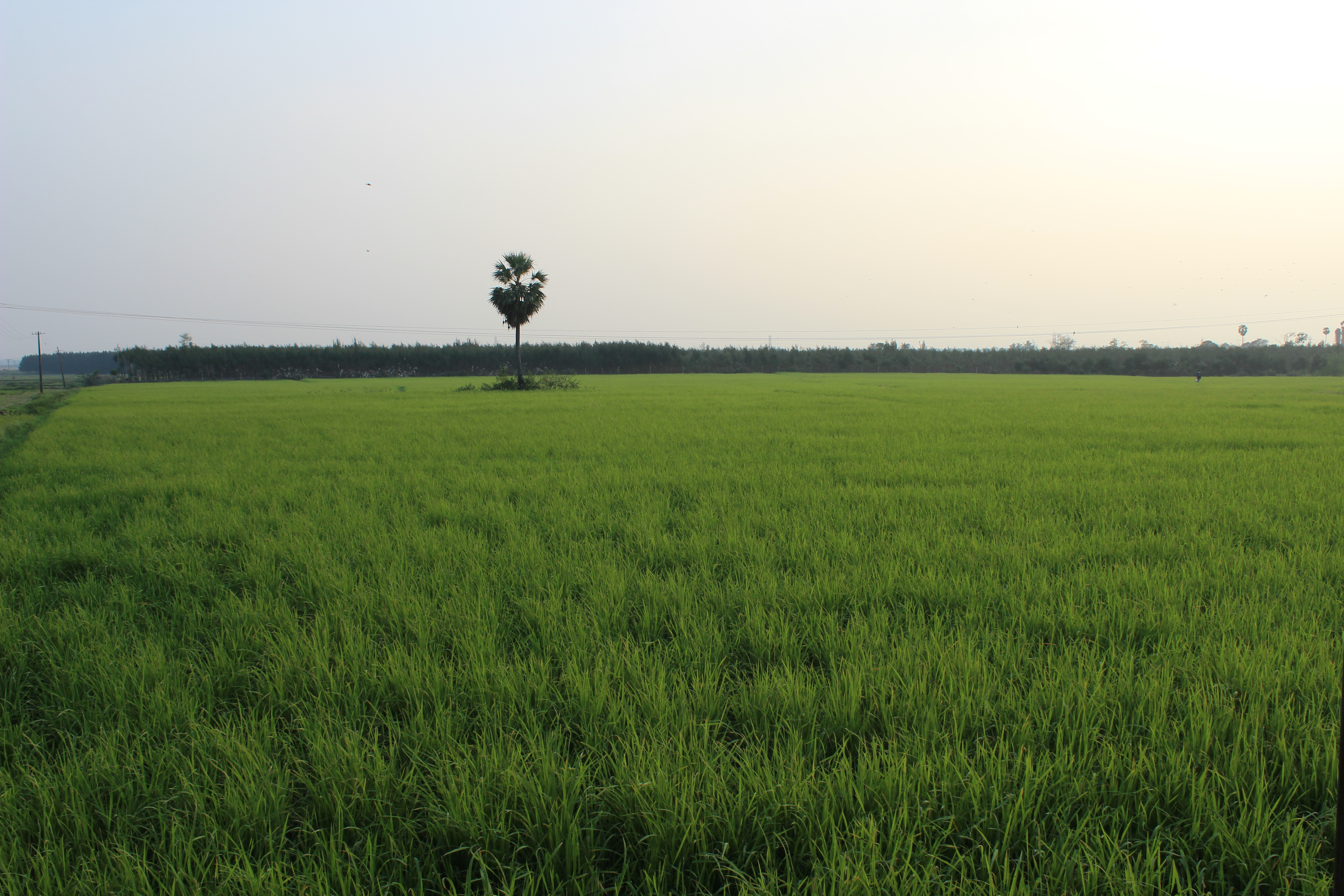
Paddy fields, Tamil Nadu

The plains were the scene of triangular love plots in which the hero's visits to the courtesan oblige the heroine to counter with a mixed show of coquetry and moodiness, tactics whose limits are described in the Thirukkural ("Sulking is like flavouring with salt; a little suffices, but it is easy to go too far."). Senon, the god of thunderstorm, is the god of Marutham land. The inhabitants were known as ulavar, velanmadar, toluvar and kadaiyar or kadasiyan whose occupations were involved in agriculture. The ulavar were the ploughers, the velanmadar and toluvar the tillers and the kadaiyars were the farmworkers. Their headmen were known as Mahinan, Uran and Manaiyol. Their settlements were known as perur and their place-names often had the suffixes eri, kulam, mankalam and kudi.

The Marutam (Lagerstroemia speciosa) tree was the characteristic tree of this region.

மருதம்—தலைவி கூற்று

மள்ளர் குழீஇய விழவி னானும்
மகளிர் தழீஇய துணங்கை யானும்
யாண்டுங் காணேன் மாண்தக் கோனை
யானுமோர் ஆடுகள மகளே என்கைக்
கோடீ ரிலங்குவளை நெகிழ்த்த
பீடுகெழு குரிசிலுமோர் ஆடுகள மகனே

—ஆதிமந்தியார்.

Nowhere, not among the warriors at their festival,
nor with the girls dancing close in pairs,
nowhere did I see him.

I am a dancer;

—for love of him
these conch-shell bangles slip
from my wasting hands—

he's a dancer too.

—Marutham (Kuruntokai-31)

=== Neithal—Seashore ===
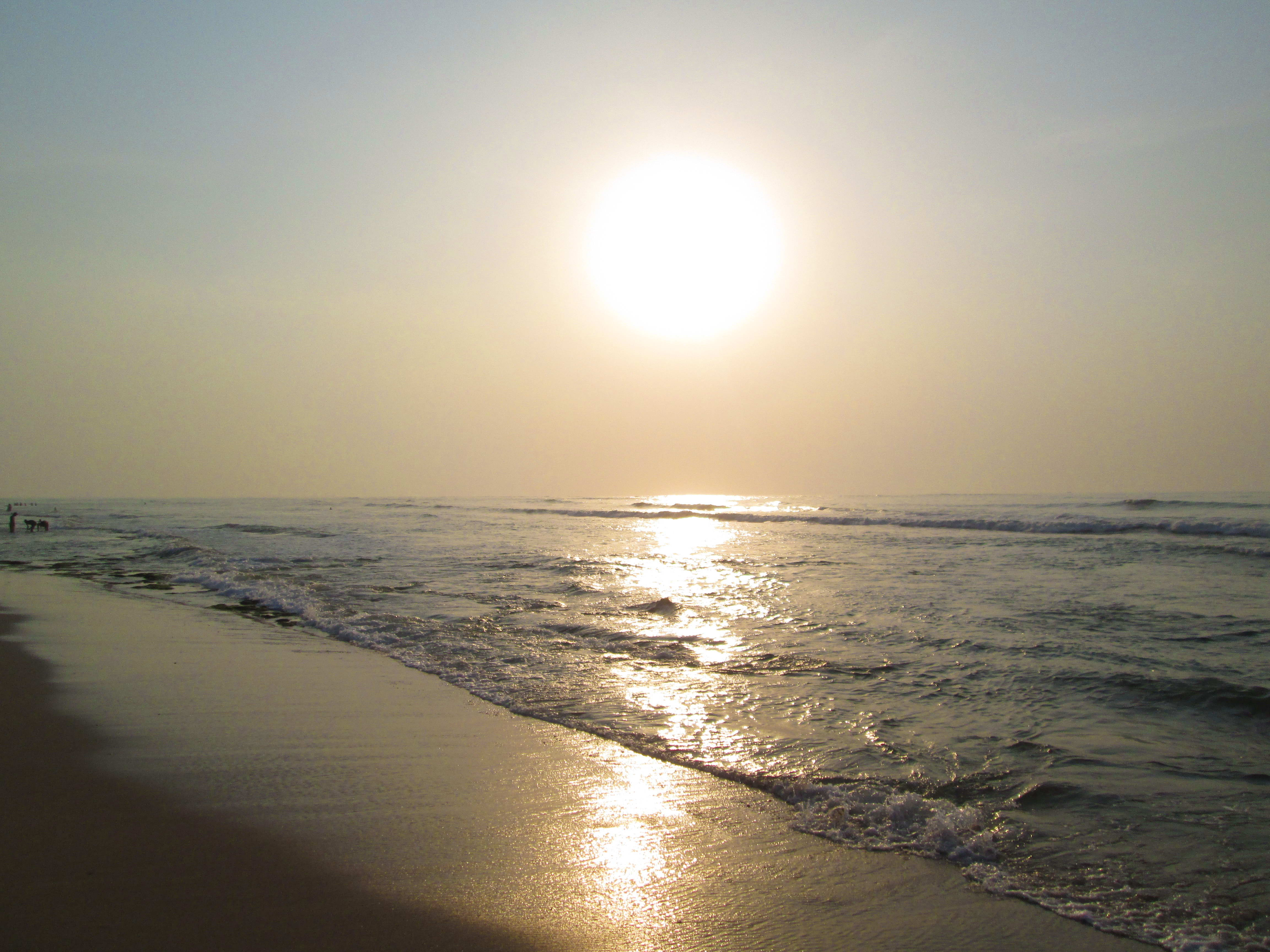
Dawn at the seashore of Tiruchendur

The seashore affords many examples of the compelling charm of Sangam poetry and the extraordinary freshness of its realism. From behind the conventional symbolization of waiting there emerges a picture of the life of the fisherfolk; the nets and boats drawn up on the beach, scuttling crabs and cart wheels bogged down in the sand, the odour of drying fish, cut into thick slices, which attracts the birds, beautiful village girls peering through the Pandanus hedges, and the wind blowing through the cracks in the roughly constructed straw huts at night. Kadalon, the water god, is worshiped in Neithal. The inhabitants were known as parathavar, nulaiyar and umanar whose occupations included fishing, coastal trade, pearl diving and salt manufacturing. The parathavars were sailors and fishermen, the nulaiyar were the divers and umanars the salt manufacturers and merchants. Their settlements were known as pakkam or pattinam, which were maritime trading ports. The headmen were known as Thuraivan, Pulampan and Serppan.

The neithal, or water lily is the characteristic flower of the region.

நெய்தல் இருங்கழி நெய்தல் நீக்கி
மீனுநுண் குருகுஇளங் கானல் அல்கும்
கடல்அணிந் தன்றுஅவர் ஊரே
கடலினும் பெரிது எமக்கு அவருடை நட்பே.

Water lilies bloom
in the lagoons
where cranes part the water lilies
looking for fish
then fly away to stay
in fragrant seaside groves,
near my lover's village washed by the sea.

His love for me
is greater than the sea.

—Neithal (Ainkurunuru-184)

=== Pālai—Dry Lands ===
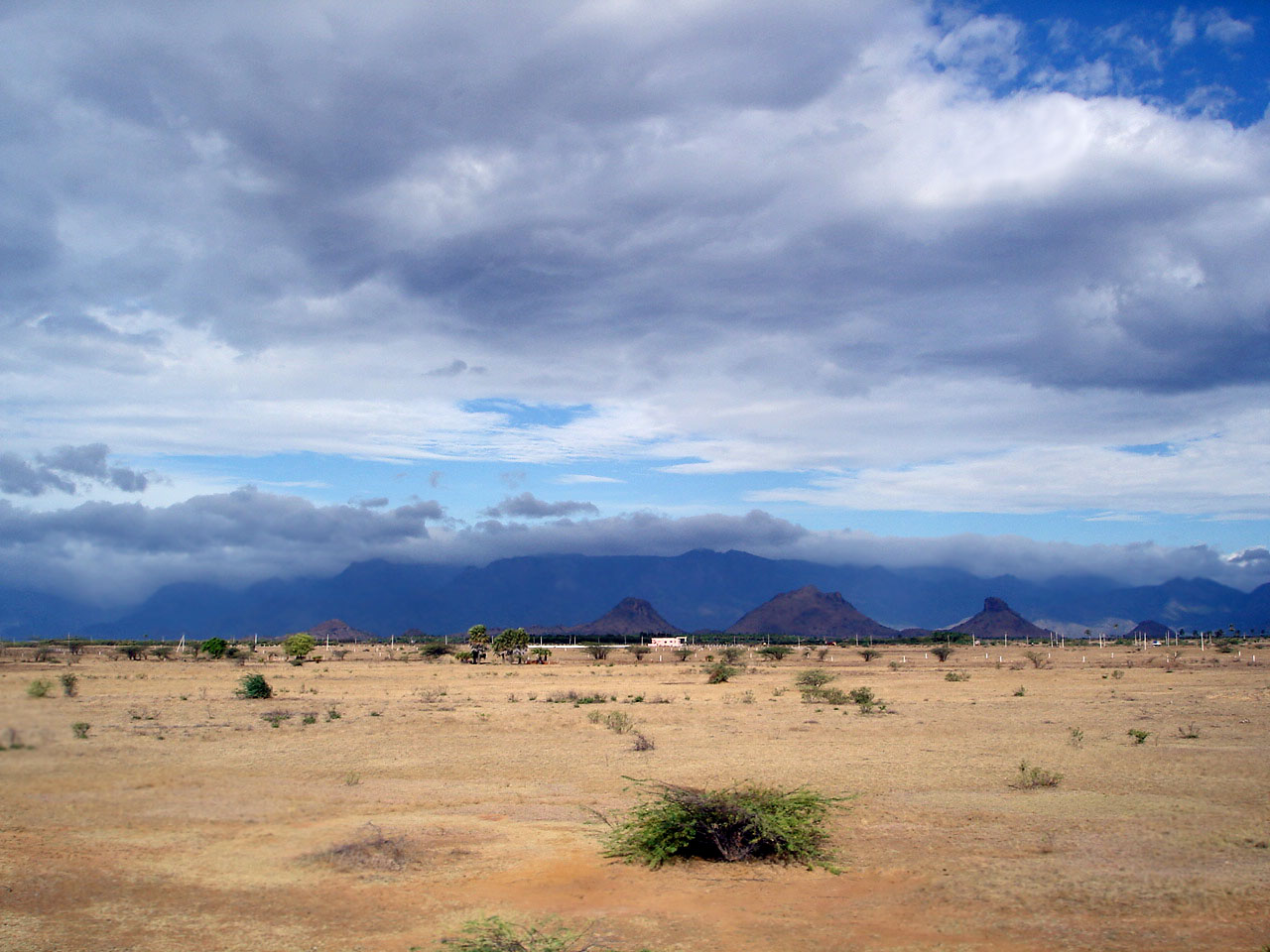
Dry land in Tirunelveli district

In classical Tamil prosody, the pālai or wasteland is not seen as being a naturally occurring ecology. Ilampuranar, in his commentary on the Tolkappiyam, explains that instead, the landscape of the wasteland with which the paalai is associated emerges when other landscapes whither under the heat of the burning sun. The palai flower is identified as Wrightia (Wrightia tinctoria). The people inhabiting this region are known as eyiner, maravar and kalvar who were involved in waylaying, highway robbery and soldiering. The Eyiner (from ey – bow) were hunters who hunted with bow, the maravar (from maram – valour) were soldiers and the kalvar (from kal – robbery) were robbers. Their chiefs were known as mili, vitalai and kalai. Their settlements were known as kurumpu. Kotravai, the Mother goddess and goddess of war, is worshipped here.

The theme of wasteland and separation occupies half of one of the most famous anthologies, the theme of the mountain being only secondary.

பாலை—கூற்று தோழி நிலந்தொட்டுப் புகாஅர் வானம் ஏறார்
விலங்கிரு முந்நீர் காலிற் செல்லார்
நாட்டின் நாட்டின் ஊரின் ஊரின்
குடிமுறை குடிமுறை தேரிற்
கெடுநரும் உளரோநம் காதலோரே.
—வெள்ளி வீதியார்.

They will not dig up the earth and enter it,
They will not climb into the sky,
They will not walk across the dark sea.
If we search every country,
every city,
every village,
can our respective lovers escape us?

—Pālai (Kuṟuntokai-130)
