= Venpa =

Meter and form of classical Tamil poetry

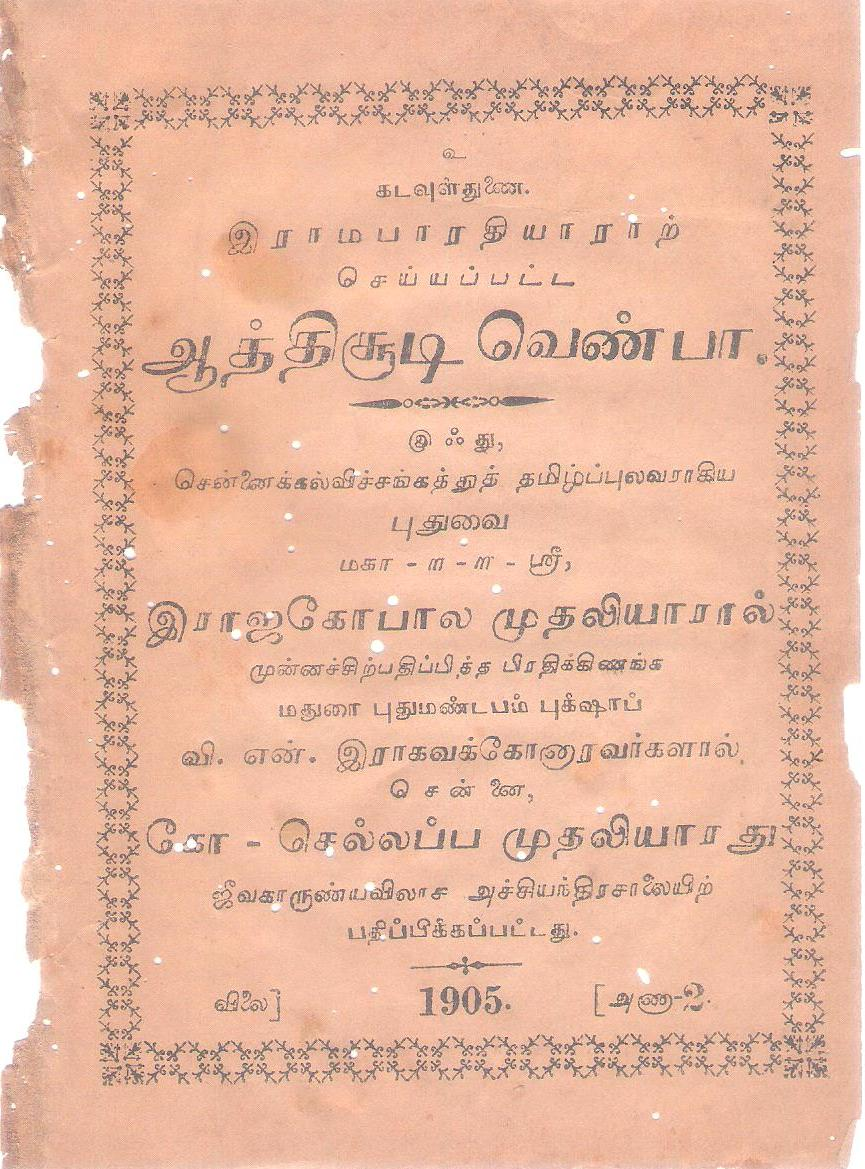
Venba in Aathichoodi

Venpa or Venba (வெண்பா in Tamil) is a form of classical Tamil poetry. Classical Tamil poetry has been classified based upon the rules of metric prosody. Such rules form a context-free grammar. Every venba consists of between two and twelve lines. The venpa meter is used in songs of the types neṭu veṇ pāṭṭu ('long song in venpa meter'), kuṟu veṇ pāṭṭu 'short song in venpa meter', kaikkiḷai "one-sided love," and paripāṭṭu 'song that is quite accommodative' and in satirical compositions (aṅkatac ceyyuḷ).

== Popular books written in venba style ==
1. All 1330 couplets from the Thirukkural, composed by Thiruvalluvar, are examples of venba. Tirukkural comes under a sub-category of venba called Kural venba, wherein each kural or couplet has only two lines.
2. Nala venba^{1} is another classical work written in venba style.
3. Niti venba^{2} is another venba style book that preaches values.
4. Acharakkovai^{3} is another venba style book that preaches values

== Basic elements of meter in classical Tamil poetry ==
•Vowels and consonant-vowel compounds(such as ka, kā, ki, kī) in Tamil alphabet have been classified into ones with short sounds (kuril) and the ones with longer sounds (nedil).

• Asai(Acai): Vowels and such vowel-consonant compound/s optionally followed by a consonant is known as asai(lit. move). The Tamil word asai roughly corresponds to syllable/a group of syllables. Asai is of two types - Nēr(lit. linear/straightforward) asai and Nirai(lit.waves) asai.

•Sīr or cīr: Sīr is the metrical foot in Tamil poetry.

•Thalai(lit. binding): The juxtaposition of metrical foot patterns.

Note that the official terms for the different "asai"s are self-descriptive. For example, the word "ner" is itself classified as ner asai. And the word "nirai" is a nirai asai.

== Grammar for meter in Venba ==
A set of well defined metric rules define the grammar for venba. Such rules have been proved to form a context-free grammar.

One set of rules constrains the duration of sound for each word or cīr, while another set of rules defines the rules for the possible sounds at the beginning of a word that follows a given sound at the end of the preceding word. Any venbā should conform to both these sets of rules.

Following is the set of production rules corresponding to the first set of rules.

 <VENBAA> → <ADI>{1-11} <EETRADI>
 <ADI> → <CHEER> <CHEER> <CHEER> <CHEER>
 <EETRADI> → <CHEER> <CHEER> <EETRU CHEER>
 <CHEER> → <EERASAI> | <MOOVASAI>
 <EETRU CHEER> → <NAAL> | <MALAR> | <KAASU> | <PIRAPPU>
 <EERASAI> → <THEMAA> | <PULIMAA> | <KARUVILAM> | <KOOVILAM>
 <MOOVASAI> → <THEMAANGAAI> | <PULIMAANGAAI> | <KOOVILANGAAI> | <KARUVILANGAAI>
 <THEMAA> → <NER> <NER>
 <PULIMAA> → <NIRAI> <NER>
 <KARUVILAM> → <NIRAI> <NIRAI>
 <KOOVILAM> → <NER> <NIRAI>
 <THEMAANGAAI> → <THEMAA> <NER>
 <PULIMAANGAAI> → <PULIMAA> <NER>
 <KARUVILANGAAI> → <KARUVILAM> <NER>
 <KOOVILANGAAI> → <KOOVILAM> <NER>
 <NAAL> → <NER>
 <MALAR> → <NIRAI>
 <KAASU> → <NER> <NER>
 <PIRAPPU> → <NIRAI> <NER>
 <NER> → <KURIL> | <NEDIL> | <NER> <OTRU>
 <NIRAI> → <KURIL> <KURIL> | <KURIL> <NEDIL> | <NIRAI> <OTRU>
 <KURIL> → {VOWELS OR COMPOUNDS WITH A SHORT SOUND}
 <NEDIL> → {VOWELS OR COMPOUNDS WITH A LONG SOUND}
 <OTRU> → {CONSONANTS, WHICH HAVE AN EXTREMELY SHORT SOUND}

 1. {1-11} is not a standard BNF notation but a widely accepted EBNF notation indicating   
 repetition of number of times specified in the range.
 2. The grammar has some redundant productions that have been retained so as to preserve 
 the semantics as described originally in Tamil grammar.

Following is the set of production rules corresponding to the second set of rules.

 <VENBAA>   → <X> | <Y>
 <X>	 → <THEMAA> <Y>
 <X>	 → <KOOVILAM> <X>
 <Y>	 → <PULIMAA> <Y>
 <Y>	 → <KARUVILAM> <X>
 <X>	 → <NAAL> | <KAASU>
 <Y>	 → <MALAR> | <PIRAPPU>
 
[If the above rules are conformed to, the ''thalai'' is said to be ''Iyarcheer vendalai'']
 
 <X>	 → <THEMAANGAAI> <X>
 <X>	 → <KOOVILAANGAAI> <X>
 <Y>	 → <PULIMAANGAAI> <X>
 <Y>	 → <KARUVILANGAAI> <X>
 
 [If the above rules are conformed to, the ''thalai'' is said to be ''Vencheer vendalai'']

== Example ==
Following is a couplet from Tirukkural:

உடுக்கை இழந்தவன் கைபோல ஆங்கே
இடுக்கண் களைவதாம் நட்பு.

— Kural 788
Translation:

As hand of him whose vesture slips away,
Friendship at once the coming grief will stay.

— Translated by G. U. Pope

Parse tree for the above Kural for the first set of grammar rules given in the grammar section - Note: 0 represents 'kuril', 1 represents 'nedil', and 2 represents 'otru'.

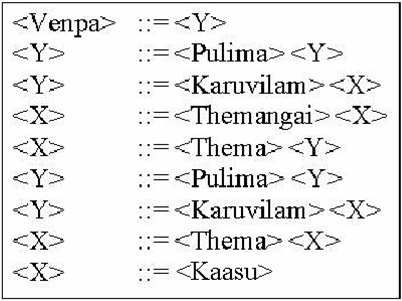
Set of productions for the same Kural for the second set of rules given in the grammar section
