= Perumal (deity) =

Hindu deity

- God of Vaikuntha
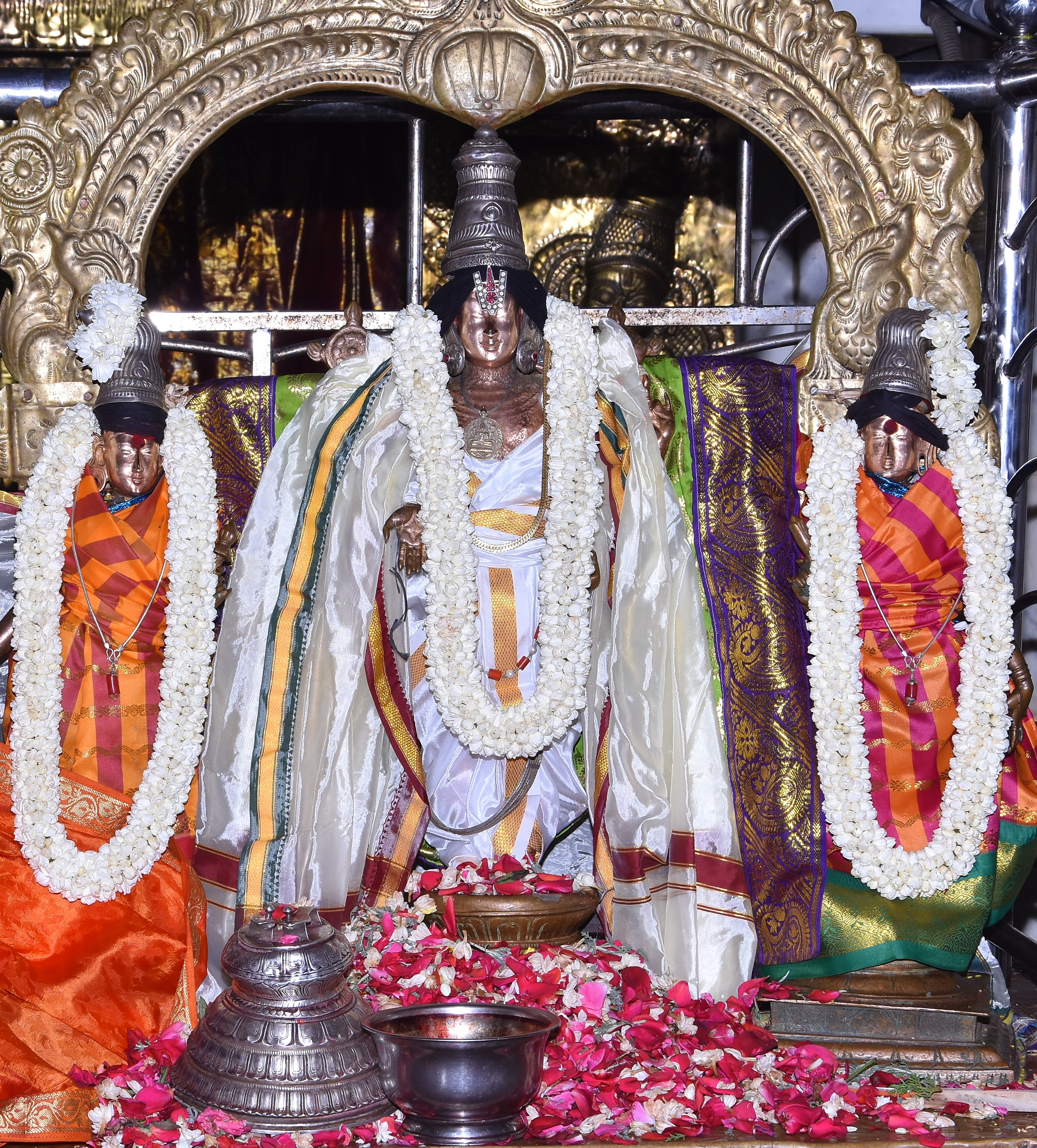
- Murti of Perumal (centre) with Sridevi (left) and Bhudevi (right), Tirunelveli
- Other names: Govinda, Srinivasa, Narayana, Gopala, Venkateshvara, Vishnu
- Venerated in: Vaishnavism (Sri Vaishnavism)
- Abode: 108 Divya Desams, 108 Abhimana Kshethrams and Purana Kshethram of Vishnu.
- Mantra: Om Namo Narayanaya
- Symbol: Shanku, Chakram
- Mount: Garuda and Shesha
- Texts: Naalayira Divya Prabandham
- Festivals: Vaikuntha Ekadashi
- Consorts: Sridevi, Bhudevi, and Niladevi (three aspects of Mahalakshmi)

Perumal (Tamil: பெருமாள், romanized: Perumāl) or Tirumal (Tamil: திருமால், romanized: Tirumāl) is a Hindu deity. Perumal is worshipped mainly among Tamil Hindus in South India and the Tamil diaspora, who consider Perumal to be another name for Vishnu.

Some of the earliest known mentions of Perumal, and the Tamil devotional poems ascribed to him, are found in Paripāṭal – the Sangam era poetic anthology. He is a popular Hindu deity particularly among Tamils in Tamil Nadu and the Tamil diaspora, and in Vaishnava temples. One of the richest and largest Hindu temples complexes dedicated to Perumal is the Venkateswara temple in Tirupati, Andhra Pradesh. Other significant institutions include Srirangam's Ranganathaswamy temple, Kanchipuram's Varadaraja Perumal temple, and Thiruvananthapurum's Padmanabhaswamy Perumal temple.

== Etymology ==
Scholars believe that both Perumal and Tirumal ultimately trace their origin to a tribal confederacy known as the Mallas in ancient India, whose name was Dravidian for "people of the mountains". Both of these terms were originally titles conferred by the Mallas upon their great chiefs and kings. This title was eventually employed as an epithet for the deity Vishnu, until its original meaning was widely forgotten over the course of time. However, in some regions of Kerala, Perumal continued to be employed as its original usage as an honorific for a ruler.

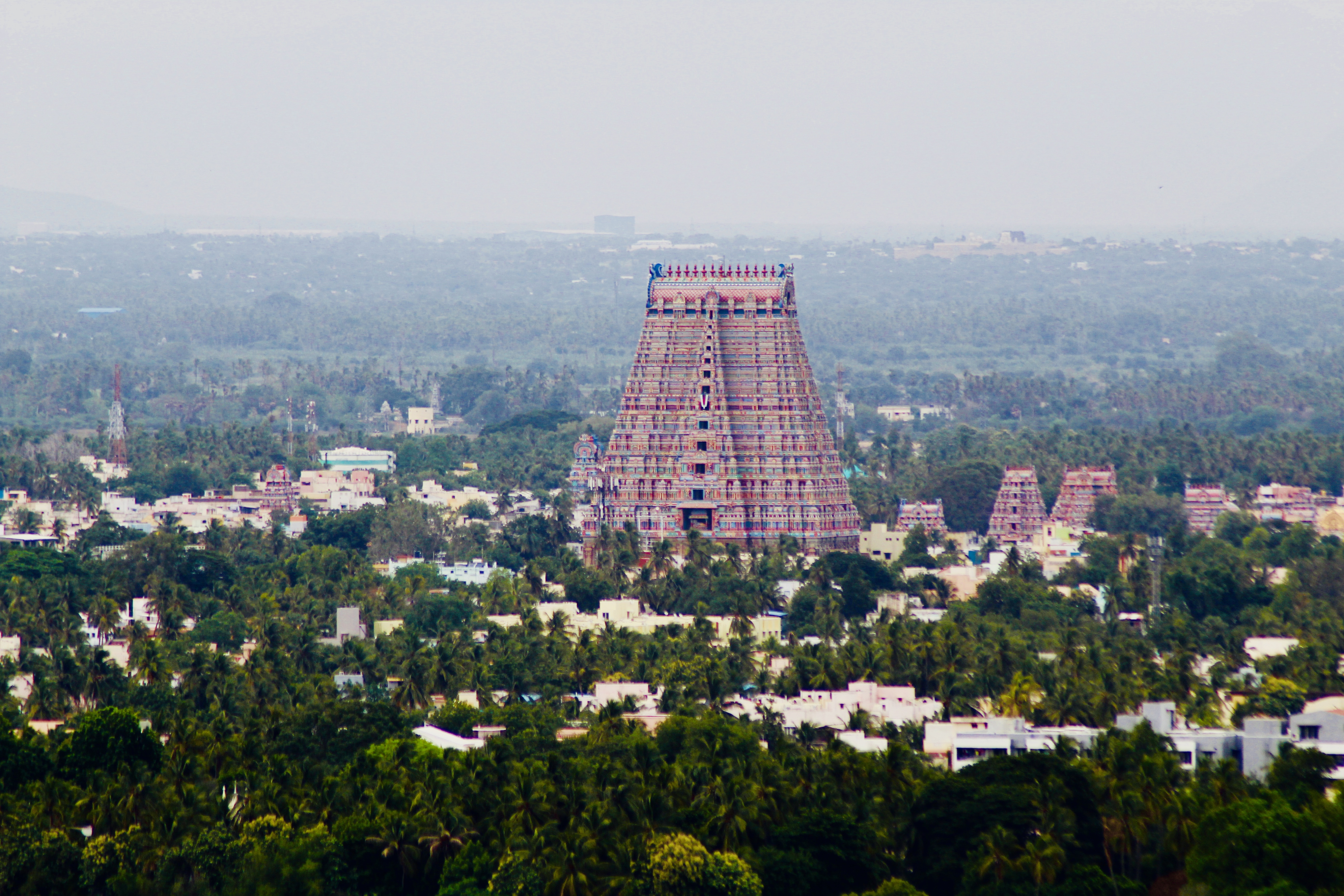
Srirangam temple complex across the river on left.

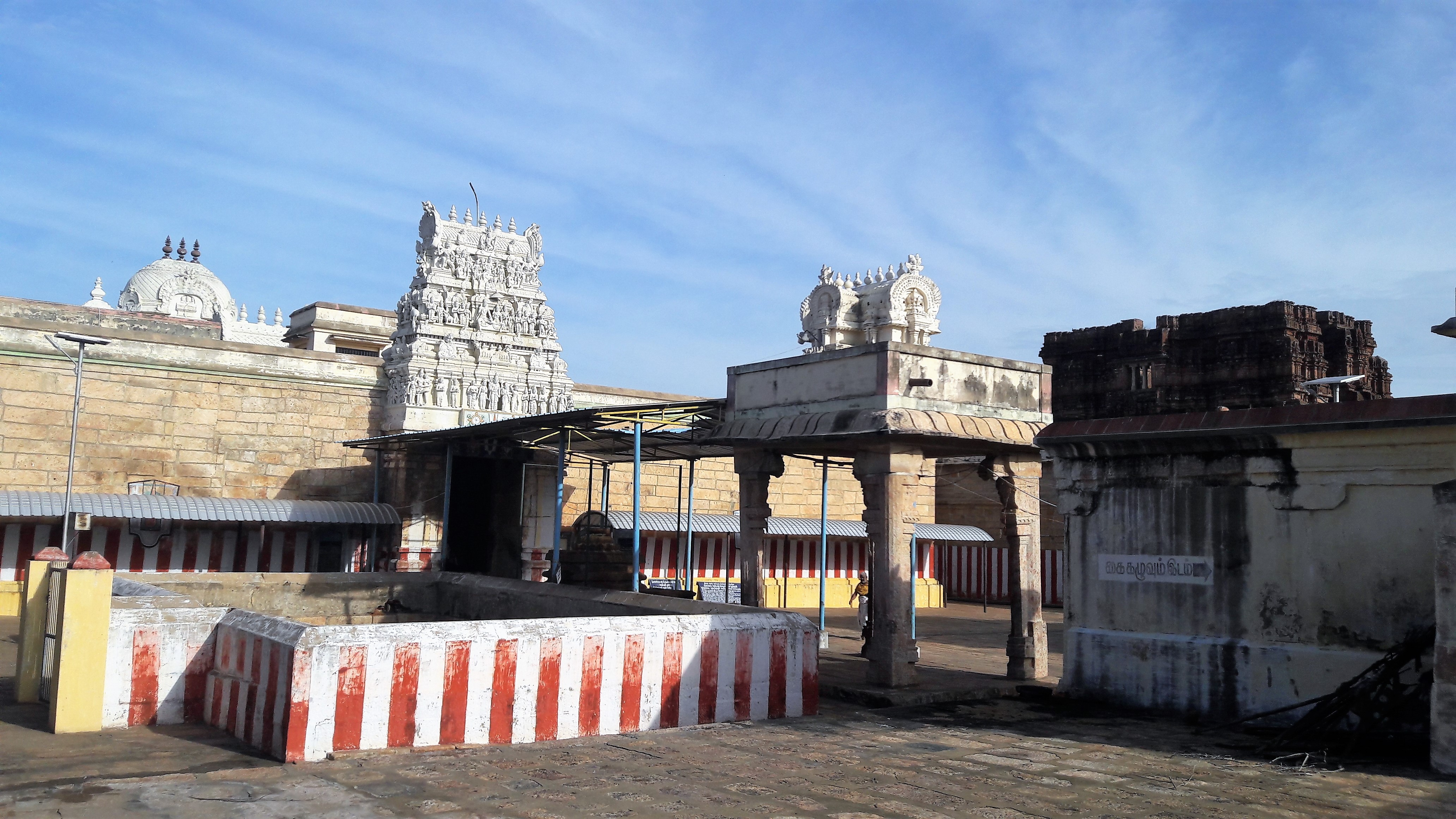
The temple tank in front of the main gateway

== Veneration ==
The deity Perumal is identified with Mayon, sometimes translated as "the dark-complexioned one", or more literally, "He whose power is Maya" (i.e. the Saguna Brahman) who is first referenced in the texts Purananuru and Pattupattu. Regarded to be the Tamil equivalent of Krishna, poetry from this period compares his dark skin to the ocean. Originally a folk deity, he was syncretised with Krishna and Vishnu, gaining popularity in the Sri Vaishnava tradition. His consort is Lakshmi, the goddess of fortune, beauty, and prosperity, appearing in even the earliest strata of Tamil poetry.

Mayon is indicated to be the deity associated with the mullai tiṇai (pastoral landscape) in the Tolkappiyam. He is regarded to be the only deity who enjoyed the status of Paramporul (achieving oneness with Paramatma) during the Sangam age. He is also known as Māyavan, Māmiyon, Netiyōn, and Māl in Sangam literature. A reference to "Mukkol Pakavars" in Sangam literature indicates that only Vaishnava saints were holding Tridanda and were prominent during the period. Tirumal was glorified as "the supreme deity", whose divine lotus feet could burn all evil and grant moksha. During the post-Sangam period, his worship was further glorified by the poet-saints called the Alvars.

=== Festivals ===
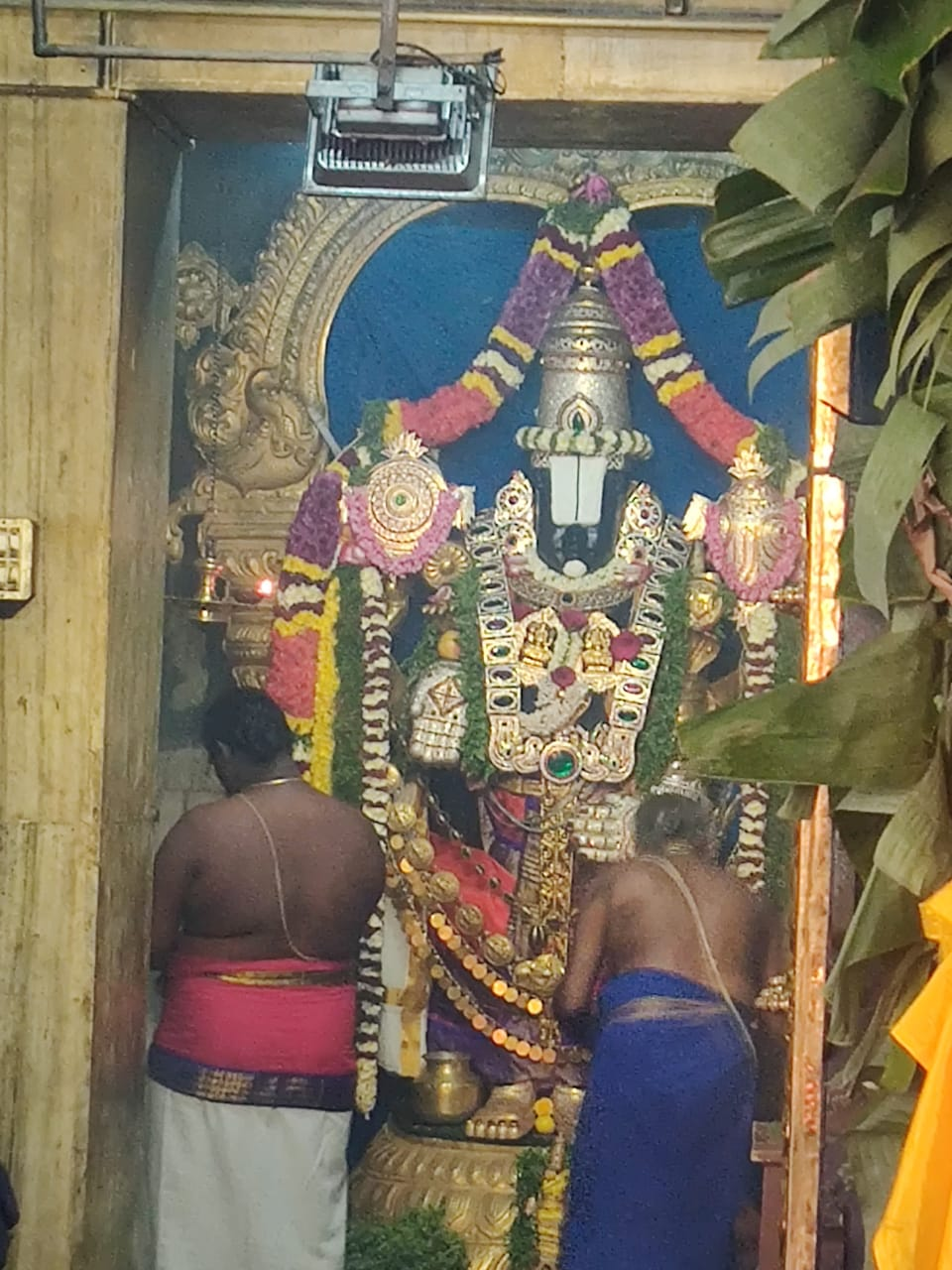
Moolavar of Vishnu-Perumal in Athur during Vaikuntha Ekadashi

In the contemporary period, a major feature of the temple festivals of Perumal is the temple car procession. During this generally multiple-day event, an image of the processional deity (utsavar) and his consorts are adorned with lavish jewellery and garments. The image is accompanied by royal paraphernalia, such as elaborate umbrellas (chatra) and fly-whisks (chamara) flanking the deity on either side. The images are carried to and fro from the temple on a chariot along the streets in great pomp, halting at places to receive the obeisance of devotees. Adherents bearing sacred banners march at the head of the procession, followed by drummers and trumpeters to announce the presence of the deity. The car (vahanam) is accompanied by Vaishnava temple priests, beating cymbals and singing the praises of the deity. The vehicle is often in the form of Garuda, Hanuman, lions, swans, and horses on varying days of the festival. At the tail of the procession is a group of singers, reciting verses from sacred texts such as the Vedas and the Nalayira Divya Prabandham.

== Hymns ==
Among the most renowned verses that hail Perumal is the Tirupallantu, composed by Periyalvar, one of the twelve Alvars of the Sri Vaishnava tradition:

Reverence, reverence be unto thee, O thou mighty One, who didst overcome the wrestlers, thou like to the sapphire in glory! Infinitely blest be the beauty of thy holy feet for many many years, for thousands of years, for crores of years, for ever!

All hail! Oh may no rift come 'twixt thy slaves and thee! All hail to Sri, who dwells, thy lustre, on thy right! All hail, the glorious discus in thy fair right hand! All hail to Panchajanyam sounding in the fight!

Legend of Narasimha according to Paripāṭal

O Lord with faultless red eyes! With
burning hatred in his heart and drying up the
sandal paste on his chest, Hiranyan the evil king
tortured his son Prahalathan for singing your
praises, inflicting on him great sorrow. The young
man was not disrespectful to his father who deserved
disrespect. You embraced Prahalathan’s fine chest
because of your love for him. You attacked and ruined
Hiranyan with great strength, leaping upon his
mountain-like chest as drums roared like thunder.
You tore him apart with your split claws and scattered
his flesh, along with broken pieces of pillar which you
split and came out, in your Narasimhan form.

Paripāṭal, poem 4, Verses 10–21

== Mention of Vishnu in Sangam literature ==
Vishnu or Perumal is considered the most mentioned god in the Sangam literature. Further examples can be seen as resources and references of the Sangam literature dedicated to Vishnu.

=== Tolkāppiyam ===
Perumal is considered to be another name of Vishnu, and was traditionally the deity associated with the forests. Mayon is indicated to be the deity associated with the mullai tiṇai (pastoral landscape) in the Tolkappiyam.

=== Paripāṭal ===
Tamil Sangam literature (200 BCE to 500 CE) mentions Mayon or the "dark one," as the supreme deity who creates, sustains, and destroys the universe and was worshipped in the mountains of Tamilakam. The verses of Paripadal describe the glory of Perumal in the most poetic of terms. Many Poems of the Paripadal consider Perumal as the Supreme god of Tamils.

தீயினுள் தெறல் நீ;
பூவினுள் நாற்றம் நீ;
கல்லினுள் மணியும் நீ;
சொல்லினுள் வாய்மை நீ;
அறத்தினுள் அன்பு நீ;
மறத்தினுள் மைந்து நீ;
வேதத்து மறை நீ;
பூதத்து முதலும் நீ;
வெஞ் சுடர் ஒளியும் நீ;
திங்களுள் அளியும் நீ;
அனைத்தும் நீ;
அனைத்தின் உட்பொருளும் நீ;

— Paripadal, iii: 63–68
Translation:

In fire, you are the heat;
in blossoms, the fragrance;
among the stones, you are the diamond;
in speech, truth;
among virtues, you are love;
in valour—strength;
in the Veda, you are the secret;
among elements, the primordial;
in the burning sun, the light;
in moonshine, its sweetness;
you are all,
and you are the substance and meaning of all.

— F Gros, K Zvelebil

=== Akanaṉūṟu ===
Number of poems echo the Hindu puranic legends about Parashurama, Rama, Krishna and others in the Akanaṉūṟu. According to Alf Hiltebeitel – an Indian Religions and Sanskrit Epics scholar, the Akanaṉūṟu has the earliest known mentions of some stories such as "Krishna stealing sarees of Gopis" which is found later in north Indian literature, making it probable that some of the ideas from Tamil Hindu scholars inspired the Sanskrit scholars in the north and the Bhagavata Purana, or vice versa. However the text Harivamsa which is complex, containing layers that go back to the 1st or 2nd centuries BCE, consists the parts of Krishna playing with Gopis and stealing sarees.

The Akanāṉūṟu has a reference to the Ramayana in poem 70. The poem places a triumphant Rama at Dhanushkodi, sitting under a Banyan tree, involved in some secret discussions, when the birds are chirping away. This seems to indicate that the story of the Ramayana was familiar in the Tamil lands before the Kamba Ramayanam of the 12th century.

=== Manimekalai ===
Vishnu is described to be a major deity in the epic Manimekalai, such as the Canto XIII:

Aputra then meets and accuses the Brahmins of twisting the meaning of the Veda verses taught by Brahma born from the navel of Maha Vishnu who holds a golden disc as his weapon. Aputra reminds the Brahmins that the greatest Vedic teachers such as Vasishtha and Agastya were born of low birth.

=== Cilappatikaram ===
ஆயிரம் விரித்தெழு தலையுடை அருந்திறற் பாயற் பள்ளிப் பலர்தொழு தேத்த விரிதிரைக் காவிரி வியன்பெருந் துருத்தித் திருவமர் மார்பன் கிடந்த வண்ணமும்

āyiram viritteḻu talaiyuṭai aruntiṟaṟ pāyaṟ paḷḷip palartoḻu tētta viritiraik kāviri viyaṉperu turuttit tiruvamar mārpaṉ kiṭanta vaṇṇamum

On a magnificent cot having a thousand heads spread out, worshipped and praised by many, in an islet surrounded by Kaveri with billowing waves, is the lying posture of the one who has Lakshmi sitting in his chest

— Cilappatikaram (book 11, lines 35–40)

The 17th canto of the epic extols the beauty and greatness of Vishnu. The epic states that "Vain are the ears which do not hear the glory of Rama who is Vishnu, vain are the eyes which do not see the dark-hued Lord, the great God, the Mayavan Vishnu, vain is the tongue that will not praise him who triumphed over the deceit of the foolish schemer Kamsa (Krishna), vain is the tongue which does not say ‘Narayana’". The epic also praises the various incarnations of Vishnu namely Rama, Krishna, Balarama, Lakshmana, Narasimha, Vamana, and others. It also mentions prominent Vaishnavite temples like the Ranganathaswamy Temple, Srirangam, Koodal Azhagar temple, Venkateswara Temple, Tirumala, and Kallalagar Temple.

Canto XVII of Cilappatikaram, Praise of Narayana
O wearer of the luxurious Tulasi garland When the host of the Devas praised you reverentially as the One Supreme Being, you, who could never know hunger, ate up the whole universe. Your mouth which swallowed thus the whole universe, ate by stealth the butter from the pot in the uri. Is it your maya? Deceptive indeed is your work. Vain is the tongue that will not praise Him who triumphed over the deceit of the foolish schemer Kamsa and who went as the messenger of the five Pandavas to the Hundred Kauravas, praised by the Devas in all four directions, to the accompaniment of Vedic chanting, Vain is the tongue which does not say ‘Narayana’

— V. R. Ramachandra Dikshitar

According to D. Dennis Hudson – a World Religions and Tamil literature scholar, the Cilappatikaram is the earliest and first complete Tamil reference to Pillai (Nila, Nappinnai, Radha), who is described in the epic as the cowherd lover of Krishna. The epic includes abundant stories and allusions to Krishna and his stories, which are also found in ancient Sanskrit Puranas. In the canto where Kannaki is waiting for Kovalan to return after selling her anklet to a Madurai merchant, she is in a village with cowgirls. These cowherd girls enact a dance, where one plays Mayavan (Krishna), another girl plays Tammunon (Balarama), while a third plays Pinnai (Radha). The dance begins with a song listing Krishna's heroic deeds and his fondness for Radha, then they dance where sage Narada plays music. Such scenes where cowgirls imitate Krishna's life story are also found in Sanskrit poems of Harivamsa and Vishnu Purana, both generally dated to be older than Cilappatikaram. The Tamil epic calls portions of it as vāla caritai nāṭaṅkaḷ, which mirrors the phrase balacarita nataka – dramas about the story of the child Krishna" – in the more ancient Sanskrit kavyas.

=== Kural ===
Kural is a classic Tamil language text consisting of 1,330 short couplets, or kurals, of seven words each. In the introductory chapters of the Kural, Valluvar cites Indra, the king of heaven, to exemplify the virtue of conquest over one's senses. According to Tamil Hindu scholars such as Parimelalakar, other concepts and teachings found in Valluvar's text and also found in Hindu texts include Vedas, gods (Trimurti), sattva, guṇa, munis and sadhus (renouncers), rebirth, affirmation of a primordial God, among others. According to Purnalingam Pillai, who is known for his critique of Brahminism, a rational analysis of the Valluvar's work suggests that he was a Hindu, and not a Jain. Similarly, J. J. Glazov, a Tamil literature scholar and the translator of the Kural text into the Russian language, sees "Thiruvalluvar as a Hindu by faith", according to a review by Kamil Zvelebil.

Valluvar's mentioning of God Maha Vishnu in couplets 610 and 1103 and Goddess Lakshmi in couplets 167, 408, 519, 565, 568, 616, and 617 hints at the Vaishnavite beliefs of Valluvar.

Example:-

குறள் 610: மடியிலா மன்னவன் எய்தும் அடியளந்தான் தாஅய தெல்லாம் ஒருங்கு.

Couplet Explanation: The king who never gives way to idleness will obtain entire possession of (the whole earth) passed over by Vishnu who measured (the worlds) with His foot. (Kural Number 610)

There are many more references which shows the Rama, Krishna, Parashurama, Vamana, Varaha and Narasimha in Cilappatikaram, Purananuru, Naṟṟiṇai and many other books.

== Temples ==
Of the 108 Divya Desams that are revered according to the Alvar saints, 106 are stated to exist on earth. Prominent among these Divya Desams are:

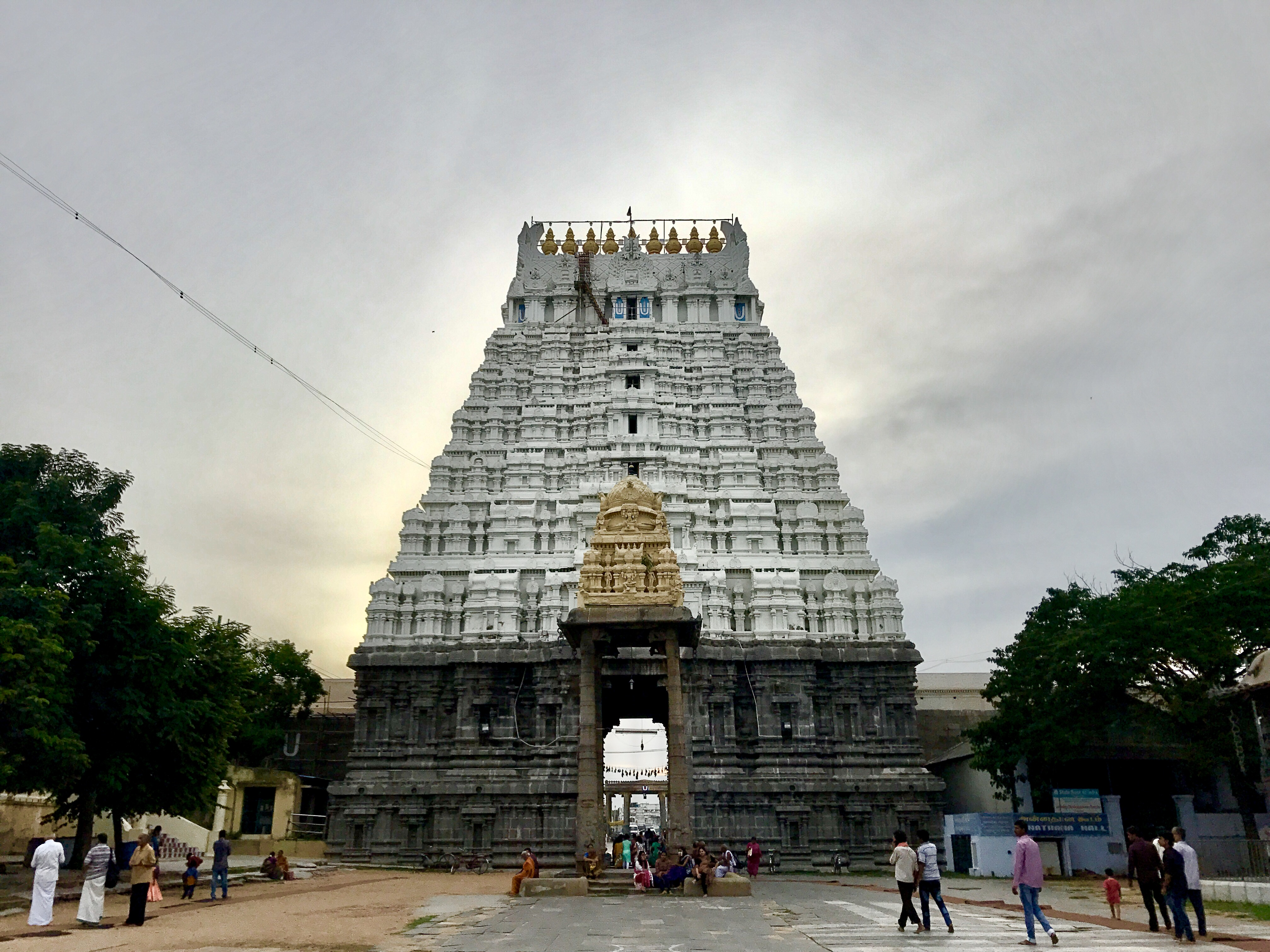
Varadharaja Perumal Temple, Kanchipuram

- Sri Navamukundan Temple in Thirunavaya, Kerala, India
- Sri Ananthapadmanabhaswamy Temple in Thiruvananthapuram, Kerala, India
- Sri Varadaraja Perumal temple in Kanchipuram, Tamil Nadu, India
- Sri Oppiliappan Perumal Temple near Kumbakonam, Tamil Nadu, India
- Sri Narasimha Perumal Temple in Ahobilam, India
- Sri Ranganathaswamy Temple in Srirangam, India
- Thirumaliruncholai (Kallazhagar Temple) in Madurai, India
- Thiruvengadam (Sri Venkateswara Temple), in Tirupati, India
- Aadhi Thiruvellarai (Pundarikakshan Temple) in Thiruvellarai, India.

=== Prominent Perumal Temples in India ===
- Sri Sathya-Narayana Perumal Temple in T-Nagar, Chennai, India
- Sri Srinivasa Perumal Temple (TTD), in T-Nagar, Chennai, India
- Sri Vinavaraya Perumal Temple, in Ambattur, Chennai, India
- Sri Santhana Srinivasa Perumal Kovil, in Mogappair, Chennai, India
- Udumalai Tirupathi, Dhali Road, Udumalpet, India

=== Malaysia ===
- Sri Sunderaraja Perumal Temple Klang, Malaysia
- Sri Alarmelamanga Samedha Shri Srinivasa Perumal Temple, Batu Caves, Selangor, Malaysia
- Sri Renganathar Temple, Kawasan Institusi Bangi, Kajang, Selangor, Malaysia
- Sri Varatharajah Perumal Temple, Persiaran Kewajipan, SS13, Subang Jaya, Selangor, Malaysia
- Sri Perumal Temple, Simpang Morib, Selangor, Malaysia
- Sri Srinivasa Perumal Temple Devastanam, Pusat Bandar Puchong, Selangor, Malaysia
- Hari Krishna Perumal Temple, Port Klang, Selangor, Malaysia
- Sri Krishna Temple, Brickfields, Kuala Lumpur, Malaysia
- Shree Lakshmi Narayan Mandir, Jalan Kasipillay, Kuala Lumpur, Malaysia

=== United States ===
- Malibu Hindu Temple, Calabasas, California, United States of America
- Balaji Temple, San Jose, California, United States of America
- Hindu Temple of Atlanta, Riverdale, Georgia, United States of America
- Sri Siva Vishnu Temple, Lanham, Maryland, United States of America
- Sri Venkateswara Temple, Bridgewater, New Jersey, United States of America
- Sri Venkateswara Temple, Cary, North Carolina, United States of America
- Sri Venkateswara Temple, Pittsburgh, Pennsylvania, United States of America

=== Singapore ===
- Sri Srinivasa Perumal Temple, Singapore

=== Sri Lanka ===
- Sri Venkateswara Temple, Colombo, Sri Lanka
- Vishnu Devalaya, Kandy, Sri Lanka
- Devinuwara Devalaya, Dondra, Sri Lanka
- Vallipuram Alwar Temple, Vallipuram, Sri Lanka

== See also ==
- Vishnu
- Ranganatha
- Venkateswara
