= Tamil onomatopoeia =

Tamil language

Tamil onomatopoeia refers to the Tamil language words that phonetically imitates, resembles or suggests the source of the sound that it describes. The rules of Tamil onomatopoeia are laid down in the grammar book Tolkāppiyam from Sangam literature.

== Types ==
There are two types of onomatopoeia described in Tamil namely, இரட்டைக் கிளவி ("irattai k-kilavi") and அடுக்குத் தொடர் ("atukku th-thodar").

=== ("irattai k-kilavi") ===
Irattai kilavi consists of two words paired with one another which does not give a stand alone meaning when separated (an example is 'துறுதுறு' in 'துறுதுறு என்ற விழிகள்'). In the second book of Tolkāppiyam, the first chapter of Kilāviyakkam describes:

இரட்டைக் கிளவி இரட்டின் பிரித்து இகைய
irattaik kilavi irattin piritu icaiya
doubled word from its doubling does not stand

There are three types of doublets described. In the first type, a single word with an adjectival quality is repeated while in the second type, the word may be nominal or verbal. The third type consists of two words with opposite meanings coupled with each other.

=== ("atukku th-thodar") ===
Atukku thodar consists of two words stacked after one another which give a different meaning when separated (an example is 'பிடி பிடி பிடி').
