= Ainkurunuru =

Classical Tamil poetic work

Ainkurunuru (Tamil: ஐங்குறுநூறு, Aiṅkuṟunūṟu meaning five hundred short poems) is a classical Tamil poetic work and traditionally the third of the Eight Anthologies (Ettuthokai) in the Sangam literature. It is divided into five groups of 100 short stanzas of 3 to 6 lines, each hundred subdivided into 10s, or pattu. The five groups are based on tinai (landscapes): riverine, sea coast, mountain, arid and pastoral. According to Martha Selby, the love poems in Ainkurunuru are generally dated from about the late-2nd-to-3rd-century-CE (Sangam period). According to Takanobu Takahashi – a Tamil literature scholar, these poems were likely composed between 300 and 350 CE based on the linguistic evidence, while Kamil Zvelebil – another Tamil literature scholar – suggests the Ainkurunuru poems were composed by 210 CE, with some of the poems dated to 100 BCE.

The Ainkurunuru anthology manuscript includes a colophon which states it to be a Chera (Kerala) text, rather than the more common Pandyan kingdom-based. The poems in this book were written by five authors and were compiled by Kudalur Kilar at the behest of Chera King Yanaikkatcey Mantaran Ceral Irumporai.

== Style and contents ==
This book comes under the Akam (love and emotions) category of the Sangam literature. The poems of this anthology are in the Akaval meter. These poems deal with the various aspects of the courtship between the hero and the heroine. The poems are set in various landscapes (Tinai - திணை).

Each poem is subdivided and formatted into pattu or tens, a style found in much of Tamil literature such as Tirukkural, Bhakti movement poetry and elsewhere. This may have been, according to Zvelebil, a Sanskrit literature (sataka style) influence on this work. However, the poetry shows relatively few loan words from Sanskrit. The Ainkurunuru has allusions to 17 historical events and offers some window into early Tamil society. For example, it mentions the kutumi, or the "pigtail of Brahmin boys".

== Sections and authors ==
The work is divided into five sections by different authors:

1. Marutam – 100 poems on jealous quarrelling, by Ōrampōkiyār
2. Neytal – 100 poems on lamenting the lover's absence, by Ammuvaṉār
3. Kuṟiñci – 100 poems on union of lovers, by Kapilar
4. Pālai – 100 poems on separation, by Otalānraiyār
5. Mullai – 100 poems on patient waiting for the lover's return, by Pēyaṉār

The invocation song at the start of the anthology was written by Perunthevanaar, who translated the Mahabharatham into Tamil.

== Publication and commentary ==
The text was published by U. V. Swaminatha Aiyar, along with a detailed commentary. A short commentary on Ainkurunuru anthology was published in the medieval anonymously.

== Example ==
Poem 255:

Original

குன்றக் குறவன் காதல் மடமகள்
வரையர மகளிர்ப் புரையுஞ் சாயலள்
ஐயள் அரும்பிய முலையள்
செய்ய வாயினள் மார்பினள் சுணங்கே.

Transliteration:

Kuṉṟak kuṟavaṉ kātal maṭamakaḷ
Varaiyara makaḷirp puraiyuñ cāyalaḷ
Aiyaḷ arumpiya mulaiyaḷ
Ceyya vāyiṉaḷ mārpiṉaḷ cuṇaṅkē

Translation:

The loving young daughter
of the hill man
is as beautiful
as a mountain goddess.
She is gorgeous
with her sprouting breasts,
her reddened lips,
and her mottled chest.

– Translator: Martha Ann Selby

== See also ==
- Eight Anthologies
- Eighteen Greater Texts
- Sangam literature
