= Eight Anthologies =

Classical Tamil poetic work

The Eight Anthologies, known as Eṭṭuttokai (Tamil: எட்டுத்தொகை) or "Eight Collections" in the literature, is a classical Tamil poetic work that forms part of the Eighteen Greater Texts (Patiṉeṇmēlkaṇakku) anthology series of the Sangam Literature. The Eight Anthologies and its companion anthology, the Ten Idylls (Pattuppāṭṭu), is the oldest available Tamil literature. According to Kamil Zvelebil, a scholar of Tamil literature and history, dating these Eight Anthologies or their relative chronology is difficult, but the scholarship so far suggested that the earliest layers were composed sometime between the 1st century BCE and 2nd century CE, while the last layers were completed between 3rd and 5th century CE.

== Contents of the anthologies ==
The Eight Anthologies consist of 2,371 poems varying from small stanzas of three lines in Ainkurnuru to stanzas of forty lines in Purananuru. The following poems form the Eight Anthologies:

- Ainkurunuru (ஐங்குறுநூறு)
- Akananuru (அகநானூறு)
- Purananuru (புறநானூறு)
- Kalittokai (கலித்தொகை)
- Kuruntokai (குறுந்தொகை)
- Natrinai (நற்றிணை)
- Paripatal (பரிபாடல்)
- Pathitrupathu (பதிற்றுப்பத்து)

This compilation of eight anthologies into the Ettuttokai super-anthology is historic. It is attested to in a mnemonic Tamil venpa stanza, likely composed sometime at a much later date after the 5th-century. The stanza is found in the colophons of many of the surviving palm-leaf manuscripts, and confirms the cherished status of this Sangam collection in the Tamil history. This stanza aid reads:

Original Tamil:

நற்றிணை நல்ல குறுந்தொகை ஐங்குறுநூறு
ஒத்த பதிற்றுப்பத்து ஓங்கு பரிபாடல்
கற்றறிந்தார் ஏத்தும் கலியோடு அகம்புறம் என்று
இத்திறத்த எட்டுத் தொகை

— Palm-leaf manuscript UVSL 885 (GOML R-5780) colophon

Translation:

Naṟṟiṇai, good Kuṟuntokai, Aiṅkuṟunūṟu,
even Patiṟṟuppattu, high Paripāṭal,
along with Kali, Akam, [and] Puṟam praised by learned
knowledgeable people, these parts [form] the Eṭṭuttokai

— Translator: Eva Wilden

== Date ==
Tamil tradition mentions academies of poets that composed classical literature over thousands of years before the common era, a belief that scholars consider a myth. Some scholars date the Sangam literature between c. 300 BCE and 300 CE, while others variously place this early classical Tamil literature period a bit later and more narrowly but mostly before 300 CE. According to Kamil Zvelebil – a Tamil literature and history scholar, the most acceptable range for the majority of Sangam literature is 100 BCE to 250 CE, based on the linguistic, prosodic and quasi-historic allusions within the texts and the colophons. Some of the later strata of the Sangam literature, including the Eight Anthologies, is approximately from the 3rd to 5th century CE. (Note: Herman Tieken has challenged this chronology based on internal evidence within the poems, and external evidence such as inscriptions on coins and stones. According to Tieken, the Sangam literature should be dated after 3rd-century CE, more in the second half of the 1st-millennium of the common era, and close to when they were compiled into anthologies. Some scholarly reviewers such as Whitney Cox find Tieken's arguments persuasive. David Shulman in his 2016 published Tamil: A Biography states that Tieken's analysis is sound and the chronology proposals for the Sangam period literature in the past were based on generous interpretation of the Sangam poems, but the critical study of Tieken only confirms that Sangam literature cannot be "dated definitively with the information we have available". Shulman disagrees with some conclusions of the Tieken's analysis.)

=== Rediscovery ===
The Ettuttokai along with other Sangam literature had fallen into oblivion for much of the 2nd millennium of the common era, but were preserved by and rediscovered in the monasteries of Hinduism, particularly those related to Shaivism near Kumbakonam. These rediscovered palm-leaf (Tamil: olai, Sanskrit: talapatra) manuscripts were published by the colonial era scholars in late 19th century.

== Authors ==
There are 470 poets known either by their proper names or by causal names deduced from their works. The authors are unidentified in the case of a hundred stanzas. The poets belonged to different parts of Tamil Nadu and to different professions.

Some of them were very popular like Kabilar, Nakkirar and Avvaiyaar and some others are rarely remembered by their names. Yet a general harmony prevails throughout these eight anthologies. The tone and temper of the age is reflected in all their poems with a singular likeness. They were moulded according to certain literary conventions or traditions that prevailed in the Sangam age. Yet they reveal the individual genius of the poets who sang them.

== Examples ==
The Sangam literature is categorized into two: love or inner (Akam) or public life or outer (Puram).

குறிஞ்சி – தலைவன் கூற்று
கவவுக் கடுங்குரையள் காமர் வனப்பினள்
குவவுமென் முலையள் கொடிக்கூந் தலளே
யாங்குமறந் தமைகோ யானே ஞாங்கர்க்
கடுஞ்சுரை நல்லா னடுங்குதலைக் குழவி
தாய்காண் விருப்பி னன்ன
சாஅய்நோக் கினளே மாஅ யோளே

—சிறைக்குடியாந்தையார். (குறுந்தொகை – 132)

A girl of dark complexion is she
Ever ready to embrace,
desirable in beauty,
with delicately bulging breasts
and long flowing hair!
How can I forget her and be at rest?
In her look is such longing
as in the look of a new-born tender calf
that longs to see its mother whose udders are ready to flow!

—Siraikkudiyaanndhayaar. (Kurunthogai – 132)

A verse from the 69th poem of Akanaṉūṟu :

"விண்பொரு நெடுவரை இயல் தேர் மோரியர்

பொன் புனை திகிரி திரிதர குறைத்த

அறை இறந்து அகன்றனர் ஆயினும், எனையதூஉம்

நீடலர் வாழி தோழி!"

The verse speaks about the elegant chariots on which the Mauryans rode through mountains and valleys and are referred to as "moriyar". These anthologies are significant source of cultural and historic information about ancient Tamil Nadu and South India.

=== Akaval metre ===
Of the eight anthologies five are on Agam, two on Puram, and one on both. Six of them are in 'agaval' metre which is a kind of verse, interspersed with alliterations and rhymes. The poems on Agam as well as Puram theme are written in this metre and its regulated and subtle music adds to the poetic beauty. This metre is a simple but wonderful instrument, which causes no impediment to the freedom of expression of the poet. It has been found to be an appropriate and natural medium for the expression of the valuable experience of the poets.

=== Kali metres ===
The other two anthologies that are not written in agaval metre are Kaliththogai and Paripaatal. The poems of Kaliththogai are in Kali metre which is known for its dramatic and lyrical qualities and which, according to Tolkappiyam is well suited to express the emotions of the lovers. There is repetition of certain lines and phrases and this, added to the haunting music of the metre, is very appealing.

=== Paripaadal metre ===
Paripaadal is a metre full of rhythm and music and the anthology known by this name consists of songs composed in this metre. There are religious poems as well as those on love-themes. The love-theme is worked against the background of bathing festivities. These songs were sung in different tunes as is evident from the notes on the music at the end of these. The names of the musicians who set tunes to these songs are also mentioned therein.

== Religion in the Eight Anthologies ==
In general, the texts are non-religious, mostly about love, longing, bardic praise of the king, chieftain or patron and such topics. They occasionally mention reverence or include lines alluding to Hindu gods (particularly Murugan), goddesses, Vedas, Puranic legends and temples. The Paripaatal is a notable exception. This is a collection of devotional poems (bhakti), which are set to music and written primarily about Thirumal (Vishnu), Murugan and the river Vaigai.

== See also ==
- Eighteen Greater Texts
- Sangam literature
