= Paripāṭal =

Classic anthology of Tamil literature

The Paripādal (Tamil: பரிபாடல், meaning the paripadal-metre anthology) is a classical Tamil poetic work and traditionally the fifth of the Eight Anthologies (Ettuthokai) in the Sangam literature. According to Tolkappiyam, Paripadal is a kind of verse dealing only with love (akapporul) and does not fall under the general classification of verses. It has a minimum of 25 lines and a maximum of 400 lines. It is an "akam genre", odd and hybrid collection which expresses love in the form of religious devotion (Bhakti) to gods and goddesses predominantly to Mayon and Murugan. According to Kamil Zvelebil, a Tamil literature and history scholar. This is the only anthology in the Eight Anthologies collection that is predominantly religious, though the other seven anthologies do contain occasional mentions and allusions to gods, goddesses and legends.

== Date ==
According to S. Vaiyapuri Pillai, former Reader of the University of Madras, has stated that Paripadal may belong to the 3rd or 4th century period as Madurai was called Nan-Mada-k-koodal during the reign of Abisheka Pandya, who ruled the Pandya country in the 3rd or 4th century CE. Hence, Paripadal which praises Koodal (Koodal Azhagar temple) may belong to the 3rd or 4th century CE.

== Contents ==
Paripāṭal currently has 24 survived and in that seven are dedicated to Mayon, eight to Murugan and nine to Vaigai. The poems of Mayon show his supremacy, and gives him the status Creator. He is regarded to be the only deity who enjoyed the status of Paramporul (achieving a oneness with Creator) during the Sangam age. He is also known as Māyavan, Māmiyon, Netiyōn, and Māl in Sangam literature. A reference to "Mukkol Pakavars" in Sangam literature indicates that only Panar saints were holding prominent during the period. Mayon was glorified as "the supreme deity", whose divine lotus feet could burn all evil and grant Salvation. During the post-Sangam period, his worship was further glorified by the poet-saints called the Alvars.

== Description ==
The Tamil tradition believes that the Paripāṭal anthology originally contained 70 poems, of which 24 have survived in full and few others have survived in fragments into the modern era as evidenced by the quotes in the Tolkappiyam and the Purattirattu. Of the 24 full poems that have survived, 7 are dedicated to Tirumal (Krishna, Vishnu), eight to Murugan, and nine to river goddess Vaikai. The nine river-related poems mention bathing festivals (Magh Mela), as well as water sports, offerings of prayers at the river banks, playful lover's quarrel where the wife accuses her husband of bathing with his mistress.

The compilation is attributed to 13 poets, and each poem has a notable colophon. In these colophons, in addition to the poet's name is included the music and tune (melodic mode, raga) for the poem, as well as the composer of that music. The Paripatal poems are longer than the poems in other major Sangam anthologies. The typical poems have 60 lines, and the longest surviving poem has 140 lines. Like the Kalittokai anthology, this collection also includes dialogue-based poems. Beyond the 24 surviving poems, from the fragmentary records about the other 46 original poems, 1 additional poem was to Tirumal, 23 more to Murugan, 1 to Kottravai, 17 more to Vaikai and 4 to Madurai. The Tirumal devotional poems are the earliest and described in most Poetic terms.

The Paripatal manuscripts suggest that it was not purely an abstract literary work, rather a guide for devotional songs to be sung. The poems also mention temples and shrines, thereby suggesting that the Tamil people had already built temples for Mayon and Murugan in the Sangam era. The Paripatal anthology is likely a late Sangam literature, states Zvelebil, separated from the earliest Sangam work by at least three centuries. This is evidenced by the linguistic and grammatical innovations, and its mention of mural paintings in temples and other cultural innovations. Takanobu Takahashi concurs that this is a late Sangam work, and adds that the poems were likely composed over several generations over 100–150 years (3rd century CE). A. K. Ramanujan suggests this Sangam anthology may be from about the 6th century. The poems allude to many pan-Indian legends, such as the samudra manthan (churning of cosmic ocean), Vishnu devotee Prahlada's struggle, Shiva and Murugan legends. The Paripatal collection may be the early buds of transitional poems that flowered into the Bhakti movement poetry.

According to V. N. Muthukumar and Elizabeth Rani Segran, the Vishnu devotional poems in the Paripatal are some of "earliest and finest representations of devotional genre", while the poems dedicated to Vaikai (Vaiyai) river are "unbriddled celebration of sensuality and love". The first Tamil edition of Paripatal from palm-leaf manuscripts discovered in 19th century was published by U. V. Swaminatha Iyer in 1918. A French translation was published in 1968 by François Gros. English translations of the collection has been published by Seshadri, Hikosaka et al. in 1996, as well as partly by Muthukumar and Segram in 2012.

== Examples ==
There are two poems depicted as example, one in the praise of Maha Vishnu and other of Murugan

To Tirumal (Vishnu):

தீயினுள் தெறல் நீ;
பூவினுள் நாற்றம் நீ;
கல்லினுள் மணியும் நீ;
சொல்லினுள் வாய்மை நீ;
அறத்தினுள் அன்பு நீ;
மறத்தினுள் மைந்து நீ;
வேதத்து மறை நீ;
பூதத்து முதலும் நீ;
வெஞ் சுடர் ஒளியும் நீ;
திங்களுள் அளியும் நீ;
அனைத்தும் நீ;
அனைத்தின் உட்பொருளும் நீ;

— Paripadal, iii: 63-68
Translation:

In fire, you are the heat;
in blossoms, the fragrance;
among the stones, you are the diamond;
in speech, truth;
among virtues, you are love;
in valour—strength;
in the Veda, you are the secret;
among elements, the primordial;
in the burning sun, the light;
in moonshine, its sweetness;
you are all,
and you are the substance and meaning of all.

— F Gros, K Zvelebil

To Murugan:

We pray you not for wealth,
not for gold, not for pleasure;
But for your grace, for love, for virtue,
these three,
O god with the rich garland of kaṭampu flowers
with rolling clusters!

– Pari. v.: 78–81

== See also ==
- Ancient Tamil music
- Eight Anthologies
- Eighteen Greater Texts
- Sangam literature
