= Tamil literature =

South-Indian Literature by language

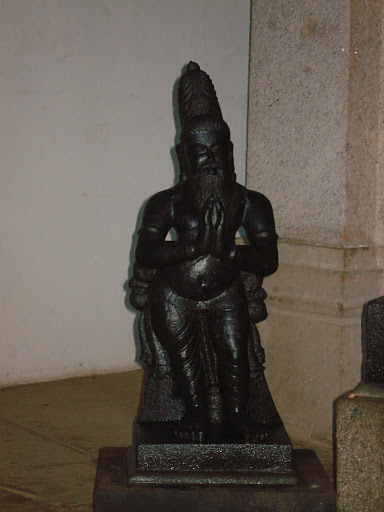
Sage Agastya, Chairman of the first Tamil Sangam, Madurai, Pandiya Kingdom. Statue in Tamil Thai temple, Karaikudi, Tamil Nadu.

Tamil literature includes a collection of literary works that have come from a tradition spanning more than two thousand years. The oldest extant works show signs of maturity indicating an even longer period of evolution. Contributors to the Tamil literature are mainly from Tamil people from south India, including the land now comprising Tamil Nadu, Kerala, Eelam Tamils from Sri Lanka, as well as the Tamil diaspora.

The history of Tamil literature follows the history of Tamil Nadu, closely following the social, economical, political and cultural trends of various periods. The early Sangam literature, dated before 300 BCE, contain anthologies of various poets dealing with many aspects of life, including love, war, social values and religion. This was followed by the post-sangam instructional works, such as the Thirukkural, and narrative epics including Cilappatikaram and Manimekalai. These compositions drew upon indigenous Tamil conventions alongside Vedic and Puranic traditions. Between the 6th and 9th centuries CE, hymns composed by the Shaiva Nayanars and Vaishnava Alvars initiated the Bhakti movement, which spread across the Indian subcontinent. During the medieval era some of the grandest of Tamil literary classics like Kambaramayanam and Periya Puranam were authored and many poets were patronized by the imperial Chola and Pandya empires. The later medieval period saw many assorted minor literary works and also contributions by a few Muslim and European authors.

A revival of Tamil literature took place from the late 19th century when works of religious and philosophical nature were written in a style that made it easier for the common people to enjoy. The modern Tamil literary movement started with Subramania Bharathi, the multifaceted Indian nationalist poet and author, and was quickly followed up by many who began to utilize the power of literature in influencing the masses. With growth of literacy, Tamil prose began to blossom and mature. Short stories and novels began to appear. Modern Tamil literary criticism also evolved. The popularity of Tamil cinema has also interacted with Tamil literature in some mutually enriching ways.

== Sangam age ==
Sangam literature comprises some of the oldest extant Tamil literature, and deals with love, traditions, war, governance, trade and bereavement. Unfortunately much of the Tamil literature belonging to the Sangam period has been lost. The literature currently available from this period is perhaps just a fraction of the wealth of material produced during this golden age of Tamil civilization. The core corpus historically classified as Sangam literature consists of the Eighteen Greater Text Series (Pathinenmaelkanakku), comprising the Eight Anthologies (Ettuthokai) and the Ten Idylls (Pattupattu), alongside the grammatical treatise Tolkaappiyam. The narrative epics, such as the Five Great Epics (Aimperumkāppiyam), were composed in subsequent centuries during the post-sangam period, representing a distinct phase in Tamil literary history.

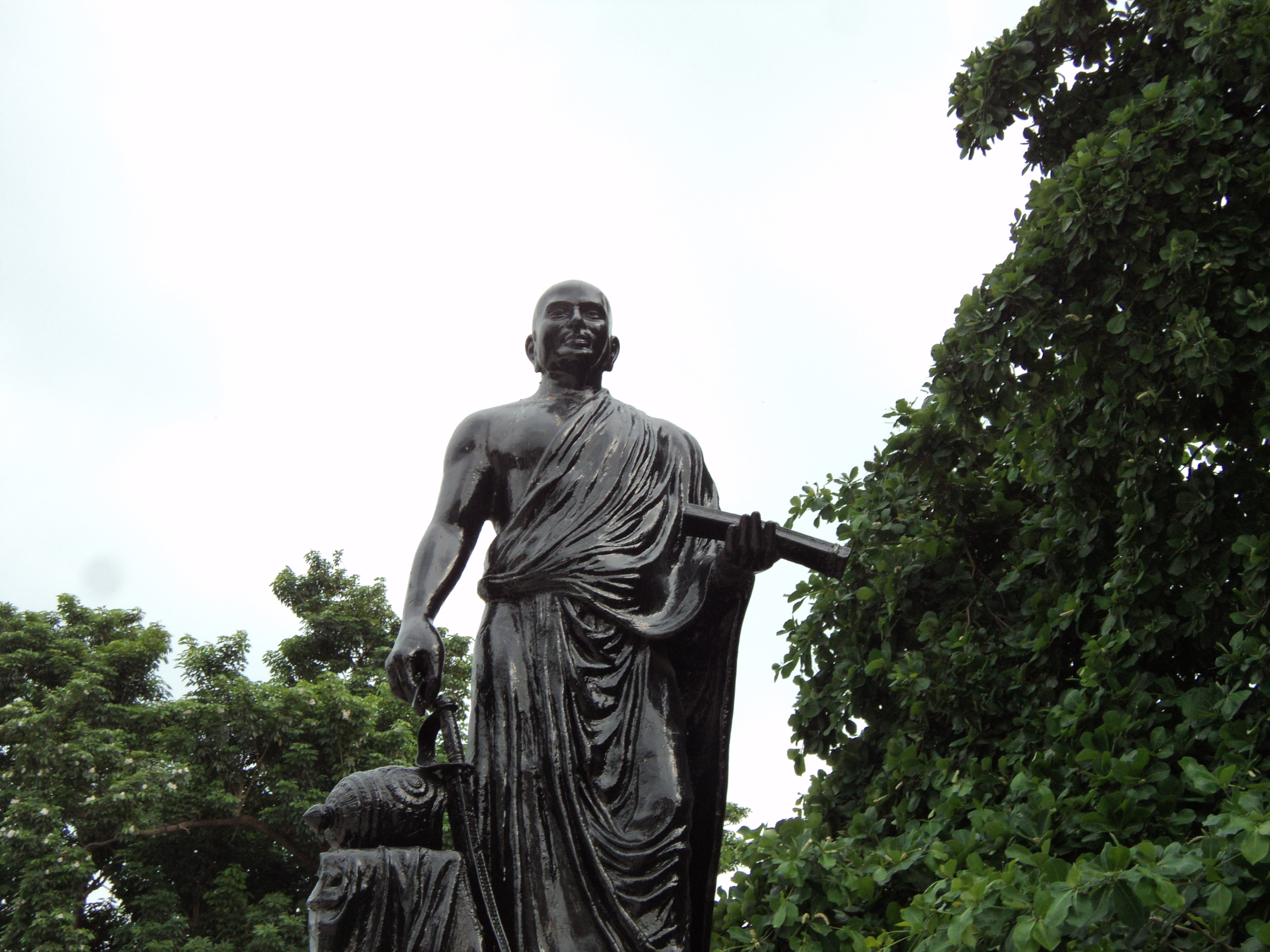
Ilango Adigal (c. 100 CE) wrote Silappathikaaram, one of the Five great epics.

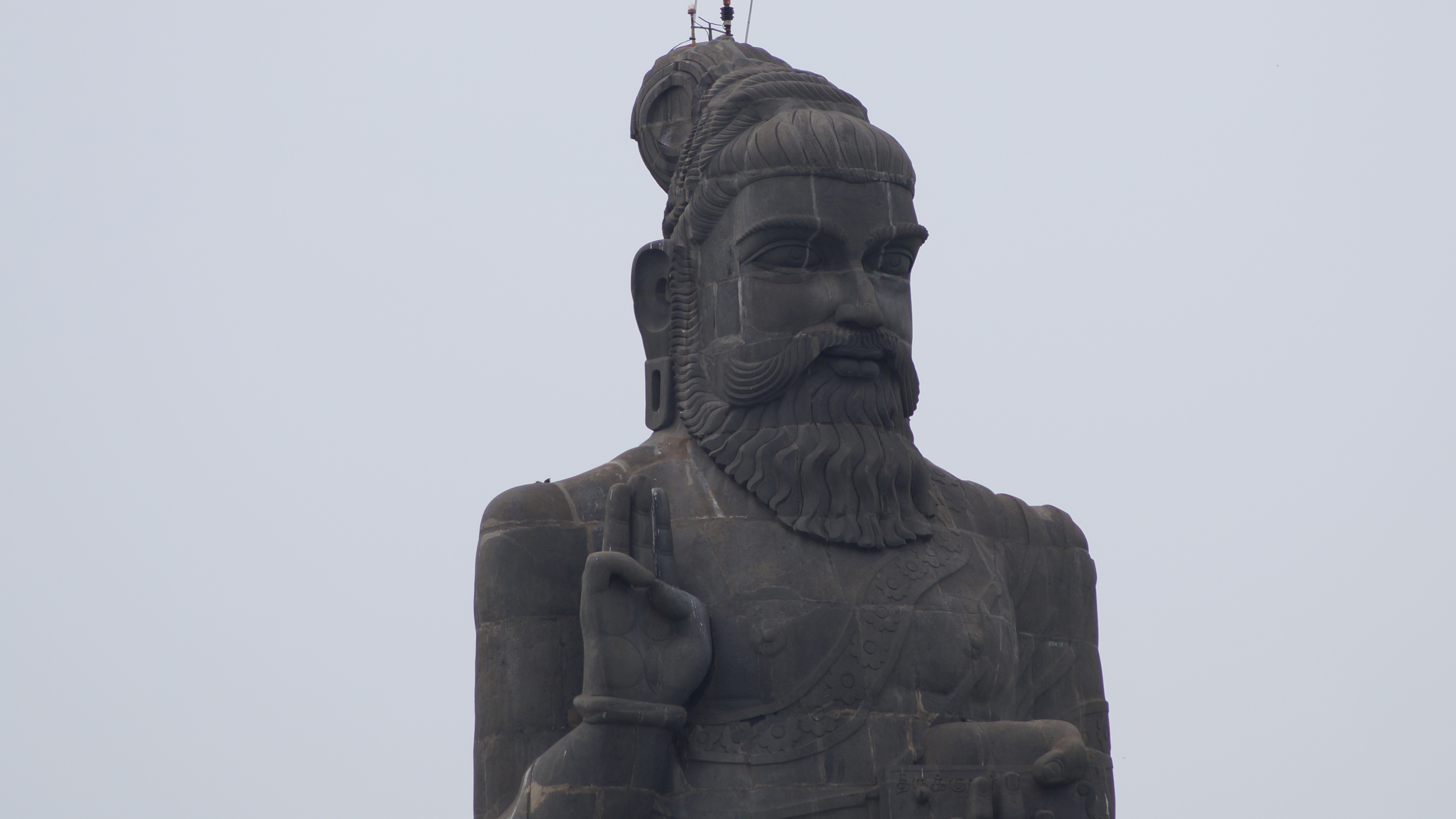
Thiruvalluvar wrote Thirukkural (c. 300s BCE), taught in schools today.

குறிஞ்சி – தலைவன் கூற்று
யாயும் ஞாயும் யாரா கியரோ
எந்தையும் நுந்தையும் எம்முறைக் கேளிர்
யானும் நீயும் எவ்வழி யறிதும்
செம்புலப் பெயனீர் போல
அன்புடை நெஞ்சம் தாங்கலந் தனவே.
-செம்புலப் பெயனீரார்.

— (Kuruntokai – 40), a poem from the Eight Anthologies
Translation:

Red earth and pouring rain
What could my mother be to yours?
What kin is my father to yours anyway?
And how
Did you and I meet ever?
But in love our hearts have mingled
like red earth and pouring rain.

— Translated by A. K. Ramanujan

Tamil legends hold that these were composed in three successive poetic assemblies (Sangam) that were held in ancient times on a now vanished continent far to the south of India. A significant amount of literature could have preceded Tolkappiyam as grammar books are usually written after the existence of literature over long periods. Tamil tradition holds the earliest Sangam poetry to be over twelve millennia old. Modern linguistic scholarship places the poems between the 3rd century BCE and the 2nd century CE.

The Sangam age is considered by the Tamil people as the golden era of the Tamil language. This was the period when the Tamil country was ruled by the three 'crowned kings' the Cheras, Pandyas, and the Cholas. The land was at peace with no major external threats. Ashoka's conquests had no impact on the Tamil land and the people were able to indulge in literary pursuits. The poets had a much more casual relationship with their rulers than can be imagined in later times. They could chide them when they are perceived to wander from the straight and narrow. The greatness of the Sangam age poetry may be ascribed not so much to its antiquity, but due to the fact that their ancestors were indulging in literary pursuits and logical classification of the habitats and society in a systematic manner with little to draw from precedents domestically or elsewhere. The fact that these classifications were documented at a very early date in the grammatical treatise Tolkappiyam, demonstrates the organized manner in which the Tamil language has evolved. Tolkappiyam is not merely a textbook on Tamil grammar giving the inflection and syntax of words and sentences but also includes classification of habitats, animals, plants and human beings. The discussion on human emotions and interactions is particularly significant. Tolkappiyam is divided into three chapters: orthography, etymology and subject matter (Porul). While the first two chapters of Tolkappiyam help codify the language, the last part, Porul refers to the people and their behavior. The grammar helps to convey the literary message on human behavior and conduct, and uniquely merges the language with its people.

The literature was classified into the broad categories of 'subjective' (akam) and 'objective' (puram) topics to enable the poetic minds to discuss any topic under the sun, from grammar to love, within the framework of well prescribed, socially accepted conventions.

Recognizing that human activities cannot take place in vacuum and are constantly influenced by environmental factors, human experiences, in general, and subjective topics in particular, are assigned to specific habitats. Accordingly, land was classified into five genres (thinai): mullai (forests), kurinji (mountainous regions), marutham (agricultural lands), neithal (seashore), paalai (wasteland). The images associated with these landscapes – birds, beasts, flowers, gods, music, people, weather, seasons – were used to subtly convey a mood, associated with an aspect of life. Kuruntokai, a collection of poems belonging to the Ettuthokai anthology demonstrates an early treatment of the Sangam landscape. Such treatments are found to be much refined in the later works of Akananuru and Paripaatal. Paripaatal takes its name from the musical Paripaatal meter utilised in these poems. This is the first instance of a work set to music. Akaval and kalippa were the other popular meters used by poets during the Sangam age.

=== Religion in the Sangam age ===
Religion in the Sangam age was an important reason for the increase in Tamil literature. Ancient Tamils primarily followed the Vaishnavism tradition (which considered Vishnu as the supreme deity) and Kaumaram (who worshiped Murugan as the supreme god). According to Kamil Zvelebil, Vishnu was considered ageless (the god who stays forever) and was regarded as the supreme god of Tamils, whereas Skanda was considered to be young and was regarded as a personal god of Tamils.

Religious themes in Sangam literature reflect an integration of regional landscapes with wider classical Indian theology. The Tolkāppiyam links particular deities to each landscape, Tinai. Māyōn (identified with Krishna-Vishnu) with Mullai, Cēyōn (Murugan) with Kuruñci, Vēntan (associated with Indra) with Marutam, and Varuna with Neythal. Anthologies such as the Purananuru (a classical Tamil poetic work and traditionally the fifth of the Eight Anthologies) and Paripādal (Tamil: பரிபாடல், meaning the paripadal-metre anthology) contain verses addressing deities through descriptive Tamil epithets rather than formal Sanskrit designations. Deities praised include Māyōṉ, Cēyōṉ, Valiyōṉ (Balarama), and the three-eyed divinity seated beneath the banyan tree (Shiva, referenced as Mukkaṇ-celvan or Ālamar-kaṭavuḷ). According to Tolkāppiyam, Paripadal is a kind of verse dealing only with love (akapporul) and does not fall under the general classification of verses. Sangam literature (200 BCE to 500 CE) mentions Mayon or the "dark one", as the supreme deity who creates, sustains, and destroys the universe and was worshipped in the Plains and mountains of Tamilakam.The earliest verses of Paripadal describe the glory of Perumal in the most poetic of terms. Many poems of the Paripadal consider Perumal as the supreme god of Tamils. He is regarded to be the only deity who enjoyed the status of Paramporul (achieving oneness with Paramatma) during the Sangam age. He is also known as Māyavan, Māmiyon, Netiyōn, and Māl in Sangam literature and considered as the most mentioned god in the Sangam literature.

Cēyōṉ "the red one", who is identified with Murugan, whose name is literally Murukaṉ ("the youth") in the Tolkāppiyam; extant works of Sangam literature, dated between the third century BCE and the fifth century CE, glorified Murugan, "the red god seated on the blue peacock, who is ever young and resplendent", as "the favoured god of the Tamils". There are no mentions of Shiva in Tolkappiyam. Shiva and Brahma are said to be forms of Maha Vishnu and considers Vishnu as the supreme god in Paripāṭal. The poems also record kings conducting Vedic sacrifices (Vēlvi) supported by Brahmin scholars, illustrating continuity with Pan-Indian religious practices during the period.

There are two poems depicted as example of Bhakti in ancient Tamil Nadu, one in the praise of Maha Vishnu and other of Murugan.

To Tirumal (Maha Vishnu):

தீயினுள் தெறல் நீ;
பூவினுள் நாற்றம் நீ;
கல்லினுள் மணியும் நீ;
சொல்லினுள் வாய்மை நீ;
அறத்தினுள் அன்பு நீ;
மறத்தினுள் மைந்து நீ;
வேதத்து மறை நீ;
பூதத்து முதலும் நீ;
வெஞ் சுடர் ஒளியும் நீ;
திங்களுள் அளியும் நீ;
அனைத்தும் நீ;
அனைத்தின் உட்பொருளும் நீ;

— Paripadal, iii: 63-68
Translation:

In fire, you are the heat;
in blossoms, the fragrance;
among the stones, you are the diamond;
in speech, truth;
among virtues, you are love;
in valour—strength;
in the Veda, you are the secret;
among elements, the primordial;
in the burning sun, the light;
in moonshine, its sweetness;
you are all,
and you are the substance and meaning of all.

— F Gros, K Zvelebil

To Seyyon (Skandha):

We pray you not for wealth,
not for gold, not for pleasure;
But for your grace, for love, for virtue,
these three,
O god with the rich garland of kaṭampu flowers
with rolling clusters!

– Pari. v.: 78–81

The other gods also referred to in the Tolkappiyam are Vēntaṉ "the sovereign" (identified with Indra) and Korravai "the victorious" (identified with Durga) and Varunan "the sea god".

== Post-Sangam period ==
=== Didactic age ===
The period following the Sangam era (c. 300–600 CE) is characterized by the production of didactic and ethical works, classified as Eighteen Lesser Text series (Pathinenkilkanakku). This era coincided with political shifts across Tamilakam, including the rule of the Kalabhra dynasty. Earlier colonial-era histography often characterized this transition as a 'dark age'. Howvever, subsequent epigrahic and literary studies show that it was an active period of literary output. This period also saw inter-religious dialogue among Jain, Buddhist, Shaivaite and Vaishnavite traditions.

எப்பொருள் யார்யார்வாய்க் கேட்பினும் அப்பொருள்
மெய்ப்பொருள் காண்ப தறிவு.
"The mark of wisdom is to discern the truth
From whatever source it is heard."
– (Tirukkural – 423)

The best known of these works on ethics is the Tirukkural by Thiruvalluvar. The book is a comprehensive manual of ethics, polity and love, containing 1,330 distichs or kural divided into chapters of ten distichs each: the first thirty-eight on ethics, the next seventy on polity and the remainder on love.

Other famous works of this period are Kaḷavaḻi Nāṟpatu, Nalatiyar, Inna Narpathu and Iniyavai Narpathu. The Jain texts Nalatiyar and Pazhamozhi Nanuru each consist of four hundred poems, each of which cites a proverb and then illustrates it with a story.

=== Devotional period ===
The fall of the Kalabhras around 500 CE saw a reaction from the thus suppressed Hindus. The Kalabhras were replaced by the Pandyas in the south and by the Pallavas in the north. Even with the exit of the Kalabhras, the Jain and Buddhist influence still remained in Tamil Nadu. The early Pandya and the Pallava kings were followers of these faiths. The Hindu reaction to this apparent decline of their religion was growing and reached its peak during the later part of the 7th century. There was a widespread Hindu revival during which a huge body of Vaishnava and Saiva literature was created. Many Vaishnava Alvars provided a great stimulus to the growth of popular devotional literature. Vaishnava Alvars were producing devotional hymns and their songs were collected later into the Four Thousand Sacred Hymns (Naalayira Divyap Prabhandham) by Nathamunigal. It is considered as the Tamil Vedam equal to the Sanskrit vedas. The three earliest Alvars were Poigai Alvar, Bhoothath Alvar and Pey Alvar. Each of these wrote one hundred Venpas on the glory of Maha Vishnu in Tirukoilur. Tirumalisai Alwar who was a contemporary of the Pallava Mahendravarman I wrote such works as Naanmugantiruvadiandadi. Tirumangai Alvar who lived in the 8th century CE was a more prolific writer and his works constitute about a third of the Diyaprabhandam. Periyalvar and his adopted daughter Andal contributed nearly 650 hymns to the Vaishnava canon. Andal symbolised purity and love for the God and wrote her hymns addressing Vishnu as a lover. The hymn of Andal which starts with Vaaranam Aayiram (One Thousand Elephants) tells of her dream wedding to Vishnu and is sung even today at Tamil Vaishnava weddings. Nammalvar, who lived in the 9th century, wrote Tiruvaimoli. It comprises 1,101 stanzas and is held in great esteem for its elucidation of the Upanishads. This corpus was collected by Nathamuni, around 950 CE and formed the classical and vernacular basis for Sri Vaishnavism. These hymns Naalayira Divya Prabhandham is respected at par with Vedas by Sri Vaishnavites in sanctity and holiness and hence referred to as Dravida Vedam or Tamil Vedam.

Along with the Vaishnava Alvars, Many Saiva Nayanmars were also producing devotional hymns and their songs were collected later into Periya Puranam. Karaikal Ammaiyar who lived in the 6th century CE was the earliest of these Nayanmars. The celebrated Saiva hymnists Sundaramoorthy, Thirugnana Sambanthar and Thirunavukkarasar (also known as Appar) were of this period. Of Appar's verses 3066 have survived. Sambandar sang 4,169 verses. Together these form the first six books of the Saiva canon, collected by Nambi Andar Nambi in the 10th century. Sundarar wrote Tiruttondartokai which gives the list of sixty-two Nayanmars. This was later elaborated by Sekkilar in his Periyapuranam (4,272 verses) . Manikkavasagar, who lived around the 8th century CE was a minister in the Pandya court. His Tiruvasakam consisting of over 600 verses is noted for its passionate devotion. These Saivite hymns collectively called Thirumurai.

=== Narrative epics ===
Cilappatikaram is one of the outstanding works of general literature of this period. The authorship and exact date of the classic Cilappatikaram are not definitely known. Ilango Adigal, who is credited with this work was reputed to be the brother of the Sangam age Chera king Senguttuvan. However there is no surviving information of such a brother in the numerous poems sung about the Chera king. The Cilappatikaram is unique in its vivid portrayal of the ancient Tamil land. This is unknown in other works of this period. Cilappatikaram and its companion epic Manimekalai are Jain and Buddhist philosophy. Manimekalai was written by Sattanar who was a contemporary of Ilango Adigal. Manimekalai contains a long exposition of fallacies of logic. Kongu Velir, a Jain author wrote Perunkathai. Valayapathi and Kundalakesi are the names of two other narrative poems of this period written by a Jain and a Buddhist author respectively. These works have been lost and only a few poems of Valayapathi have been found so far.

== Medieval literature ==
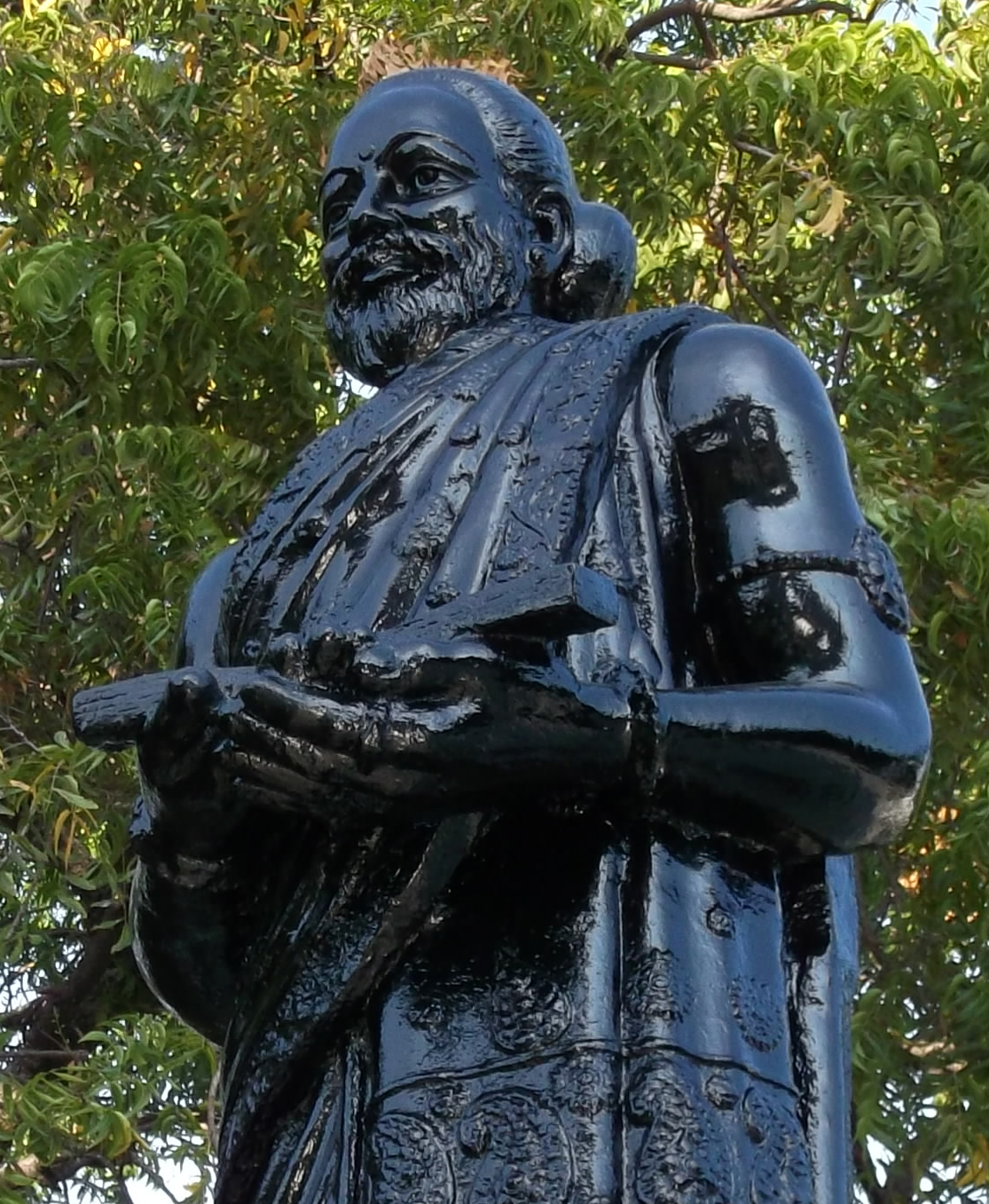
Kambar (c.1100 CE) wrote the Tamil 'Raamaayanam'.

The medieval period was the period of the Chola Empire when the entire south India was under a single administration. The period between the 11th and the 13th centuries, during which the Chola power was at its peak, there were relatively few foreign incursions and the life for the Tamil people was one of peace and prosperity. It also provided the opportunity for the people to interact with cultures beyond their own, as the Cholas ruled over most of the South India, Sri Lanka and traded with the kingdoms in southeast Asia. The Cholas built numerous temples, mainly for their favourite god Shiva, and these were celebrated in numerous hymns. The Prabhanda became the dominant form of poetry. The religious canons of Shaiva and Vaishnava sects were beginning to be systematically collected and categorised. Nambi Andar Nambi, who was a contemporary of Rajaraja Chola I, collected and arranged the books on Saivism into eleven books called Tirumurais. The hagiology of Saivism was standardised in Periyapuranam (also known as Tiruttondar Puranam) by Sekkilar, who lived during the reign of Kulothunga Chola II (1133–1150 CE). Religious books on the Vaishnava sect were mostly composed in Sanskrit during this period. The great Vaishnava leader Ramanuja lived during the reigns of Athirajendra Chola and Kulothunga Chola I, and had to face religious persecution from the Cholas who belonged to the Saiva sect. One of the best known Tamil works of this period is the Ramavatharam by Kamban who flourished during the reign of Kulottunga III. Ramavatharam is the greatest epic in Tamil Literature, and although the author states that he followed Valmiki, his work is not a mere translation or adaptation, but an original creation of epic grandeur. Kamban imports into his narration the colour and landscape of his own time. A contemporary of Kamban was the famous poet Auvaiyar who found great happiness in writing for young children. Her works, Athichoodi and Konraiventhan are even now generally read and taught in schools in Tamil Nadu. Her two other works, Mooturai and Nalvali were written for slightly older children. All the four works are didactic in character. They explain the basic wisdom that should govern mundane life.

Of the books on the Buddhist and the Jain faiths, the most noteworthy is the Jivaka-chintamani by the Jain ascetic Thirutakkadevar composed in the 10th century. Viruttam style of poetry was used for the first time for the verses in this book. The five Tamil epics Seevaka-chintamani, Silappatikaram, Manimekalai, Kundalakesi and Valayapathi are collectively known as Five Great Epics. There were a number of books written on Tamil grammar. Yapperungalam and Yapperungalakkarigai were two works on prosody by the Jain ascetic Amirtasagara. Buddamitra wrote Virasoliyam, another work on Tamil grammar, during the reign of Virarajendra Chola. Virasoliyam attempts to find synthesis between Sanskrit and Tamil grammar. Other grammatical works of this period are Nannul by Pavanandi, Vaccanandi Malai by Neminatha, and the annotations on the puram theme, Purapporul Venpamalai by Aiyanaridanar.

There were biographical and political works such as Jayamkondar's Kalingattuparani, a semi-historical account on the two invasions of Kalinga by Kulothunga Chola I. Jayamkondar was a poet-laureate in the Chola court and his work is a fine example of the balance between fact and fiction the poets had to tread. Ottakuttan, a close contemporary of Kambar, wrote three Ulas on Vikrama Chola, Kulothunga Chola II and Rajaraja Chola II.

== Vijayanagar and Nayak period ==
The period from 1300 CE to 1650 was a period of constant change in the political situation of Tamil Nadu. The Tamil country was invaded by the armies of the Delhi Sultanate and raided the Pandya kingdom. This overstretched the Delhi Sultanate to such an extent it collapsed soon after which triggered the rise of the Bahmani Sultans in the Deccan. Vijayanagar empire rose from the ashes of the kingdoms of Hoysalas and Chalukyas and eventually conquered the entire south India. The Vijayanagar kings appointed regional governors to rule various territories of their kingdom and Tamil Nadu was ruled by the Madurai Nayaks, Thanjavur Nayaks and Gingee Nayaks. This period saw a large output of philosophical works, commentaries, epics and devotional poems. A number of monasteries (Mathas) were established by the various Hindu sects and these began to play a prominent role in educating the people. Numerous authors were of either the Saiva or the Vaishnava sects. The Vijayanagar kings and their Nayak governors were ardent Hindus and they patronised these mathas. Although the kings and the governors of the Vijayanagar empire spoke Kannada and Telugu they encouraged the growth of Tamil literature as we find no slowing down in the literary output during this period.

There was a large output of works of philosophical and religious in nature, such as the Sivananabodam by Meykandar. At the end of the 14th century Svarupananda Desikar wrote two anthologies on the philosophy of Advaita, the Sivaprakasapperundirattu. Arunagirinathar who lived in Tiruvannamalai in the 14th century wrote Tiruppugal. Around 1360 verses of unique lilt and set to unique metres these poems are on the god Muruga. Madai Tiruvengadunathar, an official in the court of the Madurai Nayak, wrote Meynanavilakkam on the Advaita Vedanta. Siva prakasar, in the early 17th century wrote a number of works on the Saiva philosophy. Notable among these is the Nanneri which deals with moral instructions. A considerable par to the religious and philosophical literature of the age took the form of Puranas or narrative epics. A number of these were written on the various deities of the temples in Tamil Nadu and are known as Sthala Puranas, based on legend and folklore. One of the most important of the epics was the Mahabharatam by Villiputturar. He translated Vyasa's epic into Tamil and named it Villibharatam. Kanthapuranam on the god Murugan was written by Kacchiappa Sivachariyar who lived in the 15th century. This work was based broadly on the Sanskrit Skandapurana. Varatungarama Pandya, a Pandya king of the period was a littérateur of merit and wrote Paditrruppattanthathi. He also translated into Tamil the erotic book known as Kokkoha from Sanskrit.

This period also an age of many commentaries of ancient Tamil works. Adiyarkunallar wrote an annotation on Cilappatikaram. Senavaraiyar wrote a commentary on the Tolkappiyam. Then came the famous Parimelalagar whose commentary on the Tirukkural is still considered one of the best available. Other famous annotators such as Perasiriyar and Naccinarikiniyar wrote commentaries on the various work of Sangam literature. The first Tamil dictionary was attempted by Mandalapurusha who compiled the lexicon Nigandu Cudamani. Thayumanavar, who lived in the early 18th century, is famous for a number of short poems of philosophical nature.

The 17th-century altruist Syed Khader, known colloquially as Seethakaathi, was a great patron of all Tamil poets. He commissioned Umaruppulavar to pen the first biography of Nabi. The collection of poems was called Seerapuranam. The 17th century also saw for the first time literary works by Christian authors. Costanzo Giuseppe Beschi (1680–1746), better known as Veeramamunivar, compiled the first dictionary in Tamil. His Chathurakarathi was the first to list the Tamil words in alphabetical order. During the early 18th century, Nallapillai authored the remaining 8 parvas of Villiputturar's the Villi Bharatam, compiled and titled Nallapillai Bharatam, his grand literary undertaking was supported by a wealthy benefactor named Sengadu Veeraraghava Reddiar.

== Modern era ==
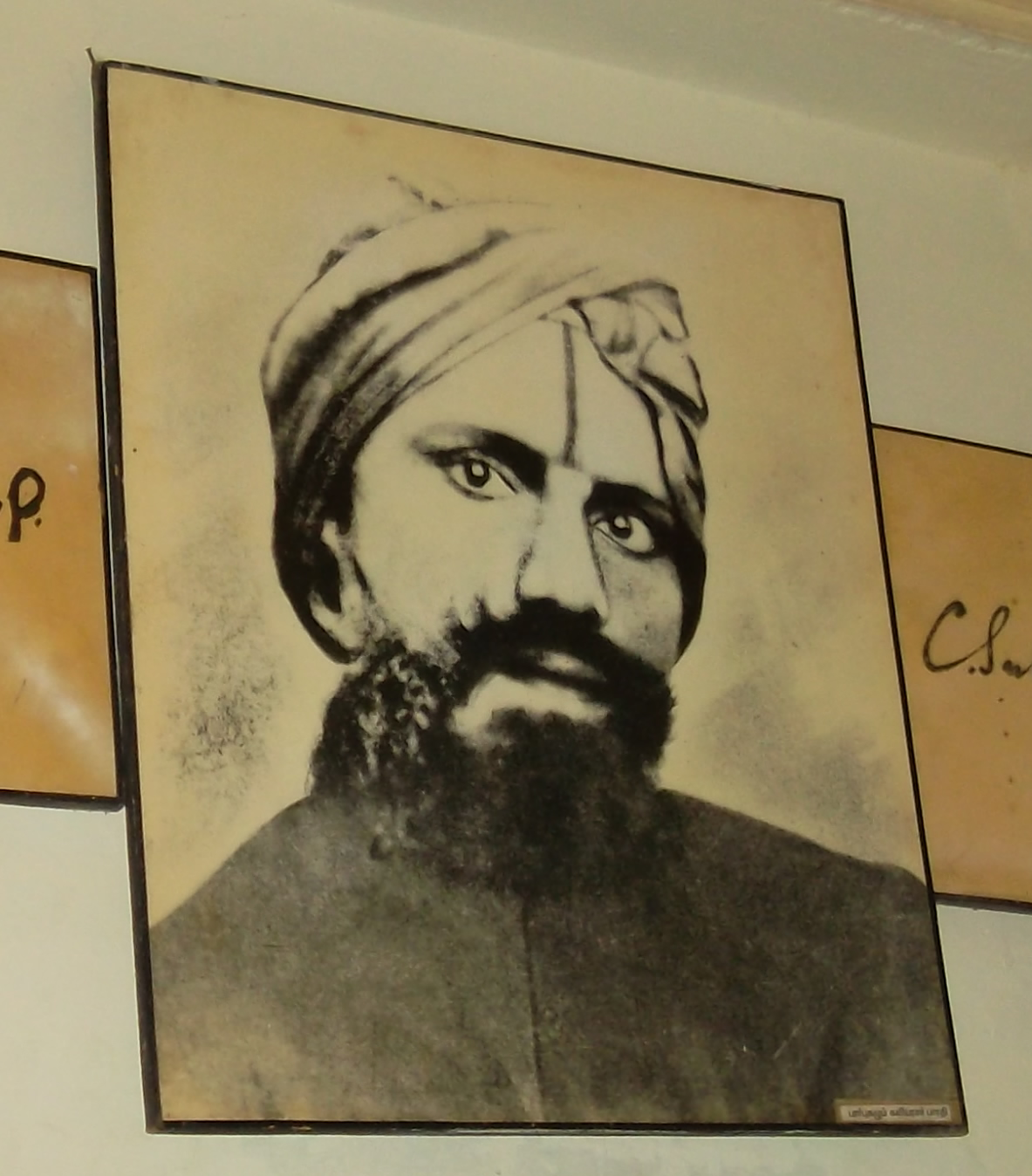
Subramanya Bharathi (1882–1921) Tamil writer, poet, Indian freedom fighter.

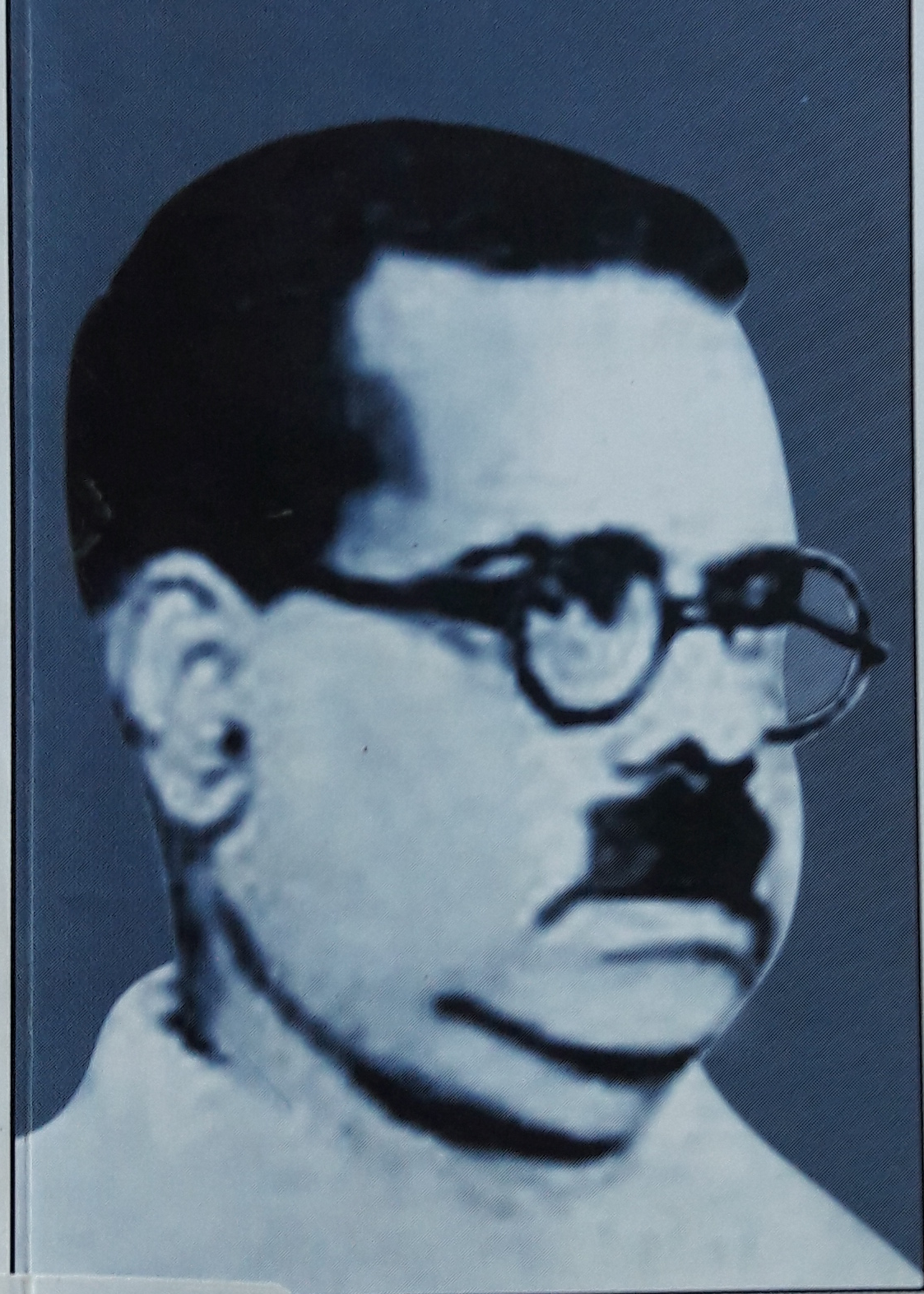
Thani Tamil Iyakkam's Bharathidasan, freedom fighter, Tamil writer, poet.

During the 18th and the 19th century, Tamil Nadu witnessed some of the most profound changes in the political scene. The traditional Tamil ruling clans were superseded by European colonists and their sympathisers. The Tamil society underwent a deep cultural shock with the imposition of Western cultural influences. The Hindu religious establishments attempted to stem the tide of change and to safeguard the Tamil cultural values. Notable among these were the Saiva monasteries at Tiruvavaduthurai, Dharmapuram, Thiruppananthal and Kundrakudi. Meenakshi Sundaram Pillai (1815–1876) was a Tamil scholar who taught Tamil at one of these monasteries. He wrote more than eighty books consisting of over 200,000 poems. He is more famous however for encouraging U. V. Swaminatha Iyer to go search for Tamil books that have been lost for centuries.

Gopalakrishna Bharathi lived during the early 19th century. He wrote numerous poems and lyrics set to tune in Carnatic music. His most famous work is the Nandan Charitam on the life of Nandanar who, having been born in a sociologically lower caste, faces and overcomes the social obstacles in achieving his dream of visiting the Chidambaram temple. This work is a revolutionary social commentary considering the period in which it was written, although Gopalakrishna Bharati expanded on the story in Periyapuranam. Ramalinga Adigal (Vallalar) (1823–1874) wrote the devotional poem Tiruvarutpa is considered to be a work of great beauty and simplicity. Maraimalai Adigal (1876–1950) advocated for the purity of Tamil and wanted to clean it of words with Sanskrit influences.

One of the great Tamil poets of this period was Subramanya Bharathi. His works are stimulating in their progressive themes like freedom and feminism. Bharathy introduced a new poetic style into the somewhat rigid style of Tamil poetry writing, which had followed the rules set down in the Tolkaappiyam. His puthukkavithai (Lit.:new poetry) broke the rules and gave poets the freedom to express themselves. He also wrote Tamil prose in the form of commentaries, editorials, short stories and novels. Some of these were published in the Tamil daily Swadesamitran and in his Tamil weekly India. Inspired by Bharathi, many poets resorted to poetry as a means of reform. Bharathidasan was one such poet. U.V.Swaminatha Iyer, was instrumental in the revival of interest in the Sangam age literature in Tamil Nadu. He travelled all over the Tamil country, collecting, deciphering and publishing ancient books such as Cilappatikaram, Kuruntokai, etc. He published over 90 books and wrote En caritham, an autobiography.

=== Tamil novel ===
The novel as a genre of literature arrived in Tamil in the third quarter of the 19th century, more than a century after it became popular with English writers. Its emergence was perhaps facilitated by the growing population of Tamils with a western education and exposure to popular English fiction. Mayavaram Vedanayagam Pillai wrote the first Tamil novel Prathapa Mudaliar Charithram in 1879. This was a romance with an assortment of fables, folk tales and even Greek and Roman stories, written with the entertainment of the reader as the principal motive. It was followed by Kamalambal Charitram by B. R. Rajam Iyer in 1893 and Padmavathi Charitram by A. Madhaviah in 1898. These two portray the life of Brahmins in 19th-century rural Tamil Nadu, capturing their customs and habits, beliefs and rituals. Although it was primarily a powerful narration of the common man's life in a realistic style spiced with natural humour, Rajam Iyer's novel has a spiritual and philosophical undertone. Madhaviah tells the story in a more realistic way with a searching criticism of the upper caste society, particularly the sexual exploitation of girls by older men. D. Jayakanthan has enriched the high traditions of literary traditions of Tamil language and contributed towards the shaping of Indian literature. His literature presents a deep and sensitive understanding of complex human nature and is an authentic and vivid index of Indian reality. One famous novel of his is Sila Nerangalil Sila Manithargal. Since the 1990s the post-modernist writers emerged as a major figures, including Jeyamohan, S.Ramakrishnan, Charu Nivedita, and Konangi, who mixes classical Tamil inflections with experimental sound poets.

There are other less appreciated works involving those translated from other languages, which are often unrecognized by Tamil pundits. The works include "Urumaatram" (translation of Franz Kafka's The Metamorphosis), Siluvayil Thongum Saathaan (translation of "Devil on the Cross" by Ngũgĩ wa Thiong'o), Thoongum azhagigalin Illam (translation of "The House of the Sleeping Beauties" by Yasunari Kawabata). Writers like Amarantha, Latha Ramakrishnan are responsible for these works.

=== Popular fiction ===
Crime and detective fiction has enjoyed wide popularity in Tamil Nadu since the 1930s. Popular authors in the years before independence included Kurumbur Kuppusami and Vaduvur Duraisami Iyengar. In the 1950s and 1960s, Tamilvanan's detective hero Shankarlal carried readers to a variety of foreign locales, while using a pure Tamil with very few Hindi or English loan words. These writers are often extremely prolific, with hundreds or even thousands of short novels to their credit, and one or more short novel published in a monthly periodical. Indra Soundar Rajan, another popular modern author, writes supernatural crime thrillers usually based around Hindu mythology.

=== Modern Tamil novelists ===
In the 1940s and 1950s Kalki Krishnamurthy was notable for his historical and social fiction.

In the 1950s and 60s, Chandilyan wrote a number of very popular historical romance novels set in medieval India or on medieval trade routes with Malaysia, Indonesia and Europe.

From the 1950s, spanning six decades, Jayakanthan authored around 40 novels, 200 short stories, apart from two autobiographies. Outside literature, he made two films. In addition, four of his other novels were adapted into films by others. His works revolve around the lives of underclass people like rickshaw-pullers, prostitutes and rag-pickers.

Arunaa Nandhini is one of recent Tamil novelists who has entered the hearts of many Tamil readers, and her story covers family subject, romance, reality, with some humor added for the readers to enjoy their leisure.

Though sales of Tamil pulp fiction have declined since the hey-day of the mid-1990s, and many writers have turned to the more lucrative television serial market, there remains a thriving scene.

The rise of the Internet has triggered a dramatic growth in the number of Tamil blogs and specialist portals catering to political and social issues. Tamil literature is even available in the form of e-books. Tamil literature boasts a rich tradition of novel writing, with many talented authors contributing to the literary landscape. Some prominent Tamil writers include:

- Kalki Krishnamurthy (1899–1954)
- S. Ramakrishnan (1937–)
- Jayakanthan (1934–2015)
- Akilan (1922–1988)
- R. K. Narayan (1906–2001)
- C. Rajagopalachari (1878–1972)
- Pudhumaipithan (1906–1948)
- Sivasankari (1942–)
- R. Chudamani (1931–2010)

These writers have played a crucial role in shaping Tamil literature through their diverse themes and narrative styles.

=== Periodicals ===
The increasing demand for literature caused a number of journals and periodicals to be published, and these in turn provided a platform for authors to publish their work. Rajavritti Bodhini and Dina Varthamani in 1855 and Salem Pagadala Narasimhalu Naidu's fortnightlies, Salem Desabhimini in 1878 and Coimbatore Kalanidhi in 1880, were the earliest Tamil journals.

In 1882, G. Subramaniya Iyer started the newspaper Swadesamitran. It became the first Tamil daily in 1889. This was the start of many journals to follow and many novelists began to serialise their stories in these journals. The humour magazine Ananda Vikatan was started by S.S. Vasan in 1929. Kalki Krishnamurthy (1899–1954) serialised his short stories and novels in Ananda Vikatan and eventually started his own weekly Kalki for which he wrote the popular novels Parthiban Kanavu, Sivagamiyin Sabadham and Ponniyin Selvan.

Pudhumaipithan (1906–1948) was a writer of short stories and provided the inspiration for a number of authors who followed him. The new poetry or pudukkavithai pioneered by Bharathi in his prose-poetry was further developed by the literary periodicals manikkodi and ezhuttu (edited by Si Su Chellappa). Poets such as Mu. Metha contributed to these periodicals.

The writings of several Tamil Muslim poets such as Kavikko Abdul Rahman, Pavalar Inqulab, Manushyaputhiran and Rajathi Salma sparked a number of social reforms.

The fortnightly journal Samarasam was established in 1981 to highlight and cater to the ethnic Tamil Muslim community's issues.

== Tamil journalism ==
The first Tamil periodical was published by the Christian Religious Tract Society in 1831 – The Tamil Magazine.

The increasing demand of the literate public caused a number of journals and periodicals to be published and these in turn provided a platform for authors to publish their work. Rajavritti Bodhini and Dina Varthamani in 1855 and Salem Pagadala Narasimhalu Naidu's fortnightlies, Salem Desabhimini in 1878 and Coimbatore Kalanidhi in 1880, were the earliest Tamil journals.

The first regular newspaper in Tamil was Swadesamitran in 1882, started by G.Subramaniya Iyer, editor and sponsor of The Hindu and founding member of the Indian National Congress. He created a whole new Tamil political vocabulary. He was conscious that those with a knowledge of English are fewer in number and those with a knowledge of Indian languages make the vast majority. He felt that unless the people were told about the objectives of British rule and its merits and defects in the Indian languages, their political knowledge would never develop. When Subramania Aiyer quit The Hindu 1898, he made the Swadesamitran his full-time business. In 1899, the first Tamil daily. It was to enjoy this status for 17 years.

Subramania Aiyer's "pugnacious style, never qualifying words to soften the sharp tenor of a sentence," his use of words "dipped in a paste of extra pungent green chillies," made the Swadesamitran sought by Tamils wherever they lived in the world. And the daily became even more popular when Subramania Bharati joined it in 1904. The next year, when Lala Lajpat Rai was arrested and agitation followed in the Punjab, Subramania Aiyer's attitude to the British changed and he became a trenchant political critic of the Raj. His whole political mantra can be summed up in these words: `Peaceful but tireless and unceasing effort.' Let us sweat ourselves into Swaraj, he would seem to say." Swadesamitran is credited for coining new Tamil words to deal with science, politics and administration. It had the most comprehensive budget of news among all the regional language papers of that time.

In 1917, Desabhaktan, another Tamil daily began with T.V. Kalyansundara Menon as editor. He was succeeded by V.V.S. Iyer, a colleague of the Savarkar brothers. These two editors were scholars with a natural, highly readable but polished style of writing.

The freedom movement and the advent of Gandhi also impacted Tamil journalism. Navasakthi, a Tamil periodical edited by Tamil scholar and freedom fighter V. Kalyanasundaram. C.Rajagopalachari began Vimochanam, a Tamil journal devoted to propagating prohibition at the Gandhi Ashram in Tiruchengode in Salem district.

In 1926, P. Varadarajulu Naidu, who was conducting a Tamil news-cum-views weekly 'Tamil Nadu' started a daily with the same name. Its forceful and colloquial style gained it a wide readership but after the paper failed to take sides with the 1930 Civil Disobedience Movement, the Congress Party decided to bring out a new Tamil daily – India, edited by renowned poet Subramania Bharati. India showed great promise but could not establish itself financially, and folded up soon after Bharati was exiled to Pondicherry. All these papers were published from Madras.

In 1933, the first Tamil tabloid – the 8 page Jayabharati began at a price of 1/4 anna. It closed in 1940 as the price could not sustain even its postage. In September 1934, S. Sadanand (who was running The Free Press Journal) started the Tamil daily Dinamani with T.S. Chockalingam as editor. It was priced at 6 pies, contained bright features and was fearlessly critical. It was highly successful and its circulation eclipsed the total circulation of all other Tamil dailies. Soon 'India' was incorporated into Dinamani. Dinamani made a studied and conscious effort to make the contents of a newspaper intelligible even to the newly literate. In 1935, Viduthalai was begun, but it was more of a views-paper than a newspaper. The Non-Brahman Movement also gave an impetus to Tamil journalism. Newspapers like the Bharat Devi were strong supporters of this movement.

Many magazines began in Tamil Nadu during the 1920s and '30s. The humour magazine Ananda Vikatan started by S.S. Vasan in 1929 was to help create some of the greatest Tamil novelists. It is still running successfully after 80 years and the Vikatan group today also publishes Chutti Vikatan, Junior Vikatan, Motor Vikatan and other special interest magazines. R. Krishnamurthy serialised his short stories and novels in Ananda Vikatan and eventually started his own weekly Kalki. The name Kalki denotes the impending tenth Avatar of Lord Vishnu in the Hindu religion, who it is said, will bring to an end the Kali Yuga and reinstate Dharma or righteousness among the worldly beings. He used the name because he wanted to bring about liberation of India.

In 1942, Dina Thanthi (Daily Telegraph) was started in Madurai with simultaneous editions in Madras, Salem and Tiruchirappalli. It was founded by S.P. Adithanar, a lawyer trained in Britain. He modeled Thanthi on the style of an English tabloid- The Daily Mirror. He aimed to bring out a newspaper that ordinary people would read, and which would encourage a reading habit even among the newly literate. In the past, the daily newspaper which was printed in Madras reached the southern Tamil region after at least one day. Thanthi used the public bus system to distribute the paper throughout the south Tamil region and capitalized on the hunger for war news that arose after Singapore fell to the Japanese. Due to financial constraints, its Salem and Tiruchirappalli editions had to be closed down for a while. Thanthi emphasized local news, especially crime and the courts. It used photographs extensively and brought banner headlines to Tamil journalism. It could fit one story on an entire broadsheet page, mainly filled with large easy-to-read headlines. One of its biggest scoops was the murder of the editor of a scandalous film magazine by two actors. Thanthi covered the trial in Madras in detail, and its reporters phoned the daily account to the printing centre in Madurai. Thanthi was the first Tamil paper to understand the people’s fascination with crime and film stars. The paper was popular and it was said that Tamils learned to read in order to read the newspaper.

Dina Thanthi became one of the largest Tamil language dailies by circulation within a few years; it has been a leading Tamil daily since the 1960s. It has today 14 editions. It is the highest circulated Tamil daily in Bangalore and Pondicherry. It issues a book called 10th, +2 Vina Vidai Book, on every Wednesday during the second part of the year. The model question papers of all the subjects of Standard 10 and 12 are provided with answers along with the question papers of board exams that are conducted previous year.

== See also ==
- Project Madurai: open access Tamil literature repository
- List of Tamil poets
- Sri Lankan Tamil Literature
- Tamil Heritage Foundation, digitalization of ancient Tamil literature
- Tamil historical novels
- Tamil mythology
- Legal status of Tamil
- § Dalit literature in Tamil
