= Kalittokai =

Work of classical Tamil literature

Kalittokai (Tamil: கலித்தொகை meaning the kali-metre anthology) is a classical Tamil poetic work and the sixth of Eight Anthologies (Ettuthokai) in the Sangam literature. It is an "akam genre – love and erotic – collection par excellence", according to Kamil Zvelebil – a Tamil literature and history scholar. The anthology contains 150 poems and was compiled by one of the authors named Nallantuvanar. The collection has a different tone, metre and style than earlier Sangam literature, evidence that it is a late Sangam work, likely from the 3rd century CE or after. Naccinarkiniyar, a Tamil scholar who lived during the 14th century CE, has commented on this work.

It is unclear whether the Kalittokai was authored by more than one author. Some scholars attribute the collection to five authors, including one by the famed Sangam poet Kapilar. Others, such as S.V. Damodaram Pillai and K.N. Sivaraja Pillai consider it the work of one poet.

The Kalittokai anthology uses the kali metre of varied length. This metre is more advanced and complex than the akaval metre found in earlier Sangam poetry. The kali metre combines aciriyam and venpa, creating opportunities to set dialogues within the metre. The poets who composed the Kalittokai created what comes across as a "one-act plays", sometimes with "coarse, spicy, racy, rude, bawdy, or humorous" dialogues, states Zvelebil. According to Herman Tieken, these compositions are examples of lasya minor dance scenes as described in the chapters 19 and 31 of the Natyasastra. The kali metre has several structural subtypes, each suited for different literary purposes.

The poems include cultured love situations, as well as erotics, folkmotifs and vulgar situations. Its poems are categorised into the five tinais according to the mood and subject matter conforming to the Sangam landscape. The first part (2–36) deals with palai setting, the second (37–65) with kurinji, the third (66–100) with marutam, the fourth (101–117) with mullai and the fifth (118–150) with neital. These five section were each written by a separate author. Perunkadunkon wrote the palai songs, the poet Kapilar is attributed to the kurinji, Ilanaagan the marutam songs, Nalluruthiran the mullai songs and the poet Nallanthuvan the neithal songs.

The Kalittokai poems are notable for the relatively higher number of Sanskrit loan words, lexical and structural innovations, the practice of quoting lines of earlier poems such as Kuṟuntokai 18.5, and the lack the names of chieftains, kings or poets. The anthology is also notable for including allusions and references to pan-Indian love and moral legends found in Epics– and Puranas–genre Sanskrit texts. According to Zvelebil, some examples in the Kalittokai include Krishna, an avatara of Vishnu killing his uncle Kamsa in poems 134 and killing a group of people called the Mallars, Shiva invoked in poem 1 and 2 who is praised by the Brahmins and the Vedas, Duryodhana's evil plans to kill the Pandava brothers and how they escape from the Lakshagriha in poem 25, the battle of Murugan and Surapadma in poem 27, An event mentioned in the epic Ramayana, of Ravana lifting the Kailasha is described in the Poem 139 of Lines 33 to 37, Bhima killing Duryodhana in poem 52, the love stories of Urvashi and Tilottama in poem 109, among others.

The poems of Kalittokai show evidence of the ancient music of the Tamil people with its rhythmic phrases.

== Examples ==
O dwarf, standing piece of timber,
you've yet to learn the right approach
to girls. Humans do not copulate
at noon: but you come now to hold
our hand and ask us to your place.
– Kalittokai 94 (partial), Translator: A.K. Ramanujan

ஆற்றுதல்' என்பது, ஒன்று அலந்தவர்க்கு உதவுதல்;
போற்றுதல்' என்பது, புணர்ந்தாரை பிரியாமை;
பண்பு' எனப்படுவது, பாடு அறிந்து ஒழுகுதல்;
அன்பு' எனப்படுவது, தன் கிளை செறாஅமை;
அறிவு' எனப்படுவது, பேதையார் சொல் நோன்றல்;
செறிவு' எனப்படுவது, கூறியது மறாஅமை;
நிறை' எனப்படுவது, மறை பிறர் அறியாமை;
முறை' எனப்படுவது, கண்ணோடாது உயிர் வௌவல்;
பொறை' எனப்படுவது, போற்றாரை பொறுத்தல்.

— Kalithogai 133
Translation:

Goodness is helping one in distress;
Support is not deserting one who is dependent;
Culture is to act in unison with the ways of the world;
Love is not surrendering ties with one’s kin;
Wisdom is to ignore the advice of the ignorant;
Honesty is not to go back on one’s words;
Integrity is to ignore others’ faults;
Justice is awarding punishment without partiality;
Patience is to suffer the ill-disposed.

— Translated by C.K. Swaminathan
