= Tolkāppiyam =

Ancient work on Tamil grammar

Tolkāppiyam, also romanised as Tholkaappiyam (Tamil: தொல்காப்பியம் , lit. "ancient poem"), is the oldest extant Tamil grammar text and the oldest extant long work of Tamil literature. The surviving manuscripts of the Tolkappiyam consists of three books (Tamil: அதிகாரம், romanized: Atikāram, lit. 'Chapter or Authority'), each with nine chapters (Tamil: இயல், romanized: Iyal), with a cumulative total of 1,610 (483+463+664) sutras in the Tamil: நூற்பா, romanized: nūṛpā, lit. 'verse' meter. (Note: The palm-leaf manuscripts and commentaries on the text vary slightly in the total number of verse-sutras; they are all about 1,610.) It is a comprehensive text on grammar, and includes sutras on orthography, phonology, etymology, morphology, semantics, prosody, sentence structure and the significance of context in language. Mayyon as (Vishnu), Seyyon as (Murugan), Vendhan as (Indra), Varuna as (Varuna) and Kotṟavai as (Devi or Bagavathi) are the gods mentioned.

The Tolkappiyam is difficult to date. Some in the Tamil tradition place the text in the historical Pandya kingdom Second tamil sangam, variously in 1st millennium BCE or earlier. Scholars place the text much later and believe the text evolved and expanded over a period of time. According to Nadarajah Devapoopathy the earliest layer of the Tolkappiyam was likely composed between the 2nd and 1st century BCE, and the extant manuscript versions fixed by about the 5th century CE. The Tolkappiyam Ur-text likely relied on some unknown even older literature.

Iravatham Mahadevan dates the Tolkappiyam to no earlier than the 2nd century CE, as it mentions the Tamil: புள்ளி, romanized: Puḷḷi, lit. 'Point resp. Virama' being an integral part of Tamil script. The puḷḷi (a diacritical mark to distinguish pure consonants from consonants with inherent vowels) only became prevalent in Tamil epigraphs after the 2nd century CE. According to linguist S. Agesthialingam, Tolkappiyam contains many later interpolations, and the language shows many deviations consistent with late old Tamil (similar to Cilappatikaram), rather than the early Tamil poems of Eṭṭuttokai and Pattuppāṭṭu.

The Tolkappiyam contains aphoristic verses arranged into three books – the எழுத்ததிகாரம், Eḻuttatikāram, 'Letter resp. Phoneme Chapter', the சொல்லதிகாரம், Collatikāram, 'Sound resp. Word Chapter' and the பொருளதிகாரம், Poruḷatikāram, 'Subject Matter (i.e. prosody, rhetoric, poetics) Chapter'. The Tolkappiyam includes examples to explain its rules, and these examples provide indirect information about the ancient Tamil culture, sociology, and linguistic geography. It is first mentioned by name in Iraiyanar's Akapporul – a 7th- or 8th-century text – as an authoritative reference, and the Tolkappiyam remains the authoritative text on Tamil grammar. (Note: According to Thomas Lehmann, the Tolkappiyam rules are followed and exemplified in Old Tamil (pre-700 CE) literature. The Middle Tamil (700-1600 CE) and Modern Tamil (post-1600 CE) have additional distinct grammatical characteristics. Causative stems of verb bases are "lexical in Old Tamil, morphological in Middle Tamil, and syntactic in Modern Tamil", for example, states Lehmann. Nevertheless, many features of Middle and Modern Tamil are anchored in the Old Tamil of Tolkappiyam.)

== Etymology ==
The word Tolkāppiyam is an attribute-based composite word, with tol meaning "ancient, old", and kappiyam meaning "book, text, poem, kavya"; together, the title has been translated as "ancient book", "ancient poem", or "old poem". The word 'kappiyam' is from the Sanskrit Kavya.

According to Kamil Zvelebil – a Tamil literature and history scholar, Tamil purists tend to reject this Sanskrit-style etymology and offer "curious" alternatives. One of these breaks it into three "tol-kappu-iyanratu", meaning "ancient protection [of language]". An alternate etymology that has been proposed by a few purists is that the name of the work derives from the author's name Tolkāppiyan, but this is a disputed assumption because neither the author(s) nor centuries in which this piece of work was composed are known.

== Date ==
The dating of the Tolkappiyam is difficult, much debated, and it remains contested and uncertain. Proposals range between 5,320 BCE and the 8th century CE.

The tradition and some Indian scholars favor an early date for its composition, before the common era, and state that it is the work of one person associated with sage Agastya. Other Indian scholars, and non-Indian scholars such as Kamil Zvelebil, prefer to date it not as a single entity but in parts or layers. The Tolkappiyam manuscript versions that have survived into the modern age were fixed by about the 5th century CE, according to Zvelebil. Scholars reject traditional datings based on three sangams and the myth of great floods because there is no verifiable evidence in its favor, and the available evidence based on linguistics, epigraphy, Sangam literature and other Indian texts suggest a much later date. The disagreements now center around divergent dates between the 3rd century BCE and 8th century CE.

The datings proposed by contemporary scholars is based on a combination of evidence such as:

- comparison of grammar taught in Tolkappiyam versus the grammar found in the oldest known Tamil-Brahmi and old-Tamil inscriptions
- comparison of grammar taught in Tolkappiyam versus the grammar found in the oldest known Tamil texts (Sangam era); this evidence covers items such as phonemic shapes, palatals, and the evolution in the use of compounds
- comparison of grammar taught in Tolkappiyam versus the grammar taught and found in the oldest known Sanskrit texts; this includes tracing verses and phrases found in the Tolkappiyam that borrow, translate or closely paraphrase verses and phrases found in the works of ancient and influential Sanskrit scholars such as Panini, Patanjali, Manu, Kautilya, Bharata and Vatsyayana.
- comparison of poetry and prose rules taught in Tolkappiyam versus the actual early Tamil poetry and prose
- Prakrit and Sanskrit loan words (vadacol), and inconsistencies between the sutras of the Tolkappiyam

=== Dates proposed ===
- In his book published in 1925, T. R. Sesha Iyengar – a scholar of Dravidian literature and history, states that the Tolkappiyam while explaining grammar, uses terms for various forms of marriage in the Kalaviyal chapter. Elsewhere it mentions terms related to caste. Such ideas about different weddings and caste, states Iyengar, must be the influence of Sanskrit and Indo-Aryan ideologies. He disagrees with those European scholars who refuse to "concede high antiquity to the Dravidian civilization", and as a compromise suggests the Tolkappiyam was composed "before the Christian era".
- In post-Independence India, the Tamil scholar Gift Siromoney states that the Tolkappiyam should be dated based on the chronology of TALBI-P system based inscriptions, which is difficult to date. He suggests that this could be around the time of Ashoka, or centuries later.
- Iravatham Mahadevan dates the Tolkappiyam to no earlier than the 2nd century CE, as it mentions the puḷḷi being an integral part of Tamil script. The puḷḷi a diacritical mark to distinguish pure consonants from consonants with inherent vowels only became prevalent in Tamil epigraphs after the 2nd century CE.
- V. S. Rajam, a linguist specialised in Old Tamil, in her book A Reference Grammar of Classical Tamil Poetry dates it to pre-fifth century CE.
- Vaiyapuri Pillai, the author of the Tamil lexicon, dated Tolkappiyam to not earlier than the 5th or 6th century CE.
- Kamil V. Zvelebil dates the earliest layer, the core Ur-text of the Tolkappiyam to 150 BCE or later. In his 1974 review, Zvelebil places Book 1 and 2 of the Tolkappiyam in the 100 BCE to 250 CE period. Rest of the sections and sutras of the text to centuries between 3rd and 5th century CE. The extant manuscripts of Tolkappiyam are based on the "final redaction" of the 5th century, states Zvelebil.
- Takanobu Takahashi, a Japanese Indologist, states that the Tolkappiyam has several layers with the oldest dating to 1st or 2nd century CE, and the newest and the final redaction dating to the 5th or 6th century CE.
- A C Burnell, a 19th-century Indologist who contributed to the study of Dravidian languages was of the view that the Tolkappiyam could not be dated to "much later than the eighth century."
- Herman Tieken, a Dutch scholar, states that the Tolkappiyam dates from the 9th century CE at the earliest. He arrives at this conclusion by treating the Tolkappiyam and the anthologies of Sangam literature as part of a 9th-century Pandyan project to raise the prestige of Tamil as a classical language equal to Sanskrit, and assigning new dates to the traditionally accepted dates for a vast section of divergent literature (Sangam literature, post-Sangam literature and Bhakti literature like Tevaram). Hermen Tieken's work has, however, been criticised on fundamental, methodological, and other grounds by G.E. Ferro-Luzzi, George Hart and Anne Monius.

== Author ==
There is no firm evidence to assign the authorship of this treatise to any one author. Tholkapiyam, some traditionally believe, was written by a single author named Tolkappiyar, a disciple of Vedic sage Agastya mentioned in the Rigveda (1500–1200 BCE). According to the traditional legend, the original grammar was called Agathiam written down by sage Agastya, but it went missing after a great deluge. His student Tolkappiyar was asked to compile Tamil grammar, which is Tolkappiyam. In Tamil historical sources such as the 14th-century influential commentary on Tolkappiyam by Naccinarkkiniyar, the author is stated to be Tiranatumakkini (alternate name for Tolkappiyan), the son of a Brahmin rishi named Camatakkini. The earliest mention of Agastya-related Akattiyam legends are found in texts approximately dated to the 8th or 9th century. According to Hartmut Scharfe, the author of this text was likely a Jain.

According to Kamil Zvelebil, the earliest sutras of the Tolkappiyam were composed by author(s) who lived before the "majority of extant" Sangam literature, who clearly knew Pāṇini and followed Patanjali works on Sanskrit grammar because some verses of Tolkappiyam – such as T-Col 419 andT-Elutt 83 – seem to be borrowed and exact translation of verses of Patanjali's Mahābhāṣya and ideas credited to more ancient Panini. Further, the author(s) lived after Patanjali, because various sections of Tolkappiyam show the same ideas for grammatically structuring a language and it uses borrowed Indo-European words found in Panini and Patanjali works to explain its ideas. According to Hartmut Scharfe and other scholars, the phonetic and phonemic sections of the Tolkappiyam shows considerable influence of Vedic Pratishakhyas, while its rules for nominal compounds follow those in Patanjali's Mahābhāṣya, though there is also evidence of innovations. The author(s) had access and expertise of the ancient Sanskrit works on grammar and language.

According to Zvelebil, another Tamil tradition believes that the earliest layer by its author(s) – Tolkappiyan – may have been a Jaina scholar, who knew aintiram (pre-Paninian grammatical system) and lived in south Kerala, but "we do not know of any definite data concerning the original author or authors". This traditional belief, according to Vaiyapuri Pillai, is supported by a few Jaina Prakrit words such as patimaiyon found in the Tolkappiyam.

== Content ==
The Tolkappiyam deals with இலக்கணம், Ilakkaṇam, 'grammar' in three books (Atikāram), each with nine chapters (Iyal) of different sizes. The text has a cumulative total of 1,610 (Eḻuttatikāram 483 + Collatikāram 463 + Poruḷatikāram 664) sutras in the Nūṛpā meter, though some versions of its surviving manuscripts have a few less. The sutra format provides a distilled summary of the rules, one that is not easy to read or understand; commentaries are necessary for the proper interpretation and understanding of Tolkappiyam.

Book 1
எழுத்ததிகாரம், Eḻuttatikāram

எழுத்து, Eḻuttu means "sound, letter, phoneme", and this book of the Tolkappiyam covers the sounds of the Tamil language, how they are produced (phonology). It includes புணர்ச்சி, Puṇarcci, 'joining, copulation' which is combination of sounds, orthography, graphemic and phonetics with sounds as they are produced and listened to. The phonemic inventory it includes consists of 5 long vowels, 5 short vowels, and 17 consonants. The articulatory descriptions in Tolkappiyam are incomplete, indicative of a proto-language. It does not, for example, distinguish between retroflex and non-retroflex consonants, states Thomas Lehmann. The phonetic and phonemic sections of the first book show the influence of Vedic Pratisakhyas, states Hartmut Scharfe, but with some differences. For example, unlike the Pratisakhyas and the later Tamil, the first book of Tolkappiyam does not treat /ṭ/ and /ṇ/ as retroflex.

Book 2
சொல்லதிகாரம், Collatikāram

சொல், Col meaning "word", and the second book deals with "etymology, morphology, semantics and syntax", states Zvelebil. The sutras cover compounds, some semantic and lexical issues. It also mentions the twelve dialectical regions of Tamil speaking people, which suggests the author(s) had a keen sense of observation and inclusiveness for Old Tamil's linguistic geography. According to Peter Scharf, the sutras here are inspired by the work on Sanskrit grammar by Panini, but it uses Tamil terminology and adds technical innovations. Verb forms and the classification of nominal compounds in the second book show the influence of Patanjali's Mahabhasya.

Book 3
பொருளதிகாரம், Poruḷatikāram

பொருள், Poruḷ "Porul" meaning "subject matter", and this book deals with the யாப்பு, Yāppu, 'Prosody' and அணி, Aṇi, 'Rhetoric' of Old Tamil. It is here, that the book covers the two genres found in classical Tamil literature: அகம், Akam, 'love, erotics, interior world' and புறம், Puṟam, 'war, society, exterior world'. The akam is subdivided into களவு, Kaḻavu, 'Premarital Love' and கற்பு, Kaṟpu, 'Marital Love or Chastity'. It also deals with dramaturgy, simile, prosody and tradition. According to Zvelebil, this arrangement suggests that the entire Tolkappiyam was likely a guide for bardic poets, where the first two books led to this third on how to compose their songs. The third book's linking of literature (ilakkiyam) to the grammatical rules of the first and the second book (ilakkanam) created a symbiotic relationship between the two. The literary theory of Tolkappiyam, according to Peter Scharf, borrows from Sanskrit literary theory texts.

Epigraphical studies, such as those by Mahadevan, show that ancient Tamil-Brahmi inscriptions found in South India and dated to between 3rd century BCE and 4th century CE had three different grammatical form. Only one of them is assumed in the Tolkappiyam. The language of the Sangam literature is same as the one described in Tolkappiyam, except in some minor respects.

=== Commentaries ===
The Tolkappiyam is a collection of aphoristic verses in the நூற்பா, nūṛpā meter. It is ambiguous without a commentary. Tamil scholars have written commentaries on it, over the centuries:

Commentaries on Tolkappiyam
Author	Date	Notes
Ilampuranar	10th to 12th century	Full: all verses
Cenavaraiyar	13th or 14th century	Partial: 2nd book
Peraciriyar	13th century	Partial: 1st and 2nd book
Naccinarkkiniyar	14th century	Partial: 1st, 2nd and part 3rd book
Tayvaccilaiyar	16th century	Partial: 2nd book
Kallatanar	15th to 17th century	Partial: 2nd book

The commentary by Ilampuranar dated to the 11th or 12th century CE is the most comprehensive and probably the best, states Zvelebil. The commentary by Senavaraiyar deals only with the second book Sollathikaram. The commentary by Perasiriyar, which is heavily indebted to the Nannūl, frequently quotes from the Dandiyalankaram and Yapparunkalam, the former being a standard medieval rhetorica and the latter being a detailed treatise on Tamil prosody. Naccinarkiniyar's commentary, being a scholar of both Tamil and Sanskrit, quotes from Parimelalakar's works.

== Reception ==
Alexander Dubyanskiy, veteran Tamil scholar from Moscow State University stated, "I am sure that Tolkappiyam is a work which demanded not only vast knowledge and a lot of thinking but a considerable creative skill from its composer." Dubyanskiy also said that the authority of the text was undeniable: "It is a literary and cultural monument of great importance."

== See also ==
- Tamil grammar
- P. S. Subrahmanya Sastri – who was the first to translate Tolkāppiyam into English.
