= Vaishnavism in Ancient Tamilakam =

Major Hindu tradition that reveres Vishnu as the Supreme Being

Vaishnavism (Tamil: வைணவம், வைணவ சமயம்) in Tamil Nadu is documented in ancient Tamil Sangam literature dating back to the 5th century BCE. Perumal, traditionally considered a form of Vishnu, is the most frequently mentioned deity in Sangam Literature. Some of the earliest known mentions of Perumal and the Tamil devotional poems ascribed to him are found in the Paripāṭal – a Sangam era poetic anthology.

The Padmanabhaswamy Temple, located in Thiruvananthapuram, is considered to be one of the wealthiest temples in the world. It is dedicated to a form of Lord Vishnu known as Padmanabhaswamy Perumal. Several existing Hindu texts including the Vishnu Purana, Brahma Purana, Matsya Purana, Varaha Purana, Skanda Purana, Padma Purana, Vayu Purana and Bhagavata Purana have mentioned the Padmanabhaswamy Temple. In addition, the temple has several references in Sangam period literature. Several historians and scholars believe that the name "Golden Temple" attributed to the temple might reflect its immense wealth during the early Sangam period, or the golden thazhikakudams (domes on top of the gopuram). Many pieces of Sangam literature refer to the temple-city of Thiruvananthapuram as having walls of pure gold. Both the temple and the entire city are often eulogised as being made of gold, and the temple as heaven. The temple is one of the 108 principal Divya Desams ("Holy Abodes") in Vaishnavism according to existing Tamil hymns from the fifth and eighth centuries C.E and is glorified in the Divya Prabandha.

The Srirangam Ranganathaswamy Temple is also dedicated to a form of Maha Vishnu. It is considered to be the largest religious complex in the world. This temple is considered to be foremost in the 108 principal Divya Desams of Vaishnavism according to existing Tamil hymns from the fifth and eighth centuries C.E and is glorified in the Divya Prabandha and sung by all the 12 Alvars. The temple is mentioned in Tamil literature of the Sangam era (6th century BCE to the 2nd century CE), including in the epic Silapadikaram (Book 11, lines 35–40):

ஆயிரம் விரித்தெழு தலையுடை அருந்திறற் பாயற் பள்ளிப் பலர்தொழு தேத்த விரிதிரைக் காவிரி வியன்பெருந் துருத்தித் திருவமர் மார்பன் கிடந்த வண்ணமும்

āyiram viritteḻu talaiyuṭai aruntiṟaṟ pāyaṟ paḷḷip palartoḻu tētta viritiraik kāviri viyaṉperu turuttit tiruvamar mārpaṉ kiṭanta vaṇṇamum

On a magnificent cot having a thousand heads spread out, worshipped and praised by many, in an islet surrounded by Kaveri with billowing waves, is the lying posture of the one who has Lakshmi sitting on his chest

— Silapadikaram (book 11, lines 35–40)

The temple was initially constructed by the Chola ruler, Dharmavarma. The Kaveri river flood destroyed the temple's vimanam, and later, the early Chola ruler Killivalavan rebuilt the temple complex in the form that is present today. Beyond ancient textual history, archaeological evidence such as stone inscriptions from the late 1st millennium CE also refer to this temple. The inscriptions in the temple belong to the Chola, Pandya, Hoysala and Vijayanagara dynasties who ruled over the region. These inscriptions range between the 9th and 16th centuries.

During the period of invasion and plunder by the Alauddin Khilji's general Malik Kafur and his Delhi Sultanate forces in 1311, the Arabic texts of the period state that he raided a "golden temple" on river "Kanobari" (Kaveri), destroyed the temple and took the plunder including the golden icon of the deity to Delhi. According to Steven P. Hopkins and this temple is believed to be the Ranganathaswamy Temple.

Sri Venkateswara Swamy Temple in Tirupati, Andhra Pradesh is the most visited temple dedicated to Perumal in India.

Other significant institutions include Kanchipuram's Varadaraja Perumal temple, and Sri Vidhya Rajagopalaswamy Perumal Temple. The temple is called Dakshina Dvaraka (Southern Dvaraka) along with Guruvayoor by Hindus. The deity Perumal is identified with Mayon, literally meaning, "the dark-complexioned one", who is first referenced in the texts Purananuru and Pattupattu. Regarded to be the Tamil equivalent of Krishna, poetry from this period compares his dark skin to the ocean. Originally a folk deity, he was syncretised with Krishna and Vishnu, gaining popularity in the Sri Vaishnava tradition. His consort (title for the wife or husband of a monarch) is Lakshmi, the goddess of fortune, beauty, and prosperity, appearing in even the earliest strata of Tamil poetry.

Mayon is indicated to be the deity associated with the mullai tiṇai (pastoral landscape) in the Tolkappiyam. He is regarded to be the only deity who enjoyed the status of Paramporul (achieving oneness with Paramatma) during the Sangam age. He is also known as Māyavan, Māmiyon, Netiyōn, and Māl in Sangam literature.

== Mentions of Vaishnavism in Sangam Literature ==
=== Mahalakshmi in Sangama Literature ===
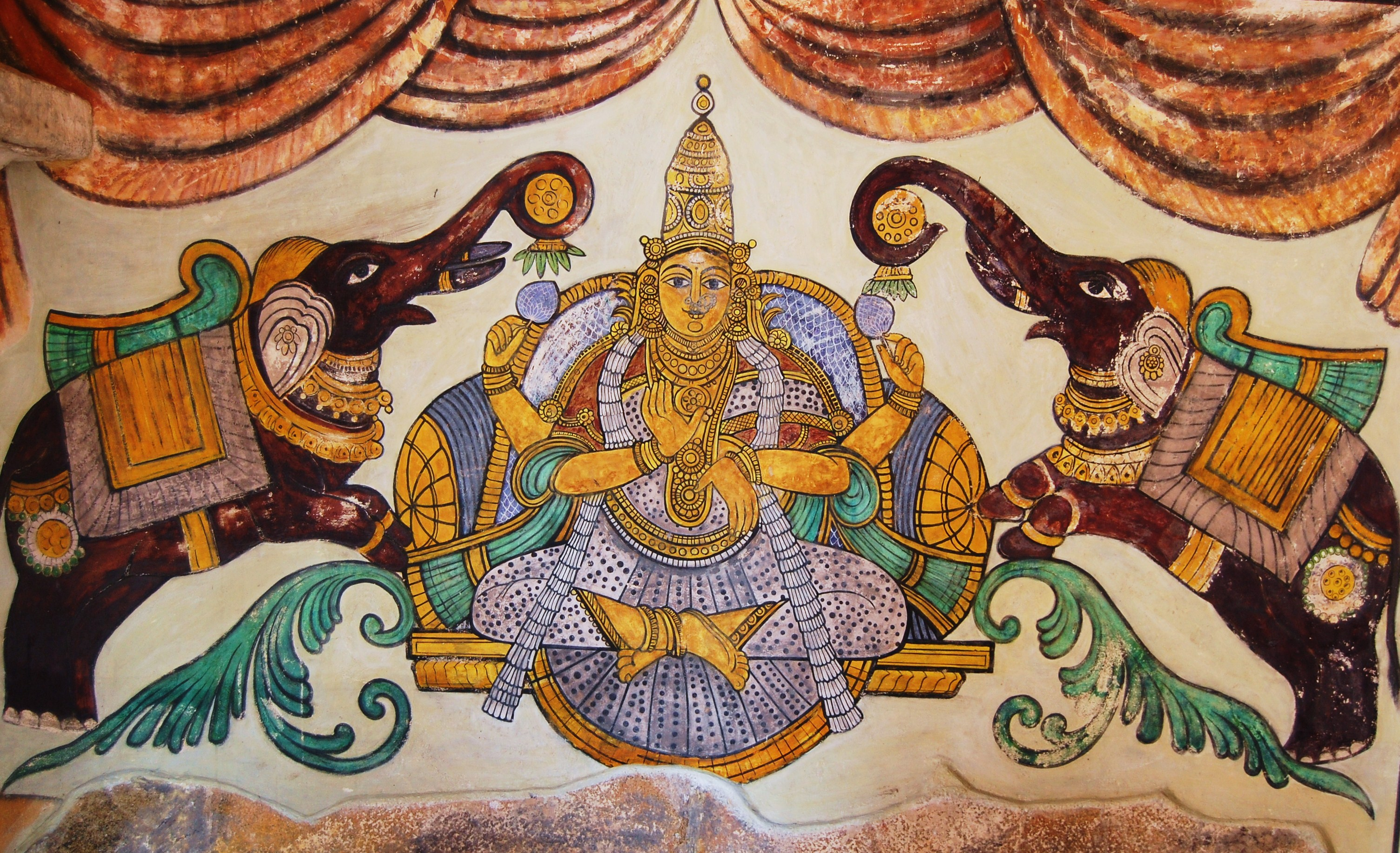
Portrait of Mahalakshmi in Brihadisvara Temple.

Lakshmi is one of the principal goddesses in Hinduism. She is the goddess of wealth, fortune, power, beauty, fertility and prosperity, and associated with Maya ("Illusion"). Lakshmi is venerated as the prosperity aspect of the Mother goddess. Lakshmi is both the consort and the divine energy (shakti) of the Hindu god Vishnu, the Supreme Being of Vaishnavism; she is also the Supreme Goddess in the sect and assists Vishnu to create, protect, and transform the universe. She is an especially prominent figure in Sri Vaishnavism, in which devotion to Lakshmi is deemed to be crucial to reach Vishnu.

In Tamil, Mahalakshmi is reverently referred to as Thayar, a term that literally means 'Mother of the world'. Lakshmi is mentioned in several places of the Sangam Literature, Mahalakshmi is often portrayed as the wife of Mahavishnu and stays at the chest of Vishnu.

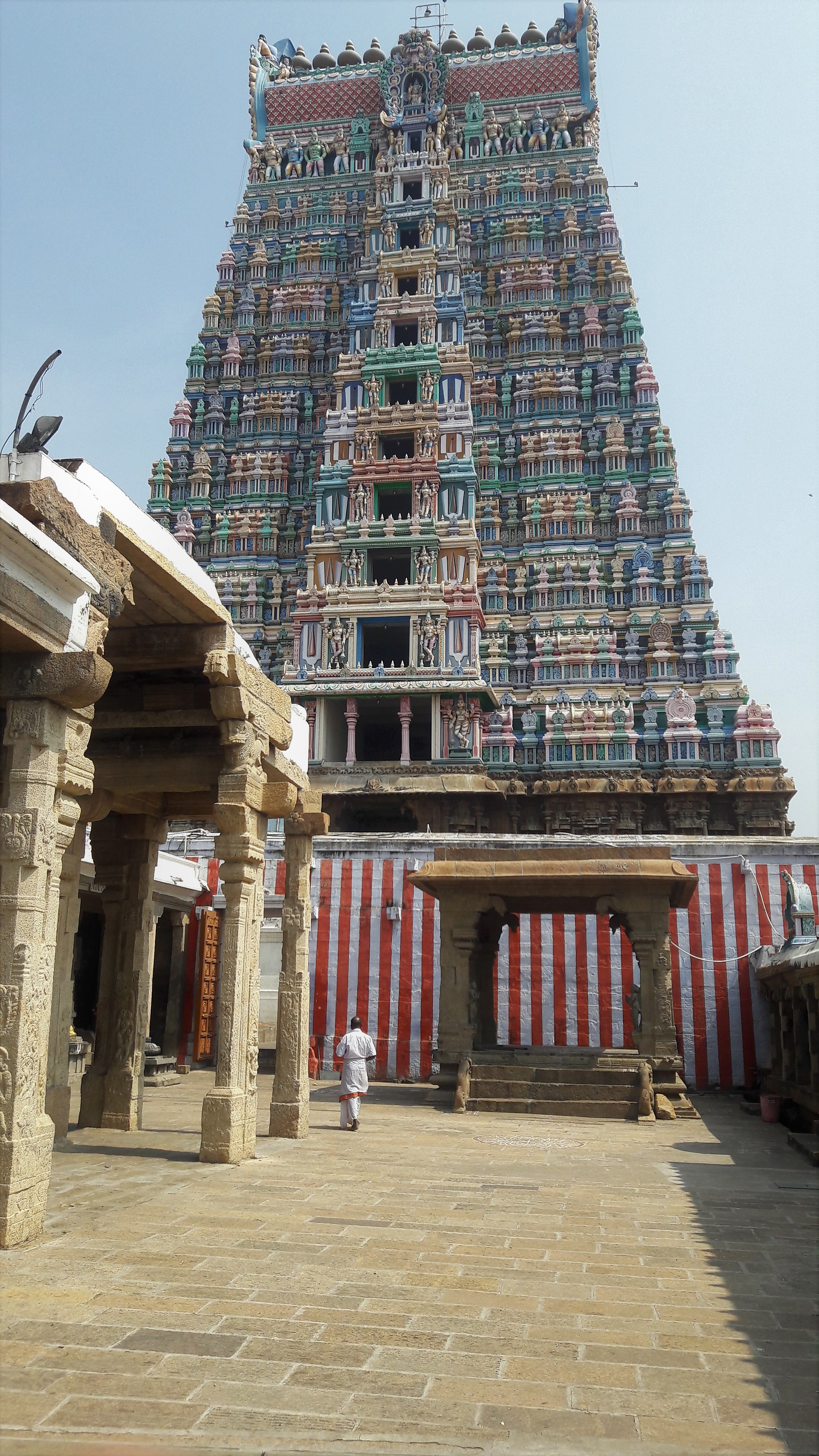
Srivilliputhur Andal temple is dedicated to Lakshmi and Vishnu where Lakshmi as Andal is more prominent than Vishnu.

She was worshipped by women in ancient Tamilakam for the return of the warriors (their husbands) with their soul in their body. Maha Lakshmi has mentions in Sangam texts. Mahalakshmi was also considered as kotravai in her other form to marry Vishnu in the avatar of Shiva.

Purananuru mentions Sita, who is an avathara of (Mahalakshmi), was abducted by the demon king Ravana. Malaipaṭukaṭām mentions the goddess of wealth and fortune, Lakshmi in lines 463–464 and the "Goddess who sits enthroned on the chest of Vishnu". Mullaippāṭṭu which mentions women praying to Maha Lakshmi for their husbands to live long and not to die in the war, Paripāṭal mentions Maha Lakshmi seated on the chest of Vishnu, Silapathikaram mentions Lakshmi several places. For example, she is mentioned as Thiru seated on the chest of Ranganatha sleeping in Srirangam, She is in the form of Sita with Rama and Radha - the lover of Krishna. She is considered as the goddess of fortune, wealth and happiness. Maturaikkāñci mentions that the city gates and house walls had symbols and portraits of Mahalakshmi. Manimekalai describes an event dedicated to Indra where the tired and sleeping young boys and girls who earlier in the day had run around in their costumes of Hindu gods (Vishnu) and goddesses (Lakshmi). It also mentions a character called Aputra who reaches Madurai. He sits with his begging bowl inside Madurai's Temple dedicated to Maha Lakshmi, the goddess of fortune. The worshippers of Lakshmi are kind and donate a large amount of food to the bowl of Aputra, which Aputra shares with the poor, the blind, the deaf, and other needy people. The text also mentions Kanyakumari as being a Hindu bathing pilgrimage site dedicated to Maha Lakshmi, The Akanāṉūṟu describes Rama at Dhanushkodi, sitting under a Banyan tree, involved in secret discussions about the war between him and Ravana who kidnapped Sita, while the birds are singing. Thirukural mentions Goddess Lakshmi in couplets 167, 408, 519, 565, 568, 616, and 617 hints, which shows the existence of Sri Vaishnavism and Valluvar's beliefs on it. There are many other mentions of Maha Lakshmi in Sangam literature.

=== Maha Vishnu in Sangam Literature ===
A reference to "Mukkol Pakavars" in Sangam literature indicates that only Vaishnava saints were holding Tridanda and were prominent during the period. Tirumal was glorified as "the supreme deity", whose divine lotus feet could burn all evil and grant moksha. During the post-Sangam period, his worship was further glorified by the poet-saints called the Alvars. Perumal (Vishnu) was the only deity who enjoyed the status of Paramporul during the Sangam age. The reference to Mukkol Bhagavars in Sangam literature indicates that only Vaishnavaite saints holding Tridanda existed during the age and Perumal was glorified as the supreme deity, whose "divine lotus feet can burn all our evils and grant moksha" (maru piraparukkum maasil sevadi).

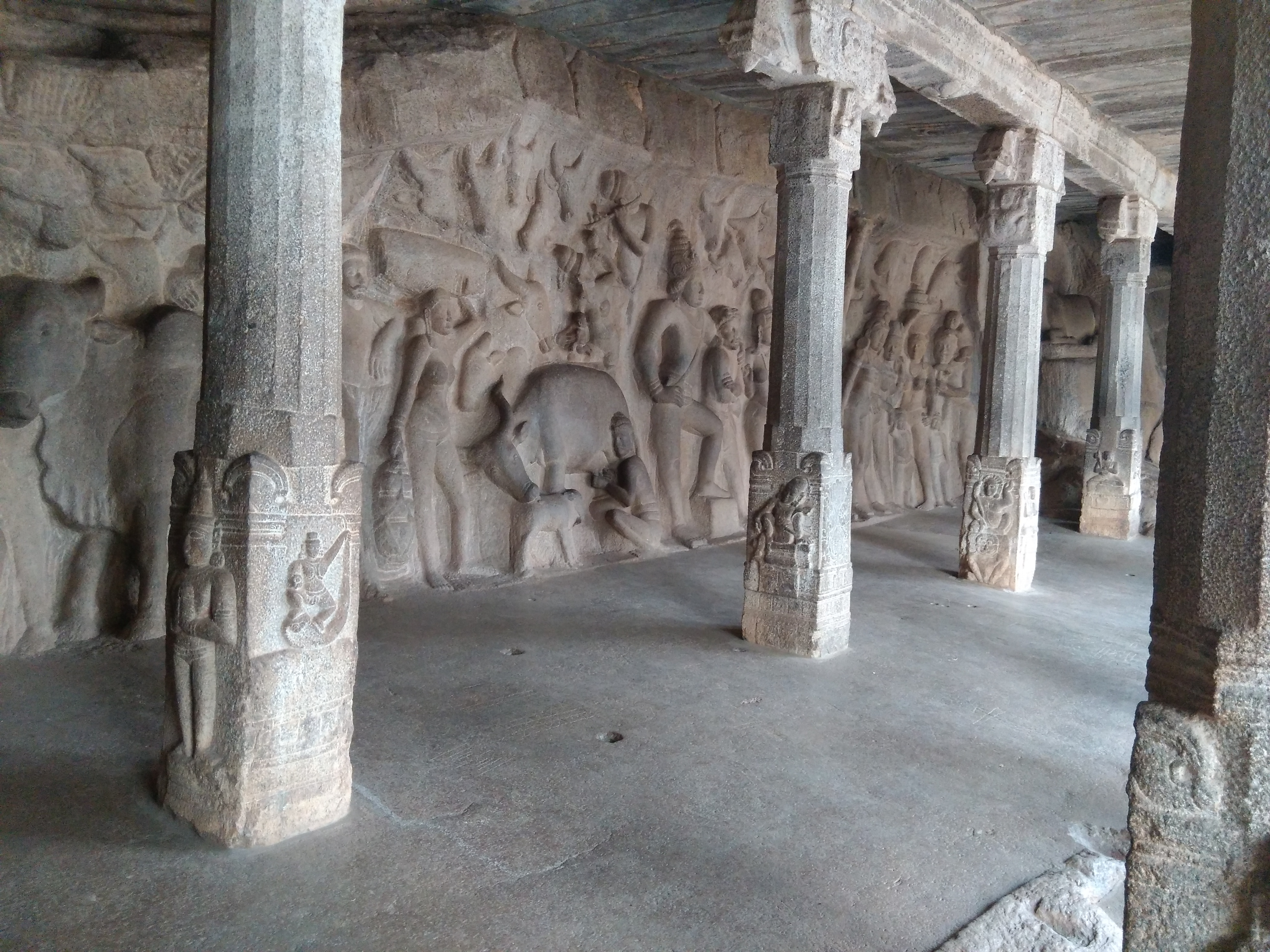
Pillars and bas-reliefs based on Mahabharatha and Harivamsa

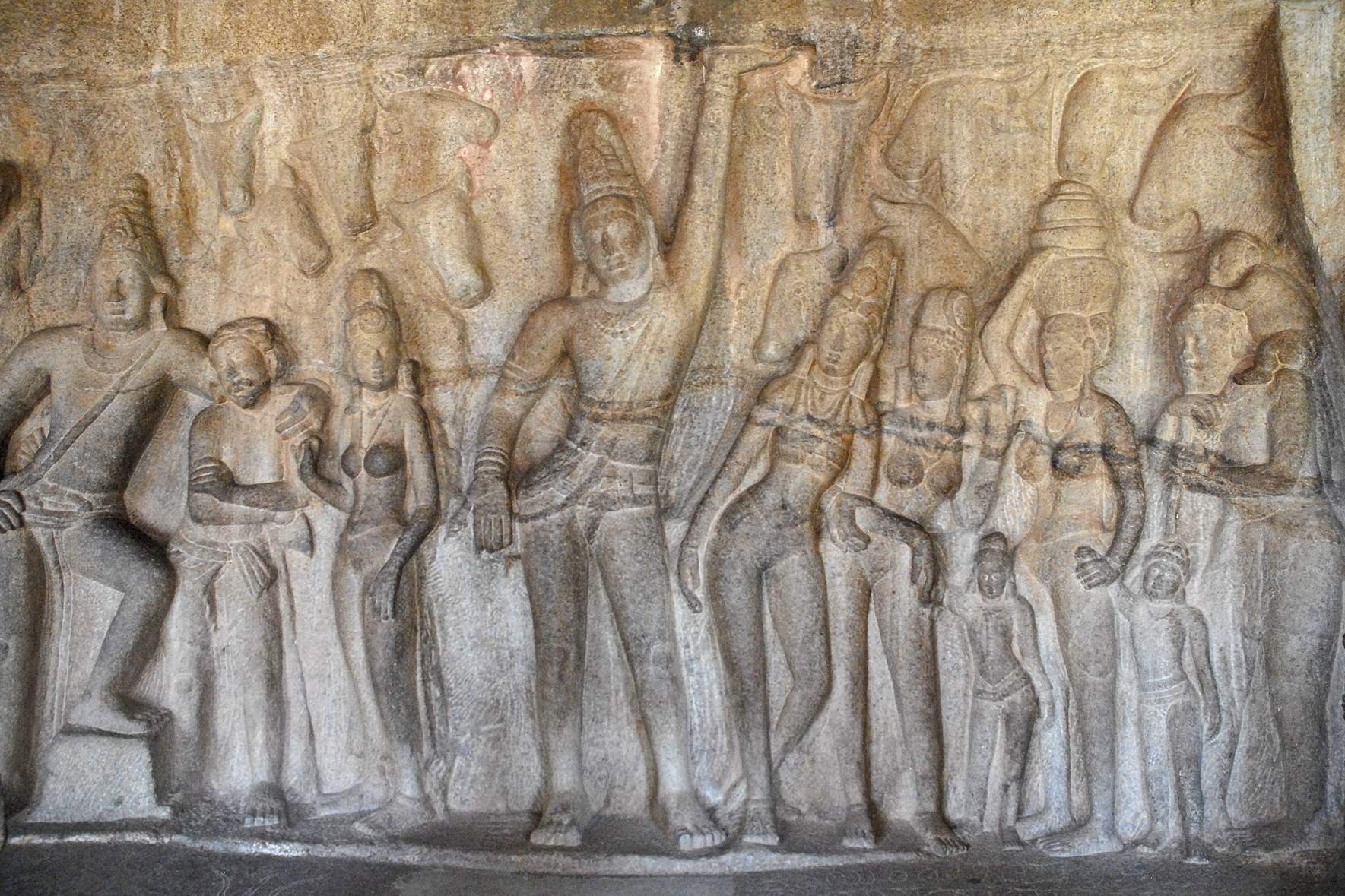
Krishna holding Goverdhana sculpture at Mahabalipuram dating 6th century AD

=== Tolkāppiyam ===
Perumal is considered to be another name of Vishnu, and was traditionally the deity associated with the forests. Mayon is indicated to be the deity associated with the mullai tiṇai (pastoral landscape) in the Tolkappiyam. Tolkappiyar mentions Mayon when he referred to deities in the different land divisions. which gives a hint that he might be a scholar who follows Vaishnavism.

=== Paripāṭal ===
The Paripādal (Tamil: பரிபாடல், meaning the paripadal-metre anthology) is a classical Tamil poetic work and traditionally the fifth of the Eight Anthologies (Ettuthokai) in the Sangam literature. According to Tolkappiyam, Paripadal is a kind of verse dealing only with love (akapporul) and does not fall under the general classification of verses. It has a minimum of 25 lines and a maximum of 400 lines. Tamil Sangam literature (200 BCE to 500 CE) mentions Mayon or the "dark one," as the supreme deity who creates, sustains, and destroys the universe and was worshipped in the mountains of Tamilakam. The earliest verses of Paripadal describe the glory of Perumal in poetic terms. Many poems of the Paripadal consider Perumal as the supreme god of the Tamils. Paripāṭal also mentions that Vishnu is only Shiva and Brahma; he is everything and is the supreme god and represents himself as different gods.

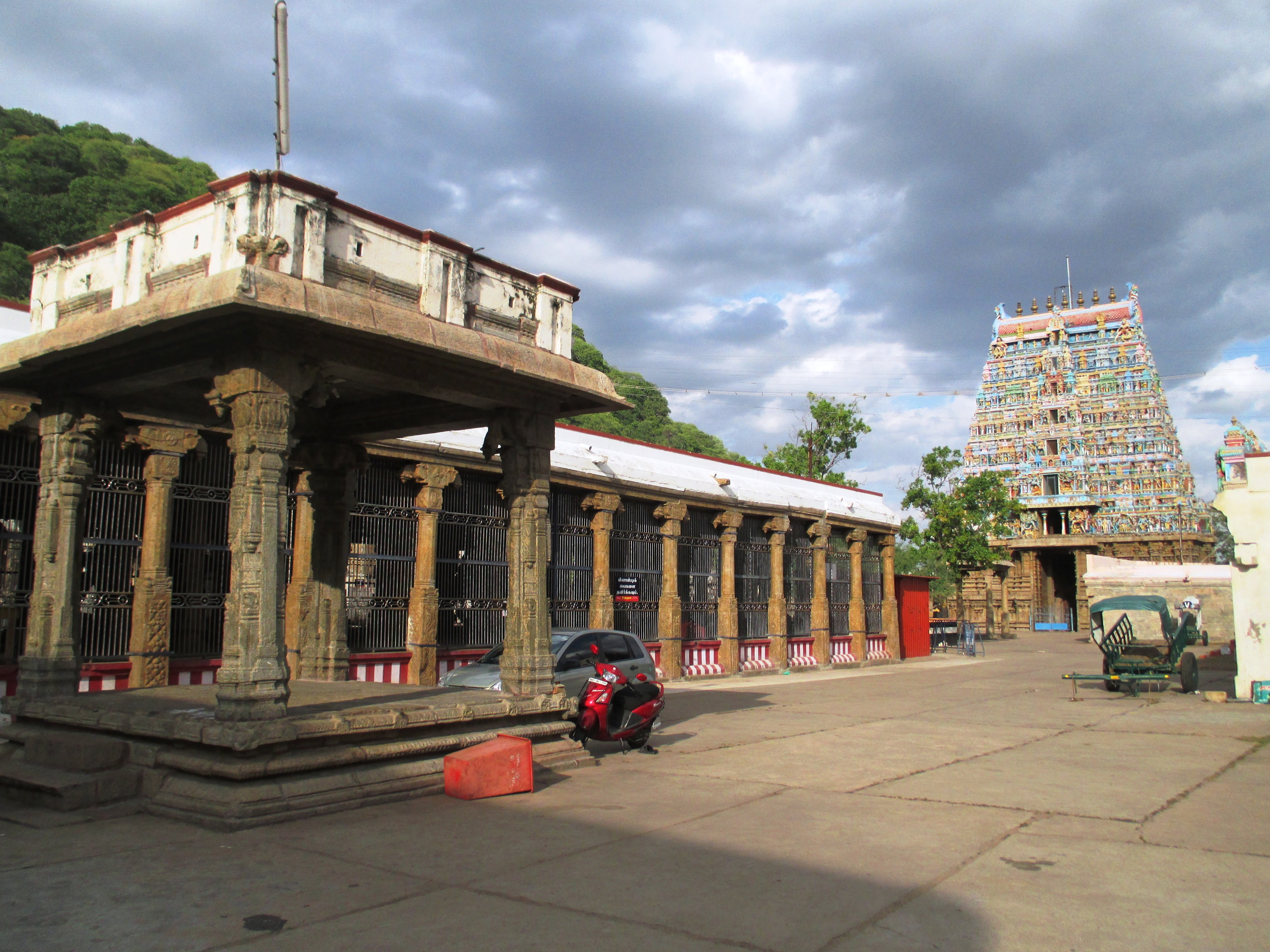
Sundarabahu Perumal Temple Mentioned in Paripadal.

தீயினுள் தெறல் நீ;
பூவினுள் நாற்றம் நீ;
கல்லினுள் மணியும் நீ;
சொல்லினுள் வாய்மை நீ;
அறத்தினுள் அன்பு நீ;
மறத்தினுள் மைந்து நீ;
வேதத்து மறை நீ;
பூதத்து முதலும் நீ;
வெஞ் சுடர் ஒளியும் நீ;
திங்களுள் அளியும் நீ;
அனைத்தும் நீ;
அனைத்தின் உட்பொருளும் நீ;

— Paripadal, iii: 63–68
Translation:

In fire, you are the heat;
in blossoms, the fragrance;
among the stones, you are the diamond;
in speech, truth;
among virtues, you are love;
in valour—strength;
in the Veda, you are the secret;
among elements, the primordial;
in the burning sun, the light;
in moonshine, its sweetness;
you are all,
and you are the substance and meaning of all.

— F Gros, K Zvelebil

=== Maturaikkāñci ===
Maduraikanchi (Tamil: மதுரைக் காஞ்சி), is an ancient Tamil poem in the Sangam literature. Lines 497 to 511 allude to gods and goddesses in temples like Thirumohoor Kalamegaperumal temple and Koodal Azhagar temple with iconographic items of Hinduism. Maha Vishnu is called the 'ruler of the three worlds' and the "Supreme Deity" and it identifies Rama and Krishna as his incarnations of Maha Vishnu. He is alluded to with "God who protects the world" and also as Tirivikrama - the lord who measured the three worlds. A bathing festival with rituals that include a dip in the water to "cleanse their sins" is mentioned in the poem. Chanting of the Vedas is mentioned in lines 512–518, The lines related to the Vedas, states Chelliah, alludes to the jivanmukta ideology found in Hinduism. Maduraikanchi also details the Thiruvonam festival celebrated in the Koodal Azhagar temple, Madurai.

=== Akanaṉūṟu ===
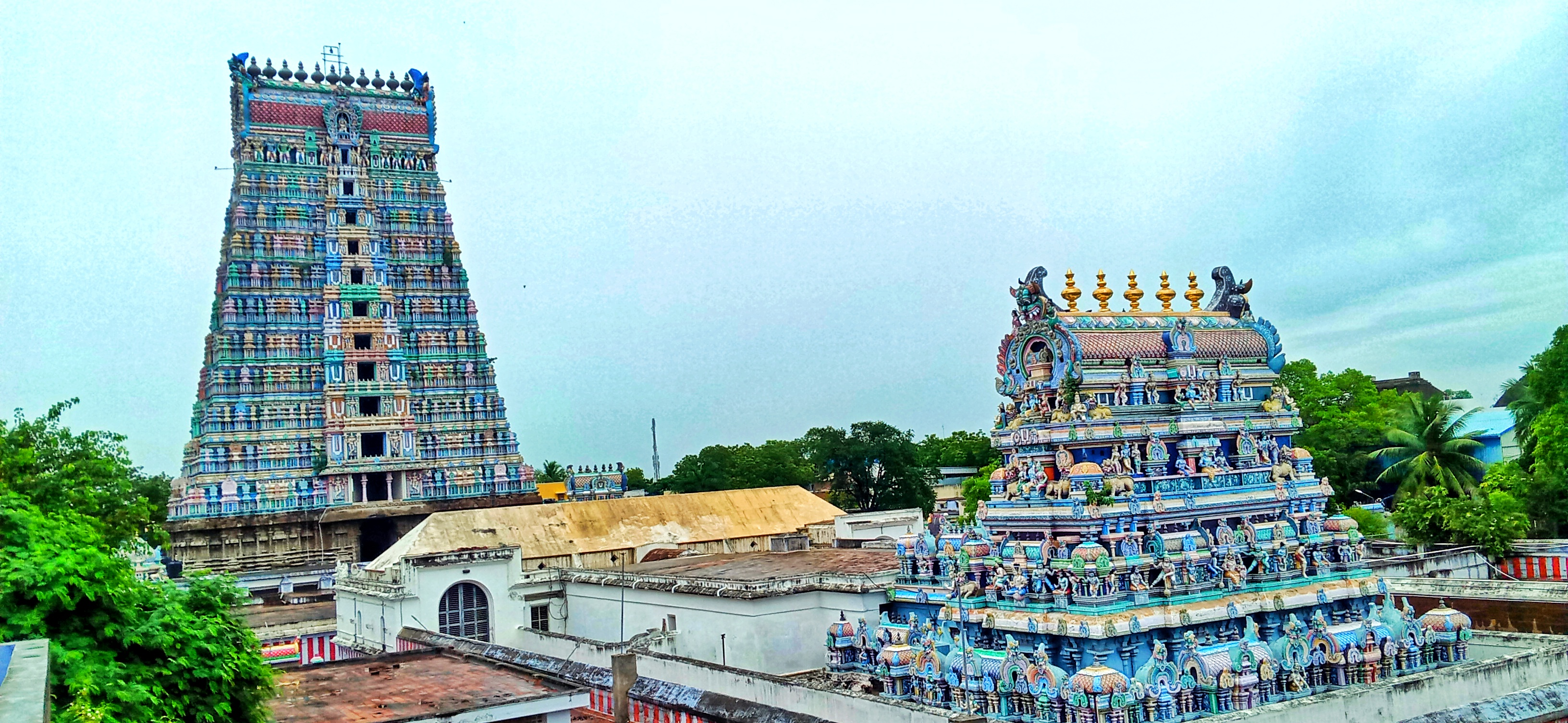
Srivilliputhur Andal temple is the official symbol of the Government of Tamil Nadu

Several poems echo the Hindu puranic legends about Parashurama, Rama, Krishna and others in the Akanaṉūṟu . According to Alf Hiltebeitel – an Indian Religions and Sanskrit Epics scholar, the Akanaṉūṟu has the earliest known mentions of some stories such as "Krishna stealing sarees of Gopis" which is found later in north Indian literature, making it probable that some of the ideas from Tamil Hindu scholars inspired the Sanskrit scholars in the north and the Bhagavata Purana, or vice versa. However the text Harivamsa which is complex, containing layers that go back to the 1st or 2nd century BCE, consists of parts that mention Krishna playing with Gopis and stealing their sarees.

The Akanāṉūṟu has a reference to the Ramayana in poem 70. The poem places a triumphant Rama at Dhanushkodi, sitting under a Banyan tree, involved in some secret discussions when the birds are chirping away. This seems to indicate that the story of the Ramayana was familiar in the Tamil lands before the Kamba Ramayanam of the 12th century.

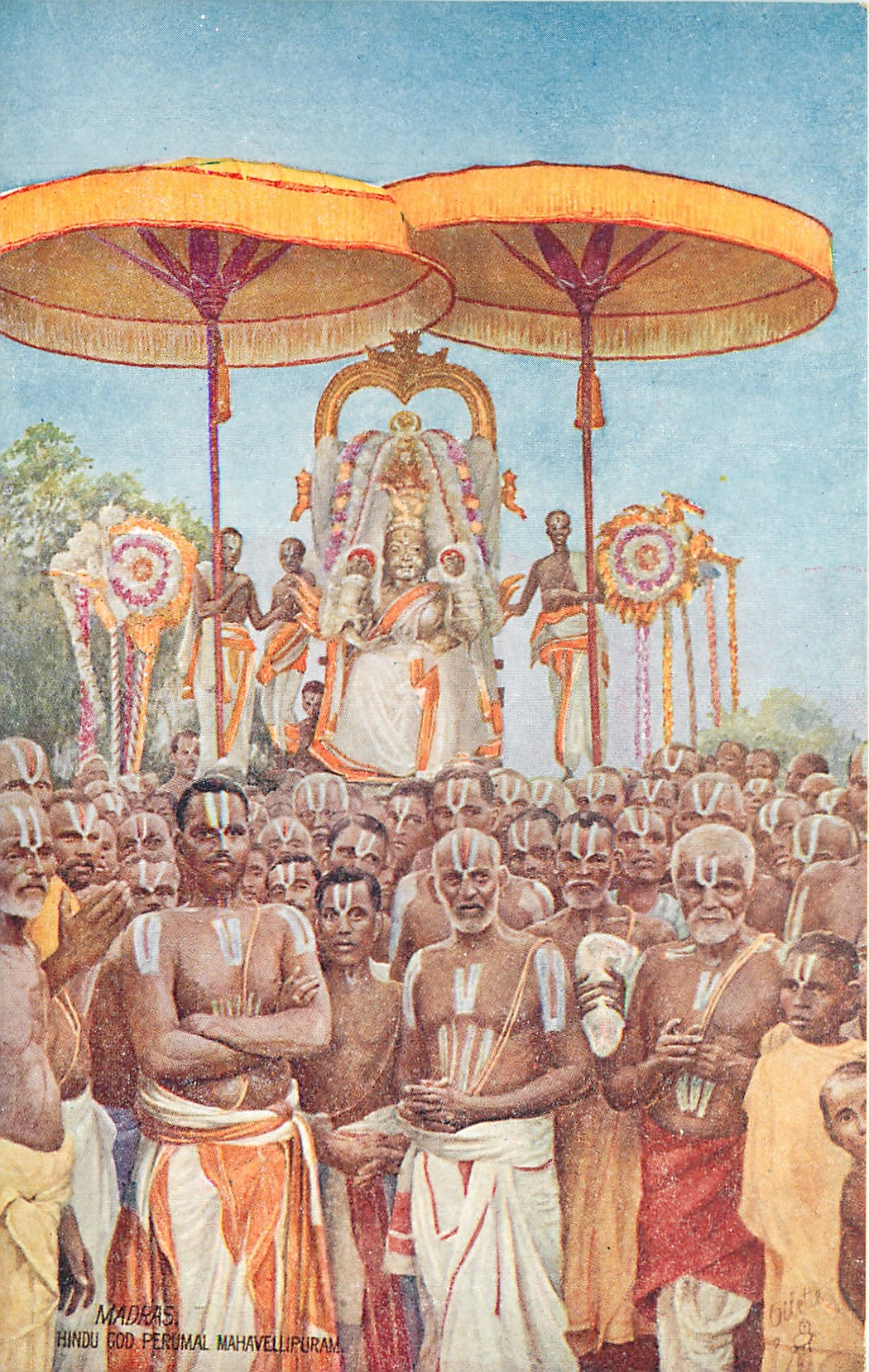
Procession of the Tamil deity Perumal, with Vaishnavaite saints

=== Purananuru ===
The earliest reference to the story of the Ramayana is found in the Purananuru which is dated from the 1st century BCE and 5th century CE. Purananuru 378, attributed to the poet Unpodipasunkudaiyar, written in praise of the Chola king Ilancetcenni. The poem makes the analogy of a poet receiving royal gifts and that worn by the relatives of the poet as being unworthy of their status,that worn by the relatives as unworthy to the event in the Ramayana, where Sita drops her jewels when abducted by Ravana and these jewels being picked up by red-faced monkeys who delightfully wear the ornaments.

The Purananuru poems use words, phrases, and metaphors, including references to the Himalayas of "immeasurable heights", Vishnu, Shiva, the four Vedas, the Ramayana, rivers, and other aspects.

=== Other Sangam works Which mention Vishnu ===
- Kalittokai is notable for including allusions and references to pan-Indian love and moral legends found in Epics– and Puranas–genre Sanskrit texts. According to Kamil Zvelebil, some examples in the Kalittokai include Krishna an avathara of Maha Vishnu killing his uncle Kansa in poems 52 and 134, Duryodhana's evil plans to kill the Pandava brothers in poem 25, the battle of Murugan and Surapadma in poem 27. An event mentioned in the epic Ramayana, of Ravana lifting the Kailasa is described in the Poem 139 of Lines 33 to 37, Bhima in poem 52, the love story of Urvasi and Tilottama in poem 109, among others.
- The Patiṟṟuppattu (Tamil: பதிற்றுப்பத்து, Malayalam: പതിറ്റുപ്പത്ത്, lit. Ten Tens, sometimes spelled Pathitrupathu,) is a classical Tamil poetic work and one of the Eight Anthologies (Ettuthokai) in Sangam literature. Its invocatory poem is about Mayon, or Perumal (Vishnu). They mention the Hindu deities Vishnu, Shiva, Murugan and Korravai (Uma, Durga), and their worship by warriors and the king. The poems, epilogues, and colophons are significant in studies of ancient culture and sociology.
- Malaipaṭukaṭām is an ancient Tamil poem in the Pattuppāṭṭu anthology of the Sangam literature. The lengthy poem mentions Maha Vishnu primarily. Maha Vishnu was considered the "Supreme Deity" in the poem and worshiped by many saints and kings. It also mentions the goddess of wealth, Lakshmi in lines 463–464 and the "god on whose breast she sits enthroned". The Malaipatukatam uses the word ool (Sanskrit: karma).
- Paṭṭiṉappālai is a Tamil poem in the ancient Sangam literature. It contains 301 lines, of which 296 lines are about the port city of Kaveripoompattinam. It is notable for its mention of the early Chola kingdom as a cosmopolitan region, where Hindu and Jain monasteries and communities co-existed. It mentions the worship of Maha Vishnu, Mahalakshmi and Murugan.
- Perumpāṇāṟṟuppaṭai is an ancient Tamil poem in the Pattuppattu anthology of the Sangam literature. It contains 500 lines in the akaval meter. It is one of five arruppatai genre poems and was a guide to other bards seeking a patron for their art. It mentions Maha Vishnu and describes him as the god who is "tall, dark-skinned", the Supreme God from whom "the four-faced god was born" (a Vedic legend about Brahma being born from Vishnu's navel). In its similes, it mentions the Ganges river, the Pandavas of the Mahabharata, and the rishis (sages) adept with yoga. According to Hudson, the poem is notable that it explicitly mentions three temples of Maha Vishnu namely Ulagalantha Perumal Temple, Yathothkari Perumal Temple, Pandava Thoothar Perumal Temple and alludes to one additional temple the Varadharaja Perumal Temple as the main temple for these three Perumals. The similes used in the poem are those found in the Vedic and Puranic mythologies of Hinduism.

=== Mullaippāṭṭu ===
Mullaippāṭṭu (Tamil: முல்லைப்பாட்டு, lit. "the forest or jungle song") is an ancient Tamil poem in the Sangam literature. Authored by Napputanar, it is the shortest poem in the Ten Idylls (Pattuppāṭṭu) anthology, consisting of 103 lines in akaval meter. The poem is "one of the most beautiful of the Pattuppattu songs, as stated by Zvelebil.

The short poem mentions the Hindu god Vishnu through an elaborate simile. Lines 46–47 of Mullaippattu mentions Brahmin yogis in ochre-colored clothes carrying three staves and called as "Mukkol Pakavars" and indicates that only Vaishnava saints were holding Tridanda and were prominent during the period and considered Maha Vishnu as the Supreme god. The poem has about 500 words, predominantly Tamil. It has 13 Sanskrit loan words and 2 non-Tamil provincial words.

=== Manimekalai ===
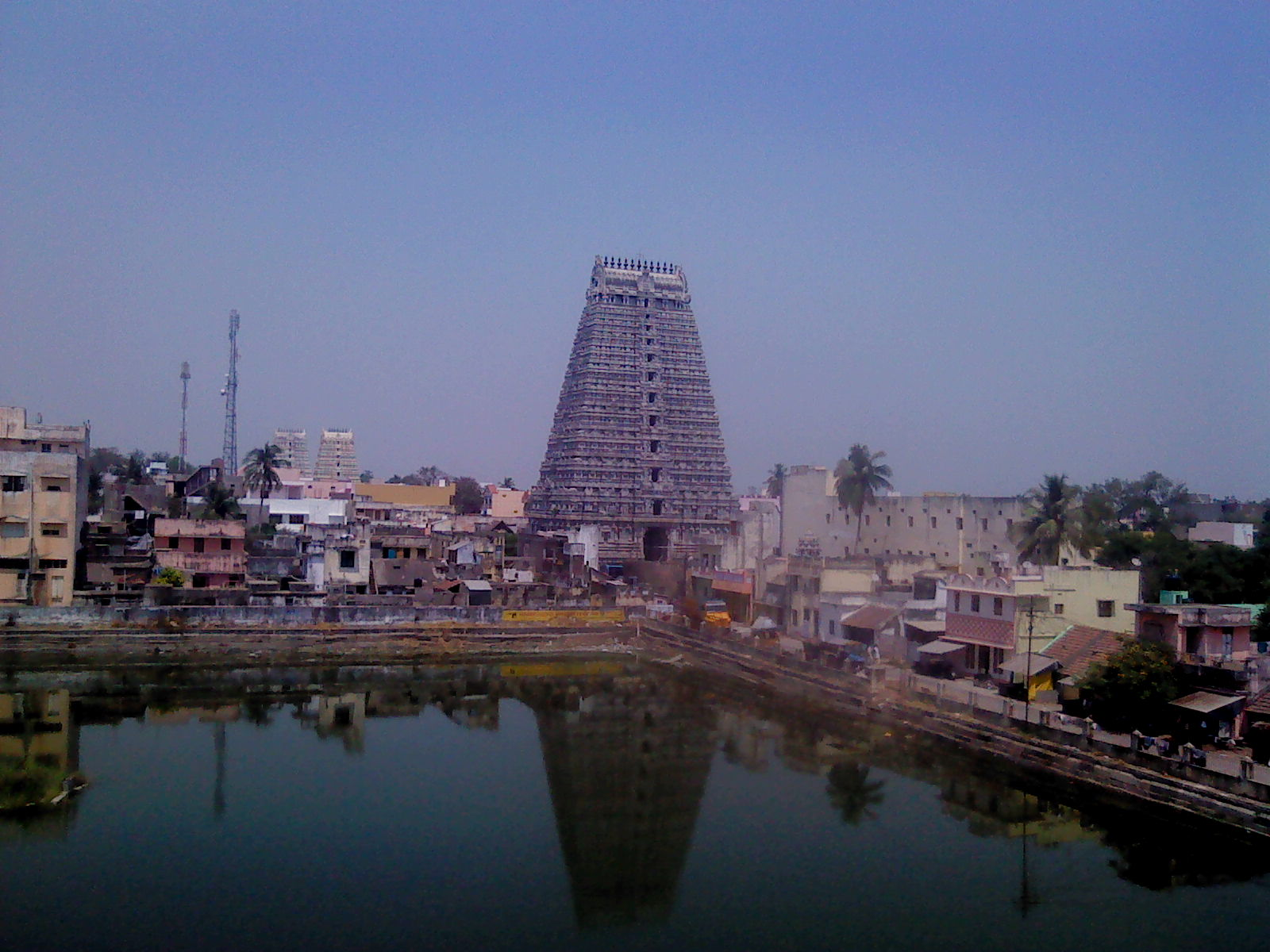
Thirvikrama Perumal Templewhich is mentioned in Agananuru, Purananuru, Natrinai, Kurunthogai and Divya Prabhandham.

Manimekalai written as the sequel to the Silappatikaram by the Buddhist poet Chithalai Chathanar, narrates the tale of Manimekalai, the daughter of Kovalan and Madhavi, and her journey to become a Buddhist Bhikkuni.

Certain verses from the epic show Maha Vishnu as the father of Brahma and who gave Vedas to the entire universe and is considered as the Paramatma - The Supreme Deity of the World.

An example of a verse from the Canto XIII of Manimekalai:

"Aputra then meets and accuses the Brahmins of twisting the meaning of the Veda verses taught by Brahma born from the navel of Maha Vishnu who holds a golden disc as his weapon. Aputra reminds the Brahmins that the greatest Vedic teachers such as Vasishtha and Agastya were born of low birth."

This epic also makes several references to the Ramayana, such as a setu (bridge) being built by monkeys in canto 5, line 37 (however the location is Kanyakumari rather than Dhanushkodi). In another reference, in canto 17, lines 9 to 16, the epic talks about Rama being the incarnation of Trivikrama or Netiyon, and he built the setup with the help of monkeys who hurled huge rocks into the ocean to build the bridge. Further, canto 18, lines 19 to 26, refers to the illegitimate love of Indra for Ahalya, the wife of Rishi Gautama. The epic again mentions Rama as Vishnu, from the story Ramayana, It states that Rama built a link (bridge) to Sri Lanka, but a curse of an ascetic dissolved the bridge link.

=== Silappatikaram ===
The Silappatikaram (transl. The tale of an anklet) written by a prince turned Jain monk Ilango Adigal, dated to the 2nd century AD or later. The epic narrates the tale of Kovalan, son of a wealthy merchant, his wife Kannagi, and his lover Madhavi, and has many references to the Ramayana, avatars of Para Brahman and temples of Maha Vishnu. It describes the fate of Poompuhar suffering the same agony as experienced by Ayodhya when Rama leaves for exile to the forest as instructed by his father (Dikshitar, 1939, p. 193). The Aycciyarkuravai section (canto 27), makes mention of the Lord who could measure the three worlds, going to the forest with his brother, waging a war against Lanka and destroying it with fire (Dikshitar, 1939, p. 237). These references indicate that the author was well aware of the story of the Ramayana in the 2nd century AD.

It also mentions Srirangam Ranganathaswamy Temple which was visited and built by many kings and praised by saints (book 11, lines 35–40). The temple was first built by the Chola ruler, Dharmavarma. The Kaveri River flood destroyed the temple, and later, the early Cholas King Killivalavan who found the vimana and the idol of Ranganathaswamy rebuilt the temple complex as is present today.

According to D. Dennis Hudson – a World Religions and Tamil literature scholar, the Cilappatikaram is the earliest and first complete Tamil reference to Pillai (Nila, Nappinnai, Radha), who is described in the epic as the cowherd lover of Krishna. The epic includes abundant stories and allusions to Krishna and his stories, which are also found in ancient Sanskrit Puranas. In the canto where Kannaki is waiting for Kovalan to return after selling her anklet to a Madurai merchant, she is in a village with cowgirls. These cowherd girls enact a dance, where one plays Mayavan (Krishna), another girl plays Tammunon (Balarama), while a third plays Pinnai (Nappinnai). The dance begins with a song listing Krishna's heroic deeds and his fondness for Nappinnai, then they dance where sage Narada plays music. Such scenes where cowgirls imitate Krishna's life story are also found in Sanskrit poems of Harivamsa and Vishnu Purana, both generally dated to be older than Cilappatikaram. The Tamil epic calls portions of it as vāla caritai nāṭaṅkaḷ, which mirrors the phrase balacarita nataka – dramas about the story of the child Krishna" – in the more ancient Sanskrit kavyas.

The oldest direct reference to Venkateswara Temple in Tamil literature is from the Silappatikaram text. The Silappatikaram states the beauty of Maha Vishnu in Venkateswara Temple and Maha Vishnu's greatness. The author Ilango Adigal mentions the Venkateswara Temple. A few verses from the Silappatikaram which mention the Venkateswara Temple.

Silappatikaram, vēṉiṟ kātai:1-2

Translation
neṭiyōṉ kuṉṟamum toṭiyōḷ pauvamum tamiḻ varampaṟutta taṇpuṉal nalnāṭṭu.

Meaning
Spring held sway over the fertile Tamil country, bounded in the north by the Viṣṇu’s hill, and in the south by the Kumari’s sea.

Silappatikaram, Kāṭukāṇ kātai: 41–51

Translation
vīṅkunī raruvi vēṅkaṭa meṉṉum ōṅkuyar malaiyat tucci mīmicai virikatir ñāyiṟun tiṅkaḷum viḷaṅki irumaruṅ kōṅkiya iṭainilait tāṉattu miṉṉukkōṭi yuṭuttu viḷaṅkuviṟ pūṇṭu naṉṉiṟa mēkam niṉṟatu pōlap pakaiyaṇaṅ kāḻiyum pālveṇ caṅkamum takaipeṟu tāmaraik kaiyi ṉēnti nalaṅkiḷar āram mārpiṟ pūṇṭu polampū vāṭaiyiṟ polintu tōṉṟiya ceṅkaṇ neṭiyōṉ niṉṟa vaṇṇamum.

Meaning
(I also came to see) the beauty of the red-eyed Lord, holding in His beautiful lotus-hands the discus which is death to His enemies, and also the milk-white conch; (to see Him) wearing a garland of tender flowers on His chest, and draped in golden flowers; and dwelling on the topmost crest of the tall and lofty hill named vēṅkaṭam.

Here, Neṭiyōṉ kuṉṟam means “Vishnu's mountain” and toṭiyōḷ pauvam means "Kumari goddess sea". Netiyon is another name dedicated to Maha Vishnu in Ancient Tamilakam. ceṅkaṇ neṭiyōṉ means “Red-eyed Vishnu” and Vēṅkaṭam refers to Venkateswara Temple. Maha Vishnu is being referenced as the Red-eyed lord even in the book Vishnu Sahasranama which is featured in the Anushasana Parva of Mahabharatha. This shows that Ilango Adigal and ancient Tamils were aware of the Vishnu Sahasranama which is much older than the Silappatikaram.

=== Thirukural ===
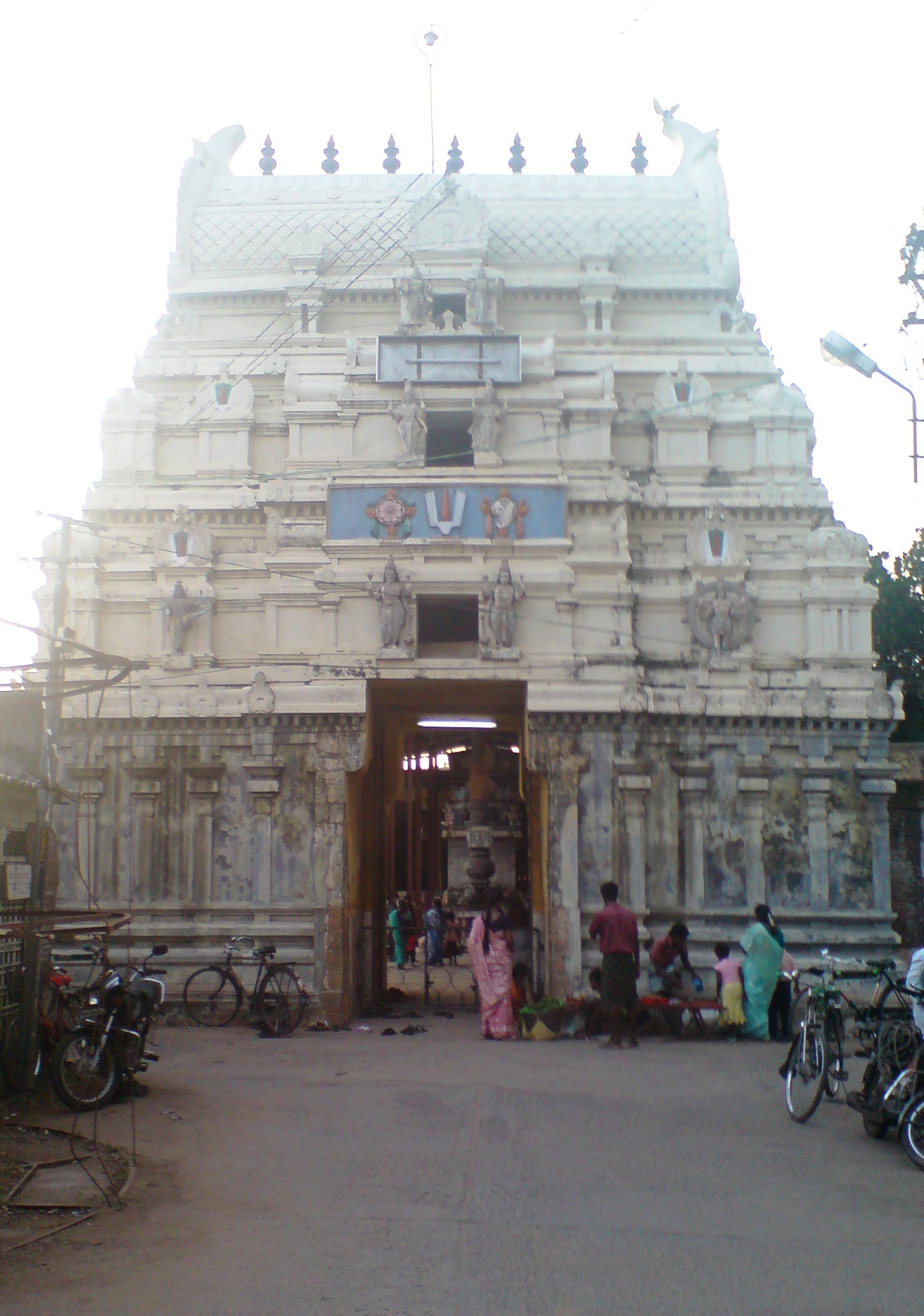
The Thirivikrama Perumal Temple, Sirkazhi is said to be mentioned by Valluvar in his 610th Thirukural

Thirukural is a classic Tamil language text consisting of 1,330 short couplets, or kurals, of seven words each. In the introductory chapters of the Kural, Valluvar cites Indra, the king of heaven, to exemplify the virtue of conquest over one's senses. According to Tamil Hindu scholars such as Parimelalakar, other concepts and teachings found in Valluvar's text and also found in Hindu texts include Vedas, gods (Trimurti), sattva, guṇa, munis and sadhus (renouncers), rebirth, affirmation of a primordial God, among others. According to Purnalingam Pillai, who is known for his critique of Brahminism, a rational analysis of the Valluvar's work suggests that he was a Hindu, and not a Jain. Similarly, J. J. Glazov, a Tamil literature scholar and the translator of the Kural text into the Russian language, sees "Thiruvalluvar as a Hindu by faith", according to a review by Kamil Zvelebil.

Thiruvalluvar's mentioning of Maha Vishnu in couplets 610 and 1103 and Lakshmi in couplets 167, 408, 519, 565, 568, 616, and 617 hints at the Vaishnavite beliefs of Valluvar.

Example:-

குறள் 610: மடியிலா மன்னவன் எய்தும் அடியளந்தான் தாஅய தெல்லாம் ஒருங்கு.

Couplet Explanation: The king who never gives way to idleness will obtain entire possession of (the whole earth) passed over by Vishnu who measured (the worlds) with His foot. (Thirukural Number 610).

V. V. S. Aiyar quotes that the 610th Tirukkural mentions about the temple Thirivikrama Perumal. It is also the place where Thirumangai Alvar stayed after coming back from North India having defeated Thirugnana Sambandar in a debate and proving Maha Vishnu is the Supreme Lord.

Agananuru, Purananuru, Natrinai and Kurunthogai have mentions about the Ulagalantha Perumal Temple. Malayaman Tirumudikari, the ruler of Thirukovilur, was lavished praise in the texts for his charitable disposition to the Thiruvikrama Perumal Temple.

== Alvar literature ==
The Alvars (Tamil: ஆழ்வார், romanized: Āḻvār, lit. 'The Immersed') were the Tamil poet-saints of South India who espoused bhakti (devotion) to the Hindu deity Maha Vishnu, in their songs of longing, ecstasy, and service. They are venerated in Vaishnavism, which regards Vishnu as the Ultimate Reality.

The devotional outpourings of the Alvars, composed during the early medieval period of Tamil history, were the catalysts behind the Bhakti Movement through their hymns of worship to Vishnu and his avatars. They praised the Divya Desams, the 108 divine realms of deities affiliated with Vaishnavism. The poetry of the Alvars echoes bhakti to God through love, and in the ecstasy of such devotions, they sang hundreds of songs that embodied both depth of feeling and the felicity of expressions. The collection of their hymns is known as the Naalayira Divya Prabandham. The bhakti literature that sprang from Alvars has contributed to the establishment and sustenance of a culture that deviated from the Vedic religion and rooted itself in devotion as the only path for salvation. In addition, they contributed to Tamil devotional verses independent of a knowledge of Sanskrit.

=== Naalayira Divya Prabandham ===
The Divya Prabandham sings the praises of Narayana (Vishnu) and his many forms. The Alvars sang these songs at various sacred shrines known as the Divya Desams. The Tamil Vaishnavites are also known as Ubhaya Vedanti (those that follow both Vedas, that is, the Sanskrit Rigveda, Yajurveda, Samaveda, and Atharvaveda, as well as the Tamil-language Tiruvaymoli, a work which devotees of Sri Vaishnavism regard as the Tamil Veda). In many temples — Srirangam, for example — the chanting of the Divya Prabandham forms a major part of the daily service. It is also recited in some North Indian Vaishnavite temples, such as Badrinath. The Divya Prabandham is recited along with the Vedas, and it is given equal status to the Vedas in the Tenkalai denomination of Sri Vaishnavism, largely due to the efforts of Ramanuja who enshrined the Divya Prabandham on the same pedestal as the Vedas.

Prominent among its 4,000 verses are the over 1,100 verses known as the Tiruvaymoli ("verses of the sacred mouth"), composed by Nammalvar (Kaari Maaran, Sadagopan of Alvarthirunagari Temple) and which forms the third portion of the overall Divya Prabandham. Nammalvar self-identifies as a lovelorn gopi pining for Krishna.

The compendium begins with the Tirupallantu, a benedictory hymn written by Periyalvar, wishing long life to Vishnu.

=== Combination of Sanskrit Vaishnavism and Tamil Vaishnavism ===
Nathamuni (10th century), combined the two traditions, by drawing on Sanskrit philosophical tradition and combining it with the aesthetic and emotional appeal of the Tamil Bhakti movement pioneers called the Alvars. Sri Vaishnavism developed in Tamil Nadu in the 9th century after Nathamuni returned from a pilgrimage to Vrindavan in north India (modern Uttar Pradesh).

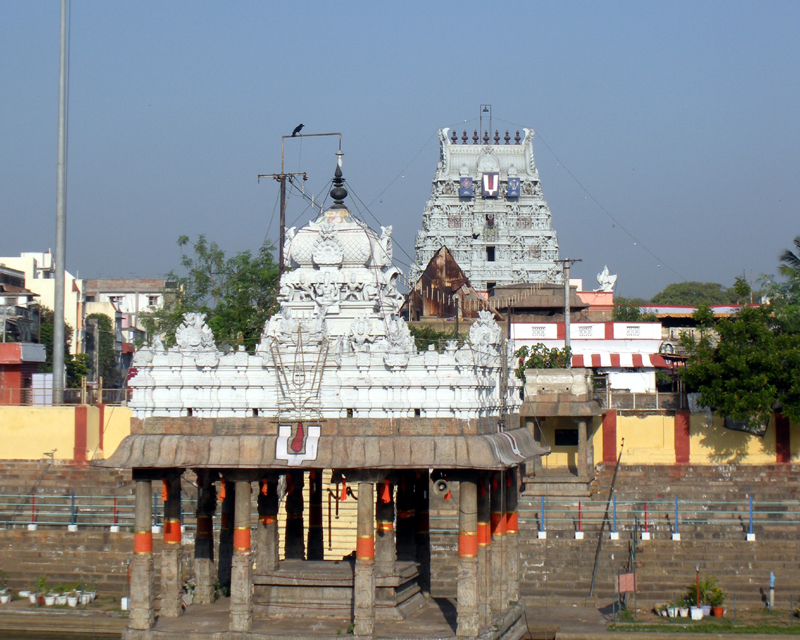
One of the 108 Divya Desam present in Chennai

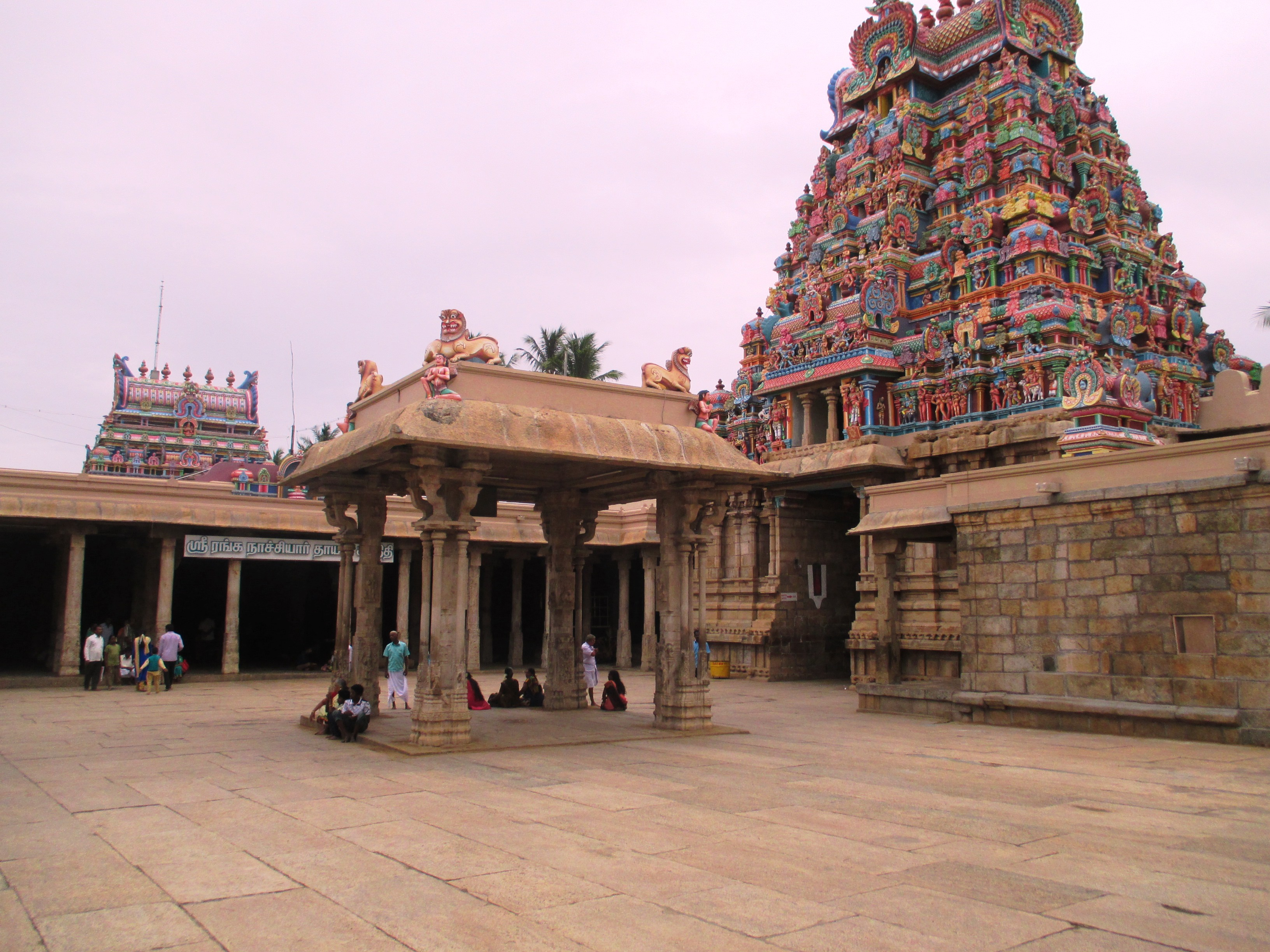
The hall, located in front of Ranganayaki's shrine, where Kambar is believed to have recited his works on Kamba Ramayanam and accepted by Vaishnava Acharya Naathamuni

Nathamuni's ideas were continued by Yamunacharya, who maintained that the Vedas, Vaikhanasa and Pancaratras are equal, devotional rituals and bhakti are important practices. The legacy of Yamunacharya was continued by Ramanuja, but they never met. Legend goes that Ramanuja saw Yamunacharya's corpse, which had three fingers curled. Ramanuja was told that they represented the three wishes that Yamunacharya had revealed before he passed. One of the wishes was that Ramanuja should write a commentary on the Brahma Sutras. Ramanuja, a scholar who studied in an Advaita Vedanta monastery and disagreed with some of the ideas of Advaita, became the most influential leader of Sri Vaishnavism. He developed the Visistadvaita ("qualified non-dualism") philosophy.

==== Kamba Ramayanam ====
During the period of Nathamuni, Kambar, or Kavichakravarthy Kamban (1180 CE–1250 CE), wrote the Ramavataram, popularly known as Kambaramayanam, the Tamil version of the epic Ramayana.

The original version of Ramayana was written by Valmiki. Kambar was inspired by Valmiki and rewrote the Ramayana in Tamil. The Ramavataram or Kamba Ramayanam of Kamban is an epic of about 11,000 stanzas. The Rama-avataram or Rama-kathai as it was originally accepted into the holy precincts in the presence of Vaishnava Acharya Naathamuni. Kambar is believed to have come to the Srirangam Ranganathaswamy Temple to get the approval of his work from scholars. The Vaishnava Acharya Naathamuni and Jain scholar Tirunarungundam honoured the work and it resulted in Tamil and Sanskrit scholars approving the work. The open hall where he recited his verse lies close to the Ranganayaki shrine within the temple and now called as the Kamba Ramayana Mandapam.

== Gallery of Old Vishnu Temples ==
An 1870 photo of the gopurams in the Srirangam Ranganathaswamy Temple

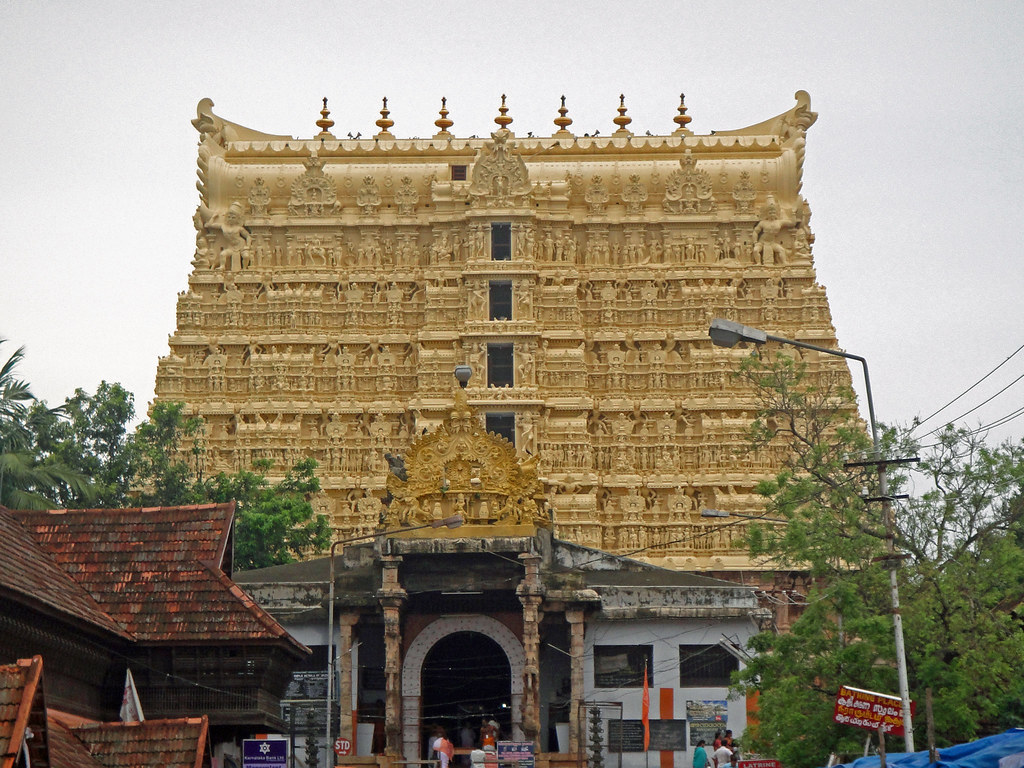
Padmanabhaswamy Temple

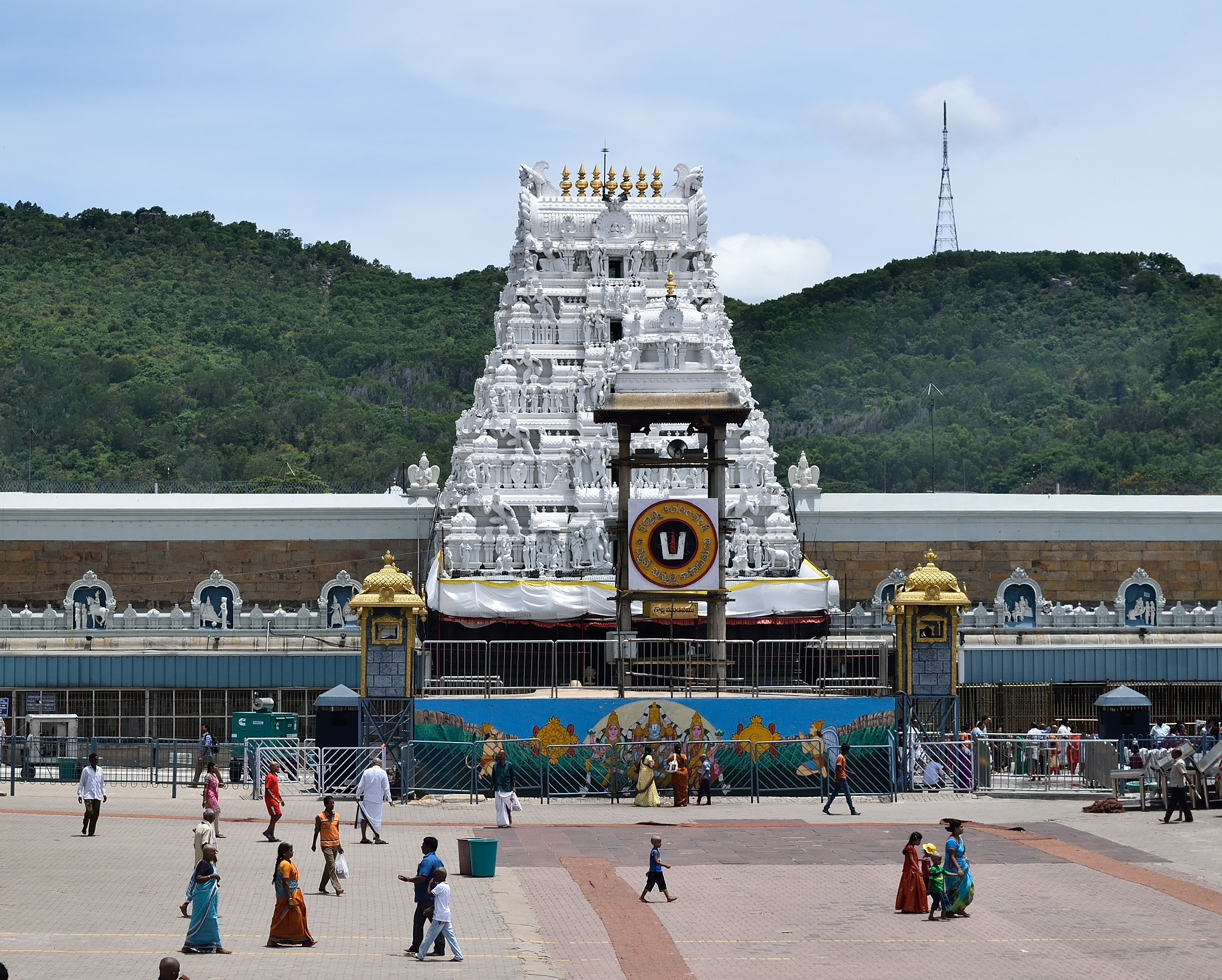
Venkateswara Temple, Tirumala

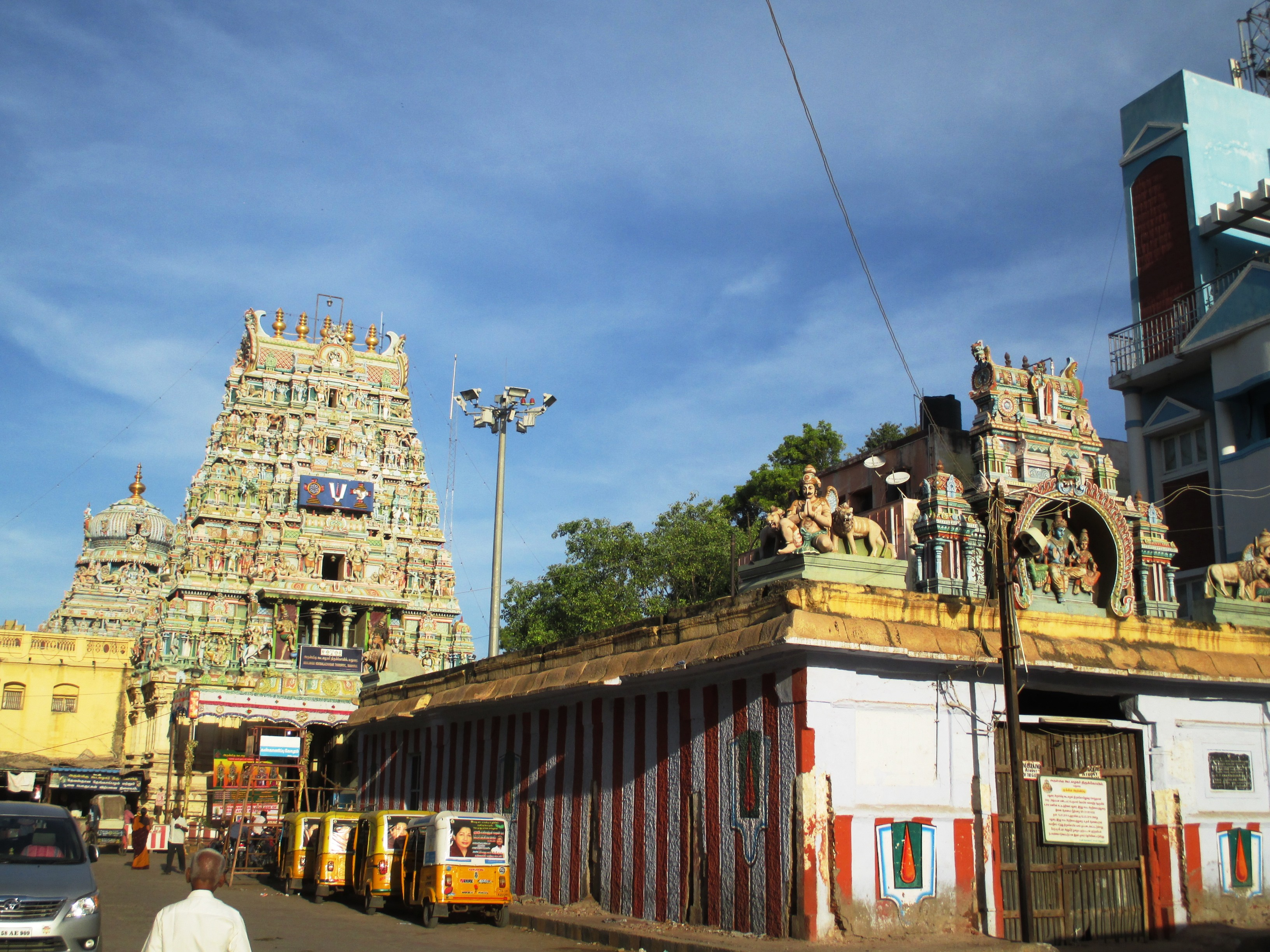
Koodal Azhagar temple, Madurai

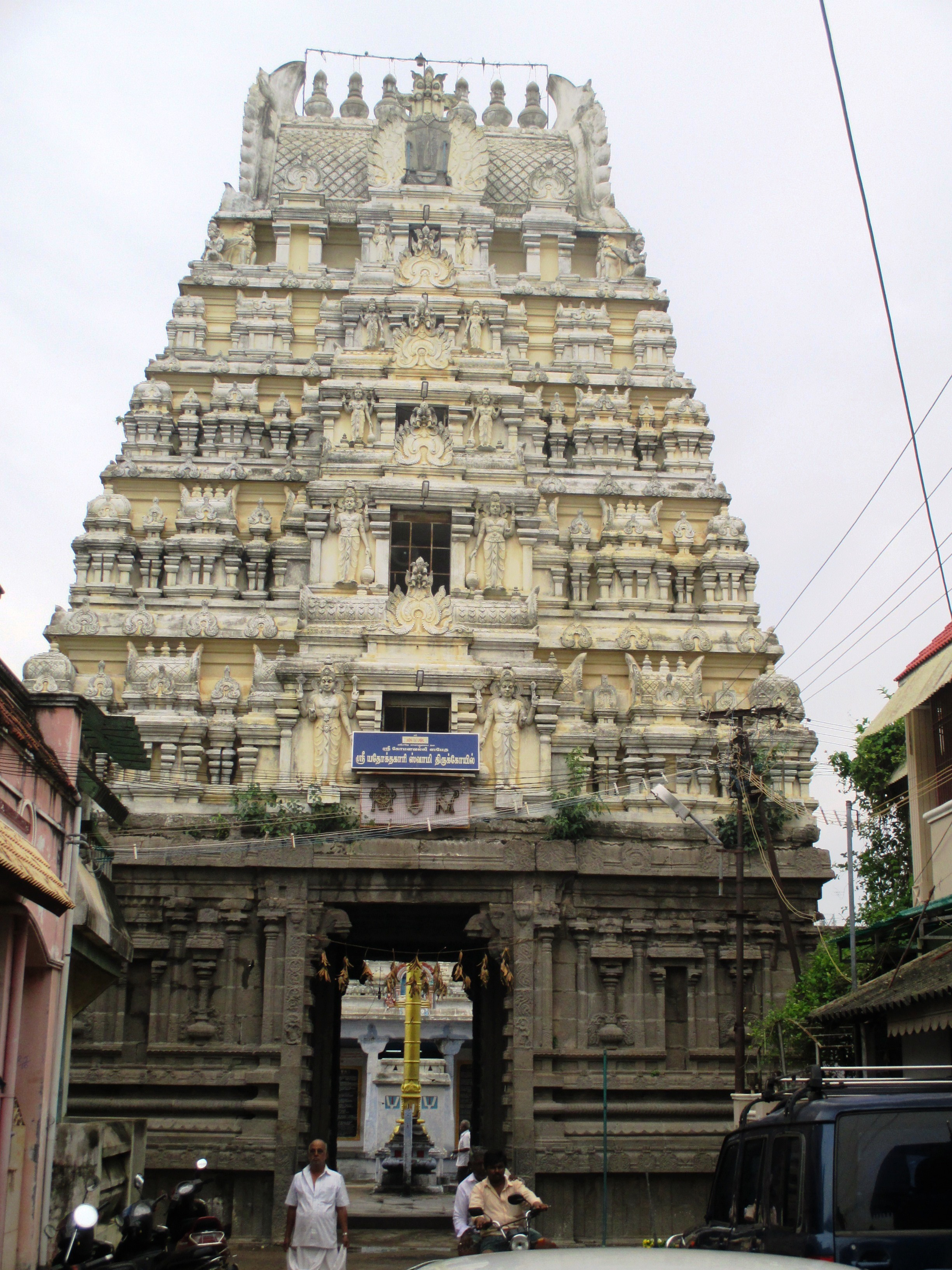
Yathothkari Perumal Temple, Kanchipuram

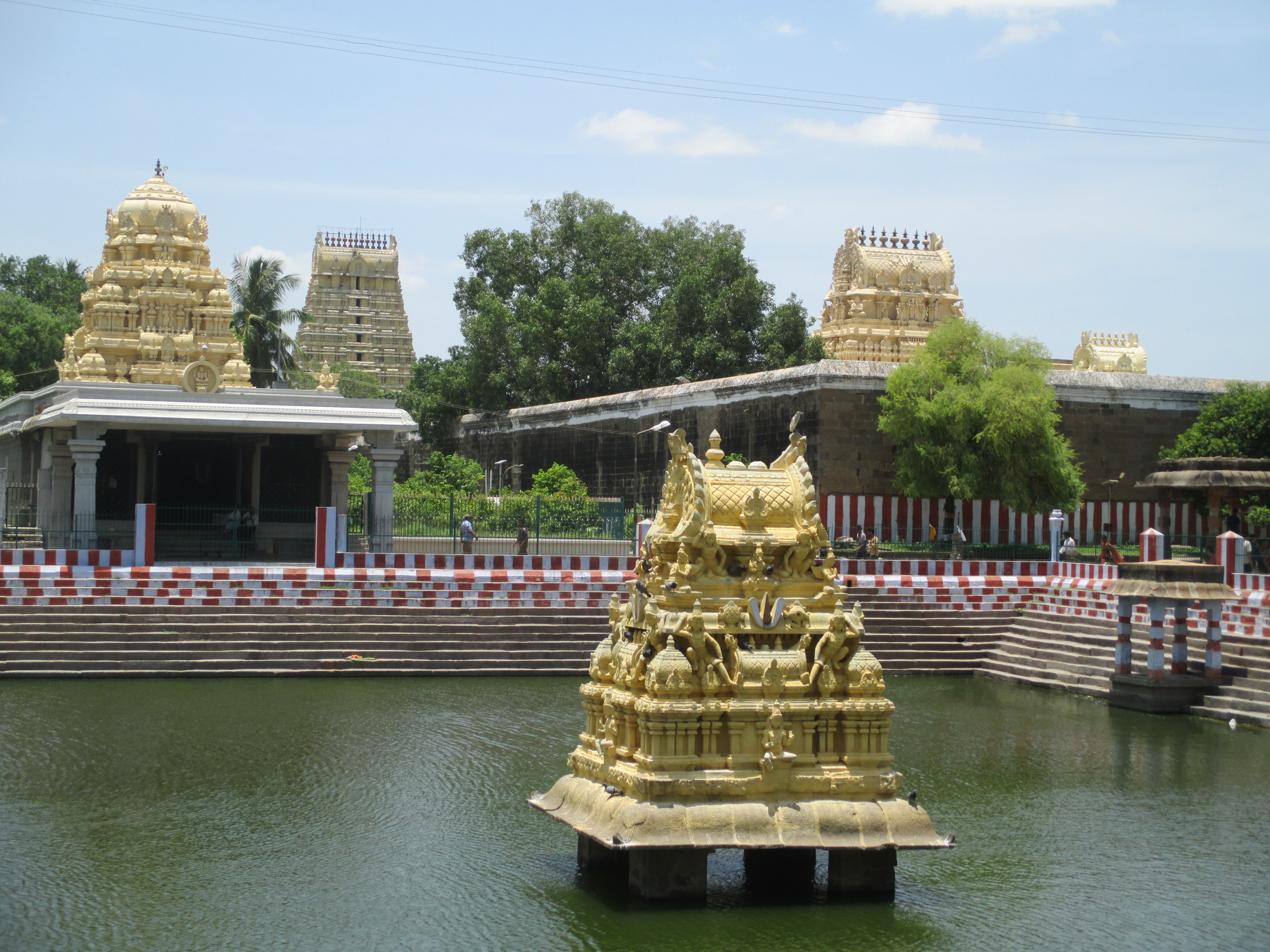
Varadharaja Perumal Temple, Kanchipuram

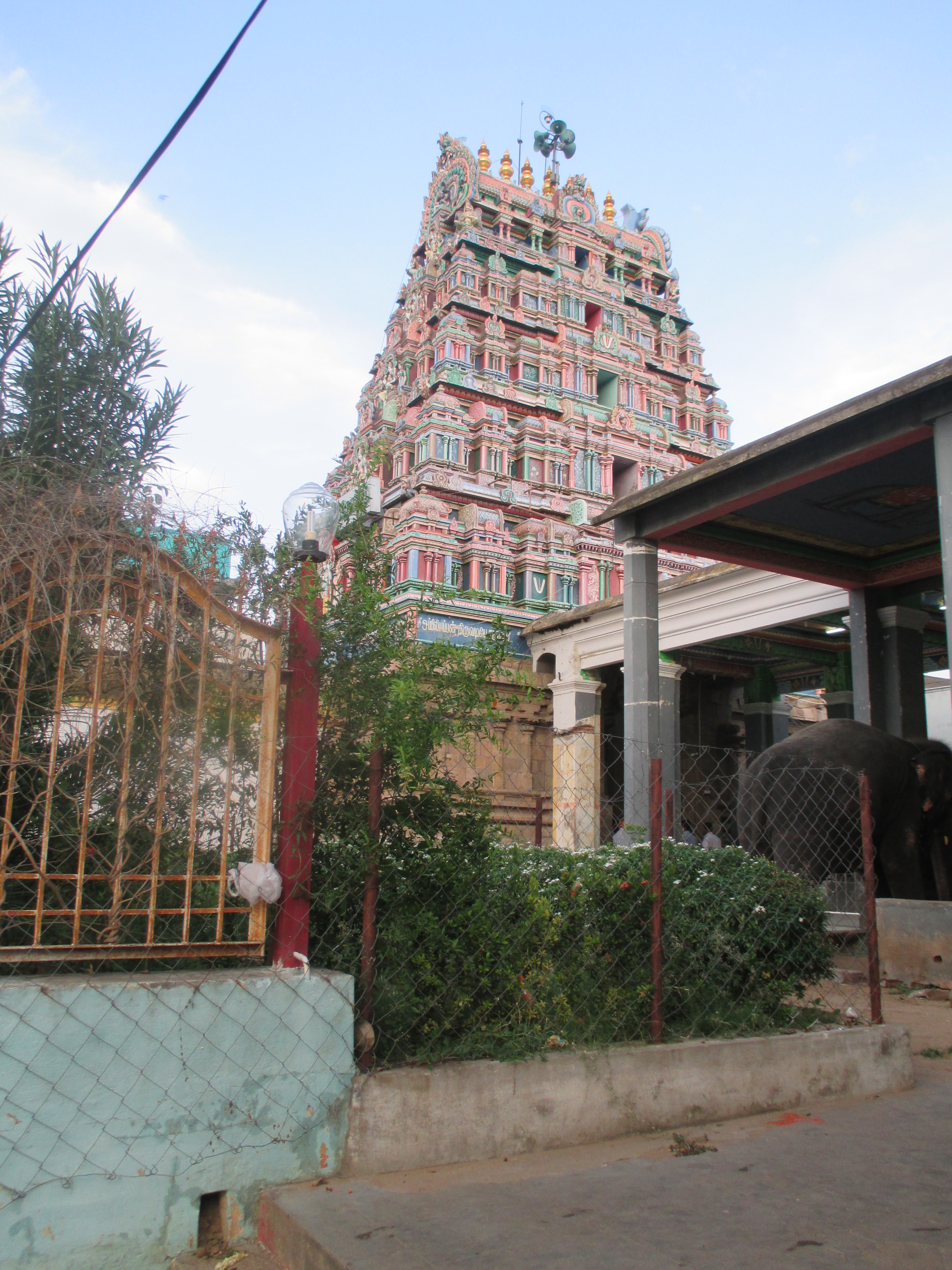
Oppiliappan temple

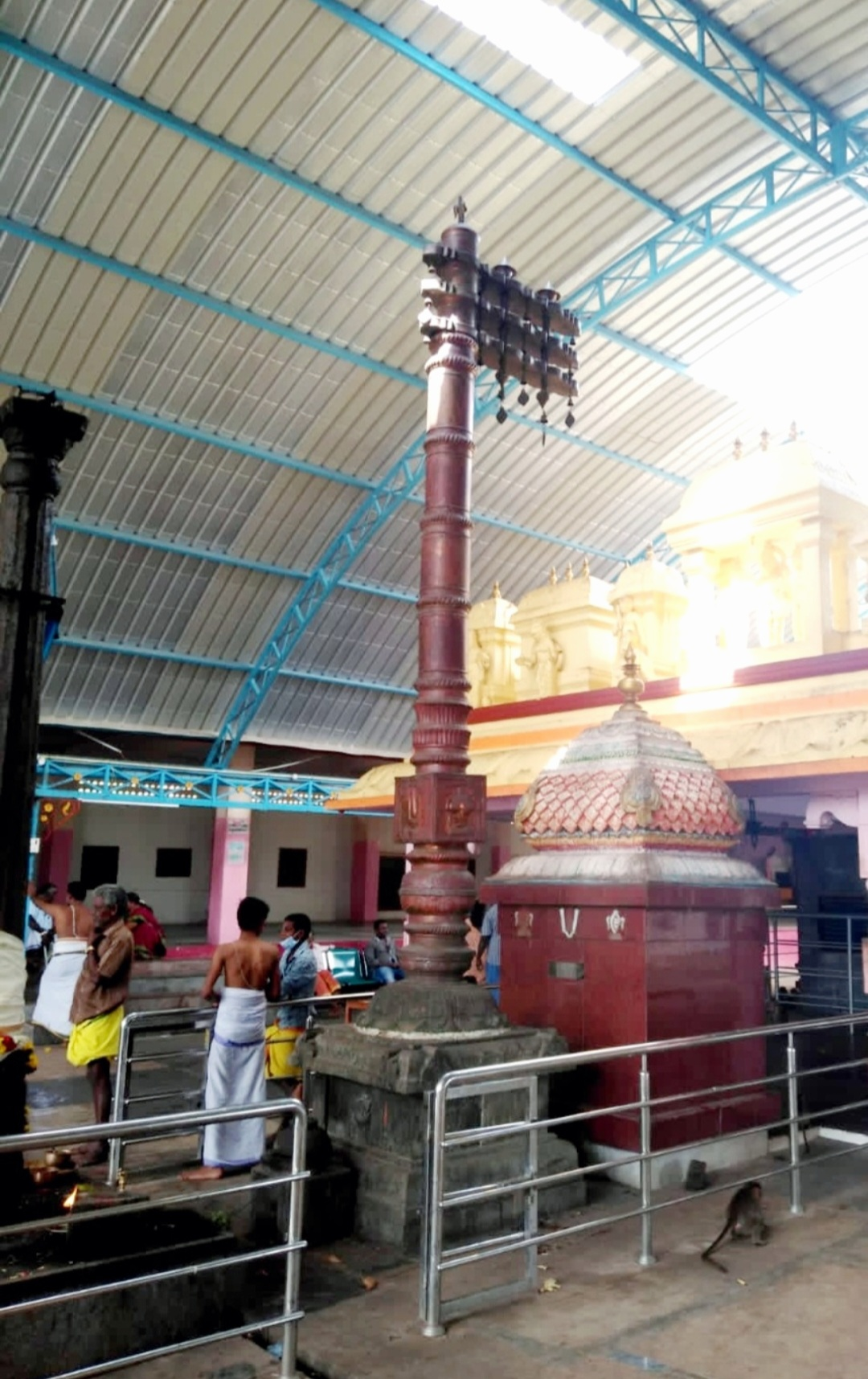
Adi Srinivasa perumal temple

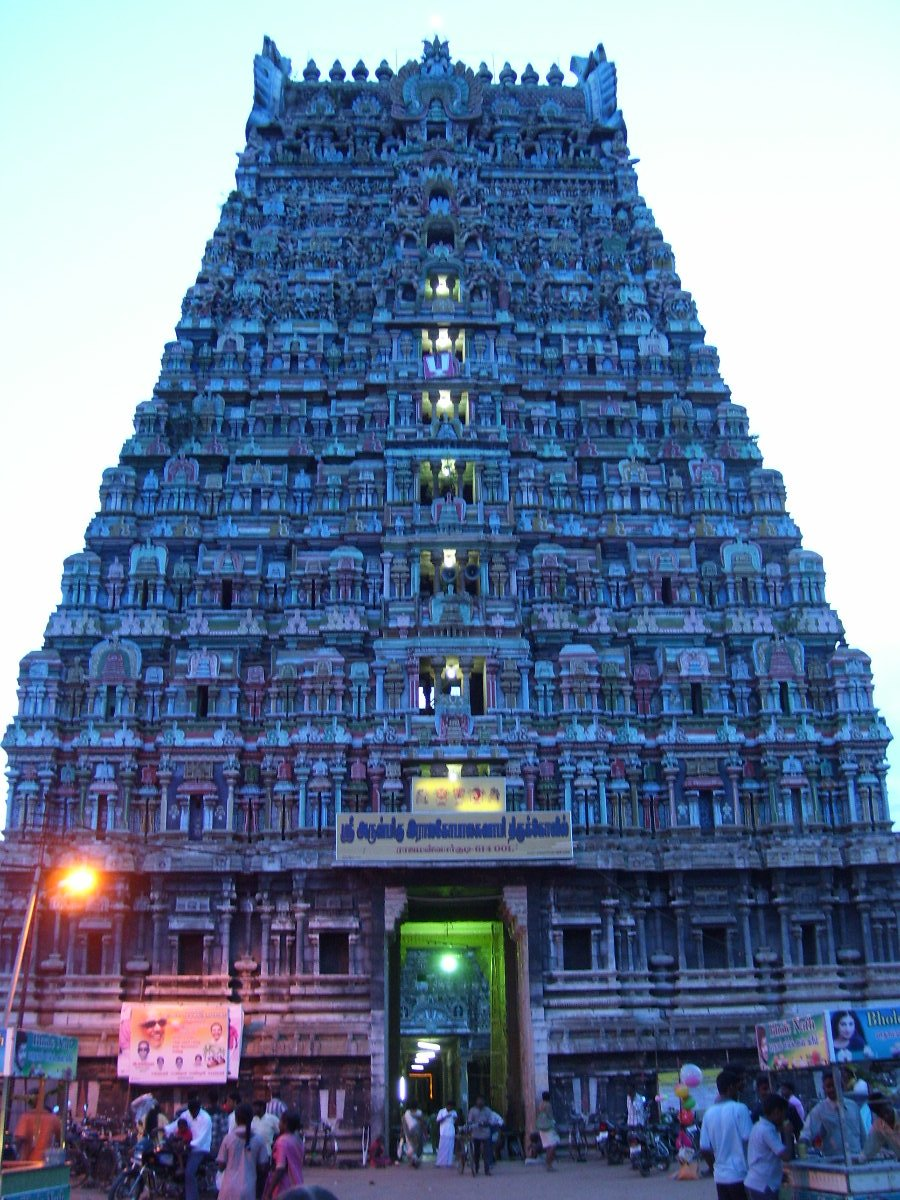
Rajagopalaswamy Temple, Mannargudi

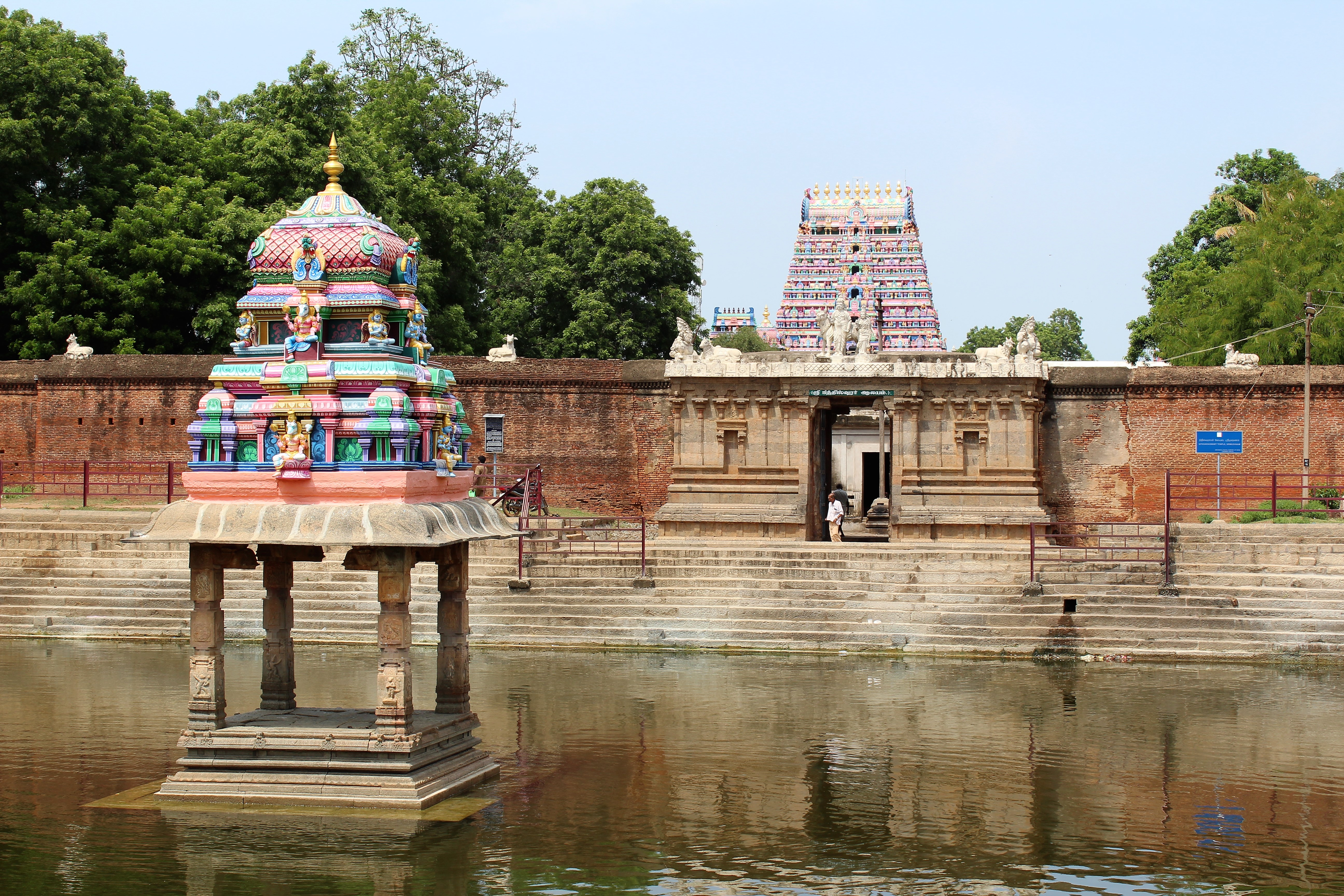
Bhu Varaha Swamy temple

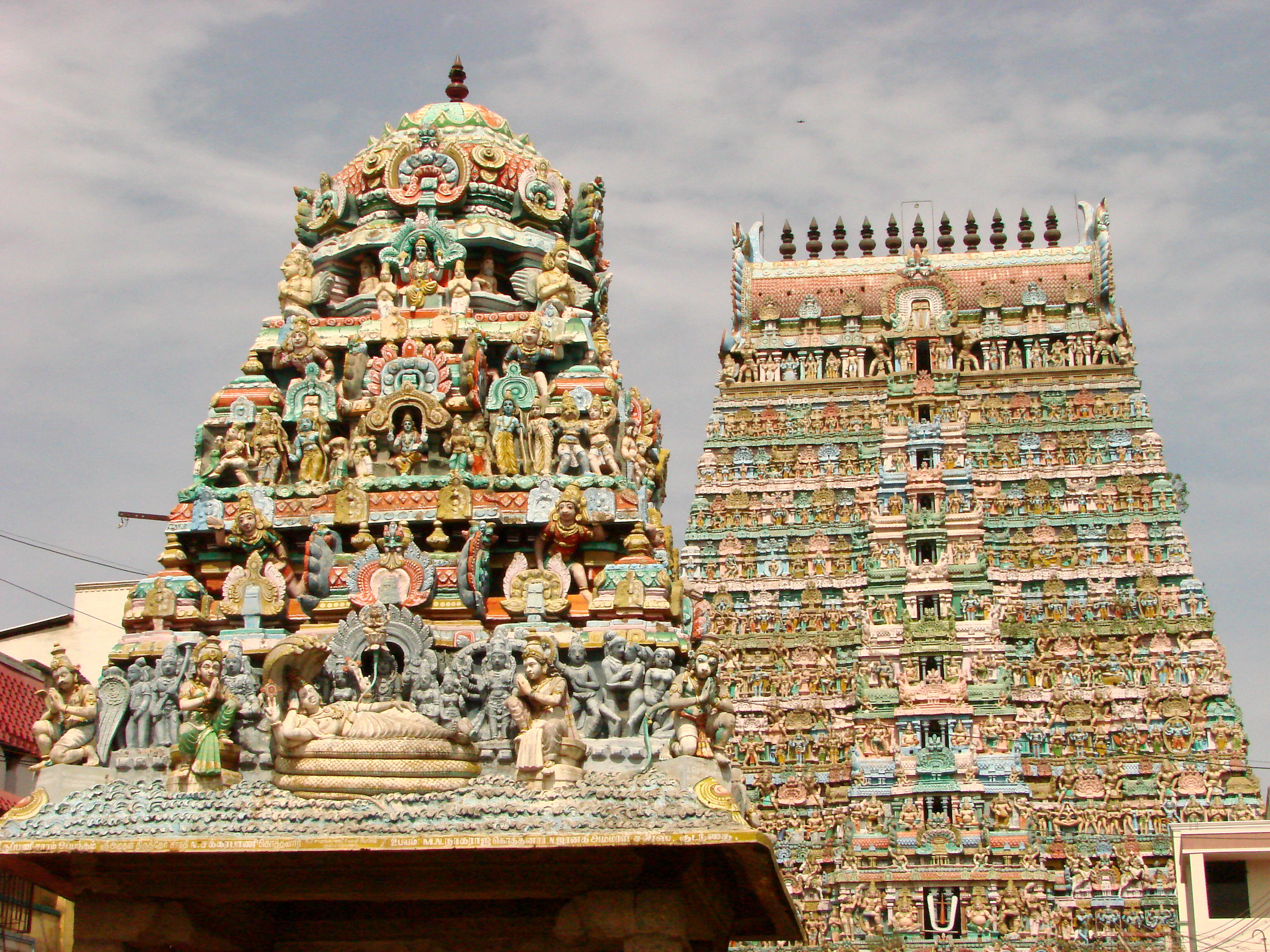
Sarangapani temple, Kumbakonam

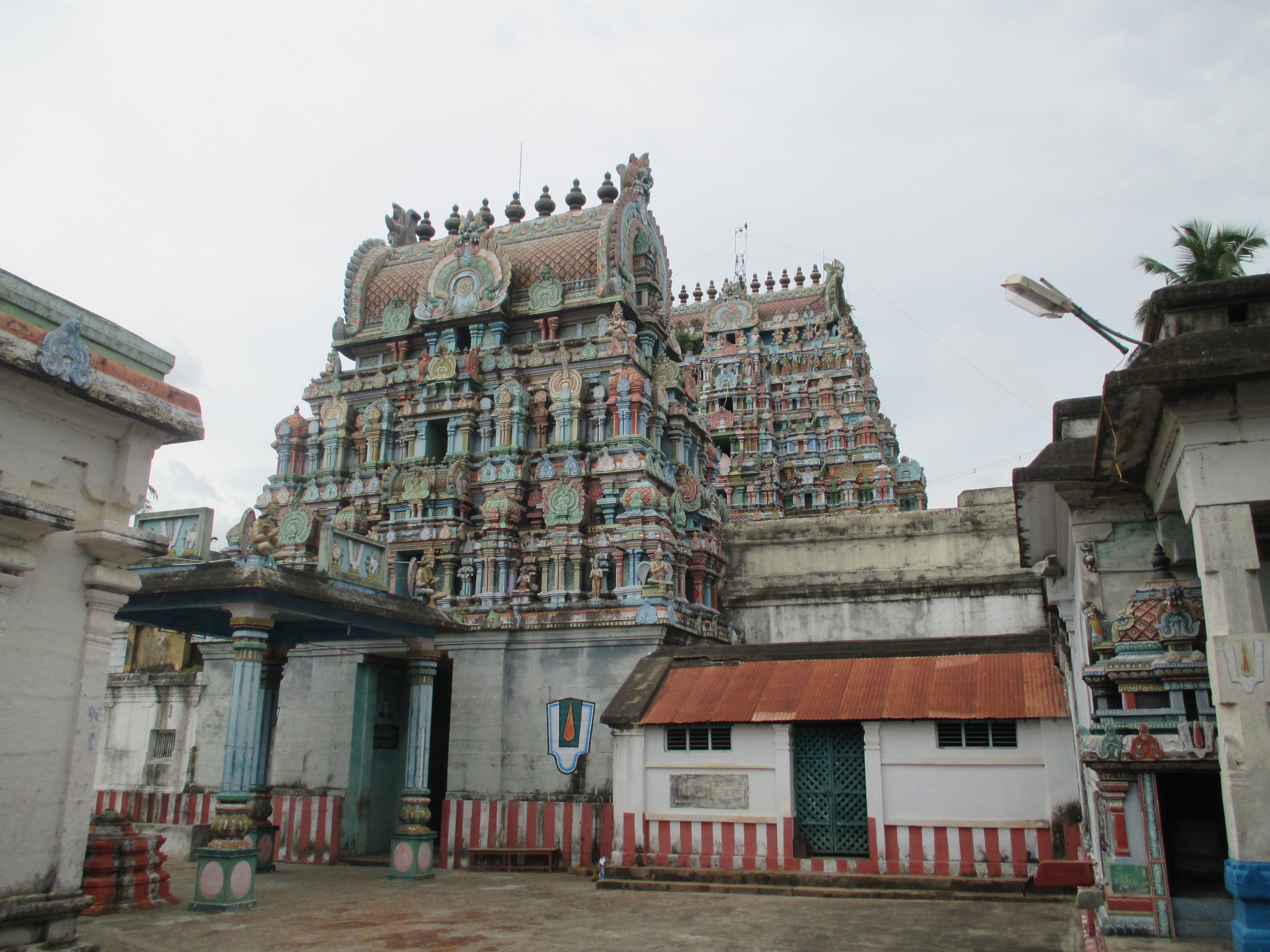
Neelamegha Perumal temple

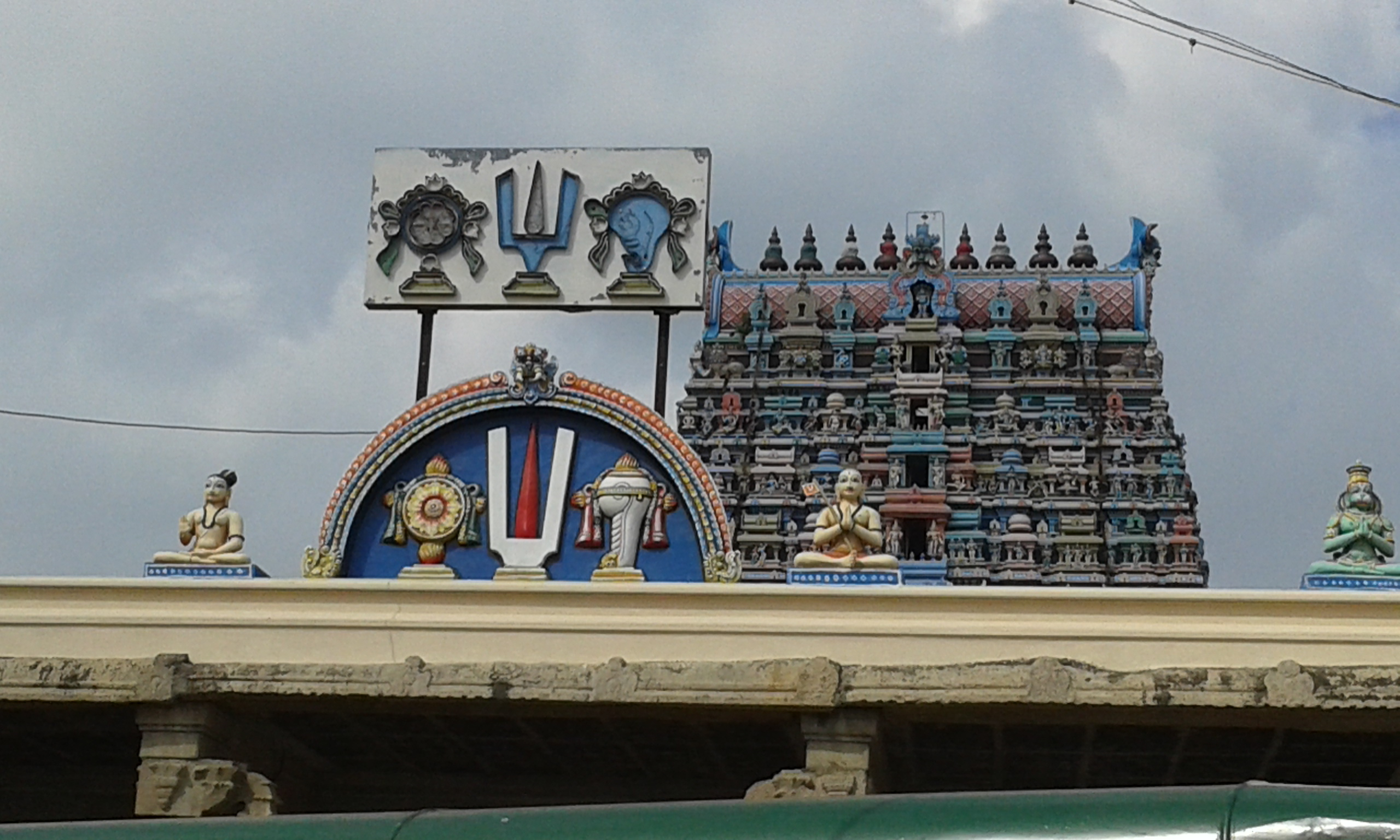
Srivaikuntanathan Perumal temple

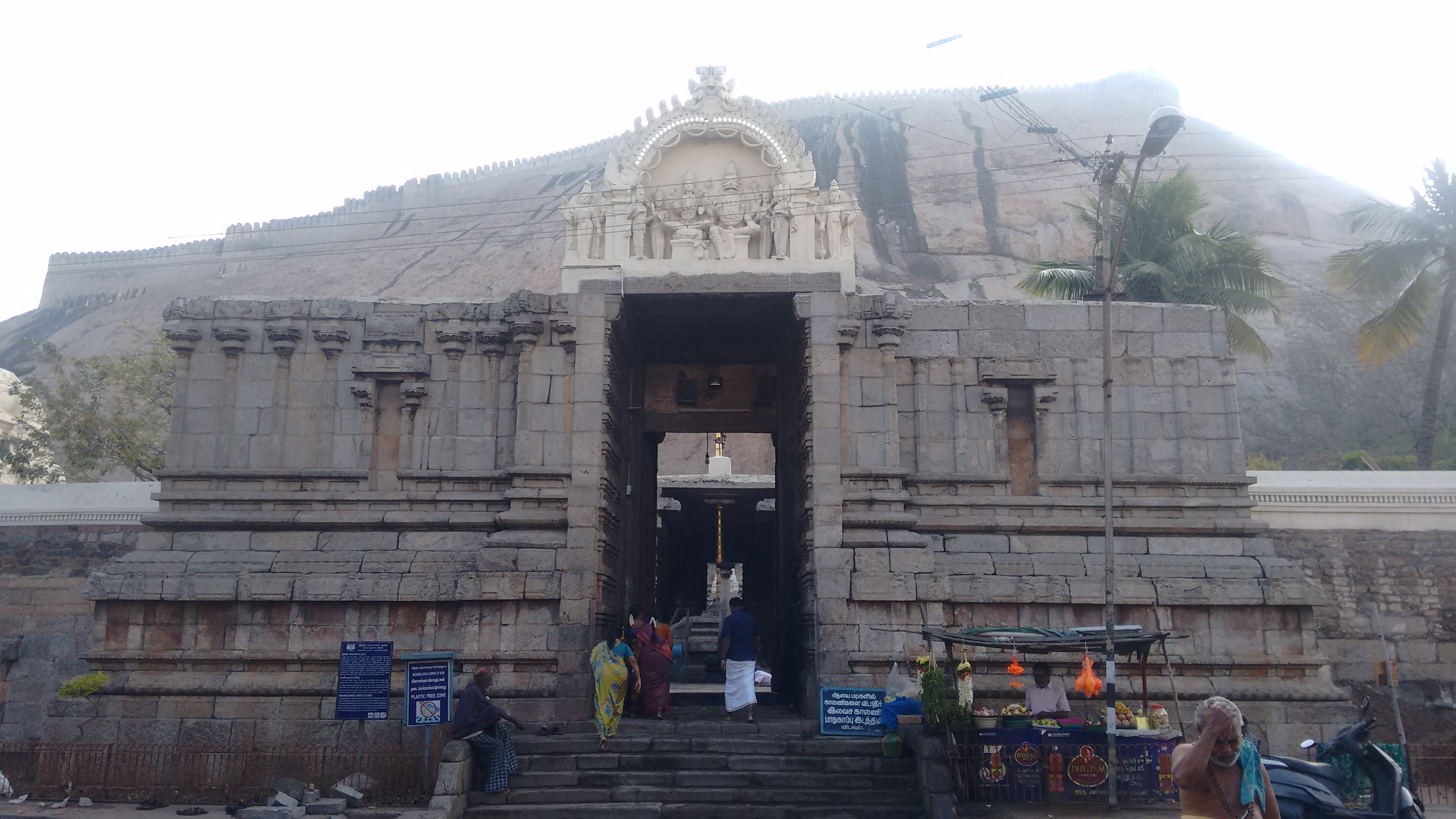
Narasimhaswamy Temple, Namakkal

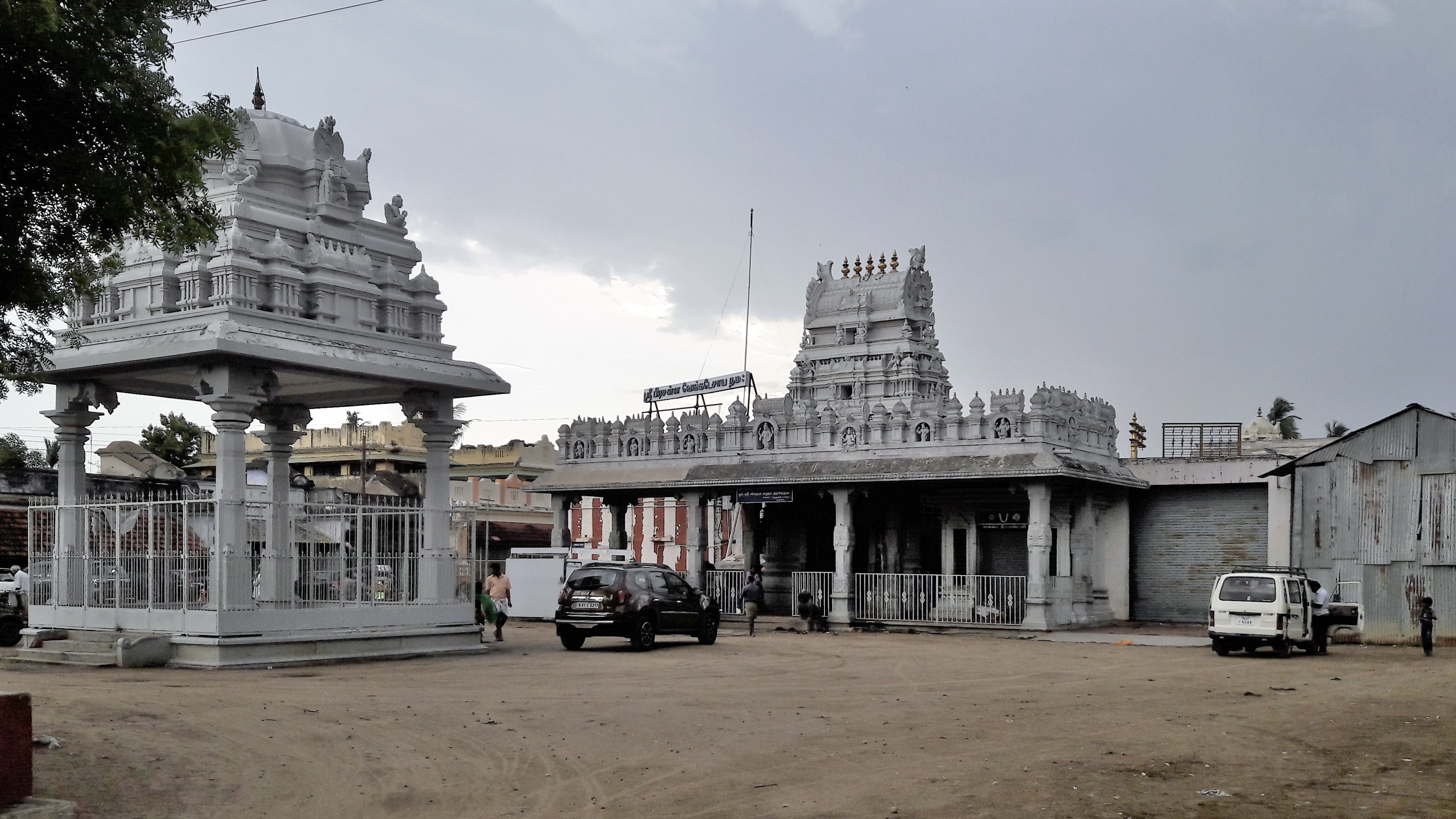
Gunaseelam Prasanna Venkatachalapathy Temple

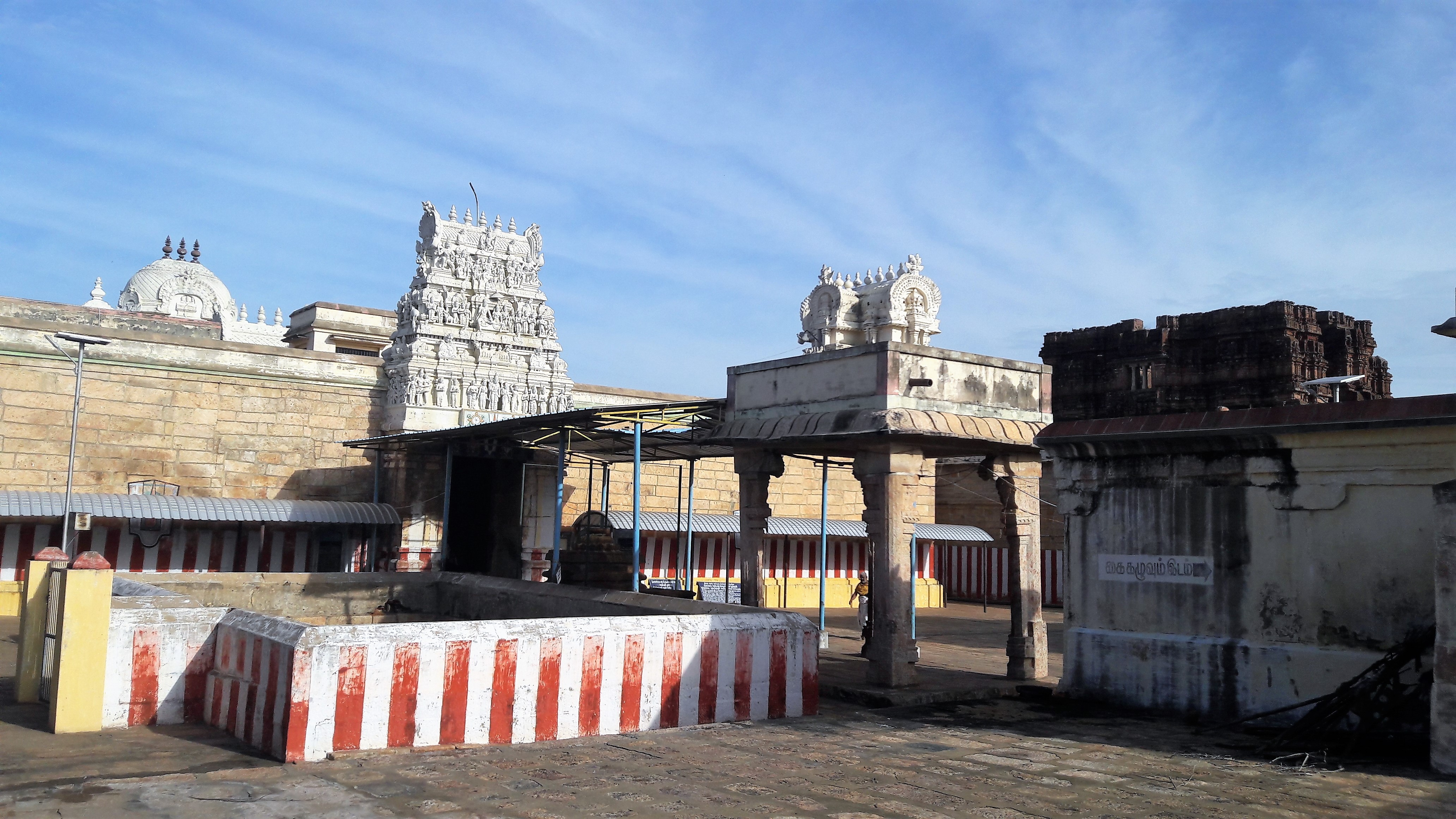
Pundarikakshan Perumal Temple

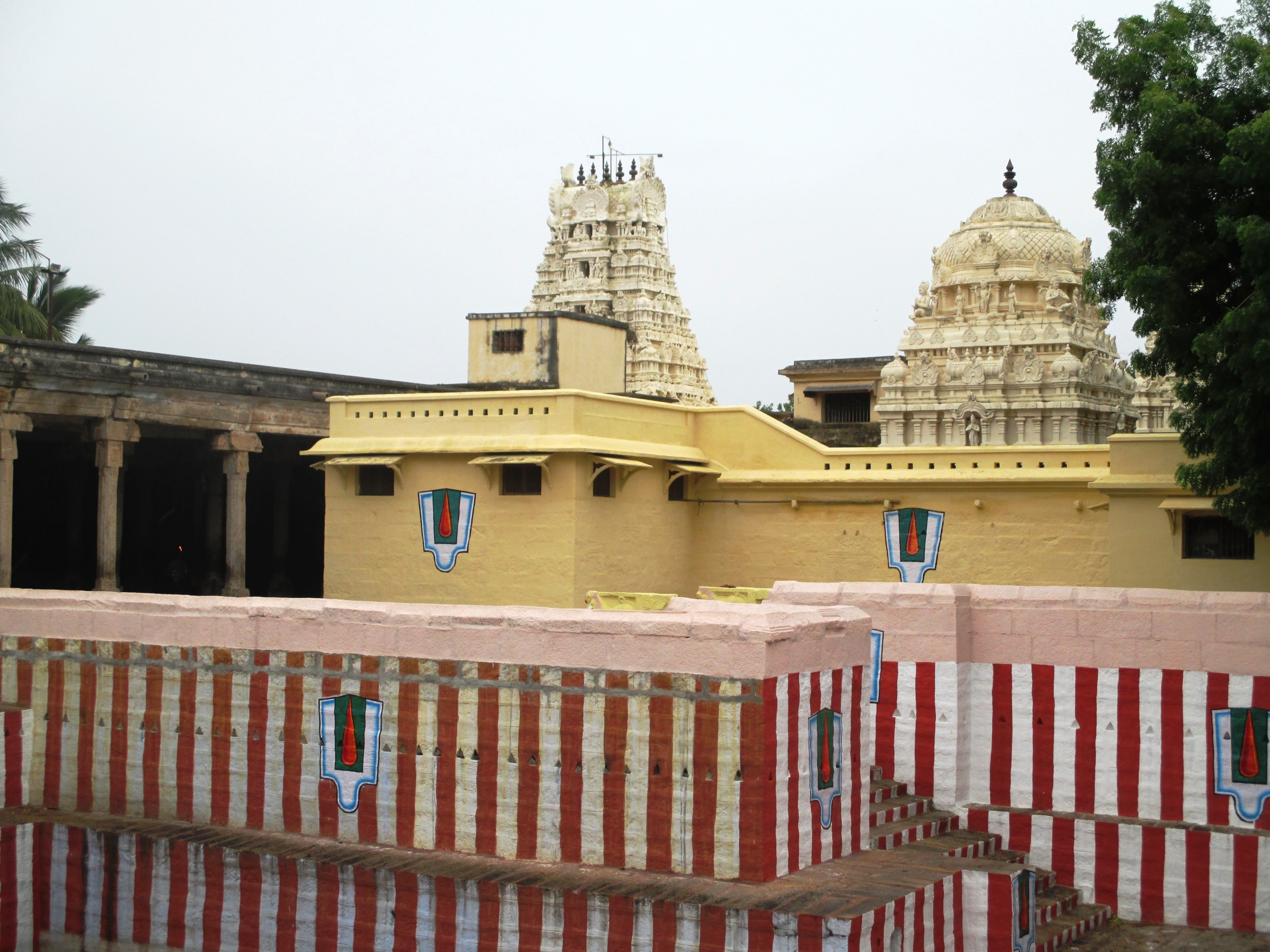
Azhagiya Manavala Perumal Temple

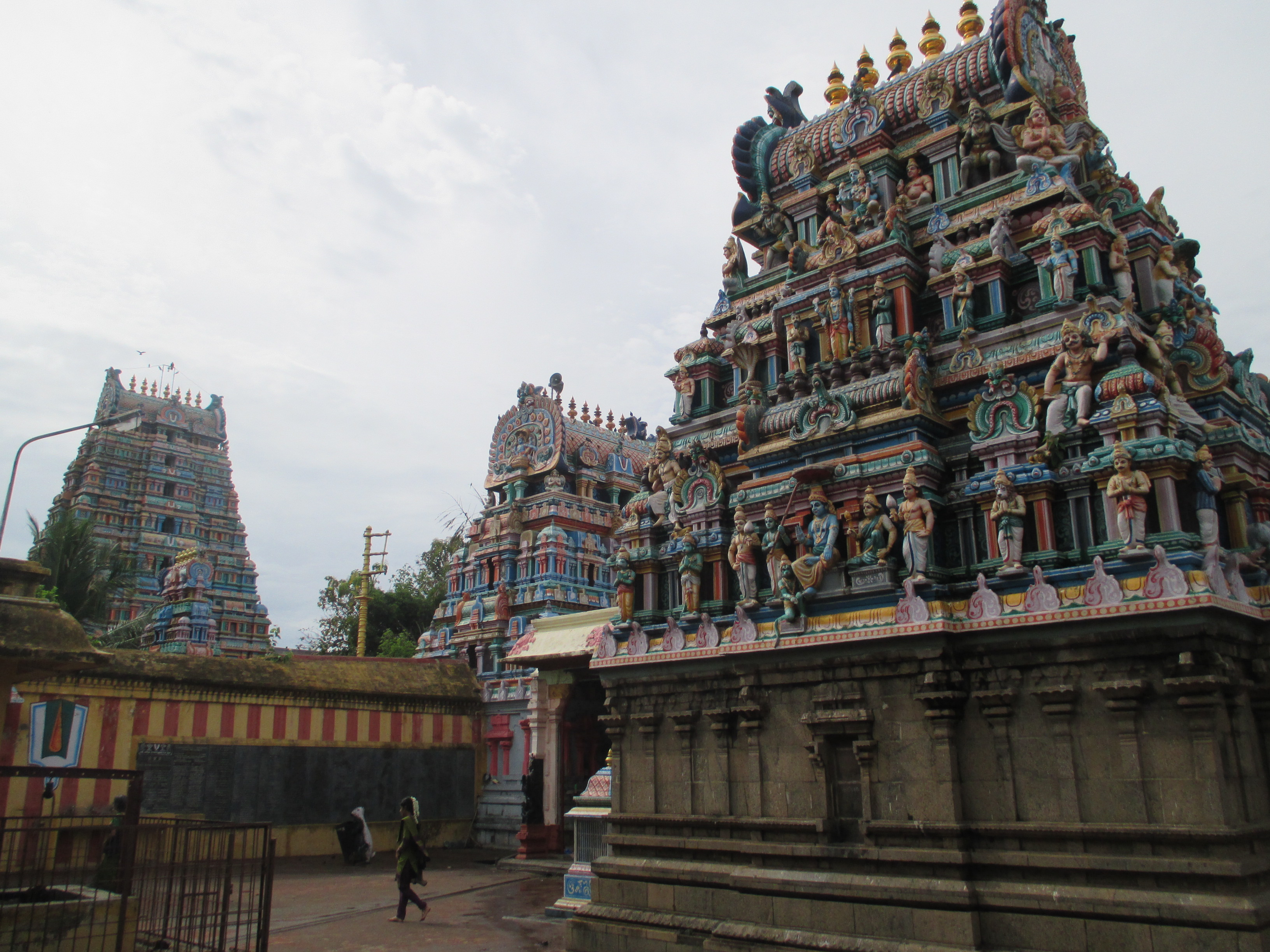
Soundararajaperumal temple, Nagapattinam

== Temples dedicated to Maha Vishnu ==
- Ranganathaswamy Temple, Srirangam
- Venkateswara Temple, Tirumala
- Andal Temple, Srivilliputtur
- Namagiri Thayar Sametha Narasimhaswamy perumal temple, Namakkal
- Sundararaja Perumal Temple, Salem
- Srivaikuntanathan Perumal temple
- Adikesava Perumal temple, Mylapore
- Koodal Azhagar temple
- Nachiyar Koil
- Sowmya Narayana Perumal temple
- Adi Srinivasa perumal temple
- Eri-Katha Ramar Temple
- Chakrapani Temple, Kumbakonam
- Sarangapani temple, Kumbakonam
- Ulagalantha Perumal Temple, Kanchipuram
- Parthasarathy Temple, Triplicane
- Bhu Varaha Swamy temple
- Varadharaja Perumal Temple, Kanchipuram
- Ashtabujakaram
- Adikesava Perumal Temple, Kanyakumari
- Pandava Thoothar Perumal Temple
- Rajagopalaswamy Temple, Mannargudi
- Ulagalantha Perumal Temple, Tirukoyilur
- Mudikondan Kothandaramar Temple
- Thirupullabhoothangudi Temple
- Kola Valvill Ramar Temple, Tiruvelliyangudi
- Vijayaraghava Perumal temple
- Ramaswamy Temple, Kumbakonam
