= Adi Srinivasa Perumal Temple =

Hindu temple in Tamil Nadu, India

Adi Srinivasa Perumal Kovil
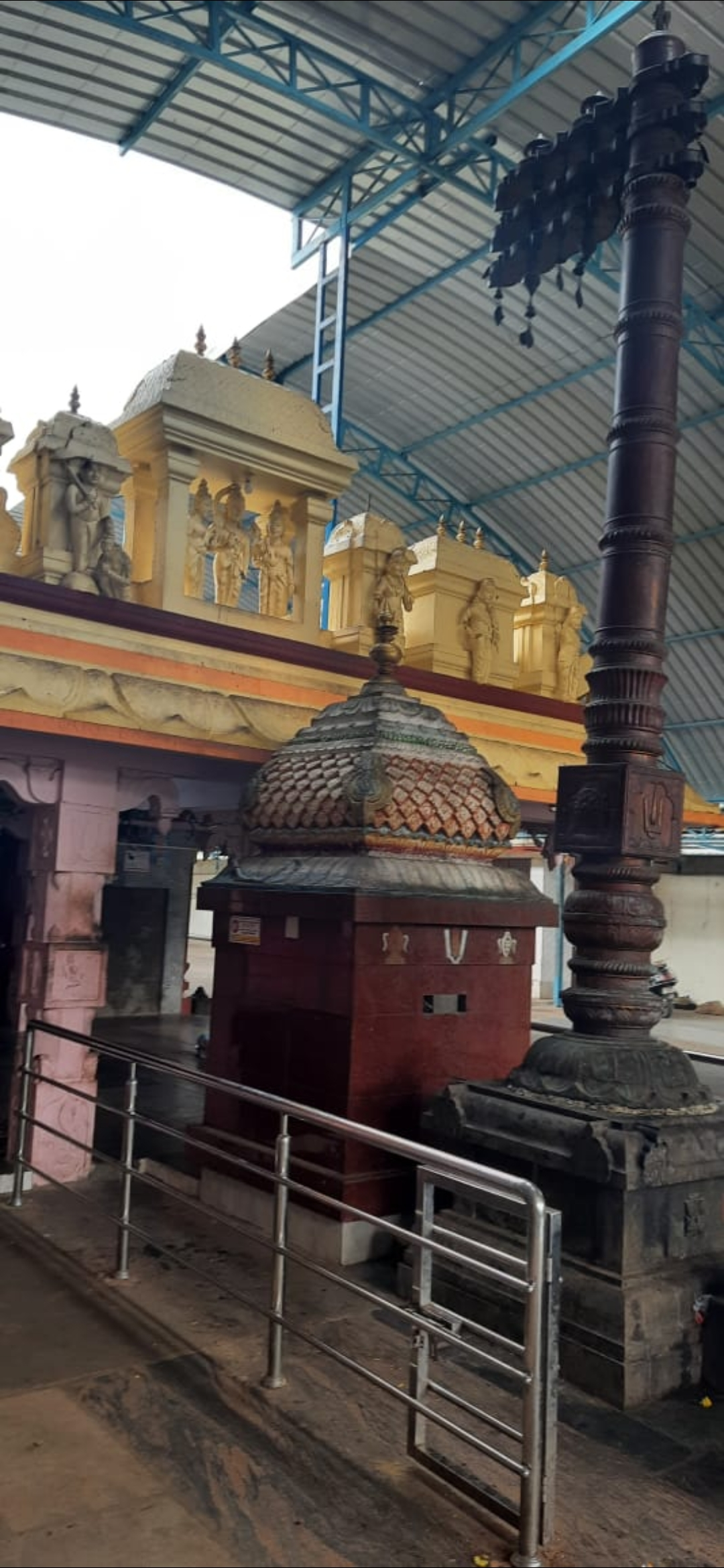
- Adi moola Srinivasa Perumal Temple

- Adimoola Venkatramanaswamy Temple, Mookanur, Dharmapuri district, Tamil Nadu

Religion
- Affiliation: Hinduism
- District: Dharmapuri district
- Deity: Adi Srinivasa Perumal (Vishnu), Padmavathi Thayar (Lakshmi)

Location
- Location: Mookanur
- State: Tamil Nadu
- Country: India
- Coordinates: 12.1386°N 78.2577°E

Architecture
- Type: Dravidian architecture
- Creator: Pallava dynasty
- Elevation: 517.59 m (1,698 ft)

Adi moola Srinivasa Perumal Temple or Adi moola Venkataramanaswamy Temple is a Hindu temple dedicated to Vishnu located in a village called Mookanur, in the Dharmapuri district, Tamil Nadu, India. Constructed in the Dravidian style of architecture, it is believed to have been built by the Pallava dynasty. It is considered one among the 108 Abhimana Kshethram of Vaishnavate tradition. The temple is Constructed in the foot hill of a mountain Dedicated entaierly to Vishnu. This structure was earlier maintained by Tenkalai Brahmins and now is maintained and administered by the Hindu Religious and Charitable Endowments Department, follows the Vaikhanasa agama and is a pure Vaishnavate temple. There is no Ganesha shrine inside the temple complex. The divine-deity is the Kula-devata of many Brahmins and Gounder's in the Dharmapuri district.

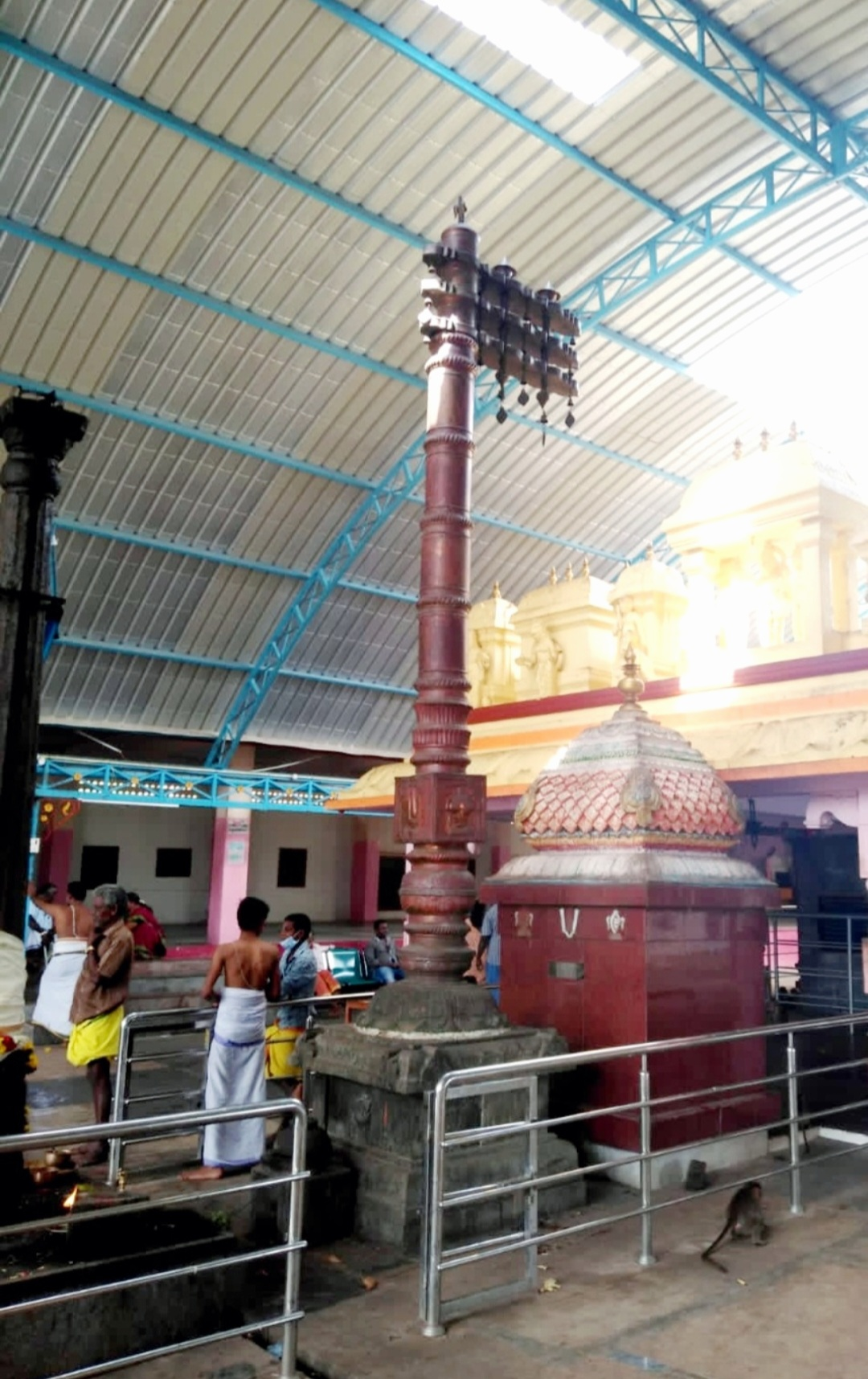
Kodimaram and Garudaazhwar Shrine

== Legend ==
The temple priests claim that this temple is older than Venkateswara Temple, Tirumala hence, called "Adi Srinivasa Perumal". The legend of the temple states that When Bhrigu visited Vaikuntha, Vishnu's abode, the deity was absorbed in meditation with his feet being attended to by his consort, the goddess Lakshmi. Feeling dishonoured by the lack of appropriate welcome, a furious Bhrigu kicked Vishnu on the chest. Vishnu stirred and apologised to the sage by massaging his feet. During this act, he squashed the extra eye that was present on the sole of Bhrigu's foot, which destroyed the sage's egotism. The sage, impressed by Vishnu's act, declared Vishnu to be the deity worthy of the dedication of the yajna. Lakshmi was outraged by the sage's misdemeanour and Vishnu's silence at the act, since she was spiritually associated with the chest of her consort. The goddess departed from Vaikuntha, arriving on Earth. After the departure of the goddess Lakshmi, Lord Vishnu was so sad and he also left Vaikuntha, he decieded to step his foot first on this Mountain, Where the temple is currently present. Till now a huge foot print can be seen on top of the hill. The temple priests show's a huge depression created on the mountain due to the pressure of Lord Vishnu as he was huge when he entered Earth from Vaikuntha.

there are 2 temples associated to the same mountain and The main temple on the top of the mountain with the footprint. People go trekking to visit the lord above the mountain

== History ==
The Temple has carvings and symbols similar to the Pallavas and Pandyas Architecture. as this region was Ruled by pallavas the temple must be built by the pallavas of the 8th century.

== Architecture ==
The temple has two Mandapa's one for maaraige and annadhanam and other for the Bhakthas to sit and worship. The Kalyanam cum annadhanamandapa was built around 1900s and the other mandapa was built probably by Vijayanagara Empire. the sanctoum sanctorum is believed to be built by Pallavas of 8th century and the temple on the hill is believed as Swayambu. There are two entrances for the temple . The main entrance faces is East and other one faces north. The Mula vighraha faces east and the mula vigraha present on the mountain faces north (Facing Thirupathi).

== Shrines ==
There are separate shrines for Perumal and Thayar. Perumal is not so tall and he showers his blessings with four arms. Padmavathi Thayar also has four hands. There is a belief that if a person chants Lalita Sahasranama front of the goddess, Devi will remove your obstacles and give what the person wishes in a short period of time. There are shrines for all the Alvars Poygai Alvar, Putattalvar, Peyalvar, Thirumalisai Alvar, Nammalvar, Kulasekhara Alvar, Periyalvar Thondaradippodi Alvar, ThiruPanalvar, Thirumangai Alvar, Madhurakavi, Andal and Acharyars such as Ramanuja and Nathamuni too. There is small shrine for Ganesha and Bhairava outside the temple.

== Festivals and religious practices ==
The temple priests perform the pooja (rituals) during festivals and on a daily basis. As at other Vishnu temples of Tamil Nadu, the priests belong to the Vaishnavaite community of the Tenkalai sect. There are weekly, monthly and fortnightly rituals performed in the temple. Abishekam takes place during Saturdays and many devotees donate cows or donate grains and rice by Tulabhara. The temple is visited by ver few people in the weekdays and high crowd on Saturdays.Lord Vishnu showers his blessing just like the Venkateshwara in Thirupathi.

== Significance ==
It is considered one among the 108 Abhimana Kshethram of Vaishnavate tradition. It is also believed that Bhrigu maharishi worshiped the lord here and Ramanuja had also visited this temple when he left from Chidambaram to Melkote. The foot print of Maha Vishnu can be seen till now and is considered so sacred that only people who did so many good deeds can have a darshan of his foot print. there is a pond on top of the mountain which is called vatra kulam meaning a pond which has never dried even at high temperatures.
