= Ancient Tamil music =

Music genre

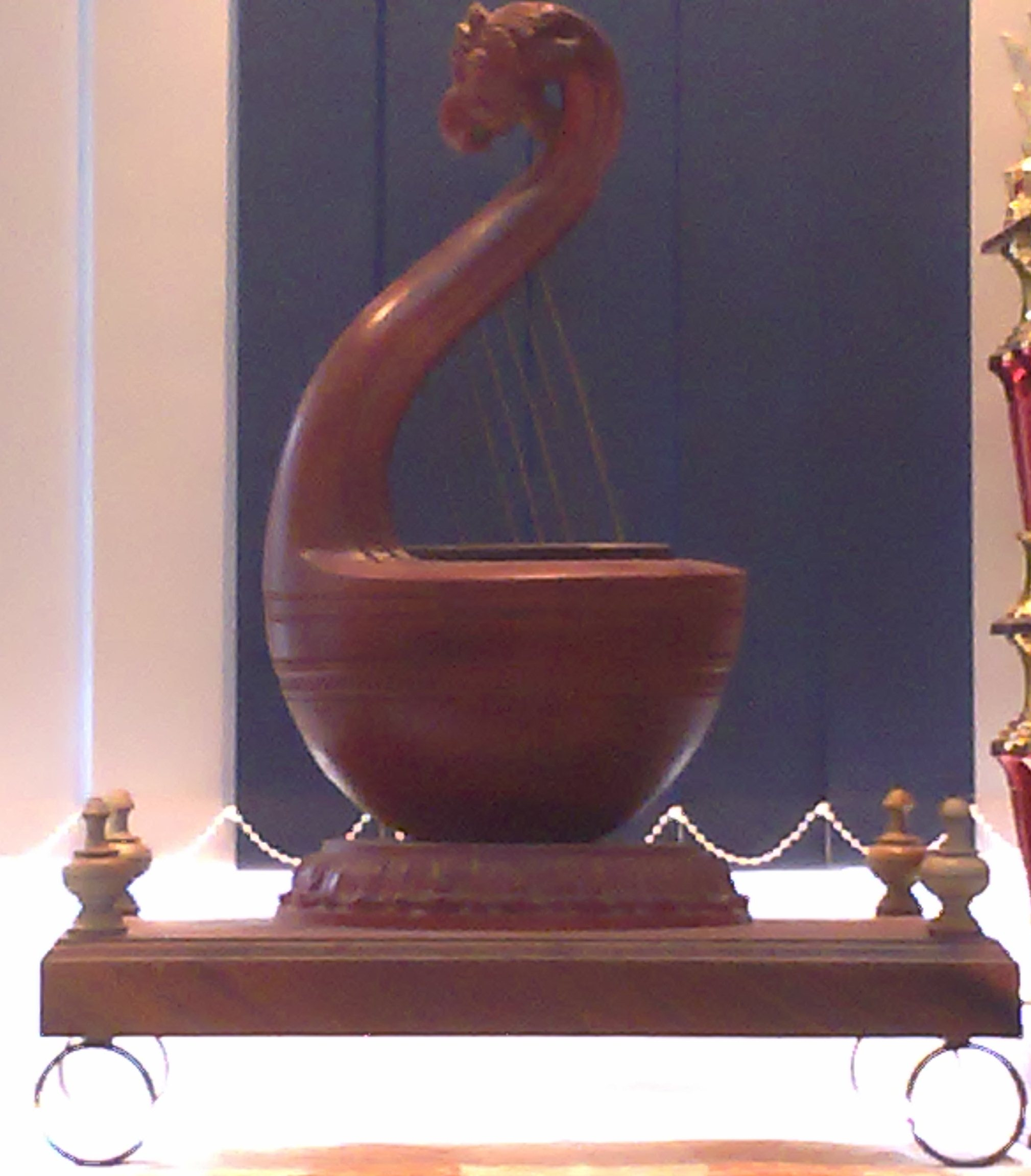
Yaazh, Ancient Tamil music instrument

The ancient Tamil music is the historical predecessor of the Carnatic music during the Sangam period spanning from 500 BCE to 200 CE.

Many poems of the classical Sangam literature were set to music. There are various references to this ancient musical tradition found in the ancient Sangam books such as Ettuthokai and Pattupattu. The early narrative poem Cilappatikaram, belonging to the post-Sangam period (5th or 6th century) also mentions various forms of music practiced by the Tamil people.

Music was an integral part of the compositions of the Tamil Saiva saints such as Appar, Siva Prakasar, Thirugnana Sambanthar and Manikkavasagar during the Hindu revival period between the 6th and the 10th century.

== Sangam music ==
The Sangam age grammatical work Tolkappiyam mentions the various music pertaining to the five landscapes (thinai) of the Sangam literature. The five landscapes are associated with a particular mood of the poem and to give colour to these moods, each had a musical mood (pann), a melodic instrument (yaazh) and a percussion instrument (parai). For example, the neithal thinai, which dealt with the incidents around the seashore and the theme of elopement, had the musical mood of sevvazhi, Vilari yaazh as the musical instrument and the navayapambai for the percussion. Tolkappiyam also mentions the musical form known as Paattu Vannam and various types of songs like Asiriapattu, Neduven pattu, Adivarai, Seer, Ahaval Osai and Vellosai, which are classified on the basis of the musical quality, metrical structure etc. Most of the Sangam age poetry used one or more of these meters in their compositions. Poems of the Ettuthohai anthology, such as the Natrinai, Paripaatal and Kaliththokai are extensively musical in nature and use various panns to create the mood.

=== Musical instruments ===
Poems of the Sangam literature contain numerous mentions of the various musical instruments such as the Seerkazhi, a stringed instrument of the Veena type and various percussion instruments such as murasu or muzham. Pattupaatu contains a description of the yazh, a stringed instrument. There were two types of yaazh, Periyaazh or the 'large yaazh' contained 21 strings, whereas its more compact companion Siriyaazh had only seven strings. Two other types of yaazhs, Makarayaazh with 19 strings and Sakottuyaazh with seven strings are also mentioned in Pattuppattu. However, we have no further information on their actual appearance, mode of playing and the kind of melody generated by these instruments.

The flute was the most popular wind instrument during the Sangam period. Perumpanarruppatai, one of the Pattupattu anthologies, describes the process of making the flute. The holes in the bamboo tube were bored using red-hot embers. The flute is also mentioned in the Kurincippattu as the instrument on which the shepherds played the ambal pann. Among the other wind instruments were the Pili, a small trumpet and Kanvidutumbu a larger flute), perhaps producing lower octaves. The flute also acted as a drone providing a constant pitch for vocalists and other instruments 'as long as the trunk of an elephant'.

The Murasu, or the drum was the most popular percussion instrument. During festivals, the sound of Murasu conveyed joy and gaiety. Muzhavu, another percussion instrument accompanied singers. The drum was also used as the war-drum, calling people to arms. Mathuraikkanci mentions that the murasu was one of the prized possessions captured from the defeated enemy in the battlefield. Malaipatukatam describes the method of constructing and tuning the murasu. The sides were covered with skin, which were kept in position by leather straps. Malaipatukatam also mentions other percussion instruments such as udukkai, a palm-sized drum, Muzhavu, Siruparai and Tattai. The sound tattai resembled the croaking of a frog. This was a crude folk instrument made using a bamboo stick. Numerous slits were made across the stick and sound was produced on it by striking it on a stone or any other hard surface. In the Kurincippattu peasant women use tattai to scare the birds from the paddy field. A well-known percussion instrument is the mridangam (mathangam). It's a double headed drum used to accompany the veena (Yaazh) and the flute among other instruments.

List of Musical instruments used by ancient Tamil people was listed in Tirumurai dated between 6th and 11th century CE and include Akuli, Idakkai, Ilayam, Udukkai, Yezhil, Kathirikkai, Kandai, Karathalam, Kallalaku, Kalavadam, Kavil, Kazhal, Kalam, Kinai, Kinkini, Kilai, Kinnaram, Kudamuzha, Kuzhal, Kaiyalaku, Kokkarai, Kodukotti, Kottu, Kombu, Sangu, Sachari, Sanchalam, Salari, Siranthai, Silambu, Sinam, Thagunicham, Thakai, Thadari, Thattazhi, Thathalagam, Thandu, Thannumai, Thamarugam, Thaarai, Thaalam, Thuthiri, Thunthubi, Thudi, Thuriyam, Thimilai, Thondagam, Naral Surisangu, Padagam, Padutham, Panilam, Pambai, Palliyam, Parandai, Parai, Paani, Paandil, Pidavam, Perigai, Mathalam, Mani, Maruvam, Murasu, Muravam, Murugiyam, Murudu, Muzhavu, Monthai, Yaazl, Vangiyam, Vattanai, Vayir, Veenai, Veelai, and Venkural.

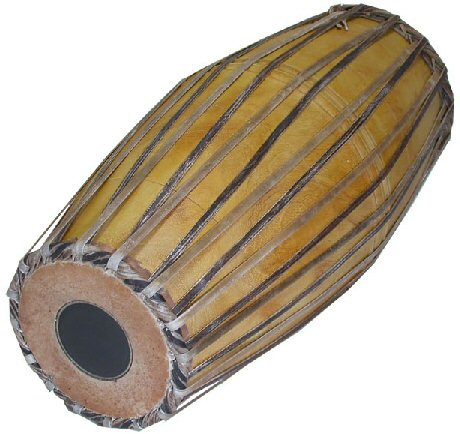
Thannumai

=== Musical notations ===
In Tamil music, the sargam "sa-ri-ga-ma-pa-da-ni" of the Indian classical music were known by their Tamil names Kural (குரல்), Tuttam (துத்தம்), Kaikilai (கைக்கிளை), Uzhai (உழை), Ili (இளை), Vilari (விளரி) and Taram (தாரம்). There are notations for the notes in different octaves. For example, Kurai Tuttam and Nirai Tuttam refer to the ri (rishabha) note in the lower and upper octaves respectively.

=== Moods ===
Raga, which defines the mood of the Indian classical music was described by the Pann. Specific panns were sung during worship and during religious and royal ceremonies. Maduraikanchi refers to women singing Sevvazhi pann to invoke the mercy of God during childbirth. In Tolkappiyam, the five landscapes of the Sangam literature had an associated Pann, each describing the mood of the song associated with that landscape.

The Sangam landscape was classified into five regions to describe the mood of the poem and to describe the intangibles of human emotions. While describing life and romance, the poets employed the background of the natural landscape and used the pann specific to that landscape to provide the mood. The neithal landscape, which is employed to convey the grief of separation of lovers had the associated sevvazhi pann expressing pathos.

== Post-Sangam music ==
"The south Indian music system, which was indeed Tamil Pannisai, was erroneously named, for the first time, Karnataka sangeetham in the 12th century by a western-Chalukya king, Someswara Bhuloka Mamalla, in his ‘Manasoullasam', a monumental work that dealt with all the subjects under the sun, including music. In no other language in India, there existed at that time Sahityas (musical compositions) as they did in Tamil. Though most of the music manuals written from the 9th century onwards were in Sanskrit, the source materials for them — like the varieties of ‘ragas' ( pann) they had mentioned in their works — were all associated with the Tamil literary works, like ‘Silappadikaram', ‘Thevaram', and ‘Nalayira Divya Prabhandam'.."

— Tamil scholar, Mu. Arunachalam in his book Tamizh Isai Ilakkiya Varalaaru

=== Evolution of panns ===
The post-Sangam period, between the third and the fifth centuries CE, Tamil music evolved to a different level of sophistication. Cilappatikaram, written around the fifth century CE, describes music based on logical, systematic and scientific calculations in the arrangements of the dancers on the stage to represent the notes and panns. Cilappatikaram contains several chapters dedicated to music and dance, of which the most famous is the kanal vari which is a duet between the hero Kovalan and his lady-love Madavi. Cilappatikaram contains musical terminology such as, azhaku and matthirai referring to the musical pitch and the smallest fraction of an audible sound distinguishable by the human ear. From these evolved the scales. One of the first scales employed by the ancient Tamils was the mullaippann, a pentatonic scale composed of the notes sa ri ga pa da equivalent to C, D, E, G and A in the western notations. These fully harmonic scales, constitutes the raga Mohanam in the Carnatic music style. These scales can also be found in many eastern music systems such as the Chinese traditional music.

Mullaippann further evolved into Sempaalai, a scale based on seven notes. The ancient Tamils also derived new panns by the process of modal shift of tonic and by the process of reallocating the pitch and beat of the notes. Cilappatikaram has an example of this in the chapter Arangetrukadai, where the Pann Mercharupalai is changed to derive a new Pann. The four original panns of maruthappann, kurinchippann, sevvazhi and sadari thus evolved into 103 panns with varying characterisations. Some of the panns and their equivalent Carnatic ragas were:

- Panchamam – Ahiri
- Pazham Panchuram – Sankarabharanam
- Meharahkkurinchi – Neelampari
- Pazhanthakka Ragam – Arabhi
- Kurinchi – Malahari
- Natta Ragam – Panthuvarali
- Inthalam – Nathanamakriya
- Thakkesi – Kambhoji
- Kausikam – Bhairavi
- Nattappadai – Gambheeranaattai

=== Tamil Modal System ===
The Important Modes of Tamil Music are grouped as Seven Great Modes (Ezh Perum Paalai). From them, 2 Modes are removed and remaining 5 are employed in Tolkappiam, there they are mentioned as Yaazh instead of Paalai or Pann which is meant to denote Musical Scale or Raaga. Also the 5 Small Modes of Tamil are derived from those 5 Great Modes. All of them are listed below, along with their Western and Carnatic equivalents :- (This doesn't mean that these Systems predate Tamil Music System.).

Tamil Modal system
7 Great Modes / Heptatonics	5 Tinai Tolkappiam Yāḻ	Eq. Carnatic Raga	7 Western Modes	Western Scales	5 Small Modes / Pentatonics Yāḻiṉ pakuti	Eq. Carnatic Raga	Eq. Western Scales
SemPaalai	Mullai	Harikambodhi	Mixolydian		MullaitheemPaaNi	Mohanam	Major Pentatonic
PadumalaipPaalai	Kurinji	Natabairavi	Aeolian	Minor Scale	Sendhurutti	Madhyamavati	Egyptian_Suspended
SevvazhipPaalai	---	Todi with 2 Ma	Locrian		---	---	---
ArumPaalai	Paalai	Sankarabaranam	Ionian	Major Scale	Konrai	Suddha Saveri	Blues Major
KOdipPaalai	Marudham	Karaharapriya	Dorian		Aambal	Suddha Dhanyasi	Minor Pentatonic
ViLaripPaalai	Neidhal	Todi	Phrygian		Indhalam	Hindolam	Blues Minor
MerchemPaalai	---	Kalyani	Lydian		---	---	---

(Note:- Yāḻ denotes a 7-Note Heptatonic Scale and Yāḻiṉ pakuti denotes a 5-Note Pentatonic Scale)

The 7 Mode Set is self generative, with the 1st Mode, if we apply a method called Kural Thiribu or PannupPeyarttal (which is Tonic Shift, or Rotation), we will get the rest of 6 Modes. The Last mode will yield back the 1st Mode, its Cyclic in same order. Same applies for the 5 Pentatonic Scale set, too. The English Term 'Tonic Shift' is 1st coined by one Mr. VPK sundaram who was an important Tamil-Music Theorist and author of several Books and Articles in this topic. He coined the term in his book, Pancha Marabu, in 1991(Page 3).

=== Musical instruments ===
Cilappatikaram makes reference to five types of instruments: Tolkaruvi (lit. 'skin instruments' = percussion), Tulaikaruvi (lit. 'holed instruments' = wind instruments), Narambukaruvi (stringed instruments), Midatrukaruvi (vocalists) and Kanchakaruvi (gongs and cymbals). The flute and the yaazh were the most popular instruments, while there were numerous kinds of percussion instruments suited for various occasions. Cilappatikaram also contains detailed instructions on the art of tuning and playing the yaazh.

== Devotional period ==
Between the fifth and the sixth centuries the Tamil literature was dominated by a moralistic age during which a number of literary works of didactic nature were produced. These poets did not attach much importance to music in their compositions, being more concerned with ethics and morals of the people. However the underlying musical culture was not forgotten. For example, Tirukkural contains numerous allusions to music and the enjoyment of music. One famous example is the kural compares unfavourably the sweetness of the flute and the yaazh with the voice of children.

=== Tevaram ===
Tamil music revived with the advent of the Saiva and Vaishnava saints who composed thousands of hymns in popular language to spread their faith among common people. Saivite nayanmars such as Appar, Thirugnana Sambanthar and Sundarar used the ancient panns to enable people to sing them in Temples. The Saiva Tevarams and the Vaishna Naalayira Divyap Prabhandhams were instrumental in the revival and the popularisation of Tamil music. In addition to the panns for the melody, the Tevaram poems used santham (rhythm) such as thaana-thana-thaanaa-thanaa in their lyrics, providing a complete musical experience to the listener.

The traditional of religious singing continued for many centuries during which singers known as Othuvars sang the Tevaram songs in temples. The musical knowledge and skills were orally passed on through generations.

Thiruppugazh - Umbartharu

=== Thiruppugazh ===
In the fifteenth century poet Arunagirinathar composed a series of poems known as Thiruppugazh. Arunagirinathar represents a remarkable blend of Tamil literary genius, a high degree of devotion to Murugan and a musical expertise. Arunagirinathar was one of the first poet to set all his compositions to reverberating music in the style of "Santham" which means setting the verses within a certain length to conform with rhythm (thala). Arunagirinathar was the pioneer in the art of setting his poems to the sweet sounds of music. Just like the seven octaves in music, Arunagirinathar, is known as a santhakkavi – musical poet, uses certain repetitive phrases rhythmically to achieve movement and colour in his poems. By combining the Tamil hard or soft consonants and long or short vowels in different ways, Arunagirinathar produces hundreds of compound rhythmic words such as, tatta, taatta, tantha, thaantha, thaiya, thanna, thaana, thanana, etc. At the beginning of each poem in the Thiruppugazh, Arunagirinathar gives the rhythm notations.

== Gallery ==
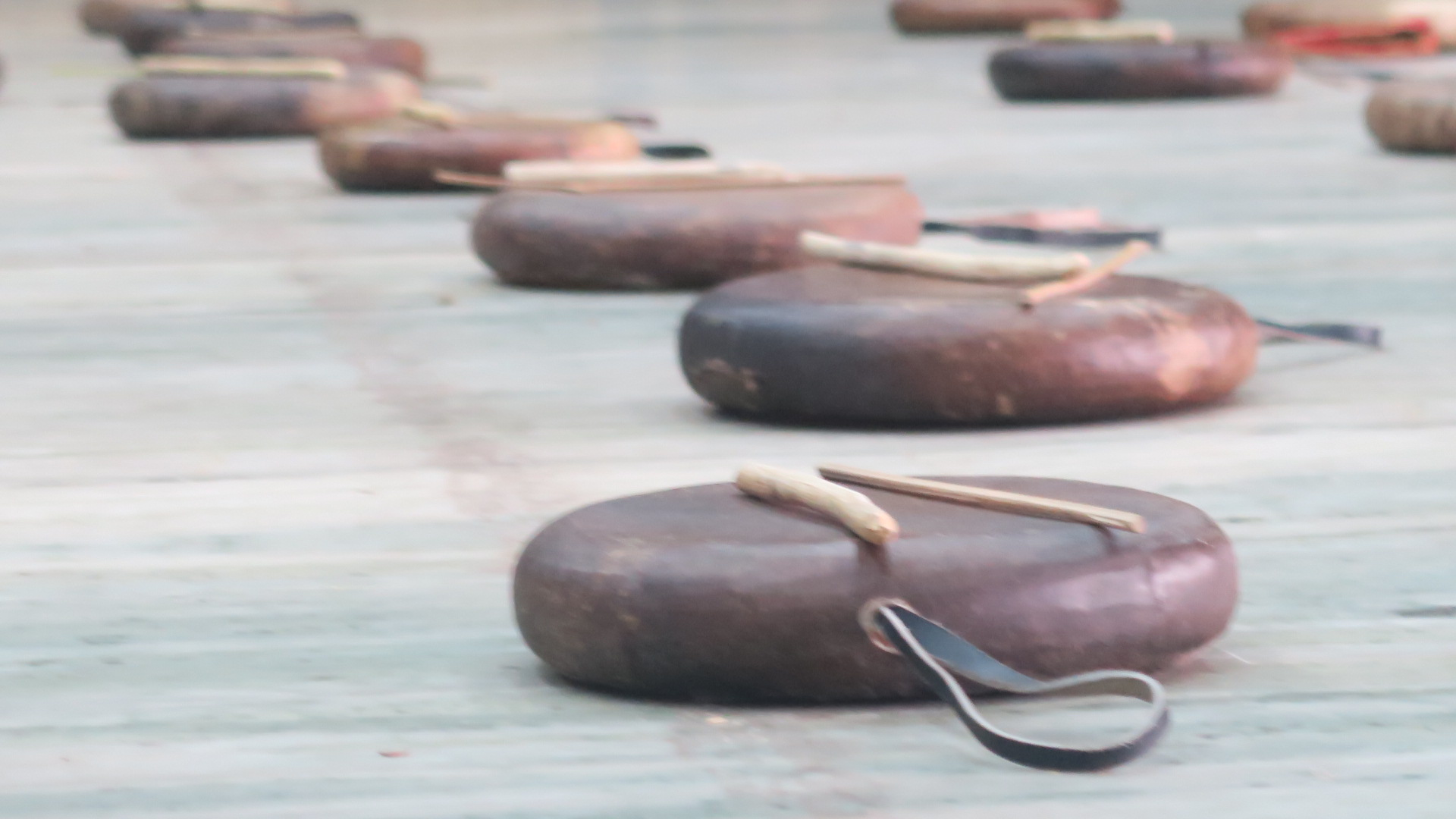

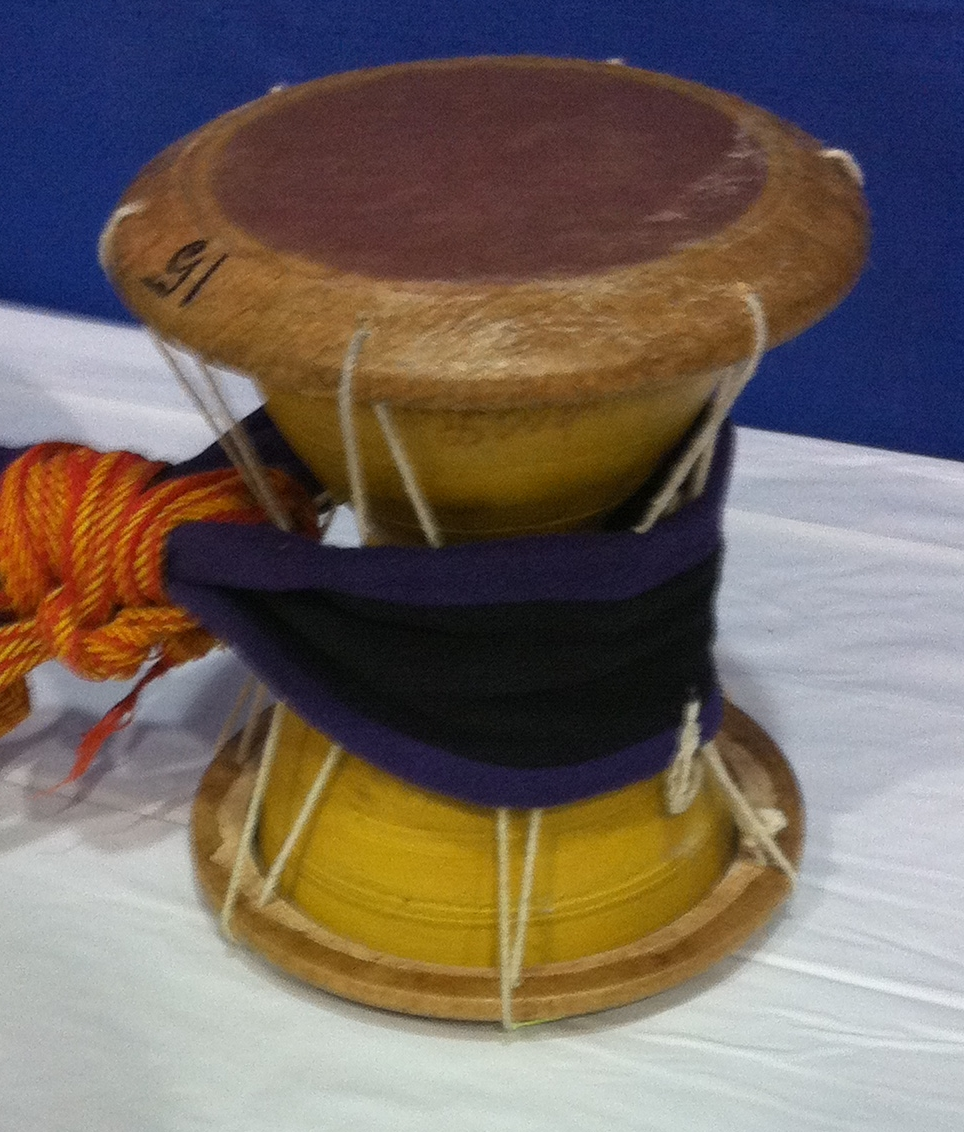

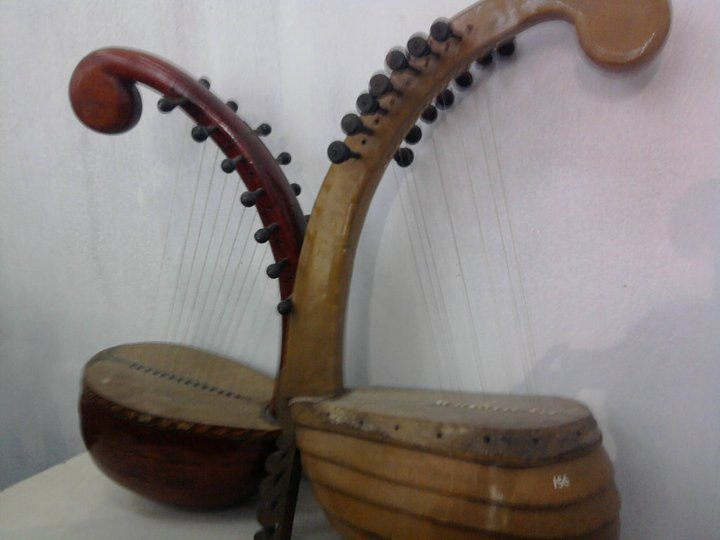

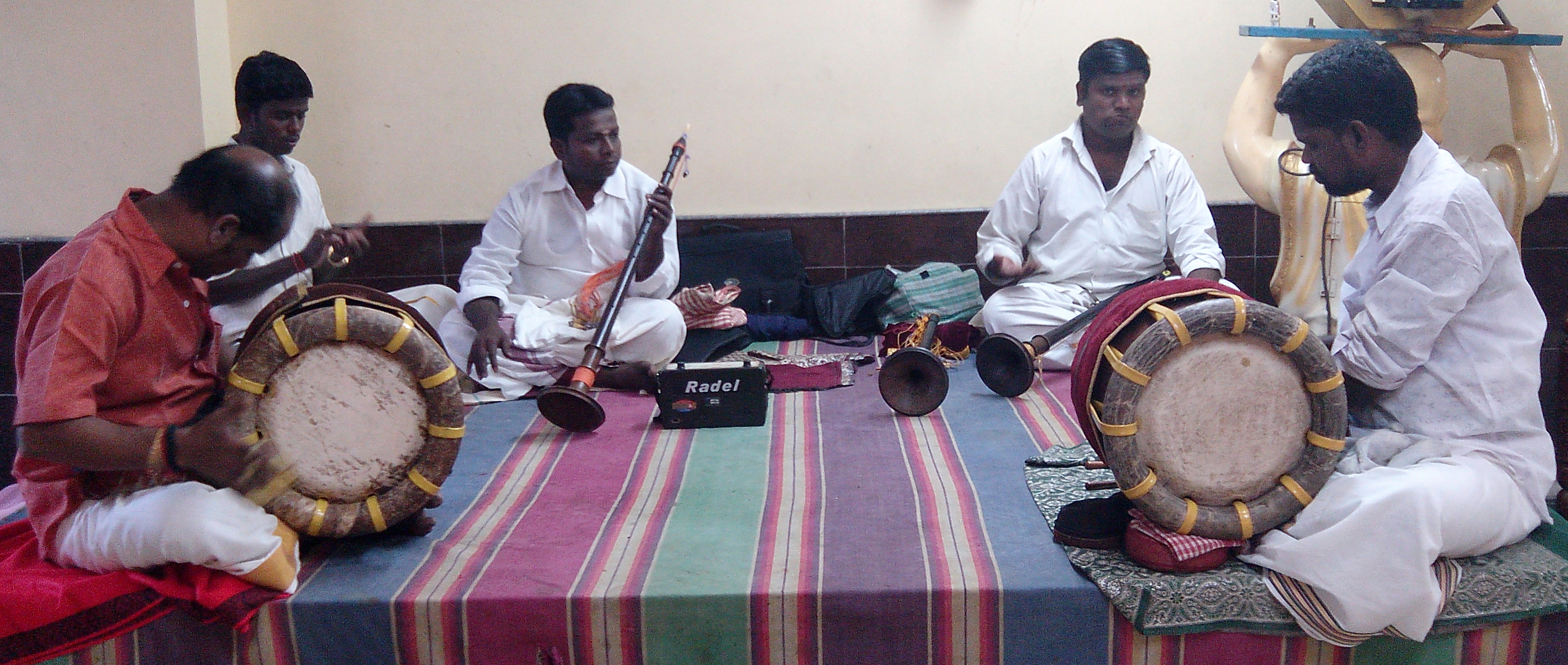

Parai attam

Parai attam

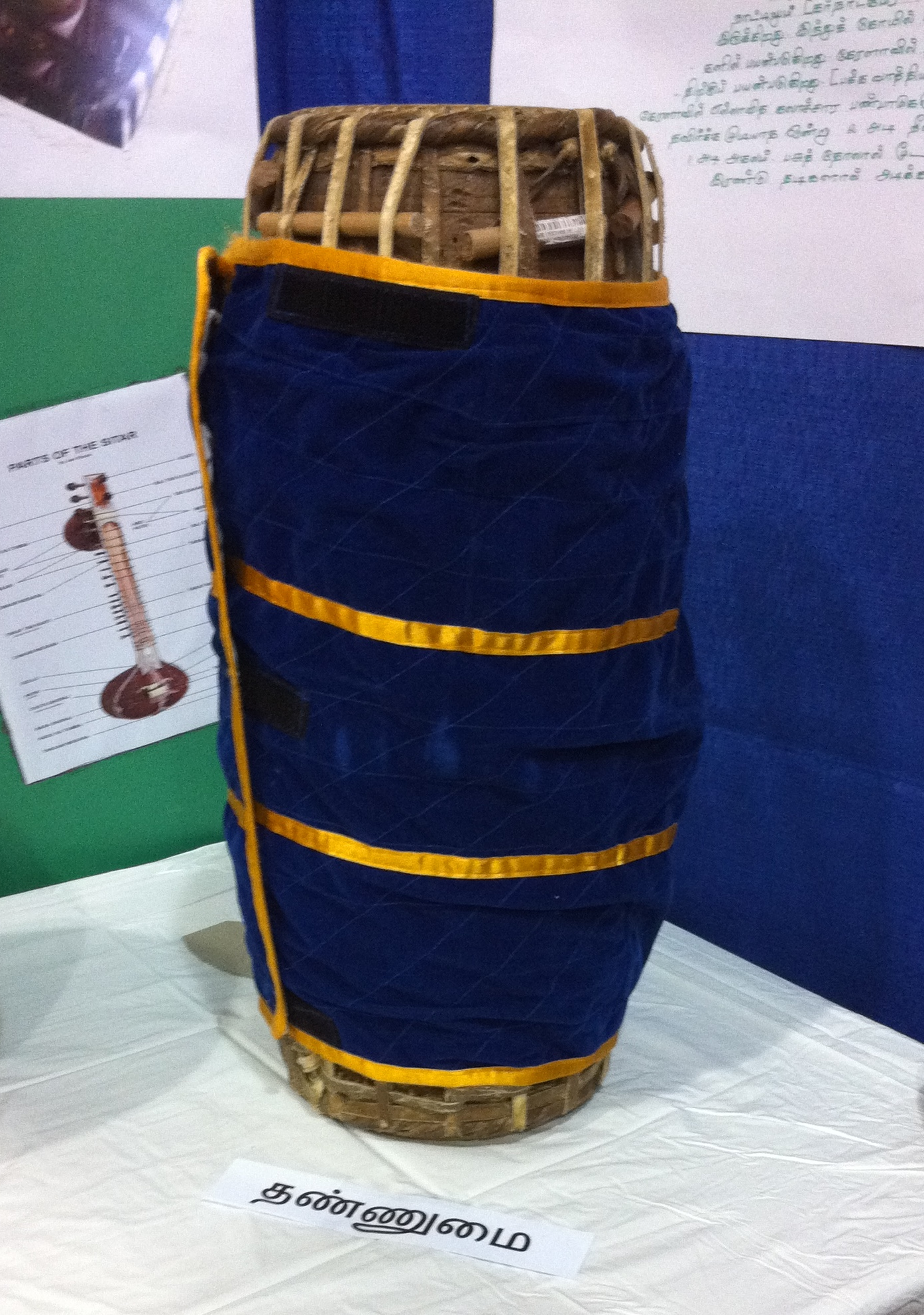

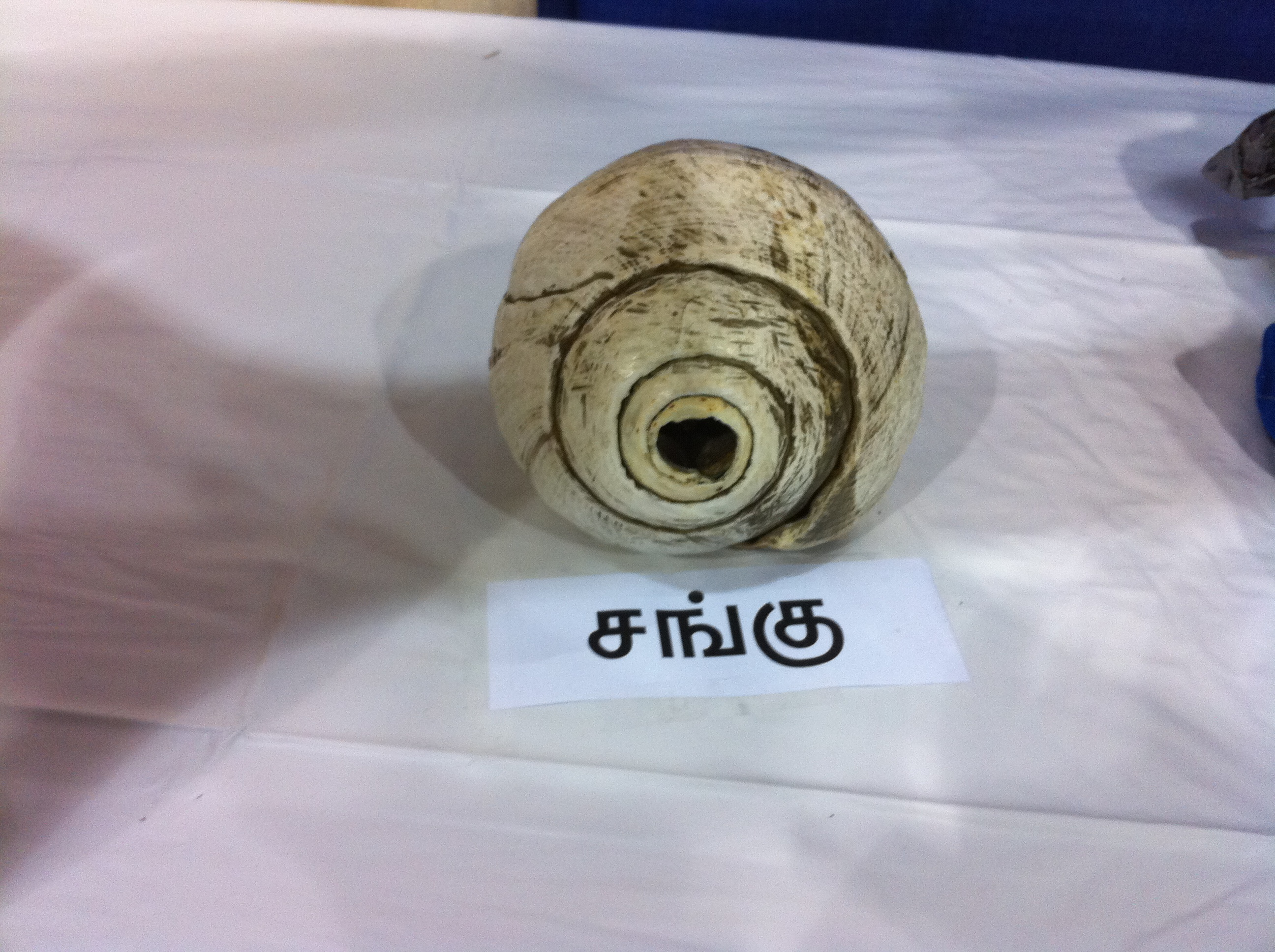

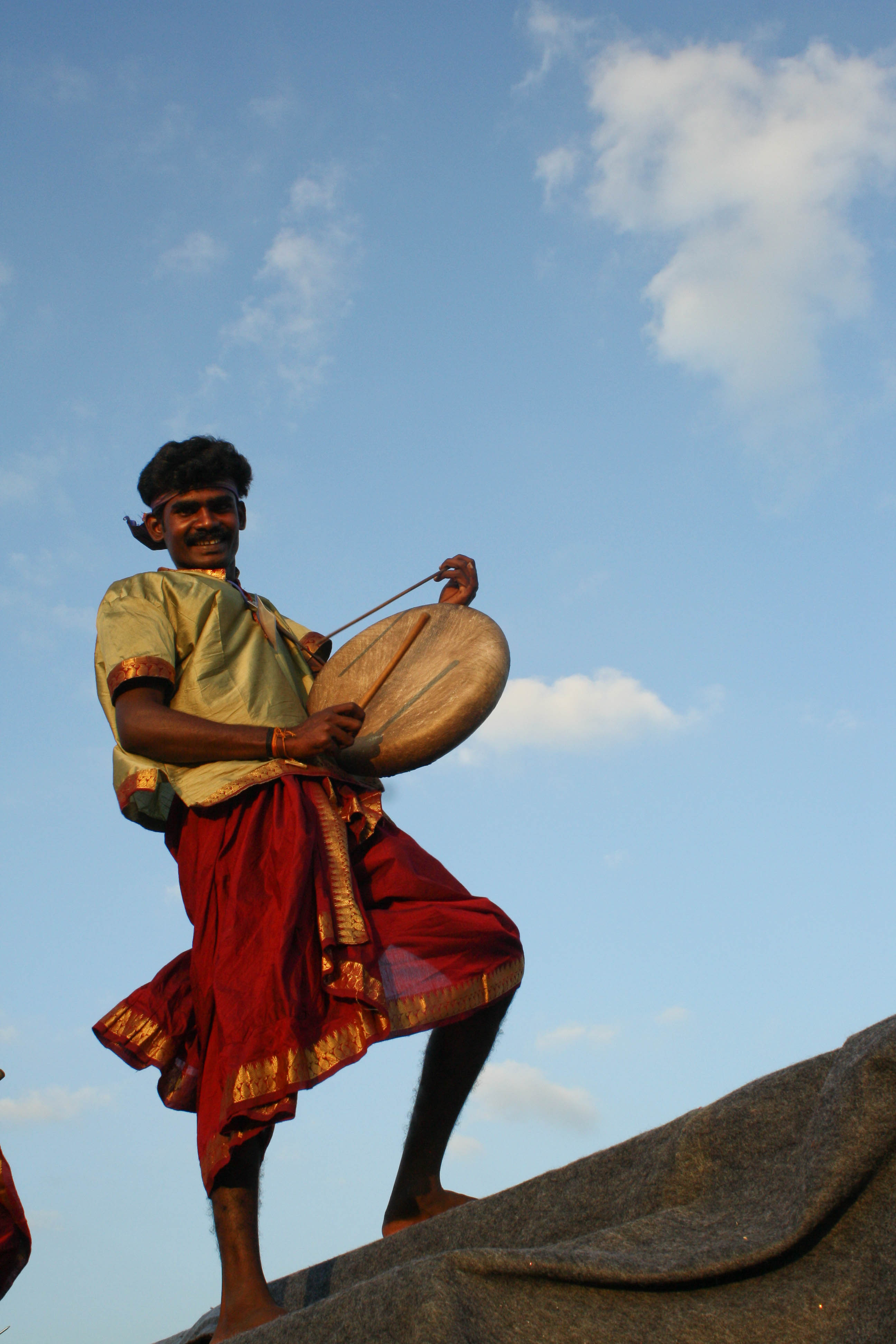

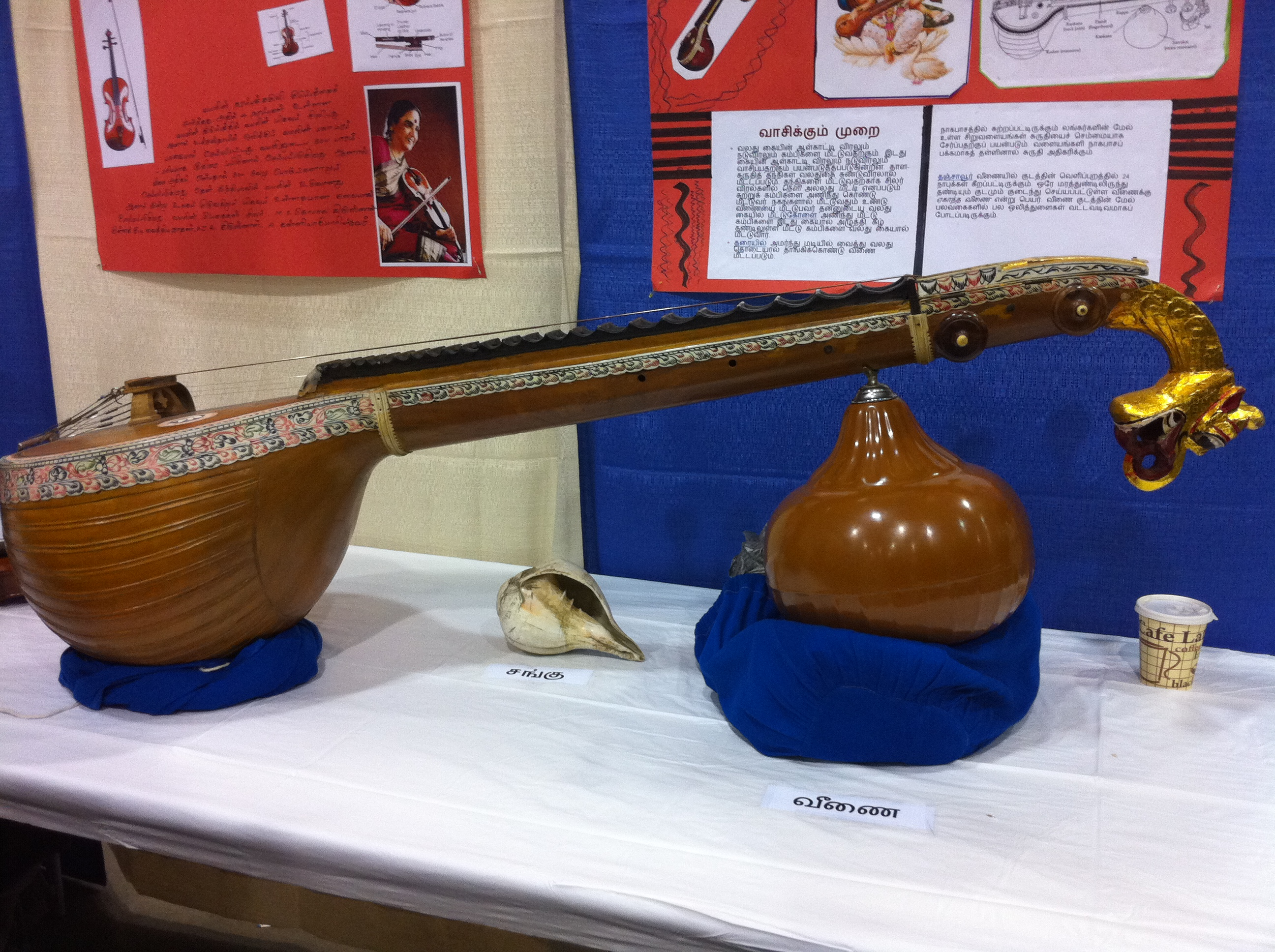

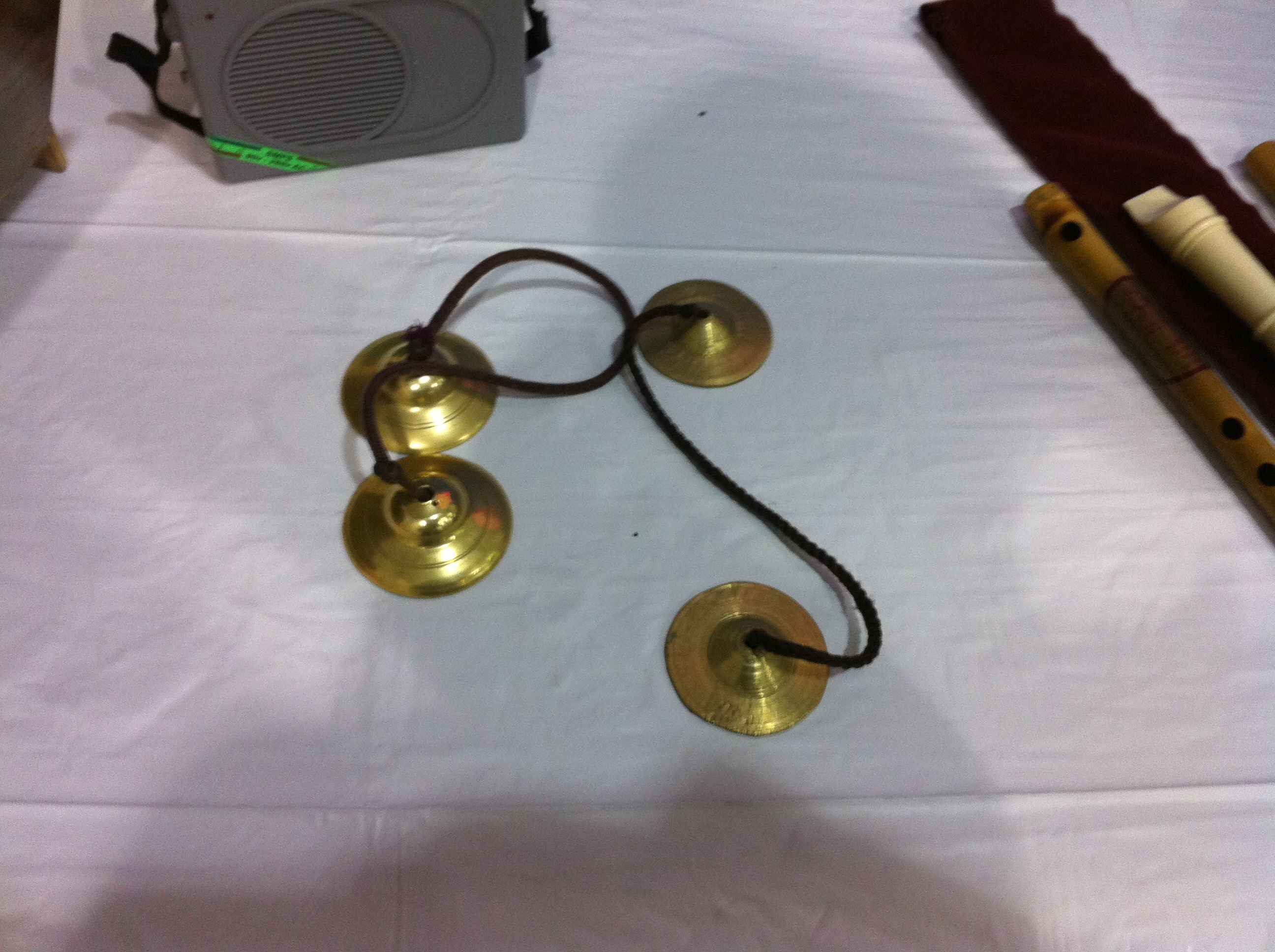

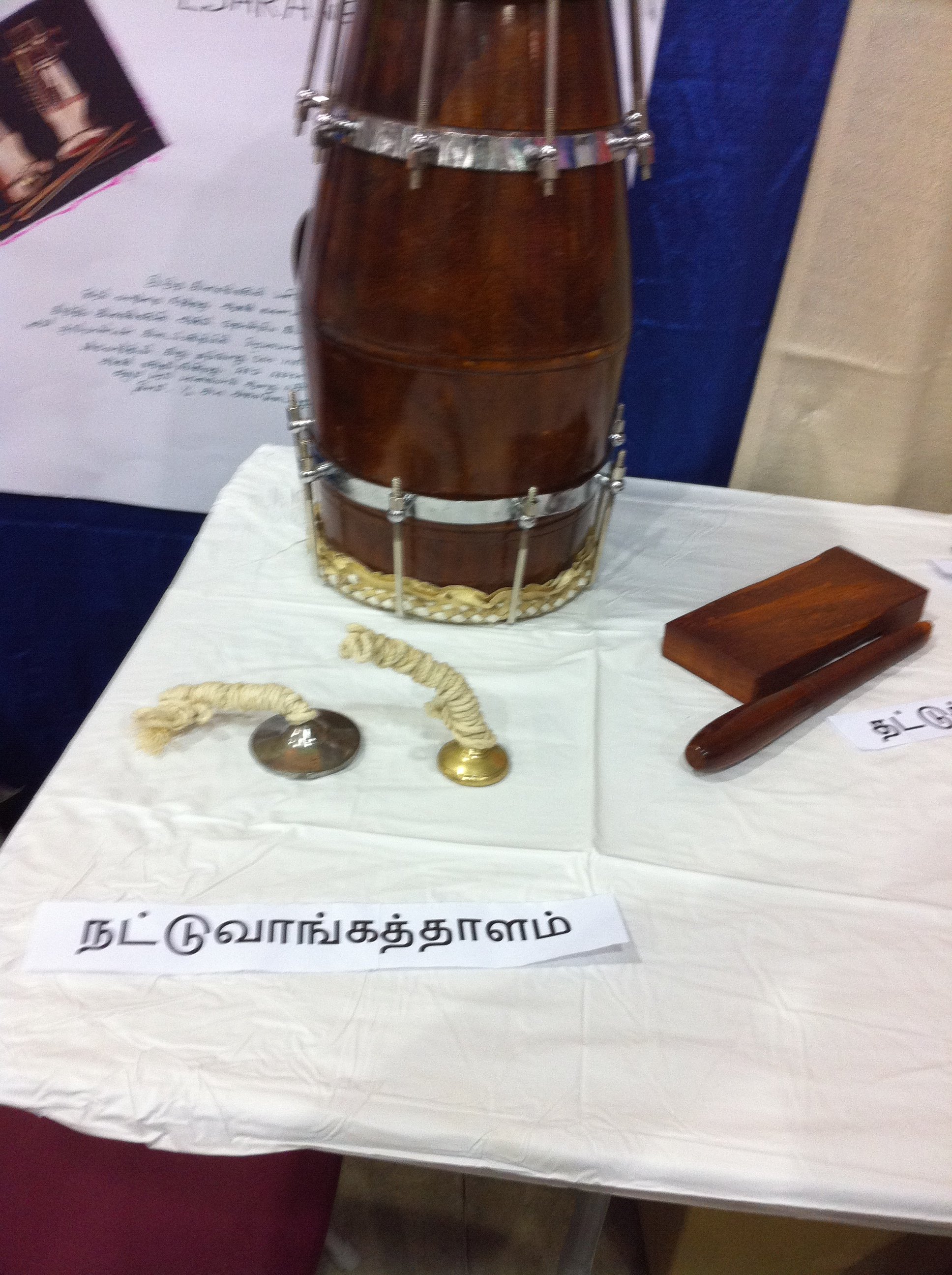

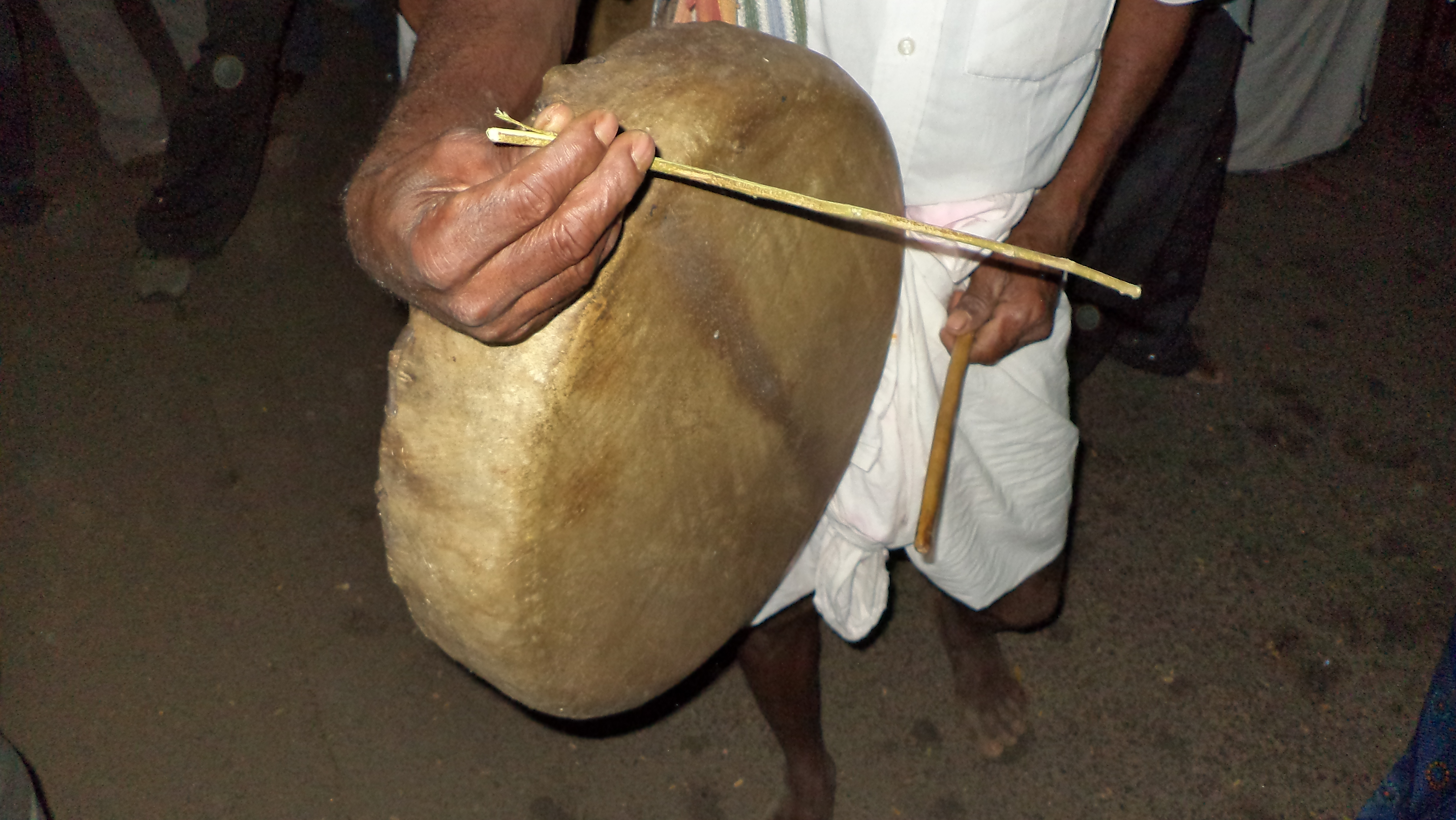

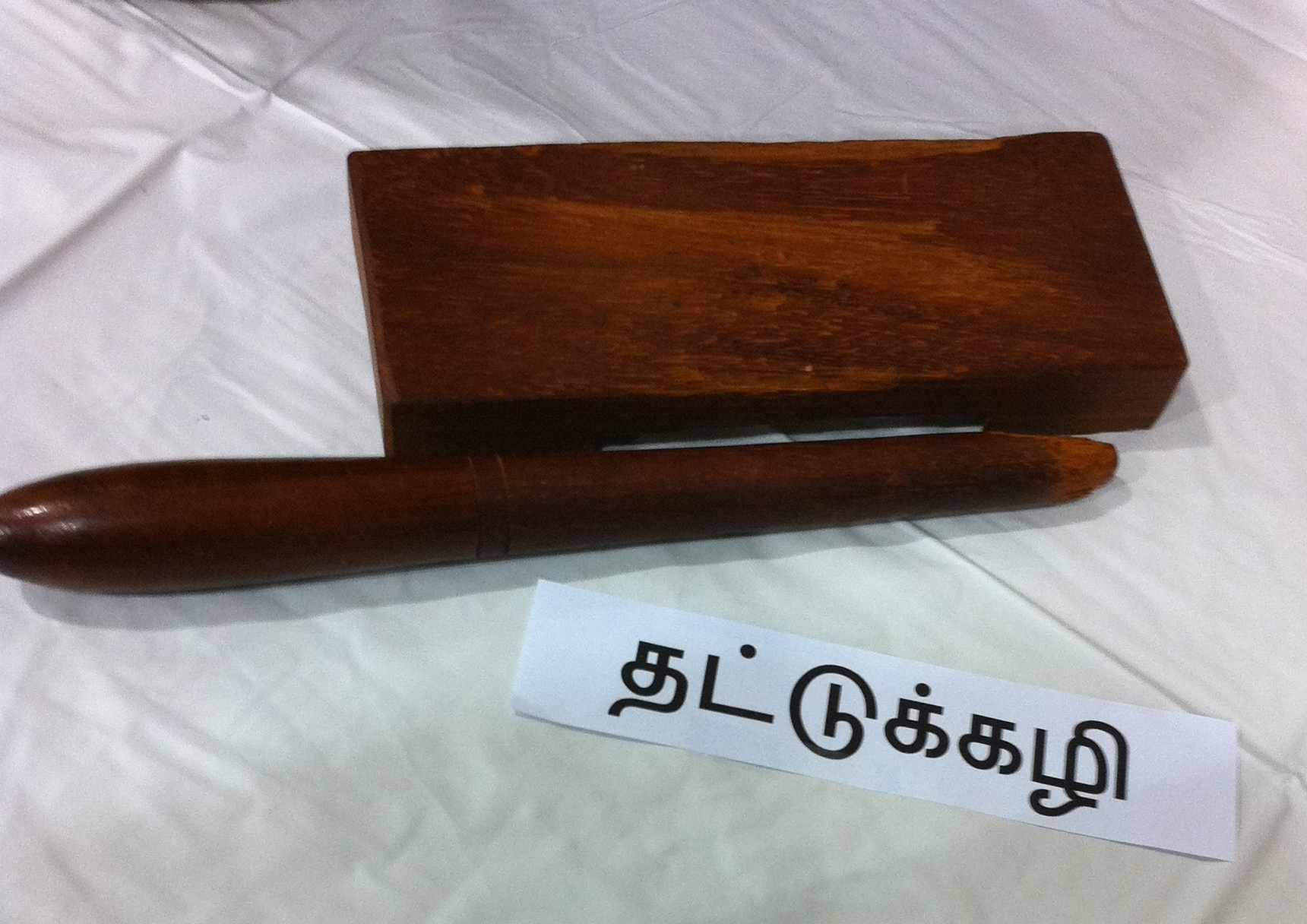

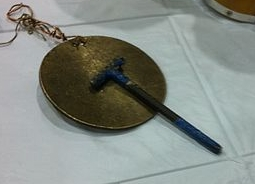

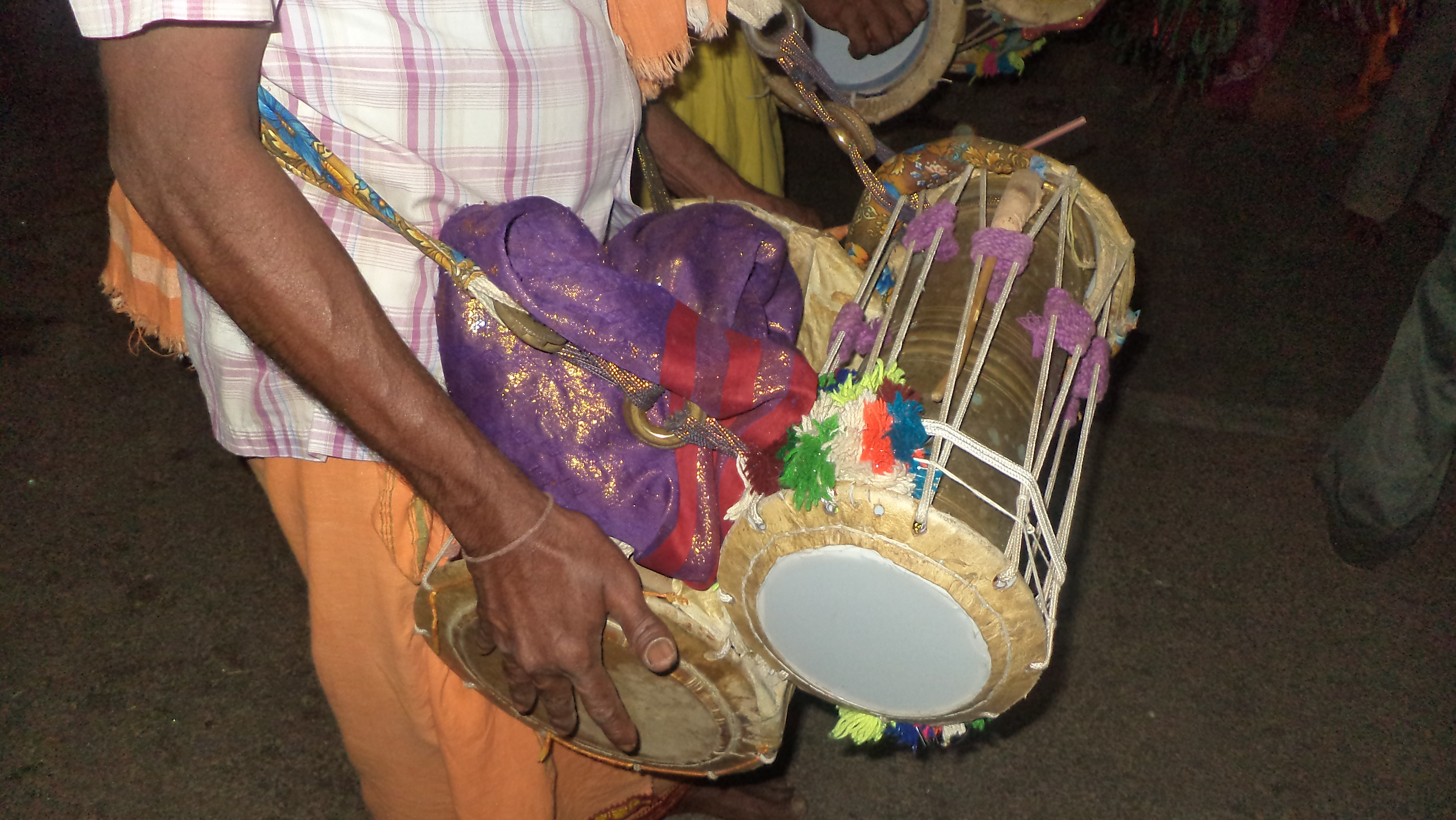

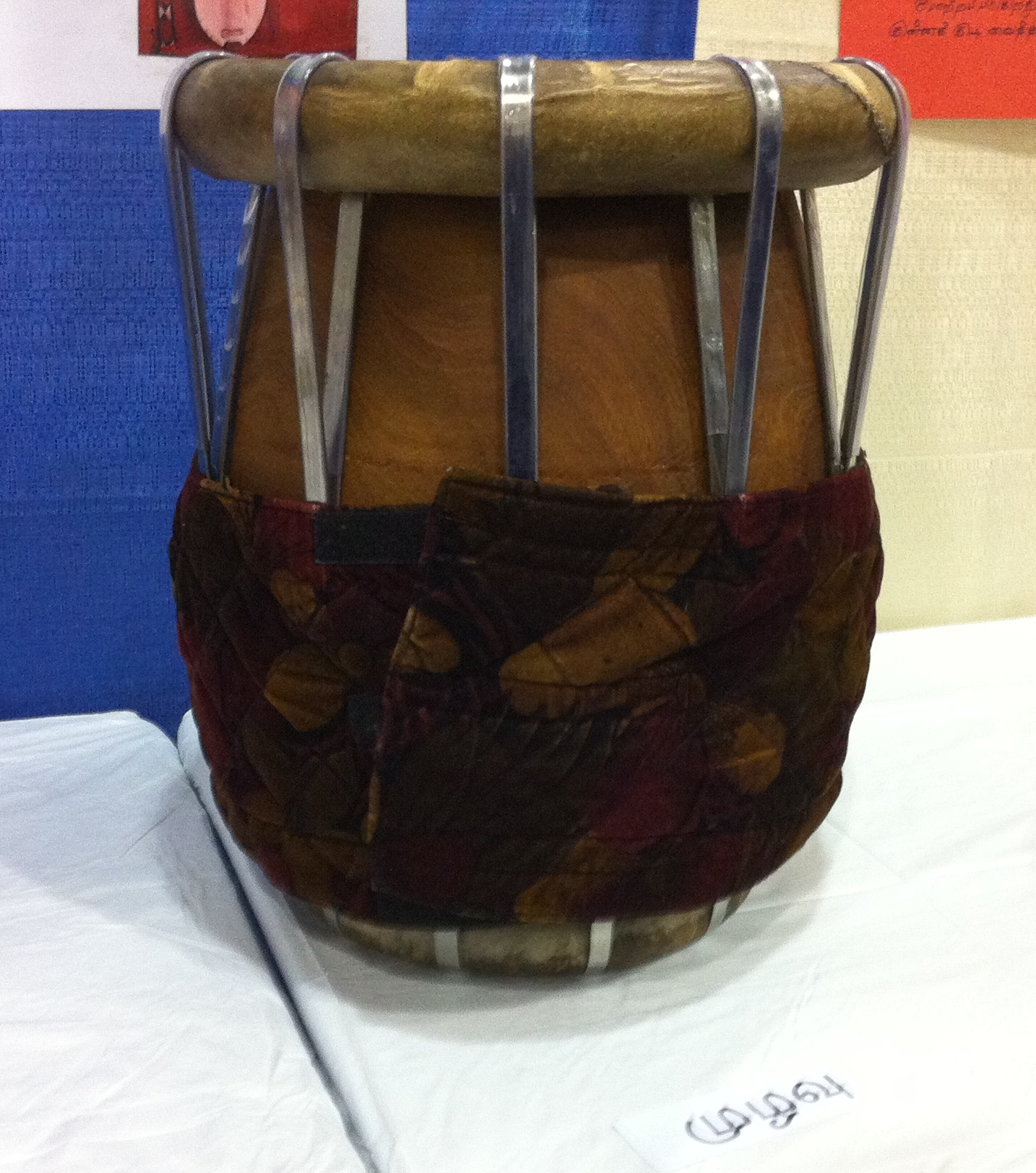

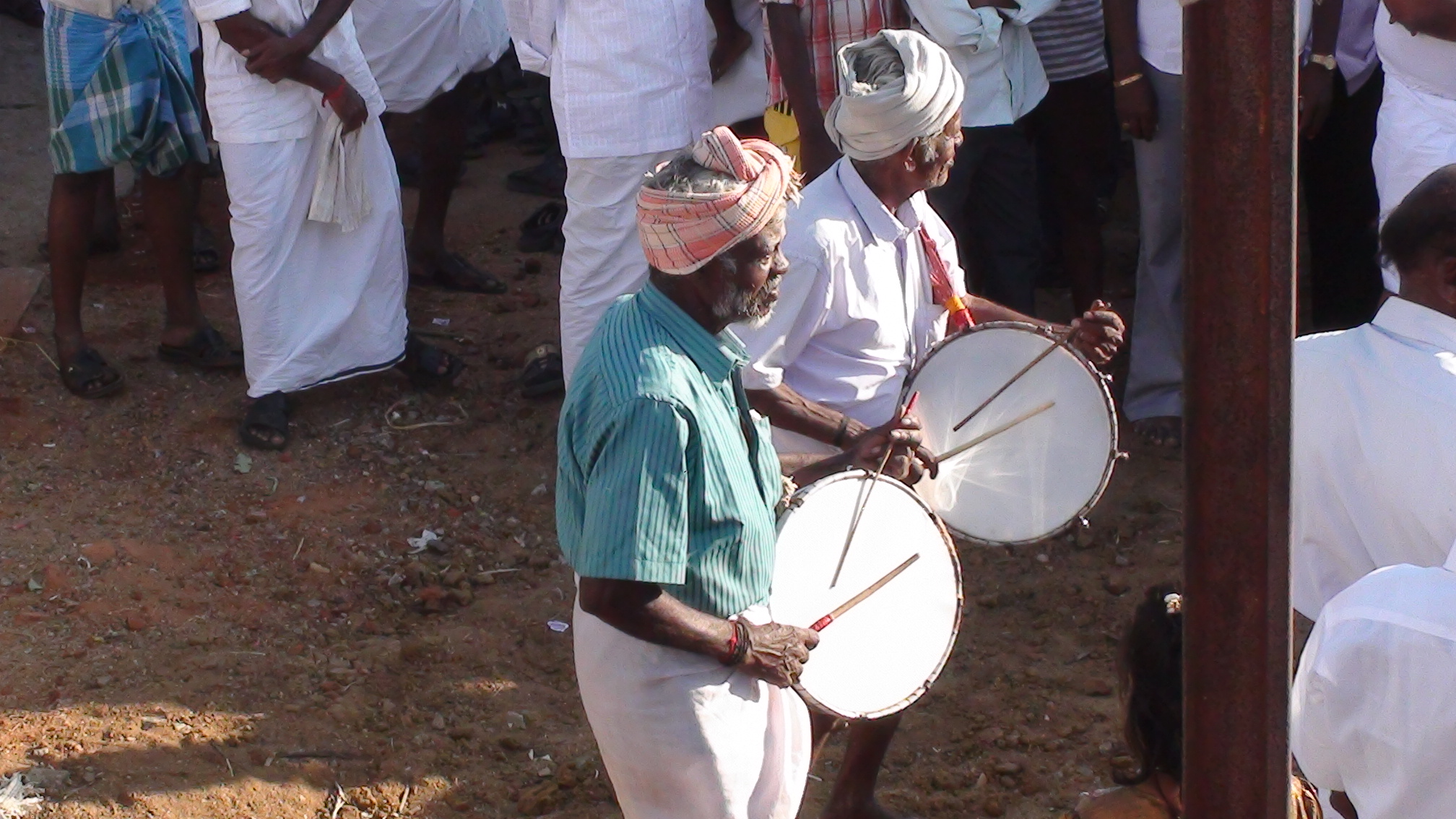

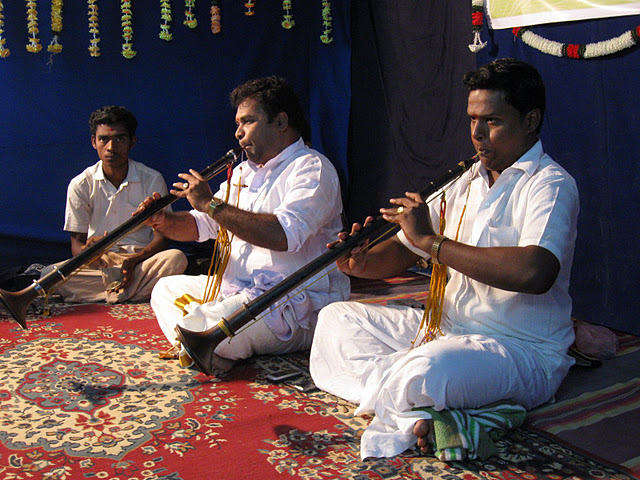

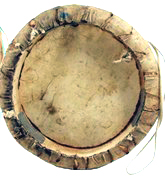

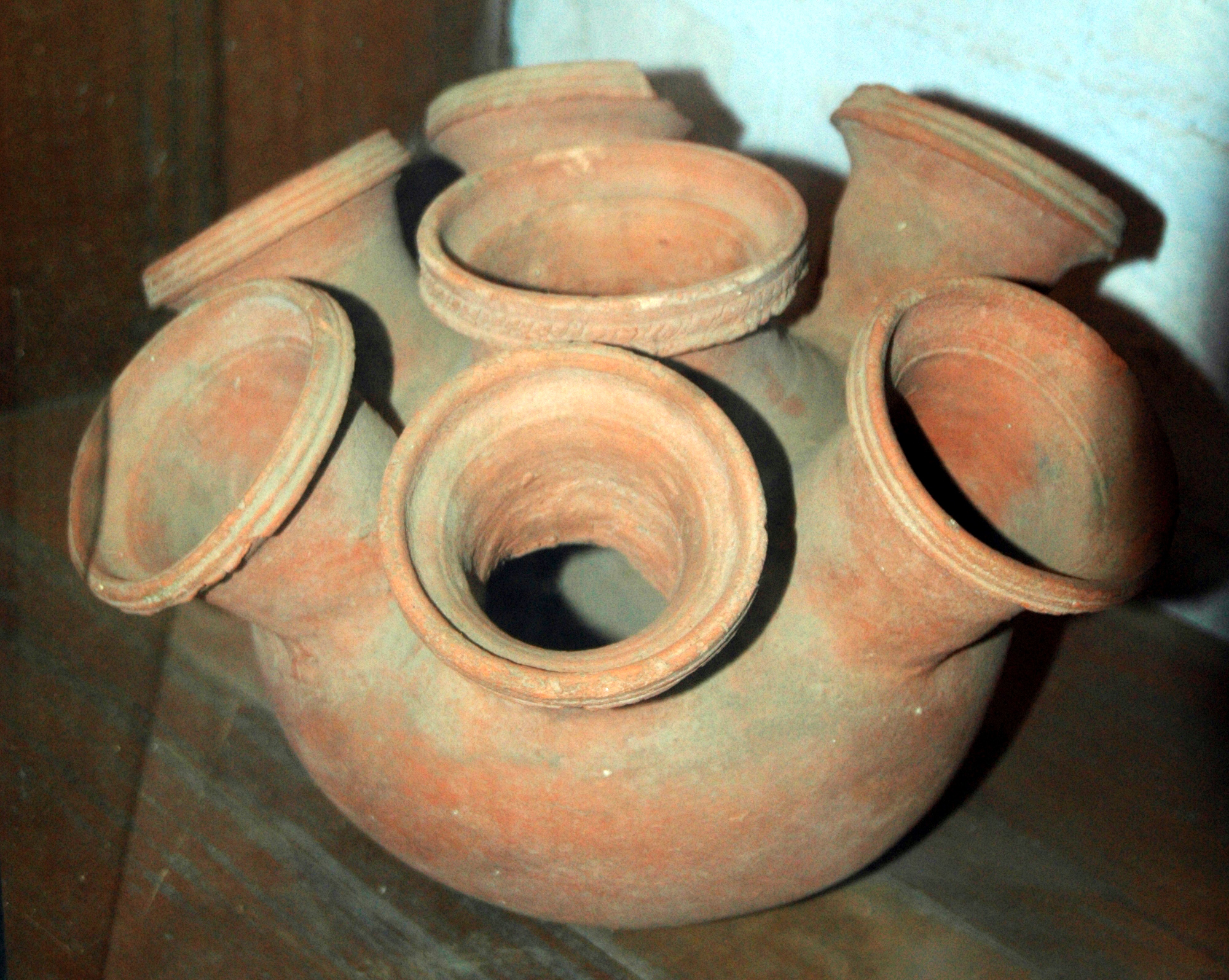

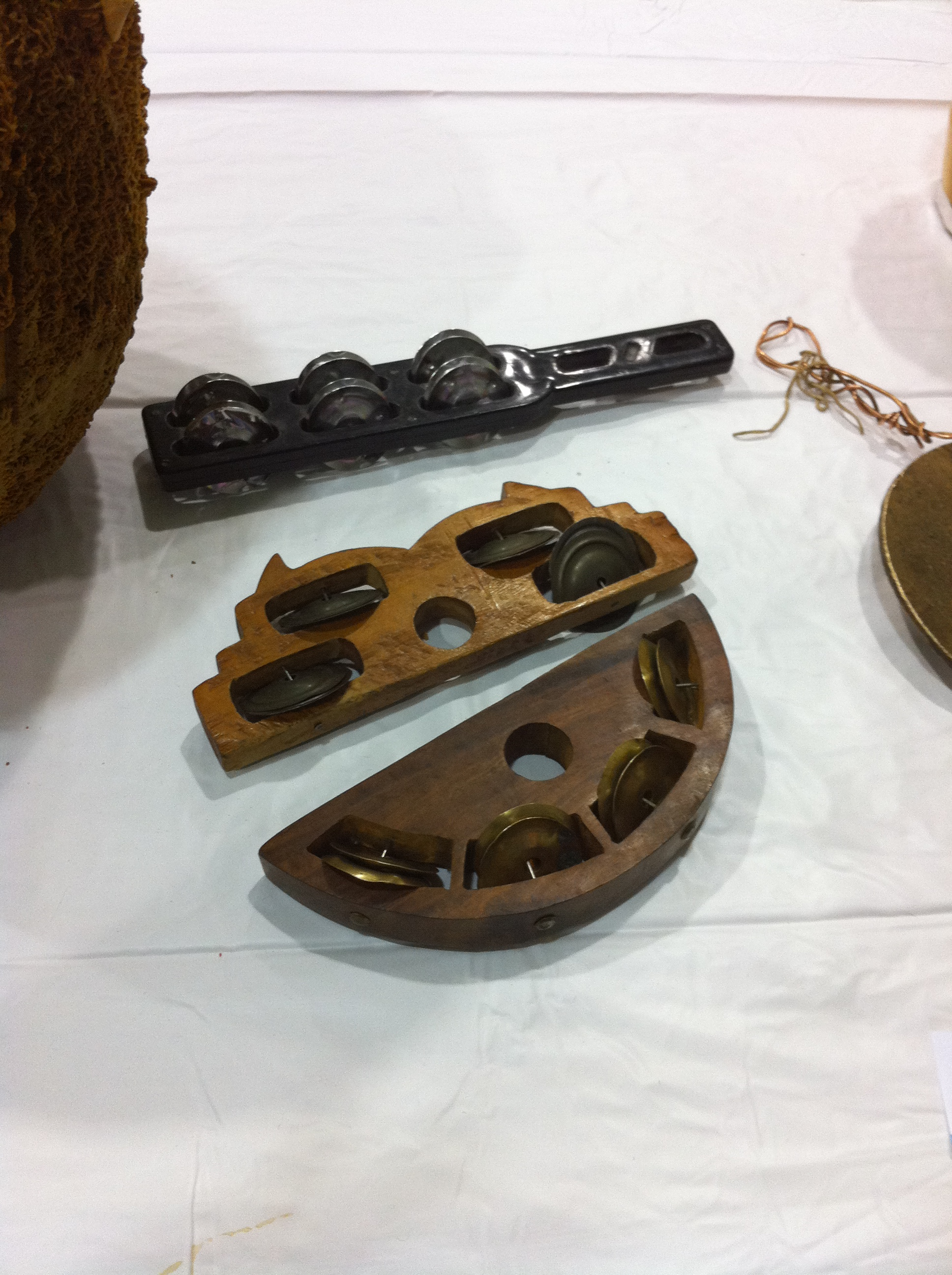

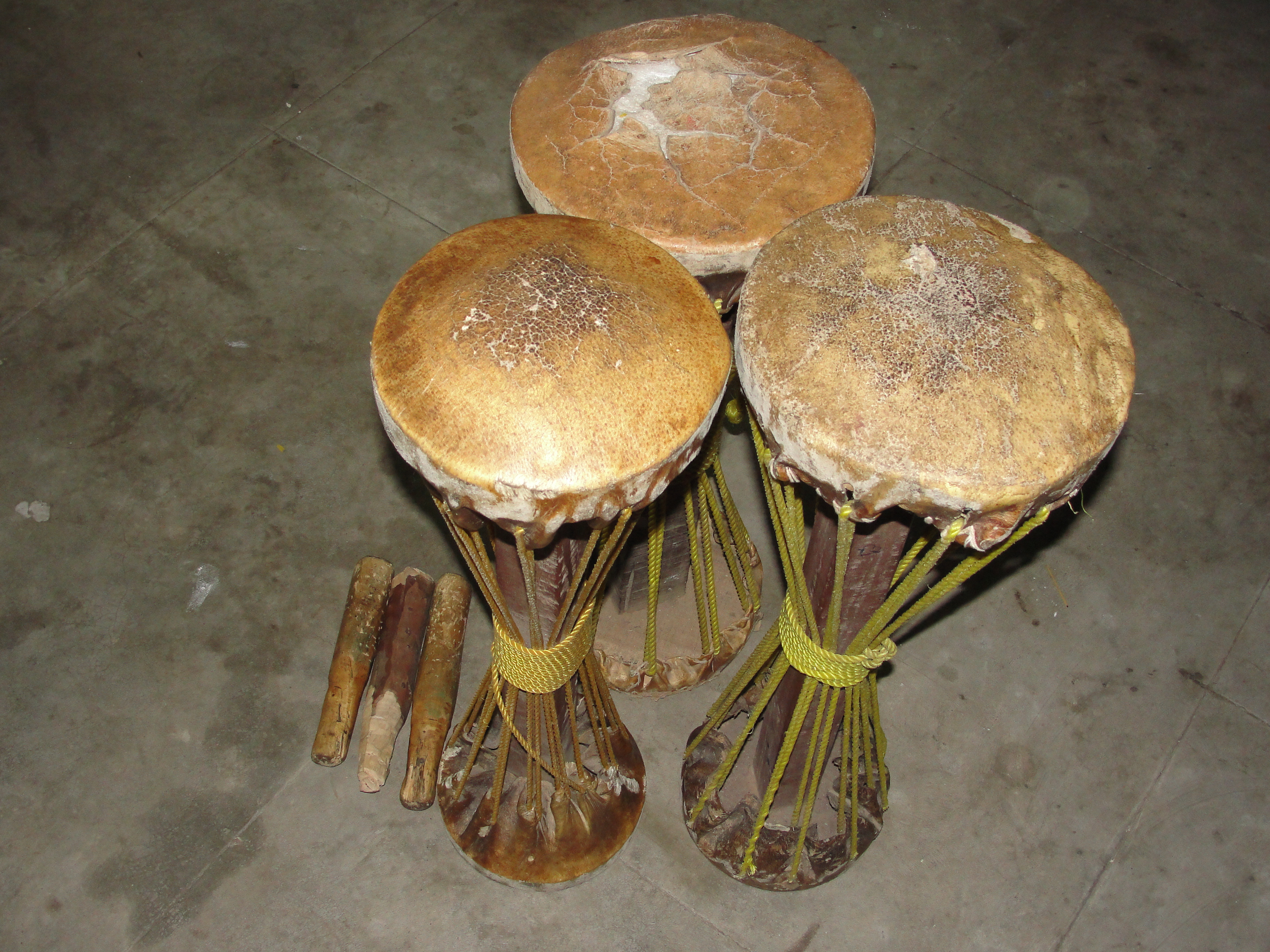

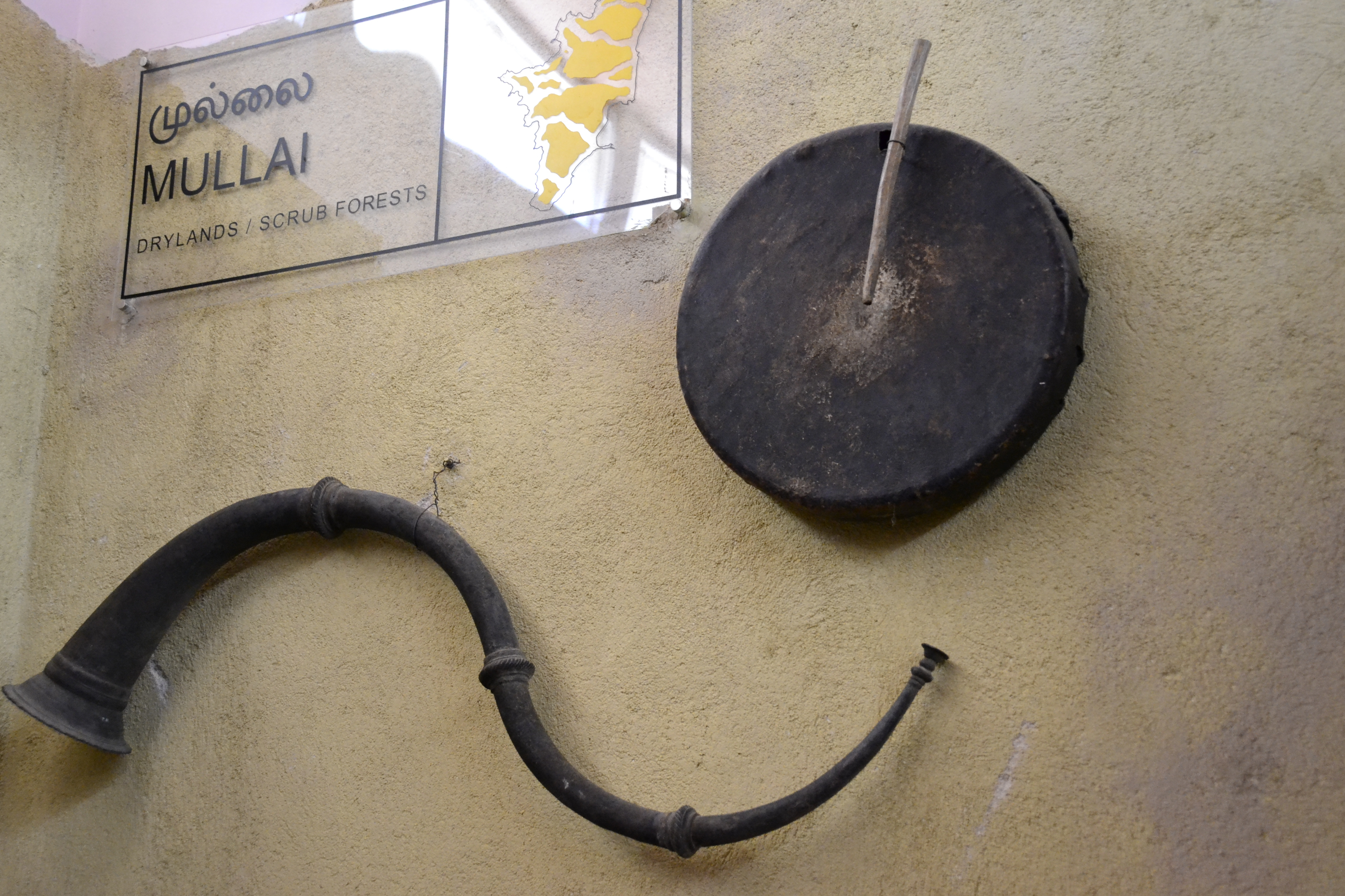

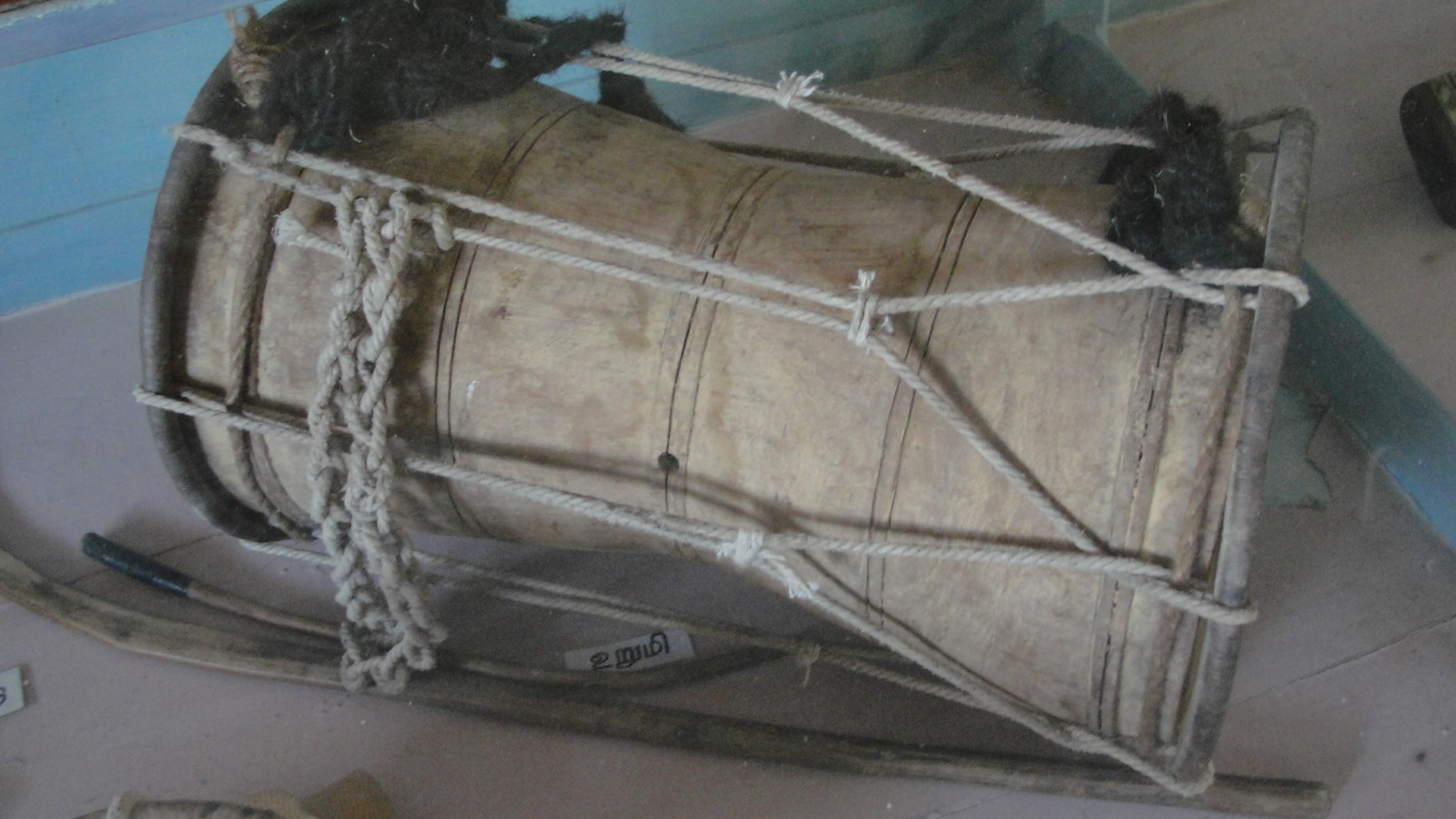

== See also ==
- Sangam literature
- Tamil literature
- Tamil music
- History of Tamil Nadu
- Carnatic music
- Dance forms of Tamil Nadu
- Naattupurapaattu
- Pancha Marapu
