= Cindu =

Cindu may refer to:

- Chemische Industrie Uithoorn, (CINDU), Dutch chemical company
- One of the divisions of Tamil music dealt with in the Pancha Marapu
- Chronic inducible urticaria (CIndU), a type of autoimmune urticaria
