= Naattupurapaattu =

- Video of Parai (Thappu) recital by a child.
- Other names: Naattupura Paattu
- Stylistic origins: Ancient Tamil music
- Cultural origins: Tamil folk culture

Naattupura Paattu is a form of Tamil folk music and Tamil folk culture.

Tamil Nadu has a very ancient and rich form of folk music, some of which is disappearing due to the importance given to Carnatic music as well as the pop movie industries taking over.

Some of the well known Tamil folk singers today are Dr. Vijayalakshmi Navaneethakrishnan, Pushpavanam Kuppusamy, Anitha Kuppusamy, Chinnaponnu Paravai Muniyamma, Senthil Ganesh, and Rockstar Ramani Ammal. The music consists of Gamathisai, which is the folk music of the village and Gana, the city folk music.

The songs are generally accompanied by traditional drums and Nadaswaram, and they are often accompanied by a traditional dance performance.

== In the media ==
The likes of Paravai Muniamma notably propagated Tamil folk songs through films and radio programs.
