= Pann =

Tamil heptatonic scale

PaN (Tamil: பண்) is the melodic mode used by the Tamil people in their music since the ancient times. The ancient pans over centuries evolved first into a pentatonic scale. But from the earliest times, Tamil Music is heptatonic and known as ēḻisai (ஏழிசை).

== PaNs in literature ==
There are several references to music and PaNs in the ancient pre-Sangam and Sangam literature starting from the earliest known work Tolkāppiyam (500 BCE). Among Sangam literature, Maturaikkañci refers to women singing sevvaḻippaN to invoke the mercy of God during childbirth. In Tolkāppiyam, the five landscapes of the Sangam literature had each an associated PaN, each describing the mood of the song associated with that landscape. Among the numerous paNs that find mention in the ancient Tamil literature are, Ambal PaN, which is suitable to be played on the flute, sevvaḻippaN on the yāḻ (lute), Nottiram and Sevvaḻi expressing pathos, the captivating KuriñcippaN and the invigorating MarudappaN.

The Sangam landscape was classified into five regions to describe the mood of the poem and to describe the intangibles of human emotions. While describing life and romance, the poets employed the background of the natural landscape and used the paN specific to that landscape to provide the mood. The Neital (seaside) landscape, which is employed to convey the grief of separation of lovers had the associated sevvaḻippaN expressing pathos.

Malaipaṭukaṭām mentions ViRaliyar singing KuriñcipaN when offering worship to the deities of the mountainous regions. It also refers to ViRali singing MarudappaN before singing the eulogies of kings. Malaipaṭukaṭām also refers to the people trying to overcome their fatigue by singing MarudappaN after working in the fields. There is a very interesting reference to paNs and birds/insects in Perumpāṇāṟṟuppaṭai. It says that the beetles liked to listen to KuriñcipaN played on Vilyaḻ thinking it to be the voice of its own kith and kin, while they hated to laNen to PālaipaN played on the flute. There are also references to the pāNar taking delight in mastering the NaivaLam paN.

== Evolution of PaNs ==
In the post-Sangam period, between the third and the fifth centuries CE, Tamil music evolved to a higher sophistication. Cilappatikāram, written around the fifth century CE, describes music based on logical, systematic and scientific calculations in the arrangements of the dancers on the stage to represent the notes and panns. Cilappatikāram contains several chapters dedicated to music and dance, of which the most famous is the kanal vari which is a duet between the hero Kōvalan and his lady-love Mādavi. Cilappatikāram contains musical terminology such as, alaku and māttirai referring to the musical pitch and the smallest fraction of an audible sound distinguishable by the human ear. From these evolved the scales.

=== Development of scales ===
One of the first scales employed by the ancient Tamils was the MullaippaN, a pentatonic scale composed of the notes sa ri ga pa da equivalent to C, D, E, G and A in the western notations. These fully harmonic scales, constitutes the raga Mohanam in the Carnatic music style.

MullaippaN further evolved into sempālai, a scale based on seven notes by the addition of two more notes, ma and ni to the pentatonic scale. SempālaippaN corresponds to the Carnatic raga Harikambhoji. In ancient Tamil, the seven notes were termed kural, tuttam, kaikkiLai, uḻai, iLi, vilari and tāram. The seven basic notes are then developed into twelve swaras corresponding to the twelve houses of the zodiac.

The ancient Tamils also derived new paNs by the process of modal shift of tonic and by the process of reallocating the pitch and beat of the notes. Cilappatikāram has an example of this in the chapter ArangēRRukkādai, where the PaN MeRcarupalai is changed to derive a new Pann. By the model shift of the tonic (பண்ணுப்பெயர்த்தல் - PaNNuppeyarttal) the ancient Tamils devised the seven major palais. Using the process of the cycle of fifth (called āya palai) or the cycle of fourth, five semitones were developed. For example, if the cycle is started with kural (sa), the fifth note will yield iLi (pa), the sa-pa relationship. In the cycle of fourth, kural (sa) will give uḻai (ma), the sa-ma relationship. These five semitones were added to the original seven notes giving 12 notes of the ancient Tamil musical octave. Among the 12 notes, the flats were called kuRai (குறை) and the sharps were called niRai (நிறை).

The seven major palais or parent scales of the music of the ancient Tamils are: Sempalaipann (corresponding to the present Shankarabaranam), Padumalai palaipann (Karaharapriya), Sevvazhipalaipann (Hanumathodi), Arum Palai (Kalyani), Kodi Palai (Harikambhoji ), Vilari Palai (Natabhairavi), and MeRcem Palai (Mechakalyani).

The four original paNs of marutappaN, kuriñcippaN, sevvaḻi and saDari thus evolved into 103 paNs with varying characterisations. In all of these PaNs, Uyir SurangaL (Jīvasvarams: Life Notes) exist. The life note of a PaN is embellished according to the notes that appear immediately before and after. This is called Alankāram (Gamakam). Taking into consideration all these special notes, PaN Isai is different from Carnatic Music. Carnatic Music as two variations of each of the variables; Ri, Ga, Ma, Dha and Ni. PaN Isai has 4 variations of each of the 5 variable. Plus the 2 constants; Sa and Pa, there are 22 variations of the 7 basic notes. The ancient name for Rāgam is Niram. Mēlakarta was called Thāi Niram and Rāgams born from there were call Sēi Niram. The ancient name for TāLam is PāNi. For example, Rūpaka Tālam was PāNi MūnDRottu. Before Sa, Ri, Ga... Tamils used the 12 Tamil Vowels. Looking at a keyboard, they would've used the 5 KuRil (Short Sounds) for the black keys and the 7 NeDil (Long Sounds) for the white keys.

Some of the paNs and their equivalent Carnatic ragas were:

- Pañcamam – Ahiri
- Paḻam Pañcuram - SankarābharaNam
- Mēgarāgakkuriñci - Neelambari
- Paḻantakka Rāgam - Arabhi
- Kuriñci - Malahari
- NāTTa Rāgam – Panthuvaraali
- Intalam - Nadanamakriya
- Takkēsi - Kambhoji
- Kausikam - Bhairavi
- NāTTappadai – GambhīranāTTai
- Gāndhāra Pañcamam – Kedara Gowlai

== Panns in Saivite hymns ==
After the Sangam period and during the occupation of the Tamil country by Kalabhras, Tamil music was dormant for a period of a few centuries. With the advent of the Saivite saints Manikkavacakar (100 AD), Sundarar (900 AD), Thirunavukkarasar and Thirugnana Sambanthar (7th century CE) who used the ancient panns in their hymns (Tevaram), Tamil music experienced a revival. Only through these Tirumurais, hymns by Seerkaazhi Muthuthaandavar, hymn by Marimutha Pillai, Arunagirinathar, Ramalinga Swamigal and the hymns of Vaishnavite Alvars we can still experience the ancient traditions of the Tamil panns. Sambanthar used the following seven panns: nattapaadai, Thakka ragam, Paḻanthakka ragam, Thakkesi, Kurinji, Viyazhak kurinji, and Meharahakkurinji. Manikkavacagar used Mulai Pann (Mohana Raagam) for the majority of his Thiruvasagam and Thirukkovaiyar. There are a few of his hymns where he used Bowli, Megaragakkurinji and Kalyaani. Sundaramoorthi SwamigaL wise widely influenced by Thirunyaanasambandhar SwamigaL and Thirunaavukkarasar 'Appar' SwamigaL, who used PaN Koli quite often. In actual, only Thirunaavukkarasar SwamigaL sang the Dhehvaaram, which made-up the 4th, 5th and 6th ThirumuRaigaL. Thirunyaanasambandhar SwamigaL wrote the ThirukaDaikaapu, which makes up the 1st, 2nd and 3rd ThirumuRaigaL. Thiru Sundharamoorthi SwamigaL wrote the ThirupaaTTu, which makes up the 7th ThirumuRai. Thiru MaaNikkavaasagar's Thiruvaasagam and Thirukkohvaiyaar makes up the 8th ThirumuRai. There 12 ThirumuRais. Thirumoolar's Thirumandhiram is the 10th ThirumuRai and SekkiZHaar's Thiru ThoNDar PuraaNam, or Periya PuraaNam is the 12th ThirumuRai. The ThirumuRais are the Devotional works of Saivaism and the 14 SaathirangaL (Saathirais) are the philosophical works of Saivaism, with ThiruvaLuvar's ThirkkuRaL accepted as Neethi nool or Saathiram (Singular form of SaathirangaL).

== See also ==
- Ancient Tamil music
