= Valli Vara Pora =

- Title card
- Directed by: S. V. Solai Raja
- Screenplay by: S. V. Solai Raja
- Story by: Gireesh Puthenchery
- Produced by: M. Padmanabhan; S. Nivethan
- Starring: Pandiarajan; Mohana; Nirosha
- Cinematography: M. V. Kalyan
- Edited by: S. Ashok Mehta
- Music by: K. S. Mani Oli
- Production company: Greenways Film International
- Release date: 10 February 1995
- Running time: 130 minutes
- Country: India
- Language: Tamil

Valli Vara Pora (transl. Valli is about to arrive) is a 1995 Indian Tamil-language comedy film directed by S. V. Solai Raja in his debut. The film stars Pandiarajan, Mohana and Nirosha, with Vinu Chakravarthy, Vijaya Lalitha, Vennira Aadai Moorthy, Charle, Muralikumar, Pasi Narayanan and Kumarimuthu playing supporting roles. It is a remake of the 1993 Malayalam film Meleparambil Anveedu. The film was released on 10 February 1995, and failed at the box office.

== Plot ==
Meenakshi and Ayyasamy have three sons : Periyapandi, Thangapandi and Chinna Paandi. The three brothers are bachelors, Chinna Paandi is the only graduate of his family. Kavitha, a relative, is in love with Chinna Paandi but he has no feelings towards her. Chinna Paandi sets out for a Kerala village to work as manager of a courier company. There, he meets a Kerala woman named Pavalam, she falls in love with him but her father Menon wants Pavalam to get married against her will. Chinna Paandi and Pavalam fall in love with each other and they try to elope from the village, unfortunately, the villagers finally catch them. Menon, the village chief, accepts for their marriage and both get married. Later, that same day, he learns of his transfer to his native village. Chinna Paandi is afraid of whether or not his parents would agree to their marriage, so he keeps Pavalam undercover as a maid in his home. His brothers Periyapandi and Thangapandi fall in love with Pavalam. What transpires next forms the rest of the story.

== Cast ==
- Pandiarajan as Chinna Paandi
- Mohana as Pavalam
- Nirosha as Kavitha
- Vinu Chakravarthy as Menon
- Vijaya Lalitha as Meenakshi
- Vennira Aadai Moorthy as Ayyasamy
- Charle as Thangapandi
- Muralikumar as Periya Paandi
- Pasi Narayanan as Narayanan
- Kumarimuthu as Postman
- Bhavani Prasad
- Usha Nayar
- Manager Cheena as Marriage broker
- Karikalan
- Idichapuli Selvaraj
- Sundaram
- Appadurai

== Soundtrack ==
The music was composed by K. S. Mani Oli, with lyrics by Piraisoodan (Rootula Jootula), Pattukottai Shanmugasundaram and Ramadaasan.

Song	Singer(s)	Duration
"Ammadi Rathiri"	Mano	4:50
"Thaluku Kuluki"	Shahul Hameed, Suresh Peters	3:28
"Ponnu Romba Joruthan"	Pushpavanam Kuppusamy, Anitha Kuppusamy	2:56
"Jinggu Jangu"	S. P. Balasubrahmanyam, Swarnalatha	4:49
"Rootula Juttula"	Malgudi Subha	4:02
"Theendamal"	Malgudi Subha	4:24

== Reception ==
Thulasi of Kalki wrote the director's debut film has taken off impressively, so hats off.
