= Karisakattu Poove =

- Poster
- Directed by: Kasthuri Raja
- Written by: Kasthuri Raja
- Produced by: Vijayalakshmi Kasthuri Raja
- Starring: Napoleon; Vineeth; Khushbu; Ravali
- Cinematography: R. Raja Ratnam
- Edited by: D. Chandrasekaran
- Music by: Ilaiyaraaja
- Production company: Kasthoori Manga Creations
- Release date: 23 June 2000
- Running time: 140 minutes
- Country: India
- Language: Tamil

Karisakattu Poove is a 2000 Indian Tamil-language drama film directed by Kasthuri Raja. The film stars Napoleon, Vineeth, Khushbu and Ravali. It was released on 23 June 2000.

== Plot ==
The young man Pounrasu has a brother Kottaisaamy and a sister. Pounrasu is secretly in love with his sister's daughter Nagamani. Pounrasu then returns to his native village after studying in the city and he still loves her.

Nagamani's father fixes up Nagamani's marriage with a rowdy for money but her mother wants her brother Pounrasu to marry Nagamani. Finally, Kottaisaamy gets engaged with Nagamani and Pounrasu is unable to speak up against his brother.

Kottaisaamy's family and his uncle's family are in a feud for several years only because Kottaisaamy sends his uncle in jail. Kottaisaamy and Nagamani get ready for the wedding. Meanwhile, Sankarapandian, his uncle, manages to provide a wrong message to Kottaisaamy that Aandal's marriage was a forced marriage. Kottaisaamy immediately cancels Aandal's marriage and Kottaisaamy is forced to marry Aandal. Nagamani feels betrayed and cannot forget her beloved Kottaisaamy.

Kottaisaamy and Aandal could not live happily and they are in conflicts all the time. One day, Aandal discovers that Pounrasu and his uncle were, in fact, the culprits who forced Kottaisaamy to marry her. They managed to cancel her marriage because Pounrasu wanted to marry Nagamani. Aandal eventually promises Pounrasu to put together Nagamani and him. Meantime, his uncle kills Aandal.

The rest of the story is about what happens to Pounrasu and Nagamani.

== Cast ==
- Napoleon as Kottaisaamy
- Vineeth as Pounrasu
- Khushbu as Aandal
- Ravali as Nagamani
- Vivek as Veeramani
- Senthil as Chinnayya
- Manivannan as Nagamani's father
- Kovai Sarala as Nagamani's mother
- Manorama
- Vadivukkarasi
- Dhamu
- Nambirajan as Sankarapandian
- Karikalan
- Kumarasesan

== Production ==
The film was initially titled Eera Kaathu. Devayani's refusal to be part of the project meant that Ravali was signed.

== Soundtrack ==
The soundtrack was composed by Ilaiyaraaja, with lyrics written by Kasthuri Raja.

Song	Singer(s)	Duration
"Aayiram Kodi"	Hariharan	4:53
"Ethanai Manikku"	Arunmozhi, Anuradha Sriram	4:51
"Kuchanooru"	Pushpavanam Kuppusamy, Anitha Kuppusamy	5:03
"Mamarathula"	P. Unnikrishnan, Bhavatharini	4:45
"Manasirukka Manasirukka"	Pushpavanam Kuppusamy, Swarnalatha	5:20
"Un Kendakaalu"	Mano, Swarnalatha	4:46
"Vaanampaartha"	Ilaiyaraaja	3:54

== Reception ==
Indiainfo wrote, "Naploean sleepwalks through a role that he has done several times. Vineeth’s role evokes disgust instead of sympathy. Ravali tries her best to look the impish village belle but fails. Illayaraja’s music and Khushboo are the only two good things about the movie. Vivek does provide some comedy, but only in the first half. Rajarajam’s camerawork is average". K. N. Vijiyan of New Straits Times wrote the film "should appeal to those who cannot have enough of village subject, complete with all the family-in-fighting that seems so integral with the story".
