= Anitha Kuppusamy =

- Genres: Tamil Folk Art, Carnatic
- Occupations: Singer, musician, author

Anitha Kuppusamy is a Tamil folk and Carnatic singer, and television host known for her 'Naatupura Pattu', a Tamil folk art. Anitha aspired to become a singer from a young age. Apart from singing, Anitha has appeared as a judge on several television reality shows. Anitha has written few books on cookery and appeared in cookery shows on TV.

== Biography ==
Anitha was born Harpyari in Mettupalayam. She was interested in music and singing from her childhood and managed to convince her family to pursue her career as singer. She gained B.A. in music at Avinashi Lingam College, Coimbatore. Anitha joined the University of Madras, Chennai and obtained M.A in Carnatic music.

She met Pushpavanam Kuppusamy, a fellow student at University of Madras, and they started singing together in various competitions and concerts. Eventually the couple got married. She learnt "Nattupura Pattu", a Tamil folk art, from her husband Pushpavanam Kuppusamy.

== Career ==
Anitha's main focus was on "Nattupura Pattu", a Tamil folk art. Along with her husband Pushpavanam Kuppusamy she has performed around 3,000 concerts in India and overseas.

Anitha incorporated social messages in her singing to create awareness specially about AIDS, dowry, smoking, drinking, female infanticide, child labour, importance of education for girls, and breast feeding.

Earlier Anitha's aim was to become a mainstream playback singer. But due to her frequent traveling for concerts she could not concentrate on playback singing.

== Works ==
=== Folk albums ===
- Mannu Manakkadhu
- Mann Vaasam
- Mann Osai
- Karisal Mann
- Solam Vedhaikkayile
- Meham Karukkudhadi
- Kalathu Medu
- Urkkuruvi
- Gramathu Geetham
- Kattumall
- Adiyathi Dance Dance
- Othaiyadippadhaiyile
- Thanjavooru Manneduthu
- Nattuppura Manam

== Filmography ==
=== As Playback singer ===
Film	Song	Music director	Co-singer(s)
Valli Vara Pora	"Ponnu Romba Joruthan"	K. S. Mani Oli	Pushpavanam Kuppusamy
Arasiyal	"Arasiyal Arasiyal"	Vidyasagar	Pushpavanam Kuppusamy
Karisakattu Poove	"Kuchanooru"	Ilaiyaraaja	Pushpavanam Kuppusamy

== Personal life ==
Anitha is married to Pushpavanam Kuppusamy who is also a singer. She joined the All India Anna Dravida Munnetra Kazhagam political party in September 2013.
