= Kuṟiñcippāṭṭu =

Ancient Tamil poem

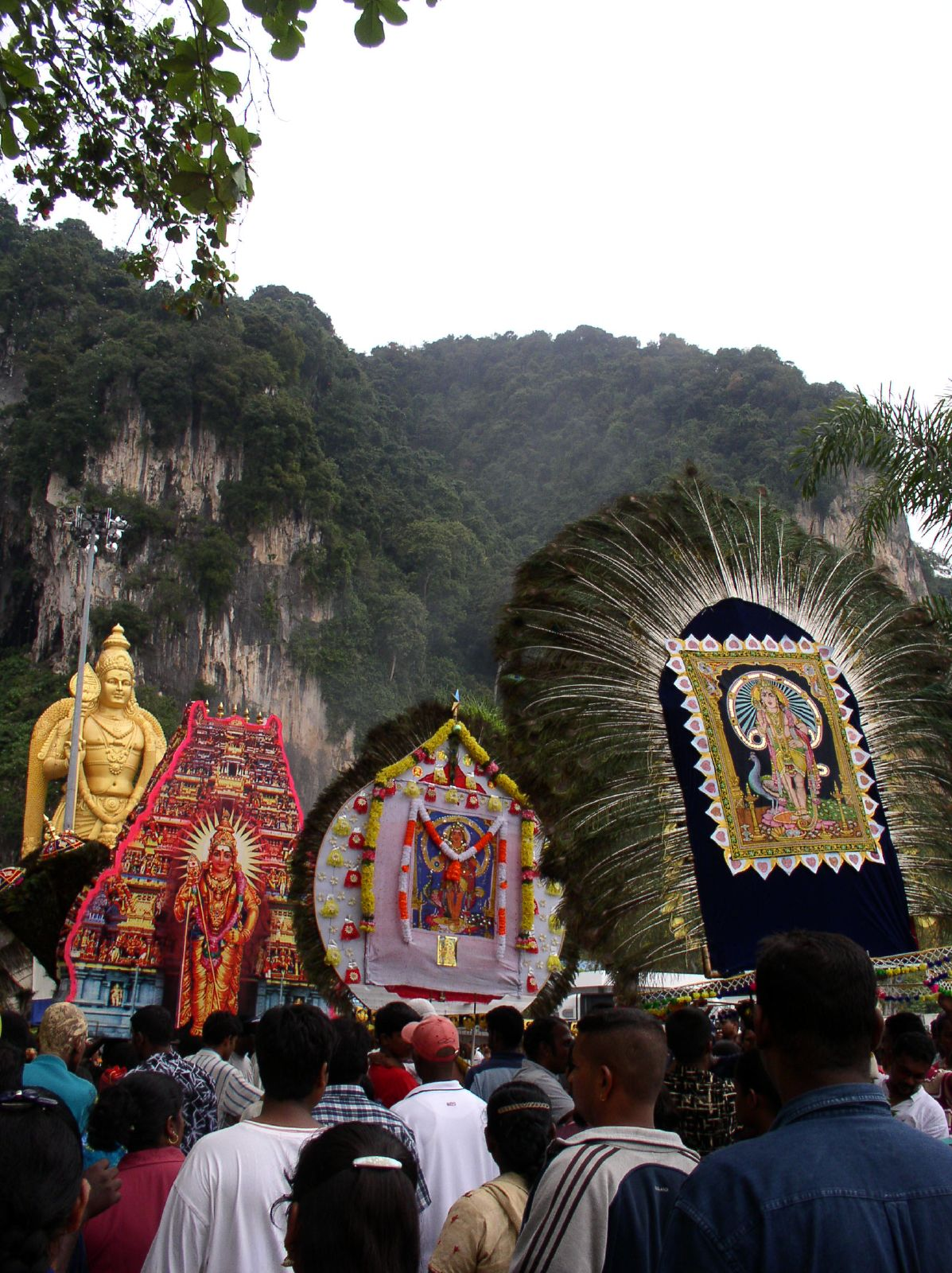
The Text has mentions of Muruga and worshiped by many.

Kuṟiñcippāṭṭu (Tamil: குறிஞ்சிப்பாட்டு, lit. 'the song of the mountains'), also called the Kurinchipattu or Perumkurinchi, is an ancient Tamil poem in the Sangam literature genre. It is a story about premarital love. Authored by Kapilar, it is the eighth poem in the Pattuppāṭṭu anthology. The poem is generally dated to the classical period (2nd- to 3rd-century CE).

The Kurincippattu poem has 261 lines in akaval meter. It has 1,440 words, of which at least 19 are Sanskrit loan words. The underlying story is about a hill-tribe chieftain who sees a girl and falls in love at first sight. She falls for him too. Her foster-sister senses what is going on, and she arranges them to meet to enjoy each other in "beautiful groves of the forest". Overwhelmed by the experience of first love, her behavior at home changes. Her parents see the strangeness and suspect something is going on. They do not guess there is a lover involved but presume possession by spirits. They invite exorcists to treat their daughter. Her foster-sister intervenes and tells them the entire story, along with how the young man saved her life twice recently, once from drowning and another from a charging elephant. The parents feel that the young man would make a good husband, so they consent to their marriage. They did not approve of their premarital illicit love, but the love poem describes how the boy kept seeing the girl every night, and how she worried about her lover's journey through the forest full of danger and wildlife as he came to meet her.

The poem is well written but is unusual in parts. For example, right as the love story is developing, it digresses into reciting a catalog of 99 mountain flowers in lines 61 to 95, those found in the Kurinci region. To some scholars, this appears to be an insertion into the original love story. Other scholars state that this poem may have had multiple purposes and served as a model with embedded information for other bards as they composed poems for their audience. This is confirmed in other early Tamil poems where catalogs of information about flora, fauna, donors and other topics were embedded in the poem in a metric form. Yet other scholars see it, along with certain structural features of the Kurincippattu as reasons to suspect a "near-forgery committed upon a famous bard", states Zvelebil.

The poem was dedicated to king Prahattan from north India, and to teach him principles of Tamil poetry. It has significant details about clothing, jewelry, mountain farmers guarding their crops from elephants and other wildlife, weapons chieftains carried, musical instruments, warrior god Murugan, priests making their evening devotions, and other cultural information about ancient Tamil Nadu. The poem presents courtship practices of the ancient era, yet also describes the ethical questions and "possible wicked rumors" the maiden – and later the man – worries about as she begins and continues her premarital love affair. Their discussions and then an agreement to marry each other is a part of this love poem.

== See also ==
- Eighteen Greater Texts
- Sangam literature
