= Pancha Marapu =

Lomg lost 10th century Tamil manuscript on music theory

Pancha Marapu (Tamil: பஞ்சமரபு pañcamarapu) is a 10th-century Tamil treatise on musical theory, written by Aṟivaṉār. The work is one of the isaittamiḻ texts referred to in Atiyarkkunallar's commentary on the Silappadhikaram. There is also a view it predates silappadikaram as silappadikaram refers to it ; so is devara pann methodology. Although it was long believed to be lost, a manuscript was discovered in the latter half of the twentieth century, and partially published in 1973. A revised edition has since been published.

The text deals with the music, musical instruments and percussion instruments (muḻavu) of that period, and enumerates nine divisions of Tamil music, namely, cindu, cavalai, tiripatai, camapātaviruttam, centuṟai, veṇṭuṟai, peruntēvappāṇi, ciruntēvappāṇi, and vaṇṇam.
