= Pushpavanam Kuppusamy =

- Born: Kuppusamy
- Origin: Tamil Nadu, India
- Genres: Tamil Folk Art, Playback singing
- Occupations: Musician, composer, author

Pushpavanam Kuppusamy is a Tamil folk singer, playback singer, lyricist, writer and music composer. He has been credited for reviving the Naatupura Paatu, a type of Tamil folk art. Together with his wife Anitha Kuppusamy, he has conducted several concerts of Tamil folk songs. The couple has jointly brought out several albums of authentic Tamil folk music. He has also written books on Tamil folk songs. He appears on TV channels like Sun TV, Vijay TV, and Makkal TV, performing musical shows. He is a recipient of the Kalaimamani award from the Government of Tamil Nadu.

== Biography ==
Kuppusamy studied at Madras University and gained M.A., M.Phil., and a Ph.D. in music. He received his Ph.D. from Queen Mary's College, Chennai. Sathyabhama University gave an Honorary Doctorate to Kuppusamy for his contribution to music.

Along with his wife, he has performed around 3000 shows in India and abroad. He is known for his incorporation of social messages through his music.

Kuppusamy has sung film songs for many popular music directors, including Ilaiyaraaja, Vidyasagar, Yuvan Shankar Raja, Devi Sri Prasad, and G. V. Prakash Kumar.

Kuppusamy is one of the seasonal judges in Vijay TV hosted Airtel Super Singer and Airtel Super Singer Junior.

He is known for his audio casettes of tarkka paattu, a category of Tamil folk song.

== Personal life ==
Kuppusamy hails from a Tamil family from Nagapattinam district Vedaranyam. He did his schooling at Vedaranyam S.K.S Government higher secondary School. He is married to Anitha Kuppusamy who is also a singer.

== Works ==
=== Folk albums ===
- Mannu Manakkadhu song
- Mann Vaasam
- Mann Osai
- Karisal Mann
- Solam Vedhaikkayile
- Meham Karukkudhadi
- Kalathu Medu
- Urkkuruvi
- Gramathu Geetham
- Kattumalli
- Adiyathi Dance Dance
- Othaiyadippadhaiyile
- Thanjavooru Manneduthu
- Nattuppura Manam

=== Devotional albums ===
- Anjumalai Azhagan
- Swamiye
- Aatha Vaara
- Kandhan Thiruneeru
- Megam Karukuthadi
- Ayyanin Periya Paathai
- Antha varaar ayyappa

=== Books ===
- Makkalisaippadalgal
- Siruvar Padalgal
- Pazhamozhikkadhaigal Volume 1 & 2
- Vidukadhaigal
- Kuzhandhaippadalgal Volume 1

== Filmography ==
=== As playback singer ===
Film songs

Year	Film	Song	Music director	Co-singer(s)
1995	Valli Vara Pora	"Ponnu Romba Joruthan"	K. S. Mani Oli	Anitha Kuppusamy
1997	Arasiyal	"Arasiyal Arasiyal"	Vidyasagar	Anitha Kuppusamy
1998	Oru Maravathoor Kanavu (Malayalam)	"Sundariye Sundariye"	Vidyasagar	K. J. Yesudas, Sujatha
1998	Desiya Geetham	"Mannana Poranthavuga"	Ilaiyaraaja	
1998	Kadhal Kavithai	"Aalana Naal Mudhala"	Ilaiyaraaja	Sowmya Raoh
1999	Edhirum Pudhirum	"Kathu Pasanga"	Vidyasagar	Malaysia Vasudevan, Anuradha Sriram
1999	Edhirum Pudhirum	"Thottu Thottu Pesum"	Vidyasagar	Swarnalatha
2000	Karisakattu Poove	"Manasirukka Manasirukka"	Ilaiyaraaja	Swarnalatha
2000	Karisakattu Poove	"Kuchanooru"	Ilaiyaraaja	Anitha Kuppusamy
2002	Azhagi	"Kuruvi Kodanja"	Ilaiyaraaja	Swarnalatha
2002	Pesadha Kannum Pesume	"Jodipotta"	Bharani	Anuradha Sriram
2002	Ramanaa	"Alli Mudicha"	Ilaiyaraaja	Swarnalatha
2002	Style	"Pottu Eduthu"	Bharani	Swarnalatha
2004	Thendral	"Putham Puthu Paatu"	Vidyasagar	
2004	Perazhagan	"Kadhalukku"	Yuvan Shankar Raja	Sri Vardhini
2004	Sullan	"Adho Varaa"	Vidyasagar	Harini
2004	Venky (Telugu)	"Gongoora Thottakada"	Devi Sri Prasad	Kalpana
2004	Madhurey	"Varanda Varanda"	Vidyasagar	
2005	Bhadra (Telugu)	"Yerrakokka"	Devi Sri Prasad	
2005	Thirupaachi	"Appan Panna"	Dhina	Anuradha Sriram
2005	Maayavi	"Kaathadi Pole"	Devi Sri Prasad	Kalpana
2005	6'2	"Pottuthakka"	D.Imaan	
2005	February 14	"Othaiya Rettaiya"	Bharadwaj	
2006	Azhagai Irukkirai Bayamai Irukkirathu	"Kaadhalai Pirippadhu"	Yuvan Shankar Raja	Yuvan Shankar Raja
2006	Thirupathi	"Keerai Vedhaippom"	Bharadwaj	
2007	Agaram	"Tappu Egirippogum"	Yuvan Shankar Raja	Tippu
2008	Thiruvannamalai	"Namma Nadai"	Srikanth Deva	
2011	Nanjupuram	"Oorula Unakoru Medai"	Raaghav	
2012	Kazhugu	"Vaadi Vaadi"	Yuvan Shankar Raja	SuVi
2012	Saguni	"Annachi Ammachi"	G. V. Prakash Kumar	Maya Manikandan
2013	Madha Yaanai Koottam	"Kombu Oothi"	N. R. Raghunanthan	Anand Aravindakshan
2014	Veeram	"Jing Chikka Jing Chikka"	Devi Sri Prasad	Magizhini Manimaaran
2015	Trisha Illana Nayanthara	"Trisha Illana Nayanthara"	G.V. Prakash Kumar	Arunraja Kamaraj
2023	Jawan	"Kalki Theme"	Anirudh Ravichander	Mahalingam
2025	Idli Kadai	"Ethana Saami"	G. V. Prakash Kumar	

Serial songs

Serials	Song	Music director	Co-singer(s)
Chinna Pappa Periya Pappa	"Chinna Pappa"	Dhina	
Velan		Jonson	

=== As actor ===
Year	Film	Director
2002	Solla Marantha Kathai	Thangar Bachan
2013	Velmurugan Borewells	M.P.Gobi

== Awards ==
- Kalaimamani ( Government of Tamil Nadu)
