= Malaipaṭukaṭām =

Ancient Tamil poem

Malaipaṭukaṭām (Tamil: மலைபடுகடாம்) is an ancient Tamil poem in the Pattuppāṭṭu anthology of the Sangam literature. Authored by Perunkunrur Perunkausikanar who is considered as a Brahmin due to his name Kausikanar which denotes the Vedic Rishi Kaushika, it consists of 583 lines according to Kamil Zvelebil (Note: Zvelebil states it has 583 lines. m Other scholars such as Fred Clothey state that the Malaipaṭukaṭām has many more lines. According to Chellaih, the poem has 763 lines.) lines that describe the nature scenes, the people and the culture of mountain countryside under king Nannan. The poem is dated approximately to 210 CE by Kamil Zvelebil – a Tamil literature scholar. The lengthy poem mentions the Hindu god Maha Vishnu primarily. Maha Vishnu was considered as the "Supreme Deity" in the poem and worshiped by many saints and kings. It also mentions the goddess of wealth, Lakshmi in lines 463–464 and the "goddess who sits enthroned on Maha Vishnus chest". There are also mentions where the king is looking similar to the god Murugan – the god of war (line 651).

The title of the poem Malaipatukatam, also spelled Malaipadukadam, is found in lines 347–348 of the poem in the context of "roaring elephants in rut". The title has been interpreted in two ways. Some scholars translate it as "the secretion oozing from the mountains", while others as "the sound of katam which arises in the mountains". Either is metonymically interpreted as "the Echo of the Mountains". The poem is also known as Kūttarāṟṟupaṭai (Kuttararruppatai), lit. "Guide to the Dancing Minstrels", a title that suggests that it is an arruppatai-genre poem.

The Malaipatukatam is known for its similes, some of which are also found in other Sangam poems. It paints a vivid picture of the hilly region (near Chengam, then called Chenkama), the people, the troupes of actors and their musical instruments. The poem describes the beauty of the female singers and dancers. Other lines present the valor of virtues king Nannan. His capital city is described, along with a long catalog-like description of the birds, animals, trees, flowers, and fruits found in the hilly kingdom.

The guide outlines some natural dangers faced by troupes as they travel from one performance site to another, and the generous hospitality they will receive from villagers along their way. It mentions servings of alcohol made from rice that is aged in bamboos, a meal of rice, buttermilk, avarai beans and tamarind gravy. A few lines in the Malaipatukatam mention the shepherds, the fishermen and the farmers along the Cheyyar River (Seyaru). The women in these regions, states the poem, sing songs as they pound and husk the grains.

== See also ==
- Chera dynasty
- Sangam literature
