= Lakshmi Holmström =

Indian-British writer and translator (1935–2016)

Lakshmi Holmström MBE
- Holmström at 2013 Jaipur Literature Festival
- Born: 1 June 1935; Salem, Madras Presidency, British India (now in Tamil Nadu, India)
- Died: 6 May 2016 (aged 80); Norwich, England, United Kingdom
- Education: University of Oxford; University of Madras
- Occupations: Author, translator in English
- Writing career
- Period: 1973–2016
- Genre: Tamil – English translation
- Subjects: Women, classical and contemporary literature
- Notable works: Sangati (trans.); Karukku (trans.); In a Forest, A Deer

Lakshmi Holmström MBE (1 June 1935 – 6 May 2016) was an Indian-British writer, literary critic, and translator of Tamil fiction into English. Her most prominent works were her translations of short stories and novels by contemporary writers in Tamil, such as Mauni, Pudhumaipithan, Ashoka Mitran, Sundara Ramasami, C. S. Lakshmi, Bama, and Imayam.

== Education ==
Born in Salem, Tamil Nadu, in 1935, to Paul David Devanandan and Hannah (nee Amaruvati) as the second daughter, Lakshmi lost her mother, when she was barely two years old. Her father re-married. Lakshmi received her undergraduate degree in English literature from the University of Madras and her postgraduate degree from University of Oxford. Her postgraduate work was on the work of R. K. Narayan.

== Career ==
She settled in the United Kingdom and she was the founder-trustee of SALIDAA (South Asian Diaspora Literature and Arts Archive) – an organisation archiving the work of British writers and artists of South Asian origin.

From 2003 to 2006 she was a Fellow of The Royal Literary Fund at University of East Anglia in Norwich, Norfolk, England.

She was appointed Member of the Order of the British Empire (MBE) in 2011 for services to literature.

== Death ==
She died of cancer on 6 May 2016 in Norwich, aged 80.

== Bibliography ==
Year	Title	Genre	Role	Publisher
1973	Indian Fiction in English: the Novels of R. K. Narayan	Criticism	Author	Writers Workshop, Calcutta
1990	The Inner Courtyard: Short Stories by Indian Women	Short story anthology	Editor	Virago Press, London
1992	A Purple Sea (Original author: Ambai)	Short story anthology	Translator	Affiliated East-West Press
1994	Writing from India: Figures in a Landscape		Editor	Cambridge University Press
1996	Silappadikaram and Manimekalai (illustrated)	Epics	Translator	Orient Blackswan
2000	Karukku (Original author: Bama)	Novel	Translator	Oxford University Press
2001	Beasts of Burden (Original author: Imayam )	Novel	Translator	Manas
2001	Waves: An Anthology of Fiction and Poetry Translated from Tamil	Anthology	Editor	Manas
2002	My father's Friend (Original author: Ashokamitran)	Anthology	Translator	Sahitya Akademi
2003	Pudumaippittan: Fictions	Anthology	Translator	Katha, Chennai
2003	That's It But (Original author: Sundara Ramaswamy)	Short fiction	Translator	Katha, Chennai
2004	Mauni: A Writers' Writer	Criticism	Author	Katha, Chennai
2004	Waterness (Original author: Na Muthuswamy - Neermai )	Short story anthology	Translator	Katha, Chennai
2005	Sangati (Original author: Bama)	Novel	Translator	Oxford University Press
2005	Clarinda, a Historical Novel (Original author: A. Madhaviah)	Novel	Translator	Sahitya Akademi
2006	In A Forest, A Deer: Stories (Original author: Ambai)	Short story anthology	Translator	Katha, Chennai
2009	The Hour Past Midnight (Original author: Salma)	Novel	Translator	Zubaan
2009	The Penguin Book of Tamil Poetry: The rapids of a great river	Poetry anthology	Editor-translator	Penguin Books
2012	A Second Sunrise (Original author: Cheran Rudramoorthy)	Poetry anthology	Translator (with Sascha Ebeling)	Navayana

== Awards ==
- 2000 Crossword Book Award in the Indian language fiction translation category for Karukku by Bama
- 2006 Crossword Book Award in the Indian language fiction translation category for In a Forest, A Deer by C. S. Lakshmi
- 2007 Iyal Virudhu Lifetime Achievement Award given by The Tamil Literary Garden, Canada
- 2015 Crossword Book Award in the Indian language fiction translation category for Children, Women, Men by Sundara Ramaswamy
- 2016 The A.K. Ramanujan Book Prize for translation from a South Asian language, awarded by the Association for Asian Studies for Children, Women and Men, originally published as Kuzhandaigal, Pengal, Aangal by Sundara Ramaswamy, Penguin Books India
