= S. Tamilselvan =

Indian writer and literary critic (born 1954)

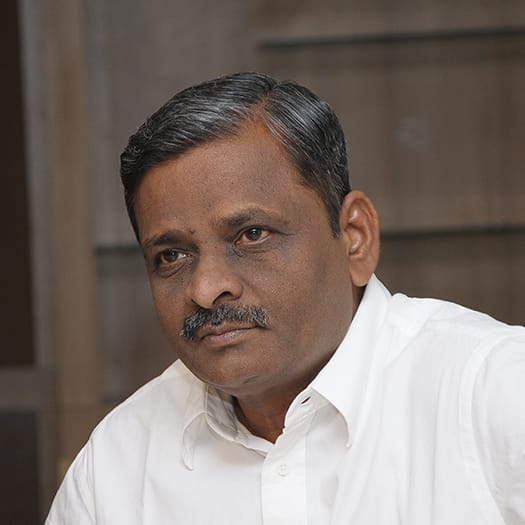
- Born: 27 May 1954 (age 72); Nagalapuram, Thoothukudi district, Tamil Nadu
- Occupations: Writer, Literary criticism
- Spouse: R. Vellathai
- Children: 1
- Relatives: Konangi and Murugabhoopathy (brothers)
- Writing career
- Language: Tamil
- Genres: Short story, novel, novella
- Subject: Literature
- Notable works: Veyilotu Potu, Tamizh Sirukathaiyin Thadankal
- Notable awards: Sahitya Akademi Award (2025)

S. Tamilselvan is a Tamil language writer and literary critic from Tamilnadu. He has written more than fifty books, including essays, short stories, and children's literature, on a variety of subjects including literature, culture, education, science, feminism, politics, and history. He received the 2025 Sahitya Akademi Award in the Literary Criticism category for his work Tamizh Sirukathaiyin Thadankal, critically analyzes Tamil short stories from different generations.

== Biography ==
S. Tamilselvan was born on 27 May 1954 in Nagalapuram, Thoothukudi district of Tamil Nadu. His grandfather, Madhurakavi Bhaskara Das, was a playwright and the mentor of M. S. Subbulakshmi, S. G. Kittappa, and K. B. Sundarambal, and his father M. S. Shanmugam was a writer, who wrote on various journals of the Dravidian movement. His mother is Saraswathi. Writer Konangi and playwright Murugabhoopathy are Tamilselvan's brothers.

Tamilselvan grew up in Nenmeni Mettupatti, Virudhunagar district and completed his schooling. He completed his college studies at Kovilpatti. Born into a family of writers, he was drawn to reading and later to writing at an early age. His first poem was published in the small magazine Neelakkuuil. His first short story appeared in the journal Thamarai.

In early years Tamilselvan was attracted to Gandhian ideology. He also stated that the character Aravindan of the famous Tamil novel "Kurinjimalar" written by Na. Parthasarathy was his role model. Inspired by the character’s Gandhian values and patriotic spirit, Tamilselvan even used to dress like him.

Inspired by Gandhism and patriotism, he joined the Indian army. There he started reading English books. Poems by Kamala Das, novels by Pritish Nandy, Shasti Pratha and Bharati Mukherjee were his favorites that time.

Unable to adapt to the mechanized discipline of the army, he returned home after a few years and settled in Kovilpatti. At that time, Kovilpatti was the home of many left-wing progressive literary youth, including well-known writers. He too became one of them. He started writing extreme left-wing poetry, and also ran a manuscript magazine called Kizhakku.

He joined the postal service as an employee, and attracted towards the trade union activism. Subsequently, he joined the 'Tamil Nadu Murpokku Ezhuthalar Kalaignargal Sangam' (TMMS) and later became its state president.

=== Personal life ===
Tamilselvan is currently living in Sivakasi with his wife R. Vellathai, a retired Headmaster. His son Siddharth lives in Chennai.

== Career ==
Initially working in the Postal Department, Tamilselvan later joined the Indian Army and served on the India-China border. Later, he left the army and rejoined the Postal Department.

Also a left-wing thinker affiliated with the Communist Party of India (Marxist), S. Tamilselvan also served as the state secretary and president of the progressive writers and artistes association in the state called 'Tamil Nadu Murpokku Ezhuthalar Kalaignargal Sangam' (TMMS). He played a major role in expanding the reach of the association to all corners of the state, thereby attracting a large number of youth to the organization.

He also participated in the Arivoli (meaning:Light of Knowledge) movement, traveling from village to village to create awareness about the importance of education. For this, Tamilselvan wrote several pamphlets and composed several songs. Eventually, he voluntarily retired from his position in the Postal Department to focus more on these movements.

Tamilselvan also served as the editor of the literary magazine Semmalar.

== Contributions ==
Tamilselvan has written more than 50 books, including essays, short stories, and children's literature, on a variety of subjects including literature, culture, education, science, feminism, politics, and history. His works range from small pamphlets of about 16 pages to large volumes of up to 1,000 pages.

Tamilselvan's first collection of short stories, Veilode Poi, was released in 1984. The short story Veilode Poi, included in that collection, was adapted into film by film director Sasi under the title Poo. For that film, he was awarded the Tamil Nadu Government's Award for Best Story for Film.

As of 2024, of the 52 books of Tamilselvan, apart from Iruttu Ennakku Padukku (Vasal Publishing), Peshatha Peschelam (Uyirumai Publishing), Modeyaman Kaatruyum Isivana Kadalalaiyum (Collection of Stories, Thamizhini Publishing) and Naan Pesha Paramundu (Vamsi Publishing), the other books that have been published by Bharathi Puthakalayam. Some of his books like Namakhana Kutumbam [meaning:Our family] and Arasiyal Enak Pudikum [meaning: I like politics] have seen 27 editions so far. Both these books have sold several lakh copies.

Namakhana Kutumbam [meaning:Our family] is a book that has scientifically explained the historical facts about the origin, development and present state of the family system. The series Esappatu written by him in the daily Hindu Tamil Vekti talks about interactions between women and our society. The book Theivam Saatchi [meaning: God is the witness] tells the stories of more than 60 women who are worshiped as folk goddesses in Tamil land. The book Sappatu Ramanin Ninaivalikal covers the recipe, taste and variety, starting from the traditional Tamil cuisine to the present-day paratha. But this is not a collection of recipe; The book says that men taking up cooking is the first step in trying to free women.

His work Tamizh Sirukathaiyin Thadankal [meaning:Traces of the Tamil Short Story] that focus on the history of Tamil short stories, critically analyzes Tamil short stories from V. V. S. Iyer's Kulthankarai Arasamaram, which is widely considered to be the first short story in Tamil. The book classifies Tamil short stories into 6 main categories manikodi-writing, mass magazines, left-wing thought, Dravidian movement, Dalit and women writers. In this book, he compares the works of 57 important short story writers including Pudhumaipithan, K. P. Rajagopalan, Jayakanthan and K. Rajanarayanan with their social backgrounds. Not just a literary review, this book conveys to the readers the political and economic environment of the time when a work was created.

The book Kettathal Solla Nerinthath includes a collection of interviews with him conducted by journalists and writers. He notes that in response to the questions asked of him, he simply presented the thoughts that came to him at those particular moments. His book Zindabad Zindabad, describe a trade unionist's experience in politics.

The series Pesatha Pachellam, which he wrote in 'Uiirmai' magazine, has been published as a book with the same title. In this book, in a very emotional mood, he describes the way his life experiences interacted with many of his fellow human beings who have passed away. The book Nan Pesa Virumbikiren [meaning:I want to talk] features poetic essays on noted artistic figures like Frida Kahlo, Ingrid Bergman, Paul Gauguin, Egon Schiele, and Liv Ullmann. These articles were serially published in the quarterly magazine 'Puthuvisai'.

He has also published a 1000 page two-volume history of the communist movementand empowerment of poor peasants in Thanjavur district, titled Thiruppiaditha Varalaru.

== Awards and honors ==
Tamilselvan received the 2025 Sahitya Akademi Award in the Literary Criticism category for his work "Tamizh Sirukathaiyin Thadankal". He has also been honoured with the Sahitya Akademi Award for his works like Veyilodu Poyi and Valin Solani. Best Story Award by the Tamil Nadu Government Film Corporation.

== See also ==
- List of Sahitya Akademi Award winners for Tamil
- List of Indian writers
- List of Tamil-language writers
