= Imayam (writer) =

Tamil novelist from Chennai, India (born 1964)

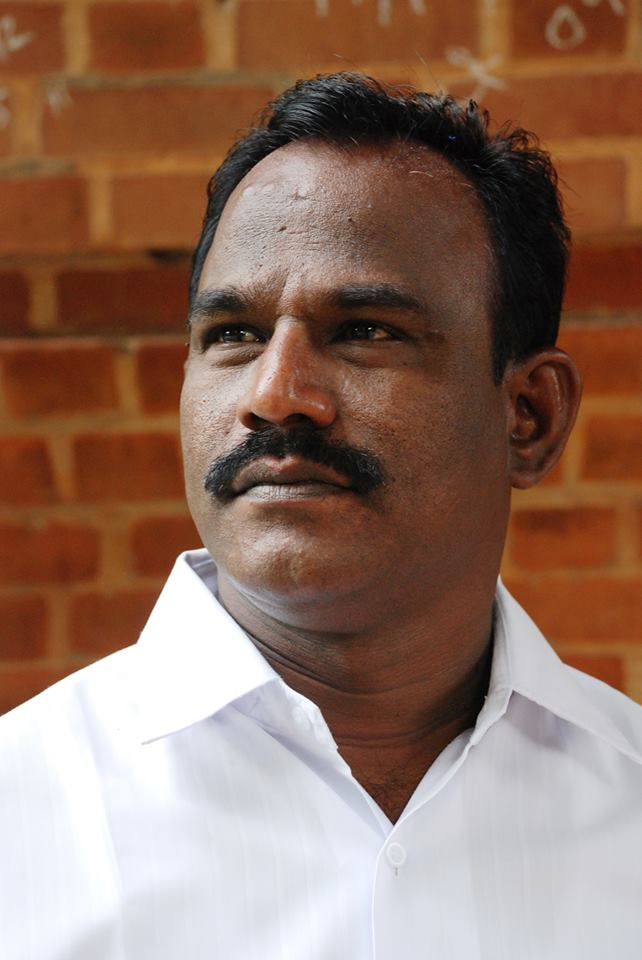
- Born: V. Annamalai; 10 March 1964 (age 62); Kazhudur, South Arcot District, Madras State (now Cuddalore District, Tamil Nadu), India
- Occupation: School Teacher
- Spouse: Pushpavalli (m. 1997)
- Writing career
- Pen name: Imayam
- Language: Tamil
- Period: 1990–present
- Genres: Short story, novel, novella
- Subject: Literature
- Notable awards: Sahitya Akademi Award (2020)
- Website: writerimayam.com

Imayam (pen name of V. Annamalai) is an Indian Tamil-language novelist from Chennai, Tamil Nadu. He has ten novels, nine short story collections and a novella to his credit. Widely acknowledged for his realist mode of writing, his stories are known for their incisive exploration of societal intricacies. Closely associated with the Dravidian Movement and its politics, he is considered as one of the leading writers from South India. He is the recipient of the honorary Sahitya Akademi Award for his novel Selladha Panam in 2020. He is also the first Tamil writer to receive the Kuvempu Rashtriya Puraskar National Award (2022) for bringing new sensibilites to Tamil literature through his writings. Noting the writer's proclivity to Dravidian ideals, the Tamil Nadu chief minister M.K.Stalin called him "an ideologue donned in black and red". He lauded Imayam calling him a "proactive writer" in the Dravidian movement.

Agni Aksra Award, the Tamil Nadu Progressive Writers Association Award, the N.L.C. Award, and the Thamizh Thendral Thiru.V.Ka. Award from the state government of Tamil Nadu are bestowed upon him for his literary contributions that captures the realities around him, about Dalits, caste, patriarchy, women, injustice and oppression. He has been honored by the governments of Kerala, Tamil Nadu and India for his literary legacy that spans around almost three decades.

== Early life and family ==
He was born on 10 March 1964 into a peasant family in Kazhudur, a village in Tittakudi taluk of present-day Cuddalore district, Tamil Nadu. He had his college education at Periyar E.V.R. College. Tiruchirappalli. It was S. Albert, a Professor from Trichy who 'opened the door to the world' for him. He later moved to Vriddhachalam and continued his writing.

He is married to Pushpavalli and has two sons - Kathiravan Annamalai and Tamilselvan Annamalai. He is the younger brother of Labour Welfare and Skill Development Minister of Tamil Nadu.

== Works ==
Rooted in the Dravidian literary tradition, Imayam's works frequently highlight the challenges and negative influence of caste in the lives of everyday people living in the northern coastal districts of Tamil Nadu. Imayam says that he draws his stories from his life. “I write the stories of those who live with me in my family, my neighbourhood, my street, my village. I write the stories they told me, the stories I see, the stories I have heard, the stories I live. I write my life; I write how I live.”

=== Koveru Kazhudaigal ===
Koveru Kazhudhaigal is about a family of Dalit launderers who wash the clothes of other Dalit people, receiving grain and other food in return. The novel is constructed between two journeys: a pilgrimage of hope at the beginning; a routine trip to the washing pool in drudgery and despair in the end. Imayam invents for the protagonist Arokkyam a particular spoken style; often relying on a string of related exclamations, it is very similar to a formal lament. He presents an ebullient mix of the past, present and future in his works. He was barely 18 when he finished the first draft of the novel. About Koveru Kazhudaigal. the writer Sundara Ramasamy wrote "There is no novel that equals this one in the last 100 years of Tamil writing."

Koveru Kazhudhaigal won the Agni Aksara Award from the Tamil Nadu Progressive Writers' Forum (1994), the Amudhan Adigal Ilakkiya Award for Literature (1998) and was honored with a state award.

The English translation of Koveru Kazhudaigal. appeared as 'Beasts of Burden' in 2001. It was translated into English again in 2006, and was also translated into Malayalam. In an introduction to Beasts of Burden, Imayam writes that

"The world is an ocean, in which concepts and theories are like ships which appear and disappear. My works were not composed with the comfort offered by these ships, but written from within the sea and by looking at its vastness." The result is that this story, rooted in specificities of a certain experience, has a resounding universality: it is simply about how life goes on.

Koveru Kazhuthaigal gives us a detailed picture of a lifestyle that has now passed: that there is no supposition that the lifestyles of the upper castes (vegetarianism, Brahminic rituals, etc.) are, or ought to be, the norm. Yet it is not even the rich ethnographic detail that makes the book so valuable, but the insight it gives us into the life of the woman, Arokkyam, on the margins of society and poised between Hindu ritual and Christian devotion. Arokkyam means 'good health', 'well-being'; Savuri is the Tamil version of Xavier.

The novel is constructed on two journeys: a pilgrimage of hope at the beginning; a routine trip to the washing pool in drudgery and despair at the end. Between these, it is signposted by rites of passage which give a sense of cyclical time, but also by landmarks of historical, linear time. This climate of time and change is important to the novel whose primary theme is Arokkyam's dilemma within changing systems of belief about the self and society. First, there is the gradual commercialization of traditionally caste-linked functions. The village acquires a regular tailor and a laundryman with a box-iron, both of whom serve not only the village people, but the colony dwellers too, taking away the custom from the traditional washerman. Changing styles of dress contribute to this too, as men begin to wear shirts and trousers that need pressing rather than the traditional veshti wrapped about the waist. Both Arokkyam's sons move into more liberated worlds: her elder son, Josep, is persuaded by his wife to leave home and go into partnership with his brother-in-law to start a laundry business in town, while the younger, Peter, cannot understand why they do not go in for coolie work that would be paid in daily cash wages. At the same time as this loss in main livelihood, there is a steady decline and breakdown in the old caste prerogatives: the amount of grain that Arokkyam and Savuri were allocated by right at each household where they winnowed, dwindles to no more than a single scant tray; the head and intestines of the sacrificial twat which was traditionally the vannaan's by right begins to be auctioned. And the payment for all ritual services grows less and less; is often no more than a token.

Arokkyam has one main hope in coping with change: that the church will intervene in support of the old order, and appeal to the elders of the colony to keep up their caste obligations to their vannaan. The novel begins with a pilgrimage to the Church of Saint Anthony, which is a journey of hope. In fact when the church intervenes much later, it is with an offer which is totally unexpected: to take the youngest son Peter away, and train him to become a priest. In a beautifully developed central chapter, Arokkyam struggles with the anguish of her choices. The novel turns on this central dilemma.

The indomitable but suffering mother figure is a repeated image in Marathi dalit writing. She is often the sole breadwinner, sacrificing everything for the family. Namdeo Dhasal, Vaman Nimbalkar and Jyoti Lanjeswar have all written poems entitled, `Mother'. Gail Omvedt in her article in Nirappirikai (Nov. 1994) points to the mother figure in the poetry of dalit men as a continuing symbol of oppression, and also of struggle, sacrifice and sense of duty. But she adds that in all such portraits, 'These women did not challenge nor change greatly the nature of the functions and duties that were traditionally theirs.' The portrait of Arokkyam is in that tradition, but at the same time different from the symbolic archetype. She is not described objectively, but from within; from the perspective of her own dilemma, within the terms of her own anguish.

== Other works ==
Imayam's second novel, Arumugam, appeared in 1999 and was translated into French. Talking about this novel, noted writer Jeyamohan identifies the "folk poet" in Imayam. The folk narratives in the novels of Imayam make him a master of realism, he said. It is a tale of emotional bond between a child and his mother woven together with strings of love. It is the story of Arumugam, the little boy who grows up before his time, whose innocence is snatched away from him with his experiences. Originally written in Tamil, it has been translated into English by D Krishna Ayyar and published by Katha publishers. Manbaram, a collection of short stories, was published in 2002.

Sedal, a novel published in 2006, deals with a Dalit community whose women are designated as oracles. These women, appointed during droughts, fix the date for village festivals, perform koothu, participate in death rituals, and are not allowed a marital relationship. The novel tracts the life of Sedal, given over to the temple during the 1945-46 drought in Tamil Nadu, whose family leaves her behind and migrates to Sri Lanka. This novel is also translated into English.

=== Pethavan ===
Imayam's novella 'Pethavan' was first published in September 2012 in Uyirmai. In November 2012, it was published as a book through Oviya Publications TVS, Villupuram, being reprinted it five times in three months. Bharati Publications published the novella in February 2013 and has since sold more than 1,00,000 copies, reprinting it ten times. It has been translated into Malayalam and Telugu.

Pethavan preceded a similar real event that occurred in 2012 in Dharmapuri.

Set in rural Tamil Nadu, Pethavan is about a father, Pazhani, who has been ordered by the village panchayat to murder his daughter Bhakkiyam because she wants to marry a Dalit boy. The narrative is an unflinching account of the stress and ugliness that await those who dare to transcend caste borders. The animals in Pethavan stand apart from humans who seem to exist with no humanity. The bullock licks Pazhani's face and calms him down. He allows his face to be licked by the bullock, and slowly, his trembling stops. His dog hovers around Pazhani, concerned and unwilling to leave him in this trying moment.

About Pethavan, Ambai wrote

"I have cried when the father feeds his daughter, places her head on his chest, and hugs her. His language is abusive and abrasive throughout, but his words, when he bids Bhakkiyam goodbye and tells her to go live with her life, make not only his daughter and his future son in law, who speaks to him on the mobile, cry, but also the readers. When a story rises above the public image of the writer, it has truly succeeded in having an existence of its own that goes beyond the writer."

In an interview to Mint Lounge, Imayam opens up what forced him to write the story. He says “A friend introduced this person to me, casually remarking how he had sent his daughter with ‘our’ person. It sank in, slowly. I cannot stop thinking of the consequences, of what he had to face in the family, in the village. I was haunted by the thought. I had to write this story.”

=== Saavu Soru ===
The title story, Saavu Soru (Funeral Food), has a woman, whose daughter has eloped with a lower caste man, earning the wrath of the community. Though the men in the family have written her off by observing funeral rites for the girl and have even got their heads tonsured, the mother is looking for the girl. She wants to meet her and hand over the jewellery and other articles of the daughter.

In the story titled Varam, the girl elopes with a cousin – seen as a brother and hence an inappropriate match. The distressed mother gives vent to her feeling before the village god, saying that instead of committing such a “shameful” act, the daughter could have eloped with a lower caste man. She wants god to punish the girl who has married a ‘brother’. Most of the stories have female characters, who are harassed and distressed in a male-dominated subaltern society. The story Thirutupona Ponnu (Stolen Girl) is about an elderly spinster, who was kidnapped mistakenly soon after she attained puberty.

Though the girl was returned by those who kidnapped her without causing any harm, no man is ready to marry her after that. The story deals with the woman's pain and melancholy. The woman in Perasai (Greed) agrees to marry a man, whom she does not find that attractive, just because he works in a city. Her priority is to live in a house with a toilet.

Through the protagonist of Arasanga Pallikoodam (Government School), a daily wage earner, Imayam takes pot shots at the culture of celebrating cinema stars’ birthdays. She is summoned to the school because the teachers were peeved over her daughter distributing chocolates to her classmates on the occasion of her favourite film star's birthday. But the mother defends the girl and points to people tonsuring their heads when a film star was ill.

Taking a dig at the craze for admitting children to private schools, Imayam, in Raniyin Kathal, portrays the central character, Rani, as one who stoops to any level just to mobilise money for paying the fees of her children. In fact the stories reflect life in rural subaltern communities, presenting the trials and tribulations of the people realistically. One aspect of rustic life is the communication of the people with their local family deities.

=== Vaazhga Vaazhga ===
Imayam becomes important in the Tamil literary scene as he documents the folk dialects, folk idioms and registers of various sects of people. This is evident in all of his short stories, which stands as a storehouse of the cultural capital of Tamil Nadu. He was honoured with Sahitya Akademi for his 2018 novel Selladha Panam, which presents the case of a burnt woman, a victim of the political economy of the institution of marriage. His recent novel 'Vazhga Vazhga' (2020) deals with the plight of the commoners in huge political gatherings. He turns the limelight upon how the crowd is pulled to the meeting, the role played by caste in seating arrangements, the politics of those who have 'Power' and many more. Imayam executes Michel Foucault's statement 'Power is omnipresent' in this novel. This is the underlying element which holds the narrative of the novel together. There is a demarcation between those who have the power and those who are powerless in the novel. The novel is full of dichotomies - Powerful / powerless, Men / women, high caste / low caste. Imayam plays with these dichotomies through his dialogic form thereby bringing up the brutal hierarchical system of the society.

=== Selladha Panam ===
Selladha Panam is his fifth novel published in 2018. It is essentially about a woman facing violence at the hands of the man she had fallen in love with and married. “They have two children but the woman sets herself on fire over a family dispute,” he says. The story does not stop with talking about the incompatibility in their marriage, it goes on to capture life at a fire ward in a hospital like Pondicherry's JIPMER, about how flesh falls in pieces from burnt bodies, about staff carefully dressing the wounds, about outpouring of emotions, about the different kinds of stories behind the decisions... “Why is it that we hardly come across a man who sets himself on fire even if he chooses to die by suicide? Why is it always a woman? Sometimes, I am stunned by the decisions women take. In this novel, Revathi, the protagonist, has no explanation for why she is in love with this man,” Imayam says.

“Marriage is not determined by love. Caste, religion, education, money, position, power, and status. Her family treated Ravi shabbily because he possessed none of the above. The more they neglect him, the angrier he has become and Revathi becomes the victim,” he explained. This acclaimed novel is being made into a feature film by acclaimed film director Vetrimaaran.

The novel has been translated into English by GJV Prasad and published by Simon & Schuster. It has been longlisted to the Crossword Book Awards.

=== If there is a God ===
Translated to English by the accomplished Prabha Sridevan, the collection of 10 short stories mirrors the world and people that Imayam talks about. These are predominantly headlined by women characters — who are broken, fallen, embittered, hopeful, clever, warm, and always holding themselves up despite the circumstances. Imayam's style eschews description for disarming candour, a steely-eyed gaze, and sharp storytelling. Sridevan's translation organically brings out the nuances of dialects and colloquialisms in conversations and dialogues.

Vasantha's lament ‘If There is a God’ is a wretched cry when her little boy dies in an accident after being sexually abused, and the criminal is protected by an apathetic system and gruelling poverty. In ‘The Maniyakarar House’, Valliammai too asks, “Does a woman in this world have a home that belongs to her?” and decides at last to take matters into her own hands claiming real estate windfall. In ‘The Dubai Man’s Wife’, Padmavati is racked by guilt over her sexual lapse, while ‘Over in a Moment’ is about middle-aged Kamatchi's unmet desire. ‘Santha’ tells the story of a poor woman who upholds her dignity by resisting the temptations of an affair — all these tales are way too real and soul-searing. “The purpose of my writing is to represent men and women, family and community in the context of their beliefs and values and not judge them,” Imayam has said. It's easy to appreciate that statement in the context of this book whose evocative stories reflect the writer's powerful voice.

It is in the book launch of this event, legendary Indian filmmaker Adoor Gopalakrishnan asserted that Imayam's stories are very original, very interesting, very strong and valid. He said, "If Prabha Sridevan (the translator) had not asked me to read these stories... I would have been a loser in not knowing Mr.Imayam"

== Literature and politics ==
"How can a literary text be apolitical? How can writers escape their political reality?" claims Imayam in one of his interviews. Further, he adds "I see my writing as a product of the socio-political reality that I live in; If you reject politics you are distancing yourself from society." To Imayam, writing is a political act. No text is apolitical. Though he is a registered DMK party cadre, there is no biased stand in his works. Talking about Imayam's political affiliations, writer Jeyamohan differentiates it with his creative process. He says that both are two different worlds for the writer which never intersects.

“I do not write my stories”, Imayam proclaims in all his writings and speeches. Be it an interview or a book launch or any literary gathering that he participates in, he never fails to utter this statement, which has become a kind of miniature of all his writings. He has always maintained that he is not the author of his stories; he is just a moment in which the stories write themselves. Specifically, he claims that they are stories written by society. With this continual self-sacrifice of his authorial presence, his stories defy to be labelled or identified with any specific category and continue to transcend boundaries. It also enables him to portray the plurality of human nature and helps him to achieve a sense of polyvocality in his writings.

Through a literary career spanning over three decades, his writings capture the stories of the unnoticed people, often drawn from the marginalised lower strata of society. He holds a mirror up to society and reflects every nuance of it without any intervention. His characters are no dreamers but common people rooted to the land where they live, try to escape their brutal realities, and are in need of agency to voice their opinions, and do not want tomorrow as just an extension of today. With such characters who are denied almost everything, the author's preferential absence provides them with everything, particularly autonomy. This turns the limelight to those who are denied their voices and for whom society turned its deaf ear. For instance, Koveru Kaludhaigal (1994) deals with the Puthirai Vannar community, which is an untouchable community among the Dalits. Arumugam (1999) traces the life of a young man who gets stuck in the world of prostitutes. Selladha Panam (2019) presents the case of a burnt woman, a victim of the political economy of the institution of marriage. Vazhga Vazhga (2020) explores the plight of commoners at large political gatherings. His novella Pethavan (2013) is exposes the cruel tentacles of the caste system. All the characters of the above works are neither great personalities nor noble ones. They are labourers, masons, farmers, prostitutes, sweepers and many other such unnoticed people whom the society has inflicted injustice upon.

All seven novels, seven short story collections, and a novella by Imayam have captured the suffering of the marginalised sections. Those who are denied the right to speak are depicted speaking, those who are condemned to express are depicted expressing, and those who are humiliated to live are depicted living in his stories. This is achieved by the sacrifice of his authorial presence. By voluntarily relinquishing his hold on his characters, he lets them explore spaces hitherto unexplored. And with the obituary of his authorial presence, the characters celebrate their resurrection.

== Reception ==
His very first novel 'Koveru Kazhudhaigal’ has introduced an alternate narrative to the Tamil literary scene. It has won him both accolades and criticism for his portrayal of the untouchable community. Many critics believe that this novel is a major achievement in Tamil Literature. The late Tamil literary patriarch Sundara Ramasamy celebrated this novel as one of its kind. He wrote "“In artistically depicting in an uninhibited manner the full range of meanness created by human divisions, gathering the resulting sorrow and conveying it in writing, there is no Tamil work that equals this novel.” The Tamil writer and historian A.R.Venkatachalapathy writes, "Among Tamil writers, Imayam is exceptional in having subjected himself to rigorous editing. What it has done to the spontaneity of his writing is for future critics to assess." Among Tamil writers, Imayam is exceptional in having subjected himself to rigorous editing. What it has done to the spontaneity of his writing is for future critics to assess.

Writer Ambai praises the novella Pethavan for its precise and poignant description of the women characters. She writes "I have read Pethavan many times, and each time I have cried when the father feeds his daughter, places her head on his chest, and hugs her... When a story rises above the public image of the writer, it has truly succeeded in having an existence of its own that goes beyond the writer" Tamil Nadu Chief Minister MK Stalin has appreciated him for his realistic portrayal of the lives of the commoners. Kamal Haasan has praised Imayam for his constant and strong voice for the minorities of Tamil Nadu. Straddling his roles as a Dravidian activist and a writer, Imayam feels he cannot be labelled as either. “The labels are a burden to any writer. I would like to identify myself as a Tamil writer—someone who consistently documents Tamil life.”

== Bibliography ==
No	Title	தலைப்பு	Year of publication
1	Koveru Kazhudhaigal	கோவேறு கழுதைகள்	1994
2	Aarumugam	ஆறுமுகம்	1999
3	Man Baaram	மண் பாரம்	2002
4	Sedal	செடல்	2006
5	Video Mariamman	வீடியோ மாரியம்மன்	2008
6	Kolai Cheval	கொலைச் சேவல்	2013
7	Pethavan	பெத்தவன்	2013
8	Savu Soru	சாவு சோறு	2014
9	En Katha	எங் கதெ	2015
10	Narumanam	நறுமணம்	2016
11	Selladha Panam	செல்லாத பணம்	2018
12	Nan Maaran Kottai kathai	நன்மாறன்கோட்டைக் கதை	2019
13	Vaazhga Vaazhga	வாழ்க வாழ்க	2020
14	Ippodhu Uyirodirukkiren	இப்போது உயிரோடிருக்கிறேன்	2022
15	Thali Mela Sathiyam	தாலி மேல சத்தியம்	2023
16	Thiruneer Saami	திருநீறு சாமி	2023
17	Nenjaruppu	நெஞ்சறுப்பு	2024
18	Uppu Vandikkaran	உப்பு வண்டிக்காரன்	2024
19 20	Thandakaranyathil Seethai Noiputtru	தண்டகாரண்யத்தில் சீதை நோய்ப்புற்று	2025 2026

== Awards and accolades ==
No	Award	Year
1	Agni Akshara Award	1994
2	Tamil Nadu Progressive Writers Association Award	1994
3	Amudhan Adigal Literature Award	1998
4	Junior Fellowship Award, Department of Cultural, Govt. of India, New Delhi	2002
5	Thamizh Thendral Thiru.V.Ka. Award, Govt. of Tamil Nadu	2010
6	Anantha Vikatan Award	2016
7	Iyal Award	2018
8	Award for Contemporary Tamil Literature - The Hindu	2018
9	Sahitya Akademi award (Tamil) for "Selladha Panam"	2020
9	Kuvempu Rashtriya Puraskar National Award	2022

== Translations ==
=== Translated into English ===
1. Beasts of Burden (Koveru Kazhuthaigal – Novel, 2019) translated by Lakshmi Holmstorm, Niyogi Books D78, Okhla Industrial Area, Phase 1, New Delhi, Delhi 110020
2. Arumugam (Arumugam – Novel, 2006) Katha, Sri Aurobindo Marg, New Delhi.
3. Pethavan – The Begetter translated by Gita Subramaniyam, Oxford University Press (2015)
4. Video Mariamman and other short stories translated by Padma Narayanan – Short Story Collection - 2021, Speaking Tiger Books, New Delhi
5. If there is a God, translated by Prabha Sridevan - Short Story Collection - 2022, Ratna Publications.
6. An Order from the Sky, translated by Vasantha Surya - Short Story Collection - 2023, HarperCollins India.
7. A Woman Burnt (Selladha Panam - Novel) translated by GJV Prasad - Simon and Schuster - 2023.
8. Vaazhga Vaazhga and Other Stories, translated by Prabha Sridevan - Penguin Books - 2023.
9. She & I (En Kadhe - Novel) translated by Prof.D.Venkataramanan - Speaking Tiger Books - 2024.
10. She & I (En Kadhe - Novel) translated by Prof.D.Venkataramanan - Speaking Tiger Books - 2024.

=== Translated into French ===
1. Pethavan – Le Pere - 2020, Editions Characteres, Paris

=== Translated into German ===
1. Pethavan - Der Vater, translated by Thomas Vogel - Draupadi Verlag

=== Translated into Kannada and Telugu ===
1. Koveru Kazhudaigal – (Novel, 2009) - Baasha Bharathi, Bangalore.
2. Pethavan – Translated into Telugu on June-2013.

=== Translated into Malayalam ===
1. Thiranjedutha Kathakal, translated by Edamon Rajan, Olive Publications.

== See also ==
- List of Sahitya Akademi Award winners for Tamil
- List of Indian writers
- List of Tamil-language writers
