= B. S. Ramiah =

Batlagundu Subramanian Ramiah
- Born: Batlagundu Subramanian Ramiah; 24 March 1905; Batlagundu,Madura District, Madras Presidency, British India (now in Dindigul district, Tamil Nadu, India.
- Died: May 18, 1983 (aged 78); Madras, Tamil Nadu, India.
- Occupations: Writer, Script Writer
- Writing career
- Pen name: B.S.Ramiah
- Language: Tamil
- Subject: Literature
- Notable awards: Sahitya Akademi Award (1982)

Batlagundu Subramanian Ramiah (24 March 1905 – 18 May 1983) was a Tamil writer, journalist, and critic from Tamil Nadu, India. He was also a script and dialogue writer in Tamil films.

== Biography ==
B. S. Ramiah was born in Batlagundu in 1905. He came to Madras in 1921. He was involved in the Indian independence movement and was jailed for his participation in the Salt Satyagraha. His first short story Malarum Manamum (lit. The flower and the scent) was published in Ananda Vikatan in 1933 (it won third prize in the magazine's short story competition). He worked in the literary magazine Manikodi and was a writer in the literary movement of the same name. He was a contemporary of Manikodi writers like C. S. Chellappa, Va. Ramasamy, Pudumaipithan and Ku. Pa. Rajagopalan. During 1935–38 and later briefly in the 1950s he ran the magazine himself. He has written a number of short stories, novels and plays. According to C. S. Chellappa Ramiah wrote 304 short stories in total. Most of his plays were written for S. V. Sahasranamam's "Seva Stage" drama troupe. His works have been published in Ananda Vikatan, Kalki, Kumudam, Dina Mani, Gandhi, Jeyakodi.

In 1982, he was awarded the Sahitya Akademi Award for Tamil for his literary history of the Manikodi movement – Manikodikalam (lit. The Manikodi Era). He also wrote a number of original screenplays for Tamil films and a few of his works were also made into films.

== Partial bibliography ==
=== Non-fiction ===
- Manikodikalam (literary history)
- Cinema...? (1943)

=== Plays ===
- Therotti magan
- Policekaaran maga1
- President Panchatcharam (adaptation of Gogol's The Government Inspector)
- Malliyam Mangalam
- Poovilangu
- Panjali sabadham
- Kalappali

=== Novels ===
- Vithiyin vilayattu komala
- Kailasa Iyerin kedumathi
- Premaharaam
- Nandha Vilakku
- Thinai vidaithavan
- Sandhaipettai

== Filmography ==
- Boologa Rambai (1940)
- Madanakamarajan (1941)
- Baktha Naradhar (1942)
- Kubera Kusela (1943)
- Paranjothi (1945)
- Saalivahan (1945)
- Arthanaari (1946)
- Visithira Vanidha(1947)
- Dhana Amaravathi (1947)
- Mahatma Udangkar (1947)
- Devadasi (1948)
- Rathan Kumar (1949)
- Maaya Rambai (1952)
- Amar (1954)
- President Panchatcharam (1959)
- Raja Magudam (1960)
- Policekaran Magal (1962)
- Panathottam (1963)
- Selvam (1966)

== See also ==
- List of Sahitya Akademi Award winners for Tamil
- List of Indian writers
- List of Tamil-language writers
