= T. K. Doraiswamy =

Indian writer (1921–2007)

Nakulan
- Born: T. K. Doraiswamy; 21 August 1921; Kumbakonam, Tanjore District (Madras Presidency), British India,(now in Thanjavur district, Tamil Nadu, India
- Died: 17 May 2007 (aged 85); Thiruvananthapuram, Kerala, India
- Education: Annamalai University; University of Kerala
- Occupations: Professor- at Mar Ivanios College, Thiruvananthapuram
- Writing career
- Pen name: Nakulan
- Language: Tamil, English
- Genres: Short Story, Novel, Novella, Translator
- Subject: Literature
- Notable works: Ninaivup Patai Nilakal (1972); Words of the Wind (1973)
- Notable awards: Sahitya Akademi Award (1986)

T. K. Doraiswamy (21 August 1921 – 17 May 2007), also known by his pen name Nakulan, was an Indian poet, professor of English, novelist, translator and short fiction writer, who wrote both in Tamil and English, and is known for his surrealism and experimentation as well as free verse. He served as Professor of English, Mar Ivanios College, Thiruvananthapuram for four decades.

During his literary career which started in his forties, when he started writing in Ezhuthu, a literary magazine founded by C. S. Chellappa, he wrote a novel and six books of poems in English, and nine novels and five books of poems in Tamil. His English work was mostly published under his real name, while Tamil works often appeared under his pen name. He also wrote briefly under the pen name, S. Nayar(sp?). His symbolic novel Ninaivup Patai Nilakal (1972) is considered a milestone in Tamil literature and established him as an avant garde novelist. His other notable works in Tamil include, Nizhalgal, Naykal, Naveenante Diary Kurippukal, Ezhuthu Kavithaikal, Iruneenda Kavithaikal, Antha Manchal Nira Poonaikutty, and in English, Words to the Wind, 'Non-Being' and 'A Tamil Writer's Journal'.

He received the Asan Memorial Award for Tamil Poetry in 1983.

== Early life and education ==
Born in 1921, in Kumbakonam, in Thanjavur district, Tamil Nadu, Prof. Doraiswamy moved to Thiruvananthapuram at age 14.

Later he completed his MA in Tamil from Annamalai University, followed by M.A. in English from University of Kerala. He had an M.Phil. in Literature on Virginia Woolf's work.

== Career ==
He started serious writing only in 1960s, and was encouraged in pursuing the art by his good friend Ka. Naa. Subramanyam. Many of Nakulan's students acknowledge that he initiated them into the art of writing good poetry. He was widely read. He quietly influenced countless writers and artists who visited his house at Golf Links, Kaudiar, and had discussions with him, especially the young ones. Equally distinguished as a poet, translator, critic, anthologist, novelist and short fiction writer, his publications include a novel and six books of poems in English and nine novels and five books of poems in Tamil. His alter-ego Naveenan in his Tamil novels stands out as a modernist anti-hero who was perhaps the first of his kind in Tamil literature. He was one of the first writers to attempt techniques like stream of consciousness in Tamil literature ably. His use of the diary form in his novels like " Naveenan's Diary Jottings" was based on his admiration for the spirituality, philosophy and theology of the twentieth century (modern) mystic Simone Weil rather than influenced by writers like Anaïs Nin.

His only novel in English was called "Words for the Wind." (1973). His English poetry collections include "Words to the Listening Air," "Non – Being" and "A Tamil Writer's Journal I, II and III". He wrote a long poem in English called "Raja Vembala." His short stories were frequently published by Pritish Nandy in the Illustrated Weekly of India. He has translated James Joyce, T. S. Eliot and K. Ayyappa Paniker, to name just a few. His best translation work may be the book "The Little Sparrow" in which he devotes himself entirely to the great Subramania Bharati's writing.

Although the influence of James Joyce was pronounced in his writings, it was more the metaphysical and religious thrust similar to T. S. Eliot's and the spareness of style of a Samuel Beckett that really made his works stand out. He was definitely a late Modernist moving into the realm of Post-Modernism. He never compromised in his writing or his life on what was expected of an artist.

He retired as Professor of English, Mar Ivanios College, Thiruvananthapuram (University of Kerala) after serving for four decades, and started full-time freelance writing. His best known novels are Ninaivu Pathai, Naaikal (Dogs) and Vaakku Moolam (Confession).

He was awarded the Asan Memorial Award for Tamil Poetry in 1983, and several other literary awards.

== Personal life ==
He was a bachelor. He died on 17 May 2007, at Thiruvananthapuram, at the age of 86. He had looked after his parents till they died and so their domestic help Purthai took care of him till the very end.

== Works ==
English

- Words for the Wind. Writers Workshop, 1973. (as T.K. Doraiswamy)
- Routes of Evanescence: a cycle of poems. Samkaleen Prakashan, 1981.
- That Little Sparrow: poems from Subramanya Bharati, with Paratiyar. Zha Publications, 1982.
- A Tamil Writer's Journal I & II. Publisher: T.K. Duraiswamy, 1984.
- Words to the Listening Air. Atri Publishers.
- Non- Being

== Tamil ==
=== Short Story ===
- Nakulan Therndhedutha Sirukathaigal - (நகுலன்: தேர்ந்தெடுத்த சிறுகதைகள்)
- Oru raathal irachi (ஒரு ராத்தல் இறைச்சி)
- Hippies (ஹிப்பிகள்)
- Oru naal (ஒரு நாள்)
- Nillakal (நிழல்கள்) - 1965.
- Nakulan̲ Kathaigal (நகுலன் கதைகள்)- 1998.
- NaKulan sirukathaigal (நகுலன் சிறுகதைகள்)

=== Novel ===
- Naigal (நாய்கள்) - 1974.
- Navinaan Dayari (நவீனன் டைரி)- 1978.
- Ninaivup Paathai (நினைவுப் பாதை) - 1972.
- Nakulan Navalga (நகுலன் நாவல்கள்) -2006.
- Ivarkal (இவர்கள்)- 1983.
- Vakkumulam (வாக்குமூலம்) - 1992.
- Sila Aththiyaayangal: Kurunaaval (சில அத்தியாயங்கள்: குறுநாவல்)
- Gramam(கிராமம்) - 1991.

=== Poetry ===
- Nagulan thaerntheduththa kavidhaigal (நகுலன் தேர்ந்தெடுத்த கவிதைகள்) - 2001.
- Kannadiyahum kangal (கண்ணாடியாகும் கண்கள்) - 2006.
- Nakulan kavidhaigal (நகுலன் கவிதைகள்).
- Curuti(சுருதி) - 1987
- Moondru kavidhaigal (முன்று: கவிதைகள்) - 1979.
- Iynthu kavidhaigal (ஐந்து: கவிதைகள்) - 1981.
- Coat Stand kavidhaigal (கோட்ஸ்டாண்ட் கவிதைகள்) - 1981.
- Iru ninta kavitaikal (இரு நின்ற கவிதைகள்) - 1991

=== Essay ===
- Nakulan Katturaigal(நகுலன் கட்டுரைகள்) - 2002.

=== A literary anthology ===
- Gurukshetram (குருக்ஷேத்ரம்) - 1968.

== See also ==
- List of Indian writers
- List of Tamil-language writers
