= Constable Koothuru =

1963 film directed by Tapi Chanakya

- Poster
- Directed by: Tapi Chanakya
- Story by: B. S. Ramiah
- Based on: Policekaran Magal
- Starring: Jaggayya; Krishna Kumari; Gummadi; Rajasree; Kanta Rao
- Music by: R. Govardhanam
- Production company: Chitrakala
- Release date: 31 May 1963
- Country: India
- Language: Telugu

Constable Koothuru (transl. The Constable's Daughter) is a 1963 Telugu-language film directed by Tapi Chanakya. It is a remake of the 1962 Tamil film Policekaran Magal, itself based on a play of the same name. The film stars Jaggayya, Krishna Kumari, Rajasree, Gummadi and Kanta Rao. This was J. Jayalalithaa's first appearance as a child star in Telugu cinema.

== Plot ==
Dharmayya is an honest police constable who has two children: Gopi and Janaki. Gopi's friend Raghu is the spoilt son of a wealthy man named Venkatramayya. One day, Dharmayya raids a bar and catches Raghu gambling and arrests him, this leaves a bad opinion of Raghu on Dharmayya. In an attempt to change Raghu's lifestyle, Venkatramayya decides to marry off his niece Mallika to Raghu. But before the marriage, Raghu meets Janaki and they fall in love with each other. When Dharmayya finds out about Janaki's love, he reluctantly agrees to it. Raghu is later framed for assassination by his old friends Jackie and Joker. The rest of the film deals with whether Raghu will marry Janaki, and how he will prove his innocence.

== Cast ==
- Gummadi as Dharmayya
- Jaggayya as Gopi
- Krishna Kumari as Janaki
- Rajasree
- Kanta Rao as Raghu
- Film News Anandan as a police photographer
- Jayalalithaa (special appearance in the song "Andham Kosam Kannulu")

== Production ==
Constable Koothuru is a remake of the 1962 Tamil film Policekaran Magal, itself based on a play of the same name. Film News Anandan, who played a police photographer in the original film, reprised his role in this film. Jayalalithaa made her Telugu debut with this film, appearing as a dancer in the song "Andham Kosam Kannulu". Cinematography was handled by D.L. Narayana, and the editing by N. M. Shankar.

== Soundtrack ==
The soundtrack of the film was composed by R. Govardhanam.

No.	Title	Lyrics	Singer(s)	Length
1.	"Andham Kosam Kannulu"	Cheruvu Anjaneya Sastry	P. Susheela, P. B. Sreenivas
2.	"Chigurakula Vooyelalo Ila Marachina O Chiluka"	Anisetty Subbarao	P. Susheela, P. B. Sreenivas
3.	"Poovuvale Virabooyavale"	Aatreya	P. Susheela, P. B. Sreenivas
4.	"Pudithenu Purusuduga Putake Koraddu"	Aatreya	L. R. Eswari, Pithapuram Nageswara Rao
5.	"Vennela kela Naa pai Kopam"	Aatreya	P. B. Sreenivas
6.	"Chigurakula Vooyelalo Ila Marachina O Chiluka" (Sad)	Anisetty Subbarao	P. Susheela, P. B. Sreenivas
7.	"Kallallo Neerendhulaku Kalakaalam Vilapinchutaku"	Aatreya	S. Janaki, Ghantasala
8.	"Poolu Mudichi Pudami Vidichi"		T. R. Jayadev
