= Sundara Ramaswamy =

Indian novelist, poet and translator (1931-2005)

- Sundara Ramasamy
- Born: 30 May 1931; Vadasery (of Nagercoil), Trivandrum Division, Kingdom of Travancore, British India (now in Kanyakumari District, Tamil Nadu, India)
- Died: 15 October 2005 (aged 74); Melbourne, US
- Occupation: Writer
- Children: 4
- Awards: Kumaran Asan Memorial Award

Sundara Ramaswamy (30 May 1931 – 15 October 2005) was an Indian novelist, poet, translator, and literary critic, widely considered to be a preeminent figure in post-Independence Tamil literature. His notable works include "Oru Puliyamarathin Kathai", "J.J. Sila Kuripugal", "Kuzhanthaigal," "Pengal," and "Aangal." He was a key figure in Tamil modern literature. The translations of his novels and short stories have brought him international acclaim. Sundara Ramaswamy has been praised for his versatility and his skillful negotiation of various literary forms: poetry, short fiction, and the novel.

Ramaswamy began his literary career translating Thakazhi Sivasankara Pillai's Malayalam novel, Thottiyude Makan, into Tamil. His early short stories were published in progressive literary journals like Shanthi and Saraswati. He wrote over 80 short stories, three novels, a little over 100 poems, and many essays and reviews. In 1987, he launched a literary review, Kalachuvadu, which folded after eight quarterly issues and a final special edition. It was revived in a different form by his son Kannan Sundaram in 1994.

== Early years ==
Sundara Ramaswamy was born in 1931 in Thazhuviya Mahadevan Kovil, a village in Nagercoil, then part of the princely state of Travancore. He spent his childhood in Kottayam, Travancore, where his father worked as a Burmah Oil agent. Originating from a Tamil Brahmin family, he spoke the language, but as he lived in Travancore, he only learned to read and write in Malayalam. His father decided to move to Nagercoil, Kanyakumari in 1939. He continued his schooling there but was generally considered to be a poor student. Kanyakumari was then still a part of Travancore, so his education continued in Malayalam.

When he was 10 years old, he developed rheumatoid arthritis and remained ill for the next five or six years. Often bedridden, his schooling was interrupted regularly until he discontinued it altogether. He taught himself Tamil from the age of 18, and became exposed to writing from the magazine Manikodi, and famous Tamil writers such as Na. Pitchamurthy and C.S. Chellappa. He was particularly influenced by Pudumaipithan.

== Career ==
At 20, he began his literary career, translating Thakazhi Sivasankara Pillai's Malayalam novel, Thottiyude Makan into Tamil and writing his first short story, 'Muthalum Mudivum', which he published in Pudimaipithan Ninaivu Malar. He was influenced by the works of contemporary thinkers such as Gandhi, Periyar, Sri Aurobindo, Ramakrishna Paramahansa, Ram Manohar Lohia, J. C. Kumarappa and J. Krishnamurty. In 1952, he began to be influenced by Marxist theory after meeting the Communist T. M. C. Raghunathan, editor of the magazine Shanti. He joined the editorial board of Saraswathi, edited by Vijayabhaskaran, who was also a Communist. He met the editor M. Govindan in 1957, they became friends.

=== Short stories and Novels ===
The majority of his early short stories were published in the magazines Sarawathi and Santhi, although he also wrote several collections, among them Akkaraic Chimaiyil (On the Shores Beyond, 1959) and Pitatchatam (Offerings, 1964). Oru Puliamarathin Kathai (The Story of a Tamarind Tree, 1966) was his first novel. It received critical acclaim, and is now regarded as a groundbreaking classic of Tamil literature. He edited and published a literary magazine called Kalachuvadu. Ramaswamy suspended active writing for nearly six years; and when he resumed in 1973, his style had evolved. It was in this phase that he wrote the short stories in Pallikutt takhihal (The Palanquin Bearers), the book of novellas Tiraikal ayiram (Thousand Curtains), and later the novel J.J. Silakuripukal (J.J. Some Notes) in 1988. He published his last novel, Kuzhanthaigal, Pengal, and Aangal (Children, Women, Men) in 1995.

=== Poetry ===
He wrote his first poem "Un Kai Nagam" in 1959, using the pseudonym 'Pasuvayya' and publishing it in Ezhuthu. Nadunisi nayagal (Midnight Dogs) was published in 1975, followed by Pasuvayya kavithagal (Pasuvayya poems). Although his earlier poems used structured language, they later became more spontaneous. His poetry is collected in the book 107 Kavithaikal.

=== Translation Work ===
He has translated from Malayalam into Tamil two of Thakazhi Sivasankara Pillai's books Chemmeen and Thottiyude Magan and short stories by Basheer, Karoor Neelakanta Pillai and M. Govindan.

=== Critical writing ===
He wrote Na.Pichamoorthiyin Kalai marabum manitha neyamum, a book of criticism on N. Pichamoorthi's literary works. Analysing the author's poetry and short stories in depth, Ramaswamy describes how Pichamoorthi has contributed to free verse poetry with his simple words and philosophy, and defines how Pichamoorthi has set the grammar for how free verse poetry should be, in comparison to many modern poets. The book was released in April 1991 by Vanathi Publications.

== Translations of works ==
Oru Puliamarathin Kathai has been translated into English (Tale of a Tamarind Tree, Penguin India, New Delhi), Hindi, Malayalam and Hebrew.

Penguin India has released a new translation of Oru Puliyamarathin Kadai, titled Tamarind History. A translation of Kuzhanthaikal, Pengal, and Aangal, titled Children, Women, and Men, was also released.

== Death ==
He died in the United States from pulmonary fibrosis in 2005, aged 74. He was survived by a son and two daughters.

== Awards and honours ==
He received the Kumaran Asan Memorial Award in 1988, the Iyal Award from The Tamil Literary Garden in 2001 and the Katha Chudamani Award in 2004

== See also ==
- List of Indian writers
