= Kanakaraj Balasubramanyam =

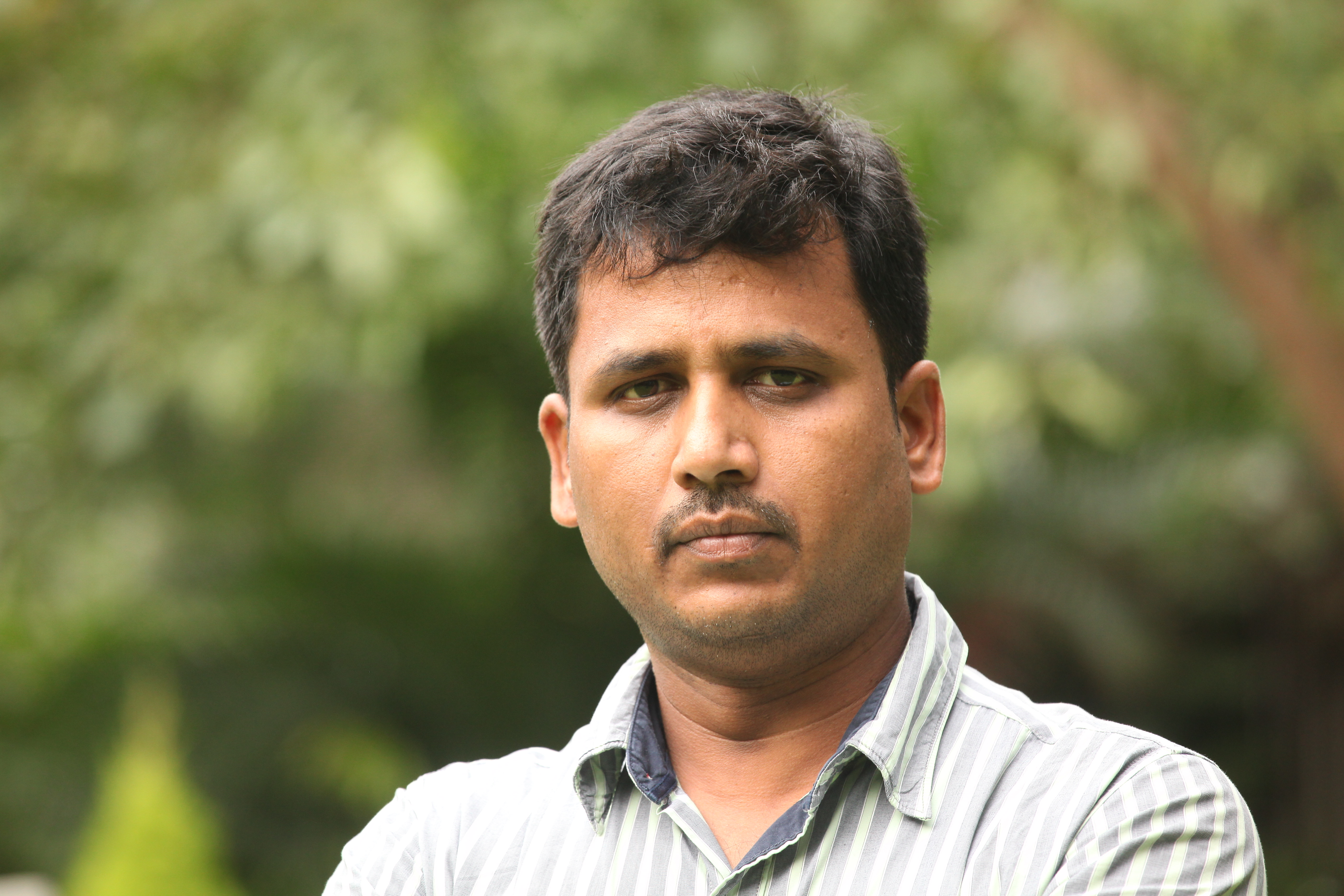
- Kanakaraj Balasubramanyam
- Born: Kanakaraj Balasubramanyam Aranakatte; Hiriyur, Chitradurga, Karnataka
- Education: Bangalore University
- Occupations: Writer; Director; Lecturer
- Children: Akshara Zen, Ivanka Zen
- Writing career
- Pen name: ಕನಕರಾಜ್ ಆರನಕಟ್ಟೆ, கனகராஜ் பாலசுப்பிரமணியம்
- Genres: Fiction,Short Films
- Subjects: Post Modern Fiction, Hysterical realism,Hedonistic realism
- Notable works: Burma Express, Ceylon Cycle, Al Khozama
- Notable awards: Translation Award from Kuvempu Bhasha Bharathi, Government of Karnataka U R Ananthamurthy short story Award, Kannada Sangha, Shivamogga Best Novel Award, Zero Degree Publishing House, Chennai

Kanakaraj Balasubramanyam is an Indian author, filmmaker, academician, and journalist, primarily known for his contributions to Kannada and Tamil literature and short films. His literary works, which explore themes of immigrant life, dislocation, and post-modern existence, include the Kannada short story collection Ceylon Cycle, which won the U R Ananthamurthy Award, and his acclaimed Tamil novel, Al Khozama, a winner of the Zero Degree Publication Novel Prize. As a filmmaker, his short film, "Burma Express," was recognized with the Best Short Film award at the South Asian International Film Festival. He received translation award from Kuvempu Bhasha Bharathi , Government of Karnataka in 2026.

== Career ==
Kanakaraj began his literary journey by writing short stories. In 2001, he embarked his career as a journalist for a short time with Aakruthi, Kannada Magazine.

Kanakaraj pursued his education in Bangalore University. He began his teaching career in 2001 at Seshadripuram College and BSVP college for Women in Bengaluru. Subsequently, he moved abroad, teaching English in the Maldives and later at a university in Libya. In 2008, he moved to Saudi Arabia.

He teaches English literature at Prince Sattam Bin Abdulaziz University, Saudi Arabia. In 2025, he initiated Nelaa, a cultural foundation that promotes Indian Dance, Music and Art forms among non-resident Indian's.

== Author ==
Kanakaraj worked under the tutelage of Writer, Director Nagathihalli Chandrashekar.He was assistant director to Nagathihalli Chandrashekar.

In 2017, he published Kannada Short Story Collection Ceylon Cycle. It received UR Ananathamurthy award from Shivamogga Kannada Sangha and was reviewed well in literary circles.

His middles have been published in leading Kannada Newspapers like Prajavani, Kannada Prabha & periodicals like Mayura.

He's active in the literary competitions and has won quite a few awards for his short stories. Kanakaraj has translated works of Tamil Authors like Imayam, Indira Parthasarathy into Kannada.
He has translated works of Devanur Mahadeva into Tamil. He received translation award from Kuvempu Bhasha Bharathi , Government of Karnataka in 2026 for the translation of short stories by renowned Tamil writer Imayam.

His published works in Kannada are:

- Ceylon Cycle 2017 ISBN 978-93-81920-84-8
- Zorbana rekhkhe naanu 2022
- Bhagyala Thande ISBN 978-93-84501-57-0
- Aurangazeb ISBN 978-93-87592-52-0

Kanakaraj has also published works in Tamil, notable among them are:

- Al Khozama ISBN 978-93-95233-26-2 explores lives of Arab Bedouins and Indian expatriates. It won the Zero Degree Publication Novel Prize 2021
- Palaivanaththi Aindham Suvar ISBN 978-93-91994-18-1
- Nila Nigazhangal

== Film Making ==
Kanakaraj assisted Nagathihalli Chandrashekar in his movie ventures. In 2018, he directed a Short film Burma Express, which was awarded Best Short film in 2018 edition of South Asian International Film Festival. His movie 99 was featured in 2024 Dasara Film Festival.
