= Dhanushkodi Ramasamy =

Danushkodi Ramasamy (1945? – 24 November 2005) was a Tamil writer from Tamil Nadu, India. His works were characterized by his sympathies with communist ideals and depictions of the plight of labourers. He was the general secretary of the Tamil Nadu Kalai Ilakkia Perumanram, a literary organisation.

== Biography ==
Danushkodi Ramasamy was born in Kalingal Mettuppatti a village near Sattur, Tamil Nadu. His father was a school teacher. Ramasamy obtained master's degrees in Arts and Education (M.A and M.Ed) and began his teaching career as a primary teacher in Ayira Vysiya Higher Secondary School in Sattur. He eventually became the Head master of the school, a post he resigned from, as he felt it was interfering with his literary activities. He continued as a higher secondary teacher in the same school. During his younger days he was a proponent of the Thani Tamil Iyakkam (Pure Tamil movement) and Gandhism. In his later life he became a supporter of Marxism. His first short story Simma Soppanam was published in 1978. During his writing career, he wrote a number of short stories and novels. His best known work is the 1985 novel Thozhar. Some of his short stories were published in the magazine Ananda Vikatan. In 1990, the Communist Party of India's (CPI) publishing arm - New century Book house - awarded him the best Tamil short story writer award. In 1992, his work Theemtharigida won the Lilli Desigamani memorial prize. In 1991, he won the Ananda Vikatan Diamond Jubilee short story competition and in 94 the Agni Subhamangla short story competition. He served as a state secretary of the Tamil Nadu Kalai Ilakkia Perumanram and at the time of his death was its general secretary. Ramasamy died on 24 November 2005 after a prolonged illness.

== Bibliography ==
- Simma Soppanam (1978)
- Naranamma (1983)
- Thozhar (1985)
- Theemthirigada(1992)
- Vazhkai Neruppu(2000)
- Penmai enrum vazhga
- Nizhal ennum oru kavidhai

== Legacy ==
Ramasamy’s stories and novels have been translated into Kannada, Malayalam and Bengali. After his death the Danushkodi Ramasamy Trust was established at Sattur in his memory. The Trust awards an annual prize for Tamil short story writers, conducts literary meetings and writing workshops for school children.
