= Dhamayanthi =

Indian Tamil writer

Dhamayanthi is a Tamil fiction writer, poet, lyricist and film director.

== Life ==
Dhamayanthi was born in Tirunelveli, in the Indian state of Tamil Nadu. Her parents were teachers, and she imbibed her love for reading and arts from them. She claims that the books her father would gift during her birthday and the inevitable loneliness of childhood made her develop immense interest in books, which later enabled her to develop her passion for writing.

She did her B.A. in English from Sarah Tucker College, Tirunelveli, and her M.A. in English from St. John's, Tirunelveli. Her first couple of short stories were published around this time and she won cash prizes for both. Her subsequent short stories garnered attention and an anthology soon came out. She continued writing poetry, though her fiction was generating more attention and interest. She worked as a radio jockey and program produce in Tirunelveli before moving to Chennai to work as a writer in the film industry. She is a lyricist in the Tamil film industry and wrote many songs. Her first song was from the movie "Vizhithiru".

== Career ==
She writes popular stories of intensity and depth. She balances her deep concern with gender inequality and socio-political issues and her intent to narrate a tale that reveals the unpredictability of the human mind. Her stories focus on the subtle power play in man-woman relationships in a family, which borders on physical violence, and the more obvious violence inflicted upon women. She was inspired to study English literature after she discovered Emily Dickinson.

She published six short story collections, a novel and an essay collection. She translated Sylvia Plath’s poetry into Tamil.

In television, she debuted as a script writer in Samuthirakani’s debutant serial produced by Minbimbangal. She directed documentaries on social issues and a docu-fiction on surrogate mothers. She co-wrote one of the three stories of Vizhithiru along with director Meera Kathiravan. She co-wrote the script for the Tamil film Vizhithiru (2018). She wrote lyrics for eleven other films. She wrote a script for Bharat Bala and another to be directed by Kutti Revathi. Thadayam is based on her short story published in Ananda Vikatan. Her short story on the thermal power station – the environmental devastation caused by its effluents – was made into a short film.

== Selected works ==
Tamil books

- கொன்றோம் அரசியை(சிறுகதை) - பனிக்குடம் பதிப்பகம்
- இந்த நதி நனைவதற்கல்ல(கட்டுரை) - பிரக்ஞை
- ஒரு வண்ணத்துப் பூச்சியும் சில மார்புகளும் (சிறுகதை) - கருப்புப் பிரதிகள்
- அக்கக்கா குருவிகள் (சிறுகதை) - போதி
- சாம்பல் கிண்ணம் (சிறுகதை)- போதி
- வாக்குமூலம்(சிறுகதை) - போதி
- நிழலிரவு (சிறுகதை) - காவ்யா பதிப்பகம்
- முற்பகல் ராஜ்ஜியம் (சிறுகதை) - கவிதா பப்ளிகேஷன்
- என் பாதங்களில் படரும் கடல் (கவிதை) - டிஸ்கவரி புக் பேலஸ்
- தமயந்தியின் சிறுகதைகள் - சுப்ரஜா ஶ்ரீதரனின் பதிப்பகம்
- மனம் என்னும் மாய கண்ணாடி - மின்னம்பலம்
- முட்களின் மேல் சில பட்டாம்பூச்சிகள் - பேட்டிகள் மின்னம்பலம்
- வல்லமை தாராயோ - மின்னம்பலம் கட்டுரைகள்

Tamil songs

- Vizhithiru (Movie) - Vellai Irave (song) - Singers: G.V Prakash Kumar, NSK Ramya
- karichan kuruvi (Movie) - Naan Saami Pulla (song)

== Awards ==
She was conferred The Hindu (Tamil) Bharathi award for her contribution to women's writing.
