= Murugabhoopathy =

Murugaboopathy
- Born: 29 April 1971 (age 55); Nenmeni Mettupatti, Tamil Nadu

Murugaboopathy (born 29 April 1971) is a Ustad Bismillah Khan Yuva Puraskar award winning playwright from the Tamil Nadu state of India. The award was presented to him in 2011 by Sangeet Natak Akademi.

== Personal life ==
Murugaboopathy's elder brothers are the Tamil short-story writers Tamilselvan and Konangi a postmodern Tamil writer. He grew up in Naagalapuram and Nenmeni Mettupatti and he currently lives in Kovilpatti, Tamil Nadu. His maternal grandfather ‘Madurakavi' Baskaradoss was a popular playwright, his father M.S. Shanmugam is a novelist, short-story writer and poet.

He did his masters in theatre-arts from Pondicherry University.

== Career ==
Murugaboopathy started his acting career in theatre from his brother's street theatre group Shristi. He acted in the street play "Safdar Hashmi Nataka Kuzhu" that paid tribute to the theatre activist Safdar Hashmi and took the play to more than 150 villages.

Later his first play in 1993 as writer was Marana Veetin Kurippukal, which was based on the Fyodor Dostoyevsky's Notes From a Dead House. His next 1994 play Sarithirathin Atheetha Museum was about the crimes in third world countries.

His 2013 play Soorpanangu was based on the atrocities and plight of women. The play was released in the backdrop of the 2012 Delhi gang rape incident.

=== Works ===
- 1993 - Marana Veetin Kurippukal
- 1994 - Sarithirathin Atheetha Museum
- 2000 - Vanathathi
- 2000 - Koondhal Nagaram
- 2002 - Uthira Mugamoodi
- 2006 - Chemmoothai
- 2009 - Kutram Patriya Udal
- 2010 - Mirugavidhushagam
- 2011 - Soorpanangu
- 2013 - Kuhaimaravasigal
- 2015 - Mayakkomalikalin Jalakkannadi
- 2016 - Neer Nadodikal
