= Vembu Vikiraman =

Indian writer

Vembu Vikraman
- Born: Subbarayar Vembu; 19 March 1928
- Died: 1 December 2015 (aged 87)
- Occupations: writer, journalist
- Parent(s): Subbarayar, Lakshmiyammal

Subarayar Vembu (19 March 1928 – 1 December 2015), better known by the pseudonym of Vikiraman, was an Indian novelist, short story writer and a journalist who wrote in Tamil. He was also a writer of children's literature.

== Biography ==
He was born to Subarayar and Lashmiammal. His father was an employee of Southern Railways during British rule and was one of the surveyors who was responsible for the construction of the Pamban Bridge. His father also worked for Sudeshamitran, a Tamil daily under the editorship of Bharathiyaar.

== Early years ==
He was always interested in journalism, especially handwritten magazines in his school days. In his high school, he started publishing a magazine called Tamil Chudar which was acclaimed by Kalki Krishnamurthy, Rajaji and A.K. Gopal Chettiyar.

He has travelled extensively to places like Malaysia, Singapore, Sri Lanka, Paris, Dubai, Rome and places of historical significance in India.

== Journalism ==
He worked for a weekly magazine called Velli Mani from 1946–1947, for Tamizh Pannai in 1948. He edited arguably the longest surviving Tamil literary monthly magazine, Amudasurabhi, for over five decades (1951–2003). He started a fortnightly Tamil literary magazine Illakiyapeedam in 1997 and is its editor and publisher. He was also the editor of the following magazines: Kuruvi (children's weekly), Sundari (fortnightly), Mangalam (weekly) and Tamil Arasi (weekly).

== Works ==
Vikiraman is known more for his novels, particularly historical novels, than for his short stories. He edited arguably the longest surviving Tamil literary magazine, Amudasurabhi, for well over five decades (1949–2002). He is perhaps the only Tamil writer who has tried his hand in almost every genre, in addition to novel and short story, drama, poetry, travelogue and essay. He has also written stories for children and books on history for the youth in simple Tamil.

His first historical novel, Udayachandran, appeared in 1957 and he has added 33 more in the four succeeding decades. The most famous of these has been Nandipurathu Nayagi, first serialised in Amudasurabi during 1957–59, and published in book form in 1964. Nandipurathu Nayagi is in fact a sequel to Ponniyin Selvan of his better-known contemporary and mentor, Kalki Krishnamurthy, whose influence on Vikiraman is quite significant in respect of both historical novels and short stories.

With more than 150 short stories in 62 years to his credit, Vikiraman continues to write fiction for Ilakkiya Peetam, which he presently edits. Although he has received many accolades including the Kalaimamani title from the Tamil Nadu Government and an award from Tamil University, Thanjavur, for his literary achievements, he wants to be known for his short stories as well. And hence this collection of his 70 short stories, as he reveals his mind in Kathaiyin Kathai, a sort of preface to the volume. Judged from J.B. Priestley's observation that "at its best, the short story offers us a wonderfully clear little window through which we can see something of the lights and shadows, the heights and depths of life in this world," a substantial number of the stories in this collection pass the test.

== Bibliography ==
=== Children's book ===
- Tanneer Pappa (1946)

=== Historical novels ===
==== Pallava Period ====
- Udhayachandiran
- Kanchisundari
- Kadalmallai Kaadhali
- Kovoor Koonan
- Parivadini
- Manikkaveenai

==== Pandya Period ====
- Pandyan Mahudam
- Pagaivanin Kaadhali
- Kanni Kottai Elavarasi

==== Chola Period ====
- Nandhipuraththu Nayagi
- Kulottungan Sabadam
- Chittiravalli
- Maravarman Kaadhali
- Rajadittan Sabadam
- Thyagavallabhan
- Yaazhnangai
- Chola Elavarasan Kanavu
- Therkku Vaasal Mohini
- Kondrai Malar Kumari
- Chola Mahudam
- Mangala Devan Magal
- Oruvaal Orumahudam Iruvizhikkal
- Vanjeenagar Vanjee
- Vandiya Devan Vaal
- Rajarajan Sabadam
- Gangapuri Kaavalan
- Paraandagan Magal

=== Social novels ===
==== Historical ====
- Naachiyaar Magal
- Ratnahaaram

==== General ====
- Idhayapeedam
- Thituvilakku
- Gandhimadiyin Kanavan
- Azhagu Raani
- Nalla Manidargal
- Chandiramadi

=== Short story collections ===
- Vikiraman Sirukadhaigal
- Ponnvizha Aandu Sirukadhai KALANJIYAM (51 stories)
- Azhagin Niram Amaithi
- Kuzhal Osai
- Somadevarin Uzhil
- Thanga Vigraham
- Kadamaiyum Kadaivizhiyum
- Oh! Mudhaliya Sirukadaigal
- Sanghu Devan Punarjanmam
- Pavazha Vizha Aandu Sirukadhai KALANJIYAM (70 stories)
- Swarna Kili (novella)
- Abhimaana Valli (historical short stories)

=== Books for youth ===
- Porkaalathin Kadhai
- Kaanchi Kaavalar Kadhai

=== Travelogues ===
- Vatapi Vijayam
- Mammalapuram (1947)
- Sirrpam Chittiram Gopuram Kovil

=== English books ===
- Telugu Kings in Tamil Nadu

=== Plays ===
- Sollkaatu Sedhupadi
- Parivadhini (dramatised)
- Idhayapeedam (dramatised)
- Nimmadhi (televised)

=== Biographies ===
- Mahaatmavin Paadhai
- Yeppo Varuvaro?

=== Edited collections ===
- Pannmugha Paarvaiyil Bharathiyin Padaippukal

=== Autobiography ===
- Marakka Mudiyaadhvarkal
- Ninaithu Paarkkiren Part 1&2

== Honours ==
- 1981 Tamil Nadu State Tamil Development Department Award for 'Chola Elavarasan Kanavu'
- Raja Sir Annamalai Chettiyaar award by MAC Trust for the novel 'Madhurai Mahudam'
- Honorary Doctorate in Tamil Literature by World University
- 1988 Tamizh Annai Virudu by Thanjavur Tamil University
- 1991 Kalaimaamani by Tamil Nadu Government
- Kapila Vaannar Virudu by Thirukoviloor Cultural Association
- Narkkadai Nambi award by Kundrakkudiadikal
- Centurion Trust Award by Chennai Cosmopolitan Club
- Vaagai Chemmal Award by Salem Tamil Sangam
- Bharathiyaar Virudu by Chennai Bharathiyaar Sangam
- He has been bestowed with the titles of 'Charitra Kadhai Chemmal', 'Muttamizh Vittagar', 'Pannpattu Kaavalar', 'Sirukadhai Sekkiyaar', ' Kadhai Kalai Chemmal', 'Aruntamizh Maamani', 'Maamnidar' etc. by various cultural associations

== Social services/posts Held ==
- President, All India Tamil Writer's Association
- Trustee, Tamil Writer's Well Being Trust
- Chief Patron, Bharathiyaar Annual Festival at Ettayapuram
- Government representative to Eyal Isai Nataka Manram
- Twice member of Censor Board of Film Certification (Chennai Region)
