= Ka. Naa. Subramanyam =

Indian writer and critic

Ka. Na. Subramaniam
- Born: Ka. Na. Subramaniam; 31 January 1912; Swamimalai,Tanjore District (Madras Presidency), British India,(now in Thanjavur district, Tamil Nadu, India
- Died: 18 December 1988 (aged 76); Delhi
- Spouse: Raaji
- Children: Pappa
- Parent(s): Kanthaadai Narayanasamy (Father) & Visalakshi (Mother)
- Writing career
- Pen name: Ka. Na. Su
- Language: Tamil
- Genres: Short Story, Novel, Novella
- Subject: Literature
- Notable awards: Sahitya Akademi Award (1986)

Ka. Naa. Subramanyam (31 January 1912 – 18 December 1988)was a Sahitya Akademi Award winning Tamil writer and critic from Tamil Nadu, India. He is also popularly known by his Tamil initials as Ka. Naa. Su.

== Biography ==
Subramanian was born on 31 January 1912 in Swamimalai in Thanjavur District. His first noted published work was the novel Poithevu (1946). He also wrote poems under the pseudonym Mayan. He published many literary journals like Ilakkiya vattam, Sooravali and Chandraodayam. He became a literary critic in the 1950s, publishing reviews first in the magazines Swadesamitran and Saraswathi. He was a friend and contemporary of fellow literary critic C. S. Chellappa with whom he was involved in a long literary feud. He was considered as a right-winger and Anti-Marxist by left-leaning Tamil writers. In 1965, he moved to New Delhi and started writing articles for English-language newspapers. For the next twenty years he lived in Delhi and moved back to Chennai only in 1985. In 1986, he was awarded the Sahitya Akademi Award for Tamil for his literary criticism Ilakkiyathukku oru Iyakkam (lit. A Movement for Literature). After his return to Chennai, he started writing for Tamil magazines like Kungumam, Mutharam, Dina mani Kathir and Thuglak. Pondicherry University made him an honorary professor.

In 2006, his works were nationalised by the Government of Tamil Nadu.

== Death ==
He died in 18th December 1988 in Delhi.

== Awards and recognitions ==
- Sahitya Akademi Award for Ilakkiyathukku oru Iyakkam (Literary criticism) (1986)
- Government of Tamil Nadu award for the short story Kodhai Sirithaal
- Kumaran Asan award

== Partial bibliography ==
=== Novels ===
- Sarmavin uyil
- Pasi
- Vaazhndavar kettal
- Sakthi vilasam
- Ezhu per
- Oru naal
- Puzhithi ther
- Maalthedi
- Nadutheru
- Gopuravaasal
- Poithevu
- Asurakanam
- Pithappoo
- Kothai Sirithall

=== Short story collections ===
- Manikoondu
- Adarangu
- Karugadha mottu
- Kannan En Thozhan

=== Literary criticism ===
- Vimarsana kalai
- Padithirukireergala
- Ulagathu sirandha novelgal
- Ilakkiya Visaaram

=== Translations ===
- Anbuvazhi
- Thabaal kaaran
- Madhaguru
- Nilavalam
- Vilangupannai (Animal Farm)
- Devamalar
- kaali

=== English books ===
- Tiruvalluvar and his Tirukkural

== See also ==
- List of Sahitya Akademi Award winners for Tamil
- List of Indian writers
- List of Tamil-language writers
