= M. Ilanchezhian =

- Born: October 21, 1925; Perunagar, Near Kanchipuram, Tamil Nadu
- Died: March 1, 2009; Chennai
- Other name: M. Kumarasamy
- Occupations: Professor, Journalist
- Movement: Rationalist, Self-respect
- Spouse: Sundarambal
- Parents: Abhirami (Mother); Kanchi Manimozhiar (Father)

M. Ilanchezhian (1925 - 2009) was a professor of economics, tamil scholar, orator, journalist, writer, leader in the self-respect movement, rationalist.

== Life ==
M. Ilanchezhian was born on 21 October 1925 in a village called Perunagar, near Kanchipuram. The family in which he was born, belonged to the clan of Mudaliar, Sengundhar Kaikkolar.

== Education and career ==
- He studied from seventh grade to SSLC (11th) at Muthaialupettai High School, Chennai.
- He studied B. A. [BA(Hons)] in Economics at Pachaiyappan College, Chennai .
- He joined Pachaiyappan College, Chennai on 26 July 1952 as a Professor in the Department of Economics.
- In 1964, he served as the Head of the Department of Economics and Professor at Pachaiyappan Men's College, Kanchipuram.
- In July 1975, he was promoted to the Principal of Pachaiyappan College, Kanchipuram.
- In 1977, he was transferred again to Pachaiyappan College, Chennai as a Professor.
- He served as the Principal of Kandasamy Naidu College, Chennai from 1982 - 1984 and retired from service.

Ilanchezhian worked as Professor for 32 years. He conducted economics lessons for various classes. He would deliver economics lectures in English. In his lectures, he had the ability to appropriately handle parables, proverbs and short stories as needed. This way, he could deliver economics lessons in an interesting manner. Students from other classes would stand outside his class and listen to his lessons with interest.

== Journalist ==
He worked as the co-editor of the weekly magazine "Porvaal", which was started on 16 August 1947 and published with the mottos 'Our goal is a happy Dravidian state'and 'A life lived with Self-respect gives happiness'. His father Kanchi Manimozhiar was the other editor of the Porvaal magazine. Porvaal magazine was published in Tamil Nadu for seven years from 16 August 1947 to 8 August 1954, and after a short gap, from 5 January 1957 to 3 May 1958 for almost nine years.

== Social worker ==
He was fully aligned with the policies of the Justice Party, the Self-Respect Movement, the Dravidar Kazhagam, and the Dravida Munnetra Kazhagam . He had a desire to do public service since his childhood. In 1936, while studying in the seventh grade, he incorporated the "Ilaingar Ottrumai Kazhagam" (Youth Unity Club) organization, and the youth of the Muthaialupettai area in Chennai were invited to be members of this Club. He also developed the oratory skills of the youth of that area. He used to express his rationalistic views in the public meetings that he addressed.

== Books ==
M. Ilanchezhian has written several books. "தமிழன் தொடுத்த போர்" is a book that details the agitation and resistaance that the Tamilians showed towards the enforcement of Hindi in schools of Tamilnadu Internet archives has a copy of the book.

=== Tamil Books ===
1. "ஈரோட்டுப் பாதை", என்னும் நூல் தன்மான இயக்கம் பிறந்து வளர்ந்த கதையை சுருக்கமாக எடுத்துக்கூறும் நூல். 1947 இல் முதல் பதிப்பும், 1948இல் இரண்டாம் பதிப்புமாக வெளியிடப்பட்டது.
2. "தமிழன் தொடுத்த போர்", - 1938, 1939 ஆகிய ஆண்டுகளில் தமிழ் மக்கள் திரண்டெழுந்து கட்டாய இந்தி திணிப்புக்கு எதிராக நடத்திய அறப் போராட்டத்தின் முழு வரலாறுதான் இந்த நூல். தந்தை பெரியார் இந்த புத்தகத்துக்கு அணிந்துரை எழுதியுள்ளார். http://www.sudoc.fr/ 188685200
3. "அறிஞர் அண்ணாதுரை", என்னும் நூல் வேலூரில் உள்ள 'திராவிடன் பதிப்பகம்' என்னும் படிப்பகத்தில் 1949 இல் வெளியிடப்பட்டது.
4. "சரிந்த சாம்ராஜ்யம்", பகுத்தறிவு பாசறை பதிப்பகத்தில் 1950இல் முதல் பதிப்பாகவும், 1953இல் இரண்டாம் பதிப்பாகவும் வெளியிடப்பட்டது. மராட்டிய மன்னனாக திகழ்ந்த வீர சிவாஜி பற்றிய நூல்.
5. "இந்திய அரசியல் சட்டம்", மக்கள் மன்றம் என்னும் பதிப்பகத்தில் 1951இல் வெளியிடப்பட்டது.
6. "அஞ்சா நெஞ்சன் வால்டேர்", மக்கள் மன்றம் பதிப்பகம் 1956இல் வெளியிட்டது.
7. "தலையங்க இலக்கியம் ", வசந்தா பதிப்பகம், முதல் பதிப்பு - 2009. போர்வாள் பத்திரிகையின் சிறப்பான 30 தலையங்கங்கள் அடங்கிய புத்தகம்.
8. "வாழ்க்கை பாதை", அலமு பதிப்பகம், 2004. தன் வரலாற்று நூல், இரண்டு தொகுதிகள்.

=== English Books ===
1. O. Thanikachalam Chettiar - the Great Leader of Social Justice"- A Biography of O. Thanikachalam Chettiar who had served the Tamil people as a top ranking leader of the Justice Party) இது, அவர் ஆங்கிலத்தில் எழுதிய நூல்.
2. பேராசிரியர் நர்க்சால் (Professor Nurkse) இயற்றப்பட்ட நூலை ("Problems of Capital Formation in Under Developed Countries), "வளர்ச்சி குறைந்த நாடுகளின் முதலாக்கச் சிக்கல்கள்" என்னும் பெயர் படைத்த தமிழ் நூலாய் மொழியாக்கம் செய்தார்.

== Books published on the life of M. Ilanchezhian ==
1. "ஒரு போர்வாளின் கதை" - நூல் ஆசிரியர் பேராசிரியர் இராம. வேணுகோபால்; பல்லவி பதிப்பகம், 2001
2. "இதழாளர் இளஞ்செழியன்" - நூல் ஆசிரியர் டாக்டர் தொ. சின்னபழனி; சௌபாக்கியம் பதிப்பகம், 2008
3. ஆய்வு தலைப்பு "திராவிட இயக்க வரலாற்றில் போர்வாள் இதழின் பங்கு". ஆராய்சியாளர் டாக்டர் தொ. சின்னபழனி, ஆய்வின் நெறியாளர் முனைவர் பேராசிரியர் பா. கந்தசாமி.

== Other References ==
1. http://www.sudoc.fr/188685200
2. https://ta.wikisource.org/s/91ct - "சமுதாய விடுதலைப் போரில் திராவிடர் இயக்க இதழ்கள்" In this article, the 7th part talks about "Porvaal" magazine.
3. https://ta.wikisource.org/s/9aea - முடியரசன் தமிழ் வழிபாடு என்னும் நூலில் கவியரசு முடியரசன் தான் "போர்வாள்" பத்திரிகைக்கு எழுதியுள்ளேன் என்று குறிப்பிடுள்ளார். In this article, poet Mudiyarasan says the he has written for the magazine "Porvaal"
