= M. V. Venkatram =

Indian writer and translator

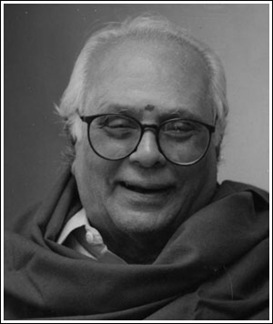
- Born: 18 May 1920; Kumbakonam, Tamil Nadu
- Died: 14 January 2000 (aged 79)
- Occupation: Writer
- Awards: Sahitya Akademi Award (1993)

M. V. Venkatram (18 May 1920 – 14 January 2000), was a Tamil, writer and translator from Tamil Nadu, India.

== Biography ==
Venkatram was born in Kumbakonam in a Saurashtra Brahmin family. He obtained a B.A. degree in Economics and was involved in silk Zari business. He first started publishing in the literary magazine Manikodi in the 1930s, while he was still a college student. He was influenced by Ku. Pa. Rajagopalan and was part of a literary circle that included Karichan Kunju (R. Narayanaswami), Thi. Janakiraman, Thiruloka Seetaram, Dhenuka, Thanjai Prakash, Na.Vichuvanathan, C.M.Muthu and Podhikaiverkpan. His works have been published in magazines like Kaalamohini, Grama Ooozhiyan and Sivaji. He also ran a literary magazine named Thenee briefly. He has written over two hundred short stories and novels. Nithyakanni Kathukal and Velivithee are his most noted works. He also wrote more than 60 short biographies for Palaniappa Brothers and translated over 10 books for the National Book Trust of India. In 1993, he was awarded the Sahitya Akademi Award for Tamil for novel Kathukal (lit. Ears).

== Partial bibliography ==
=== Novels ===
- Nithyakanni(1955)
- Uyirin yathirai (1957)
- Iruttu (1957)
- Arumbu (1965)
- Velvithee (1963)
- Oru pen poradukiral (1975)
- Kathukal (1992)

=== Short story collections ===
- Mallikai vasam (1964)
- Sukam enge (1966)
- Kuyili (1964)
- Varavum selavum (1964)
- Vyasar padaitha penmanikal (1966)
- Mohini (1964)

=== Translations ===
- Rajani Palme Dutt's India Today

== Centenary ==
In connection with his centenary (18 May 2020) among others, the following articles appeared, by way of tribute to him.

- The centenary celebrations of M.V.Venkatram
- M.V.Venkatram in his centenary
- The continuous rain known as M.V.V.
- On the novel Kathukal of M.V.V.
- Special commemoration volume by Adavi on M.V.Venkaram

== See also ==
- List of Sahitya Akademi Award winners for Tamil
- List of Indian writers
- List of Tamil-language writers
