= Vyaamoham =

- Directed by: K. G. George
- Written by: Dr. Pavithran (dialogues); K. G. George (dialogues)
- Screenplay by: Dr. Pavithran; K. G. George; Rajeevnath
- Starring: Adoor Bhasi; Lakshmi; Mohan Sharma; Janardanan
- Cinematography: Anandakkuttan
- Edited by: Ravi
- Music by: Ilaiyaraaja
- Production company: Abhayam Movies
- Distributed by: Abhayam Movies
- Release date: 4 May 1978
- Country: India
- Language: Malayalam

Vyaamoham (lit. 'Craving') is a 1978 Indian Malayalam-language film, directed by K. G. George. The film stars Adoor Bhasi, Lakshmi, Mohan Sharma and Janardanan in the lead roles. This was Ilaiyaraaja's debut Malayalam film score.

It is a remake of the Tamil film Policekaran Magal, itself based on a play.

== Cast ==
- Adoor Bhasi
- Lakshmi
- Mohan Sharma
- Janardanan

== Soundtrack ==
The music was composed by Ilaiyaraaja and the lyrics were written by Dr Pavithran.

No.	Song	Singers	Lyrics	Length (m:ss)
1	"Neeyo Njaano"	S. Janaki, P. Jayachandran	Dr. Pavithran	
2	"Oro Poovum Viriyum Pulari Pon"	Selma George	Dr. Pavithran	
3	"Poovaadikalil" (D)	K. J. Yesudas, S. Janaki	Dr. Pavithran	
4	"Poovaadikalil" (F)	S. Janaki	Dr. Pavithran	
