= Seeni Viswanathan =

Tamil researcher known for compiling Subramania Bharati's works

- சீனி. விசுவநாதன்
- Born: 22 November 1934 (age 91); Paramathi Velur, Namakkal district, Tamil Nadu, India
- Occupations: Researcher, writer, editor
- Known for: Compiling the complete works of Subramania Bharati
- Notable work: Kaala Varisaipadi Bharathi Padaippugal (கால வரிசைப்படுத்தப்பட்ட பாரதி படைப்புகள்)
- Awards: Padma Shri (2025); Bharathi Award (2020); Tamil Nadu Government Bharathiyar Award (2004)

Seeni Viswanathan (Tamil: சீனி விஸ்வநாதன், born 22 November 1934) is an Indian Tamil researcher, writer, and editor, primarily known for compiling and publishing the complete works of the renowned Tamil poet and freedom fighter, Subramania Bharati. His extensive research spanning over six decades was published as a comprehensive multi-volume chronological compilation of Bharati's writings. For his contributions, he was awarded the Padma Shri, India's fourth-highest civilian honour, in 2025.

== Early life ==
Viswanathan was born on 22 November 1934 in Paramathi Velur, Namakkal district, Tamil Nadu, to P.V. Srinivasan and Kamalambal. His father worked in the revenue department. His interest in Subramania Bharati began during his school days when he came across a book on the poet by Kalki Krishnamurthy, 'Bharati Pirandhar.'

== Career and research on Bharati ==
Viswanathan research spans over six decades, starting from the 1960s, to researching Subramania Bharati. His work involved meticulously collecting and archiving Bharati's vast output, which included poems, essays, journalistic writings, stories, and letters, often scattered across various old publications and manuscripts. He sought out early editions of Bharati's works and copies of journals to which Bharati contributed, such as Swadesamitran, Chakravarthini, and India.

A significant aspect of his research methodology was ensuring textual and factual accuracy, often providing footnotes on textual variations found in different editions. He collaborated with Bharati's stepbrother, C. Viswanathan (1896–1984), who provided valuable information and materials for a biography, a task eventually entrusted to Seeni Viswanathan.

His magnum opus is the compilation Kaala Varisaipadi Bharathi Padaippugal (கால வரிசைப்படுத்தப்பட்ட பாரதி படைப்புகள்; Bharati's Works in Chronological Order). This 23-volume set, published by Alliance Publishers, arranges Bharati's known works chronologically, spanning approximately 15,000 pages. The volumes include commentaries, annotations, background information, documents, and philosophical analysis to provide context for Bharati's writings. The compendium was formally released by the Prime Minister of India, Narendra Modi, on 11 December 2024. It is estimated to contain around 95% of Bharati's known works.

Throughout his career, Viswanathan authored or edited numerous other books related to Bharati, establishing himself as a leading authority on the poet. The poet and lyricist Kannadasan reportedly referred to him as a "veritable Bharati library".

== Selected works ==
- Thamizhagam Thandha Mahakavi (தமிழகம் தந்த மகாகவி; The Great Poet Given by Tamil Nadu): An anthology of reminiscences about Bharati by contemporaries.
- Bharathi Noolppeyark Kovai (பாரதி நூற்பெயர்க் கோவை; Bibliography of Bharati's Books): A detailed bibliography of books by and about Bharati.
- Bharathi Thedalgal: Sila Ninaivalaigal (பாரதி தேடல்கள்: சில நினைவலைகள்; Bharati Searches: Some Memoirs).
- Kaala Varisaipadi Bharathi Padaippugal (கால வரிசைப்படுத்தப்பட்ட பாரதி படைப்புகள்; Bharati's Works in Chronological Order) (23 Volumes, 2024).

Vishwanathan has authored more than 50 books on Bharati.

== Awards and recognition ==
- Padma Shri (2025)
- Bharathi Award (2020)
- Bharathi Memorial Centenary Award (2021)
- Best Book (Life History/Autobiography category) (2004) for Bharathi Thedalgal: Sila Ninaivalaigal — Tamil Nadu Government Award
- Bharathiyar Award (2004) — Tamil Nadu Government

== See also ==
- List of Indian writers
- List of Tamil-language writers
