= Thangam Krishnamurthy =

Tamil feminist writer

Thangam Krishnamurthy (Tamil: தங்கம் கிருஷ்ணமூர்த்தி; born 1956), is a Tamil feminist writer from Tamil Nadu, India.

== Life ==
Thangam Krishnamurthy was born into a Brahmin family in Tamil Nadu, India, and began publishing in her forties.

== Career ==
Her career as a writer started in 1997. Many of her social/spiritual stories are published in Tamil language magazines Aval Vikatan, Kungumam, Kalai magal, Kanmani, Devi, Mangaiyar Malar, Manjula Rameshin Snekithi, Idhayam Pesukirathu, Gnana Aalayam, Sakthi Vikatan, Om Saravana Bava, Gopura Dharisanam, Gopura Deepam, Krishna Vijayam, Gnana Bhoomi & Dhinakaran.

=== Short stories ===
Her short story titled "Kavusalya Oru Puthir" in "Kalaimagal" (1999) was selected as muthirai sirukathai.

=== Spiritual stories ===
Currently, she is on the editorial board of "Anbu paalam", headed by writer Jayakanthan.

=== Story collections ===
- Aanmiga kataigal (Contemporary stories)
- Jai veera aanjeneya
- Nesam marapathillai nenjam (The heart doesn't forget love)
- Sugamaana sumaigal (Pleasant burdens)
