= Thottiyude Makan =

1947 novel by Thakazhi Sivasankara Pillai

Thottiyude Makan (തോട്ടിയുടെ മകൻ) (Scavenger's Son)
- Author: Thakazhi Sivasankara Pillai
- Translator: R. E. Asher
- Language: Malayalam
- Genre: Novel
- Publisher: DC Books
- Publication date: 1947
- Publication place: India
- Pages: 126

Thottiyude Makan (തോട്ടിയുടെ മകൻ, English: Scavenger's Son) is a 1947 Malayalam novel written by Thakazhi Sivasankara Pillai. The novel portrays three generations of a working-class family engaged in Alleppey as scavengers. When it first appeared in India in 1947, the novel caused great controversy in its portrayal of the untouchables as people with real feelings.

== Plot summary ==
In the novel Thottiyude Makan, we witness the story of three generations of thottis, cleaners of night soil. The first two generations struggle to attain individuality; they suffer and die unfulfilled, oppressed and ostracised, but their struggles enable Mohanan, the third-generation thotti, to assert his individual dignity and lead his fellow untouchables to rise against oppression and prejudice.

== Background ==
After completing his law degree, Thakazhi joined Keralakesari (a magazine run by Kesari Balakrishna Pillai) as journalist. He also practiced under P. Parameshwaran Pillai in Ambalapuzha Munsiff court. During this period he met with people's problem which was the inspiration to write Thottiyude Makan.

== Translations ==
The novel was translated into English by R. E. Asher under the title Scavenger's Son. Tamil author Sundara Ramasami has translated the novel into Tamil.
