= Konangi =

Tamil Indian writer

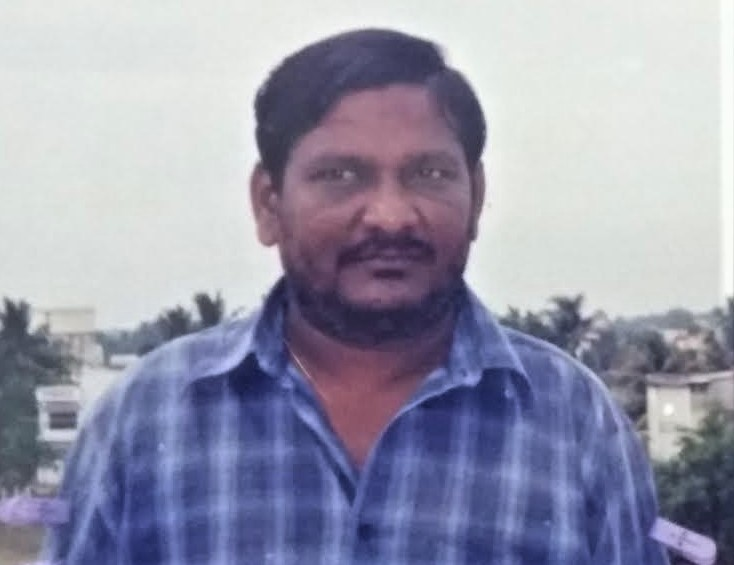
- Born: Ilangovan; 1 November 1956 (age 69); Nenmeni Mettupatti, Tamil Nadu
- Writing career
- Notable works: Paazhi, Pidhiraa, Tha
- Literary movement: Modern

Konangi (born 1 November 1956) is the pen name of the Tamil writer Ilangovan. He is the maternal grandson of the Tamil playwright, lyricist, writer and Freedom fighter Madurakavi Baskaradoss. His father is the Tamil writer Shanmugam and his mother is Saraswathi. His elder brother is the Tamil short-story writer S. Tamilselvan and his younger brother is Murugaboopathy a contemporary Tamil playwright. He grew up in Naagalapuram, Bodinayakanur, and Nenmeni Mettupatti, and he currently lives in Kovilpatti, Tamil Nadu.

== Career ==
Described as the most important Tamil voice since Pudumaipithan, Konangi has published six short story collections and three novels. His works belongs to the less popular serious literature genre in Tamil which is mostly published in literary magazines and only occasionally in magazines and newspapers with wider circulation.

Konangi's first short story veechu (வீச்சு) was published in Thaamarai, a Tamil magazine in 1980, and from then on he went to create some of the most original short stories in the Tamil language. His stories are characterised by very dense images, a tight narrative style with a vocabulary like no other bringing a ritualistic shade to the use of the Tamil language. His works often pushes and breaks the limits of fiction in Tamil literature by abandonment of the conventions of plot and character construction.

Konangi quit his job in March 1988 and started his own little magazine, Kal Kudhirai, in October 1988 in the Kalrayan Hills. The magazine continues to publish serious contemporary Tamil fiction, poetry, reviews and translations. Konangi's earlier short stories dealt with the issues of alienation, effects of urbanisation in villages leading to farmer suicides, childhood memories, rural tales and other metaphysical themes. He later experimented in fiction writing a wide range of genres including Surrealistic and Magical stories of dreamscapes. His previous novels, such as Paazhi and Pidhiraa, dealt with Jainism and with a wide range of subjects using the reference of the five ancient Sangam landscapes respectively. His latest novel, Tha, was published in January 2013.

== Personal life ==
Despite receiving enormous acknowledgements for his literary outputs, Konangi stays away from the media.

== Bibliography ==
=== தொகுக்கப்படாத கதைகள் ===
- வீச்சு – தாமரை – 1980.
- விளக்குச்சரம் – சிகரம் சிற்றிதழ் – 1980.
- தர்ம சக்கரம்

=== முதல் சில சிறுகதைகள் ===
- இருட்டு – சிகரம் – October 1980.
- கருப்பு ரயில் – தேடல் – October 1981.
- மதினிமார்கள் கதை – மீட்சி – 1982.

=== Short story collections ===
- மதினிமார்கள் கதை – அன்னம் வெளியீடு
- கொல்லனின் ஆறு பெண்மக்கள்.
- பொம்மைகள் உடைபடும் நகரம்.
- பட்டுப்பூச்சிகள் உறங்கும் மூன்றாம் ஜாமம்
- உப்புக்கத்தியில் மறையும் சிறுத்தை.
- இருள்வ மௌத்திகம் .
- சலூன் நாற்காலியில் சுழன்றபடி.
- வெள்ளரிப் பெண்(Anthology).

=== Novellas ===
- கைத்தடி கேட்ட நூறு கேள்விகள் – A novella that won the prize in Kanaiyaazhi.
- அப்பாவின் குகையில் இருக்கிறேன் – ( I am in my fathers cave)
- தழும்புகள் சிவந்த அணங்கு நிலம்.

=== Novels ===
- பாழி – 2000
- பிதிரா – 2004
- த – 2013
- நீர் வளரி - 2020

=== பிதிரா ===
Pidhira was released in 2004 and is largely a novel that was less denser and more accessible than the earlier work paazhi. It had its sections based on the five Tamil sangam landscapes . The first part 'mullai' was written as a fiction based on the travels in Andhra Pradesh.

=== Tha (த) ===
Tha, published in January 2013 (released in Dhanushkodi), is an imaginary work of lyrical prose dealing with the displacement of Northeast Indians, Samaritans, Veenai Dhanammal, tales from the Silappatikaram, the music of the Gramophone Company India, Ancient Tamil music, Saraswathi Mahal Library, the Alipore Jail, the mythology of the Samaritans, the works of Socrates, the landscape of Nagapattinam, the mythological stories of Ravana, HMS Blake, Zen, Kalamkari paintings and other elements in a fictional universe called Tha. The novel includes allegories, folk tales, oral histories, ritual details, archetypes, fables, anecdotes, parables, tall tales, legends, and ghost stories, making it a diverse work.

=== Non fiction ===
- காவேரியின் பூர்வ காதை
- பாட்டியின் குரல் வளையை காப்பாற்றி வைத்திருக்கிறேன்(நேர்காணல்).

=== On novels ===
Opposed to other novels in literature, Konangi has his own conventions in all aspects of the building of a novel. His works are usually made up of fragments and it distorts the experience of its main characters, presenting events outside of chronological order and attempts to disrupt the idea of characters with unified and stable personalities. It also has the characteristics of lack of an obvious plot, minimal development of character, variations in time sequence, experiments with vocabulary and syntax, and alternative endings and beginnings. Due to these aspects his works are often thought to be incomprehensible and chaotic despite being implied the other way.

=== Trivia ===
- Took his pen name from a poetry line by Subramanya Bharathi.
- Wrote the introduction to பாழி at Sanchi, Vidisha, Ajanta and Ellora caves.
- Fictionalized Mozart's funeral, the works of Paul Gauguin and Rembrandt in short stories.
- Cites Mouni, Na.Muthusamy (the short story called Vandi), poomani, Rajendra Chozhan and Vannanilavan as early influences.
- Calls Nakulan as a major influence in the craft of novels. Has written an inventive short story about nakulan which was later translated into English.
- An orator par excellence (mostly on Ex tempore) but rarely attends any public literary meetings.
- Have acted in plays. Known plays include Japthi.
- Can Paint. Was in earlier days a painter.
- Never Married.

=== Comments on works include ===
- Criticism on the overtly Baroque style.
- A stylist with high sense of the visual.
- Difficulties in plot summary.
- Deliberately obscuring the plot using language.
- Total abandonment of reason for imagination.
- Like poetry, uses words and images which can mean several, often contradictory, things at once.
- Dense weave of a language designed as much to shield the plot summary than to reveal them.
- Usage of a lexicon of old and obscure Tamil words.
- New readers who enter the Tamil literary landscape have often been made to believe about the works of Konangi as unapproachable, chaotic and incomprehensible by the general opinions of the media. Due to this some of Konangi's works (novels) often remain as a vast verbal labyrinth of extraordinary images waiting to be deciphered.

=== Quotes ===
Sayings quoted below appeared in magazines and from his own works and interviews.

- You have to become a bird in order to understand a tree.
- Art has no relation with conscious intelligence. It is inherently a fragile thing. Its origins are unknown and at its center are clouds of cold blackness. The aesthetic experience at its summit becomes invisible and disrupts the readers perseverance in understanding it. [See: The imminence of a revelation that does not occur.]
- While my characters are highly instinctive, my stories take birth from the sub-conscious and often oscillate into the world of unconscious.
- My stories are born out of blindness and not seeing too far ahead.
- Sculpting has a direct relation with the evolution of the language of my later stories.
- The traditional idea of Plot essentially limits the possibilities of all fiction.
- Art is like the process of weaving.
- In travel, like music the land of dreams appear out of nowhere and follows us.
- Art has nothing to do with either wisdom or understanding. It doesn't have purpose nor intention. Its on its own.
- Fictional landscapes resembles waterscapes in general and fiction is born at the moment, the fusion of two unknown creatures that lives inside it occurs.
- Stories are living things and they have souls residing inside them.
- Beauty when found is often accompanied with a feeling of sense of terror.
- I’ve inherited a tradition where butterflies want to sing, elephants want to dance, alchemists, sorcerers and witches want to overwork, and the storyteller creates landscapes which have no association to any town, city or country, and is yet not alien.

== See also ==
- Baroque
- Mr Difficult
- Antinovel
- Stream of consciousness (narrative mode)
- Nonlinear narrative
- Magic realism
- Automatic writing
- Postmodern literature
- Reader-response criticism
- Fiction-writing modes
