= Policekaran Magal =

1962 film by C. V. Sridhar

- Theatrical release poster
- Directed by: C. V. Sridhar
- Screenplay by: C. V. Sridhar
- Based on: Policekaran Magal by B. S. Ramiah
- Produced by: P. V. Sathyam; V. Nanjundan
- Starring: Balaji; Muthuraman; Vijayakumari; Santha Kumari; Pushpalatha
- Cinematography: A. Vincent
- Edited by: N. M. Shankar
- Music by: Viswanathan–Ramamoorthy
- Production company: Chitrakala Productions
- Release date: 7 September 1962
- Running time: 156 minutes
- Country: India
- Language: Tamil

Policekaran Magal (transl. The Policeman's Daughter) is a 1962 Indian Tamil-language drama film written and directed by C. V. Sridhar. Based on B. S. Ramiah's play of the same name, it stars Balaji, Muthuraman, Vijayakumari, Santha Kumari and Pushpalatha. The film was released on 7 September 1962 and was a success. It was later remade in Telugu as Constable Koothuru (1963) and in Malayalam as Vyaamoham (1978).

== Plot ==
Kumarasami, an honest police constable, has a son Chinnaiah and a daughter Janaki. Prabhu, son of a rich affluent person is a friend of Chinnaiah who often visit his house. Prabhu falls in love with Janaki to which she equally reciprocates. She meets Prabhu secretly without the knowledge of both her father and brother.Prabhu meets his love in a temple and promises to marry her. One day, Prabhu and his friends gamble and are caught by the police.

Meanwhile, Prabhu's father plans to marry his son to one of his relatives. Prabhu initially discards this proposal but accepts after coming to know that he will be deprived of his father's wealth if he does not marry the girl arranged by his father. Janaki is shocked to hear this and finally tells her relationship with Prabhu to her parents. When Chinnaiah visits Prabhu's house to seek justice, Prabhu reiterates that Janaki is completely unknown to him. Janaki health begins to deteriorate and despite Prabhu's selfish motive, she prays for his good health.

Police arrest Prabhu for the gambling at his house and Janaki testifies as an alibi. A now regretful Prabhu comes to marry Janaki, but is too late. Janaki's health completely deteriorates and she eventually dies.

== Cast ==
Male cast

- Balaji as Prabhu
- Muthuraman as Chinnaiah
- Sahasranamam as Constable Kumarasami
- Nagesh as Servant
- Muthaiah as Rajagopal
- Ramanathan
- Raghavan as Mallika's father
- Karikol Raj as Janaki's uncle
- K. Nataraj as Advocate
- Veerappan as Somu
- Chandrababu as Maari
- Film News Anandan as police photographer (uncredited)

Female cast

- Vijayakumari as Janaki
- Santha Kumari as Amrtham
- Pushpalatha as Mallika
- Manorama as Maari's Fiancée
- Sakunthala as Malathi

== Production ==
Policekaran Magal was based on the stage play of the same name written by B. S. Ramiah. S. V. Sahasranamam and R. Muthuraman who were part of the play reprised their roles in the film. C. R. Vijayakumari played the titular daughter of Sahasranamam's character, a policeman, while K. Balaji played a youth who cheats the policeman's daughter. The dialogues were written by Thanjai N. Ramaiah Dass.

== Soundtrack ==
The soundtrack was composed by Viswanathan–Ramamoorthy (a duo consisting of M. S. Viswanathan and T. K. Ramamoorthy) while the lyrics written by Kannadasan. The song "Ponn Enbean Siru" is set in the Carnatic raga known as Darbari Kanada. The song "Nilavukku Enmel Ennadi Kobam" attained popularity and is the title of a film released in 2025.

Track listing
No.	Title	Singer(s)	Length
1.	"Nilavukku Enmel Ennadi Kobam"	P. B. Sreenivas	03:36
2.	"Indha Mandrathil Odi Varum"	P. B. Sreenivas, S. Janaki	03:32
3.	"Pon Enbaen Siru"	P. B. Sreenivas, S. Janaki	03:31
4.	"Aandrondru Ponaal"	P. B. Sreenivas, S. Janaki	03:21
5.	"Poranthaalum Aambalayaa"	J. P. Chandrababu, L. R. Eswari	03:08
6.	"Indha Mandrathil Odi Varum" (Pathos)	P. B. Sreenivas, S. Janaki	03:00
7.	"Kannile Neer"	Sirkazhi Govindarajan, S. Janaki	03:31
8.	"Poo Sumanthu Pogiral"	Sirkazhi Govindarajan	03:08
Total length:			22:59

== Release ==
Policekaran Magal was released on 7 September 1962, and emerged a commercial success.

== Remakes ==
Policekaran Magal was remade in Telugu as Constable Koothuru (1963), and in Malayalam as Vyaamoham (1978).
