= C. S. Lakshmi =

Indian feminist writer (born 1944)

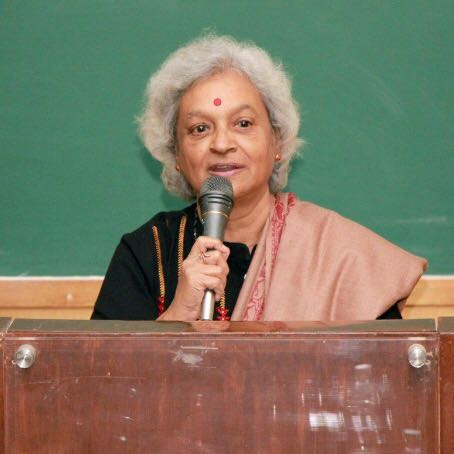
- Ambai
- Born: 1944 (age 81–82); Coimbatore, Madras Province, British India (now Tamil Nadu, India)
- Citizenship: Indian
- Education: Jawaharlal Nehru University, New Delhi (PhD); Madras Christian College, Chennai
- Occupations: Author, researcher of women's studies
- Spouse: Vishnu Mathur
- Writing career
- Pen name: Ambai
- Language: Tamil, English
- Period: 1962–present
- Genres: Short story, novel, novella
- Subject: Feminism
- Notable works: Siragukal Muriyum; Veetin mulaiyil oru samaiyalarai Kaatil Oru Maan
- Notable awards: Sahitya Academy Award (2021)

C. S. Lakshmi (born 1944) is an Indian feminist writer and independent researcher in women's studies from India. She writes under the pseudonym Ambai.

== Personal life ==
Lakshmi was born in Coimbatore, Tamil Nadu in 1944. She grew up in Mumbai and Bangalore. She obtained her Bachelor of Arts from Bangalore University, Master of Arts from Madras Christian College and her PhD from Jawaharlal Nehru University, New Delhi. She draws great inspiration from her mother who asked her to study in Chennai if it would contribute to a change of any extent in her life. Her dissertation was on American policy towards refugees fleeing Hungary due to the failed revolution of 1956. After completing her education, she worked as a school teacher and college lecturer in Tamil Nadu. She is married to Vishnu Mathur, a film maker, and lives in Mumbai.

== Writing career ==
In 1962, Lakshmi published her first work Nandimalai Charalilae (lit. At Nandi Hills) – written when she was still a teenager. Her first serious work of fiction was the Tamil novel Andhi Maalai (lit. Twilight) which came out in 1966. It received the "Kalaimagal Narayanaswamy Aiyar" Prize. She received critical acclaim with the short story Siragukal muriyum (lit. Wings will be broken) (1967) published in the literary magazine Kanaiyazhi. This story was later published in book form as a part of short story collection under the same name in 1976. The same year she was awarded a two-year fellowship to study the work of Tamil women writers. The research work was published as The Face behind the mask (Advent Books) in 1984. In 1988, her second Tamil short story collection titled Veetin mulaiyil oru samaiyalarai (lit. A kitchen in the corner of the house) was published. This established her reputation as a major short story writer. Her work is characterised by her feminism, an eye for detail, and a sense of irony. Some of her works – A Purple Sea (1992) and In A Forest, A Deer (2006) – have been translated English by Lakshmi Holmström. In 2006, she (along with Lakshmi Holmström) won the Vodafone Crossword Book Award (in the Indian language fiction translation category) for In a Forest, A Deer. For her contributions to Tamil literature, she received the 2008 Iyal Virudhu (Lifetime Achievement Award) awarded by the Canada-based Tamil Literary Garden. In 2021, she won the Sahitya Akademi Award, India's highest literary honor, for her collection of short stories Sivappu Kazhuthudan Oru Pachai Paravai.

She got Shakti Bhatt Literary Award and Tata Literature Lifetime Achievement Award in the year 2023.

== Academic career ==
Lakshmi has been an independent researcher in the field of women's studies for over thirty years. She uses the pen name Ambai for publishing Tamil fiction and her real name (as Dr. C. S. Lakshmi) for publishing her research work and other articles in newspapers like The Hindu and The Times of India and in journals like Economic and Political Weekly. In 1992, she was a visiting fellow in the University of Chicago's Institute for Culture and Consciousness. She was instrumental in the establishment of Roja Muthiah Research Library (RMRL) by persuading the University to acquire Roja Muthaiah Chettiar's collection of books and other published material. She has been a research Officer in the Indian Council of Historical Research and a college lecturer in New Delhi. In the 1990s, she worked in two research projects – Illustrated Social History of Women in Tamil Nadu sponsored by the Ford Foundation and An Idiom of Silence: An Oral History and Pictorial Study sponsored by the Homi J. Bhabha fellowship. The resulting research has been published as two volumes of the Seven seas & seven mountains series. The first volume, The Singer and the Song (2000), is a collection of interviews with women musicians and the second volume, Mirrors and Gestures (2003), is a collection of interviews with women dancers. In 1988, Lakshmi founded SPARROW (Sound and Picture Archives for Research on Women) a non-governmental organisation (NGO) for documenting and archiving the work of female writers and artists. SPARROW has published a number of books on women artists and writers. As of 2009, she continues to be the organisation's Director and a member of its board of trustees. She is a current member of the University of Michigan's Global Feminisms Project. She considers herself as a "feminist who has lived without compromise".

== Bibliography ==
=== Books in English ===
- The Face behind the mask : Women in Tamil literature, Stosius Inc/Advent Books Division (1984)
- A Purple Sea (Translated by Lakshmi Holmstorm), Affiliated East-West Press (1992)
- Body blows: women, violence, and survival : three plays, Seagull Books (2000)
- Seven seas & seven mountains : Volume 1 : The Singer and the Song — Conversations with Women Musicians, Kali for Women (2000)
- Seven seas & seven mountains : Volume 2 : Mirrors and Gestures – Conversations with Women Dancers, Kali for Women (2003)
- (ed.) The Unhurried City – Writings on Chennai, Kali for Women (2003)
- In A Forest, A Deer: Stories By Ambai (Translated by Lakshmi Holmstorm), Katha (2006)
- A Meeting on the Andheri Overbridge: Sudha Gupta Investigates, Juggernaut (2016)

=== Books in Tamil ===
- Nandimalai Charalilae (lit. At Nandi Hills) (1962)
- Andhi Malai (lit. Twilight) (1967)
- Sirakukal muriyum (lit. Wings will be broken), Kalachuvadu (1976)
- Veetin mulaiyil oru samaiyalarai (lit. A kitchen in the corner of the house), cre-A (1988)
- Ambai : Kalacchuvadu Nerkanalgal (lit. Kalachuvadu Interviews with Ambai), Kalachuvadu (1998)
- Kaatil Oru Maan (lit. A Deer in the Forest), Kalachuvadu (2000)
- Varrum eriyin meengal (lit. Fish in a drying pond), Kalachuvadu (2007)
- Sivappu Kazhuthudan Oru Pachai Paravai Kalachuvadu (2018). Sahitya Akademi Award winner

== See also ==
- List of Sahitya Akademi Award winners for Tamil
- List of Indian writers
- List of Tamil-language writers
