= K. P. Rajagopalan =

Indian journalist

Kumbakonam P. Rajagopalan (January,1902–27.4.1944), known by his pen name Ku. Pa. Ra. was a Tamil writer, translator and journalist. He is linked with the Manikodi tradition of Tamil writers. He has been compared with his co-writers Pudumaipithan, Mowni. M. V. Venkatram and Na. Pichamurthy. His short stories are clear and bold. His subject deals more of the hidden feelings of women on love and sex.

His sister, Ku.Pa.Sethu, was also a writer.

== Early life ==
Rajagopalan was born in 1902 in Kumbakonam, Madras Presidency. He had his education in Kumbakonam and joined the services of the Madras government. However, he was soon affected by cataract and was forced to quit his government job.

== Career ==
In 1937, when sight was restored to his eyes after a successful operation, he moved to Madras in order to commence a career as a professional writer. For a time, he worked for a daily called Tamil Nadu along with C. S. Chellappa.

== Legacy ==
Senthooram Jagadish produced a documentary film concerning Rajagopalan which was aired on Kalaignar TV Seithigal channel in 2009.
