= C. S. Chellappa =

Tamil writer, journalist and Indian independence movement activist

- Born: Cinnamanur Subramaniam Chellappa; 29 September 1912; Chinnamanur, Madurai District, Madras Presidency, British India (now in Theni District, Tamil Nadu, India
- Died: 18 December 1998 (aged 86); Chennai, Tamil Nadu, India
- Education: B.A economics
- Occupations: Writer, journalist
- Spouse: Meenakshi.
- Parent(s): Subramania Iyer (Father), Alamelu (Mother)
- Writing career
- Pen name: C. S. Chellappa
- Language: Tamil.
- Subject: Literature
- Notable awards: Sahitya Akademi Award (2001)
- Movements: Gandhian, Indian independence movement

Cinnamanur Subramaniam Chellappa (Tamil: சி. சு. செல்லப்பா) (29 September 1912 – 18 December 1998) was a Sahitya Akademi Award winning Tamil writer, journalist, Gandhian and Indian independence movement activist.

== Biography ==
Chellappa was born in Chinnamanur on 29 September 1912 to Subramania Iyer and Alamelu. Subramania Iyer was a government employee and nationalist.He grew up in his maternal uncle's native Vathalagundu. Chellappa did his schooling in Tuticorin and obtained a degree in B.A economics as Madura College in Madurai.Having engaged with the Indian independence movement from his school days in Tuticorin—initially inspired by armed revolutionaries like Bhagat Singh and Subhas Chandra Bose before embracing Mahatma Gandhi's nonviolence and He participated in satyagraha at Vathalagundu was courted arrest on 10 January 1941 and served a six-month imprisonment.

== Literary career ==
Chellappa began writing in 1934 and when he published his first story Margazhi Malar. .He belonged to the "Manikodi" literary movement along with Pudhumaipithan, Ku Pa Ra, Va. Ramasamy, N. Pichamoorthi and A. N. Sivaraman. He also founded Ezhuthu, a literary magazine. Over a 62-year literary career spanning novels, short stories, articles, Chellappa authored over 100 short stories and notably completed The Thirst for Freedom, a massive 1,650-page, three-volume epic novel set against the backdrop of the freedom struggle in Tamil Nadu and Madurai. To self-publish this monumental work ahead of the golden jubilee of Indian Independence, he famously sold his wife's jewellery to raise funds. A vocal critic of post-independence political moral decline, Chellappa has consistently advocated for a return to Gandhian spiritualized politics, truth, nonviolence, and rural self-reliance.He was posthumously awarded Sahitya Akademi Award for his novel Suthanthira Thagam in 2001.

== Partial bibliography ==
=== Novels ===
- Vaadivasal (1958)
- Jeevanamsam
- Suthanthira Thagam

=== Plays ===
- Muraipenn

=== Literary criticism ===
- Ramaiyyavin sirukathai kalam
- Oothupathi pul
- Mayathachan

== See also ==
- List of Sahitya Akademi Award winners for Tamil
- List of Indian writers
- List of Tamil-language writers
