= N. Pichamoorthi =

Indian poet

Venkata Mahalingam
- Born: 15 August 1900; Kumbakonam, Tanjore District, Madras Presidency, British India (now Thanjavur District, Tamil Nadu, India)
- Died: 4 December 1976 (aged 76); Madras (now Chennai), Tamil Nadu, India
- Occupations: Poet, short story writer, Novelist
- Spouse: Saradha
- Children: Alamelu, Rajalakshmi, Meenakshi (Daughters)
- Parent(s): Natesanar (Father) & Kamakshiammal (Mother)
- Writing career
- Pen name: N.Pichamoorthi
- Language: Tamil

Venkata Mahalingam (15 August 1900 – 4 December 1976), who wrote under the name of N. Pichamoorthi, was an Indian poet and writer. He is considered father of free verse (Puthu Kavidai) in Tamil. He wrote more than 127 short stories, 11 stage plays and a couple of novels. He was a lawyer by profession and also worked as editor in magazines.

== Biography ==
N. Pichamoorthi was born in Kumbakonam to Natesa Dikshitar and Lakshmi ammal as Vankata Mahalingam on 15 August 1900. He was the fourth child and the only child to survive as the first three children died during infancy. His parents being deeply religious named him "Pichai" Begger as they believed the death god would spare him as this name is very ugly. As the days went by, his name turned to Pichamoorthi.

In 1925, Pichamoorthi married Saradha. Between 1924 and 1938 he practised as a lawyer in the Lower court of Kumbakonam. He also worked as Editor and Sub-editor of several magazines during his lifetime. He was considered the father of free verse in Tamil (Puthu Kavithai). His penname is revathi and wrote short stories in this name; he was inspired by Subramania Bharati who was contributing to free verse kind of poetry. Pichamoorthi's works was inspired by literature and poetry works from the West where free verse poetry was already in existence. Pichamoorthi also wrote short stories with simple themes based on social happenings which had deep philosophical meaning.

In 2004, his works were nationalised by the Government of Tamil Nadu.

== Bibliography ==
=== Books ===
- Pathinettam Perukku – 1944
- Kali – 1946
- Kudumba Ragsiyam – 1959
- Jumperum Veshtiyum −1947
- Mohini −1951
- Pichamoorthiyin Kathaikal – 1960
- Mangai Thalai – 1961
- Valithunai- 1964
- Kuyilin Shruthi – 1970
- Kakaikalum kilikalum – 1977
- Mana Nilal – 1977
- Pichamoorthiyin Kavithaikal −1985
- Kakkaikalum Kiliyum – 1977

== See also ==
- List of Indian writers
- List of Tamil-language writers
