= Mowni =

Mowni was the pen name of Tamil fiction writer S. Mani Iyer (1907–1985). Born at Semmangudi, Mowni, was one of the most significant writers of short stories in the first wave of the Tamil Renaissance. He received his high school education in Kumbakonam and lived there for fourteen years after marrying. Then he moved to Chidambaram permanently to look after his family properties. He initially had 5 children, 4 boys and a girl. Two of his sons died when they were very young. One other son passed on due to an accident. His remaining son lives in the USA. His daughter lives near Kumbakonam.

Mowni had a bachelor's degree in Mathematics, but he did not take up any job in the field. He was very fond of European classical music and he also had very strong exposure to Western literature, and showed deep interest in Indian philosophy. Mowni wrote 24 short stories from around 1934, some of which have been translated into English. Mowni's stories are based on the uncertainties of human life, relationships and their manifestations. His pen name and the titles of his stories were given to him by his mentor. His stories came out in Tamil magazines such as Theni. He was fondly called by pudhumaipithan ( contemporary writer of his age)as "sirukathaiyin thirumular." Mowni died in Chidambaram on June 6, 1985.

R. Parthasarathy, Associate Professor of English and Asian Studies at Skidmore College, in a journal article on Tamil Literature, writes that Mowni explored the psychological qualities of character and situation. In the words of Subramanyam, Mowni "put the Tamil language to uses to which it had never been exposed and, in the process, became difficult, though not obscure."
