= Pudhumaipithan =

Tamil writer (1906–1948)

- Born: C. Viruthachalam; 25 April 1906; Thirupathiripuliyur, South Arcot District, Madras Presidency, British India (now in Cuddalore District, Tamil Nadu, India)
- Died: 30 June 1948 (aged 42); Trivandrum, Kingdom of Travancore, Dominion of India (now Thiruvananthapuram, Kerala, India)
- Citizenship: Indian
- Education: B.A
- Alma mater: Hindu College, Tirunelveli
- Occupations: Author, scriptwriter
- Spouse: Kamala
- Children: Dinakari
- Writing career
- Language: Tamil
- Period: 1934–46
- Genres: Short story, horror, social satire
- Subjects: Social Satire, Politics
- Notable works: Kadavulum Kandasami Pillayum, Ponnagaram, Thunbakeni
- Movement: Manikodi

C. Viruthachalam (25 April 1906 – 30 June 1948), better known by the pseudonym Pudhumaipithan (also spelt as Pudumaipithan or Puthumaippiththan), was one of the most influential and revolutionary writers of Tamil fiction. His works were characterized by social satire, progressive thinking and outspoken criticism of accepted conventions. Contemporary writers and critics found it difficult to accept his views and his works were received with extreme hostility. He as an individual and his works have been extensively reviewed and debated for over sixty years since his death. His influence has been accepted and appreciated by the present day writers and critics of Tamil fiction. In 2002, the Government of Tamil Nadu nationalised the works of Pudumaippithan.

== Life and career ==
Pudhumaipithan was born in Thiruppadirippuliyur (Cuddalore district). His early education was obtained in places like Gingee, Kallakurichi and Tindivanam. He completed his Bachelor of Arts degree from Tirunelveli Hindu college in 1931. In the same year he married Kamala and moved to Madras.

His career as a writer began in 1933 with an essay "Gulabjaan Kaadhal" (Love for Gulab jamun) published in the magazine Gandhi. His first short story "Aatrangarai Pillaiyaar" (Pillaiyaar on the river bank) was published in 1934 in "Manikodi" and from then on his short stories appeared regularly in it. His short stories appeared in a number of magazines like Kalaimakal, Jothi, Sudantira Chanku, Oozhiyan and Thamizh Mani and the annual issue of Dina Mani. He worked briefly as a sub editor at Oozhiyan and later at Dina Mani. In 1943, he left Dina Mani to join Dinasari. In 1940, his book "Pudhumaipithan Kadhaigal"(The stories of Pudhumaipithan), an anthology of his short stories was published. He slowly ventured into the world of Tamil cinema and worked as a scriptwriter in the films Avvaiyaar and KaamaValli. In 1945, he started "Parvatha Kumari Productions" and made an abortive attempt at producing a film called "Vasanthavalli". While working for the movie "Raja Mukthi", in Pune he contracted tuberculosis. He died on 5 May 1948 in Thiruvananthapuram.

== Works and themes ==
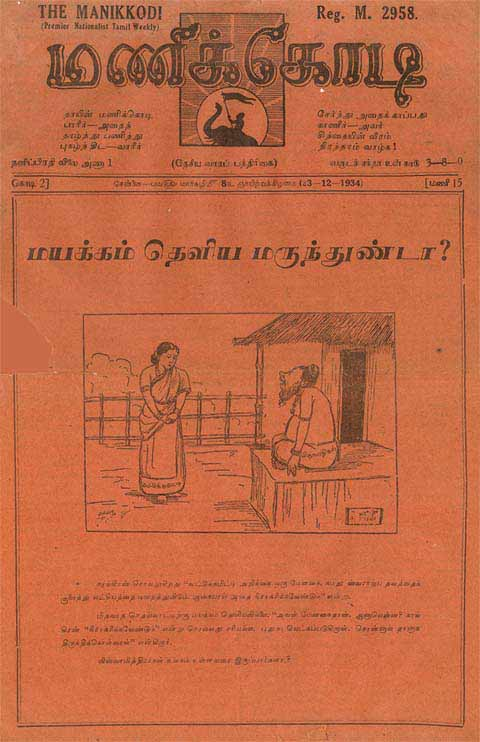
Manikodi magazine

Pudumaippithan's active writing period was less than 15 years (1934–46) in which he wrote nearly 100 short stories, an equal number of essays on a variety of subjects, 15 poems, a few plays and scores of book reviews. His writings gave him a reputation as a maverick. His works were influenced by the French short story writer Guy de Maupassant among others. The subjects he wrote on and the characters he chose to portray were completely new to Tamil fiction. He felt that Tamil literature had been crippled by unspoken conventions and openly criticized those who adhered to them. In one of his essays he expressed his displeasure as:

We have been having a notion that there are certain things that can be said and certain things that cannot be said in (Tamil) literature; and we have lived with that philosophy. But that is not the truth. For nearly two hundred years we have lived a life of parasites. We don't even dare to see issues straight on the face and that is why we have been providing excuses for ourselves. If literature can give birth to the malicious Ravana, blood sheds and sinful allegories, why can't it give a place to the poor prostitute? The society doesn't rust because of that. Moreover, there is no way to preserve an antique that has already rusted.

He was unfazed by the hostile reception that his works received from contemporary writers and critics alike. Dismissing his critics, he wrote :

Just like God is not bound by theologians, my creations are not bound by your conventional standards. I am not responsible for that and neither are my creations. I would like to point out it is YOUR standards you are using to judge my creations.

To voice his views he used a wide range of characters, both common – husbands wives, students, children, rickshaw pullers, villagers, beggars, whores, oppressed people, saints, revolutionaries; and uncommon – God, ghosts, monsters, hospital beds. Some of his favourite themes were – conflicts between emotion and reason, Hindu religion – its rules, rituals and laws, caste system, struggles for survival and oppression of women in the Indian society.

=== Short stories ===
Palvannam Pillai – Shortstory

Pudumaipithan is primarily known for his short stories. Of the 108 stories that have been identified as works of Pudumaipithan, only 48 had been published in book form during his lifetime. Most of his works were published in magazines like Manikodi, Kalaimagal, Jothi, Sudantira Chanku, Oozhiyan, Thamizh Mani, Dina mani, Dina Sari and Nandan. The rest have been published posthumously in various anthologies, the latest one being in 2000. He belonged to the Manikodi movement (named for the magazine) which flourished in 1930s. Ku. Paa Rajakoopaalan, B. S. Ramaiya and Va. Ramasamy were his contemporaries in the Manikodi movement.

=== Translations ===
He was also a prolific translator of literary works from other languages into Tamil. He translated around 50 short stories, including the works of Molière, Kay Boyle, Maxim Gorky, Sinclair Lewis, Ernst Toller, William Shakespeare, E. M. Delafield, William Saroyan, E. V. Lucas, Moshe Smilansky, Robert Louis Stevenson, Bret Harte, John Galsworthy, Aleksandr Kuprin, Anton Chekhov, Franz Kafka, Ilya Ehrenburg, Guy de Maupassant, Valery Bryusov, Anatole France, Leonid Andreyev, Henrik Ibsen, Nathaniel Hawthorne, Edgar Allan Poe, Robert Murray Gilchrist, Frances Bellerby, Bjørnstjerne Bjørnson, Leonard Strong, Jack London, Peter Egge, Mikhail Aleksandrovich Sholokhov, Thomas Wolfe and James Hanley. He had strong views on doing translations and adaptations. He equated adaptations to literary theft and held the view that translation was the proper way to bring literary works of other languages to Tamil. In 1937, he was involved in a literary feud with Kalki Krishnamurthy on the issue of translations vs adaptations

=== Poems ===
Pudumaipithan wrote about fifteen poems in total. His first published poem was Thiru Angila arasanga thondaradipodi azhwar vaibhavam, which appeared in 1934. Most of his poems were written as letters to his friend T. M. Chidambara Ragunathan in the form of Venpas. The fifteen poems were published posthumously in 1954. Like his short stories, his poems are full of wit and satire. The most famous of his poems is the abusive limerick Moonavarunasalamae written in review of a book on Tamil prose, which failed to mention the Manikodi movement.

=== Political books ===
Pudumaipithan's political orientation was socialist. Among his political essays and books, four are considered important – Fascist Jatamuni (a biography of Benito Mussolini), Gapchip Durbar (a biography of Adolf Hitler), Stalinukku Theriyum and Adhikaram yarukku (both endorsing communism and policies of Joseph Stalin). All the four books contain scathing indictments of fascism and a general agreement with Stalinist policies.

== Writing style ==
Ponnagaram – Shortstory

Pudhumaipithan was the first Tamil writer to successfully use a dialect of Tamil other than that of Chennai or Tanjore. Most of his characters spoke the Tirunelveli dialect. His stories were set either in Madras or in Tirunelveli, the two places where he spent considerable portions of his life. His writing style had a mixture of colloquial and classical words. Gentle satire even while handling complicated and serious situations was his hallmark. He used harsh language while arguing with his literary opponents like Kalki Krishnamoorthy and wrote insulting limericks in his book reviews.

== Plagiarism and other criticisms ==
Pudumaippithan has been accused by some of his contemporaries and later critics of having plagiarized from the works of Maupassant. Chief among the accusers were his contemporaries Pe. Ko. Sundararajan (Chitty) and So. Sivapathasundaram and literary critic Kaarai Krishnamoorthy. Pudumaipitthan himself published the short story "Tamil Paditha Pondaati" (The wife who knew Tamil) with the foreword that it was based on Maupassant's work. Pudumaipithan's biographer T.M. Chidambara Ragunathan has identified the stories samadhi, Nondi, Bayam, Kolaikaran kai, Nalla velaikaran and Andha muttal venu as adaptations of Maupassant's works and the story Pithukuli as the adaptation of a Robert Browning poem. A few more stories like Doctor Sampath, Naane Kondren, Yaar Kurravali and Thekkangandrugal have also been tentatively identified as possible adaptations. His defenders (including Ragunathan and historian A R Venkatachalapathy) have argued that those were adaptations and not plagiarizations. Pudumaipithan did not publish the short stories which have been identified (except Tamil Paditha Pondaati) as adaptations when he was alive. They were published posthumously only after 1953. Thus, the defenders infer he would have acknowledged them as adaptations if he had published them himself (as he did in the case of Tamil Paditha Pondaati). Further they contend Pudhumaipithan did not know French and during his lifetime the other Maupassant stories he has been accused of plagiarizing had not been translated into English. In their view, Pudumaipithan has had to suffer the accusation of plagiarism due to the callousness of his posthumous publishers. All of Pudhumaipithan's adaptations were written before 1937, when he became involved in a literary feud with Kalki Krishnamurthy about adapting works from other languages. During the feud he wrote biting essays equating adaptations with literary theft.

He has been criticized for just raising uncomfortable issues and not proposing any solutions for them. He had responded by pointing out that his job was only raising the issue and leaving the reader to figure out the solution. There have also been minor criticisms regarding his writing style like his digressing from the plot due to elaborate descriptions of environment and characters. Recently, Tamil critic A. Marx has criticised Pudumaipithan's portrayal of Dalits, Christians, Maravars and meat eaters as derogatory.

== Pseudonyms ==
Pudhumaipithan wrote under different pseudonyms, but the name "Pudhumaipithan" was the one that became famous. He himself preferred the name as he felt that this name was partially responsible for the appeal of his stories. Some of his other pseudonyms were So.Vi, Rasamattam, Mathru, Koothan, Nandhan, Oozhiyan, Kabhali, Sukraachari and Iraval visirimadippu. For publishing poems he used the pseudonym Velur Ve. Kandasamy Pillai. Due to the accusation of plagiarism his pseudonyms have been extensively researched. T.M. Chidambara Ragunathan in his pudhumaipithan biography Pudumaippithan kathaigal: sila vimarsanangalum vishamangalum, has advanced the theory that all the works published under the name of "Nandhan" are adaptive works rather than original ones.

== Bibliography ==
=== Poems ===
- Thiru Angila arasanga thondaradipodi azhwar vaibhavam
- Moona arunasalamae mooda
- Inaiyarra India
- Sellum vazhi iruttu

=== Political books ===
- Fascist Jatamuni
- Kapchip Darbar
- Stalinukku Theriyum
- Athikaram Yaarukku

=== Short stories ===
- Ahalyai
- Sellammal
- Gopalayyangarin Manaivi
- Idhu machine yugam
- Kadavulin Pradhinidhi
- Kadavulum kandasami pillayaum
- Padapadappu
- Oru naal kalindadhu
- Theruvilakku
- Kalanum Kizhaviyum
- Ponnagaram
- Irandu ulagangal
- Aanmai
- Athangarai Pillayar
- Abinav snap
- Andru iravu
- Andha muttal venu
- Avadharam
- Brammarakshas
- Bayam
- Doctor Sampath
- Eppodum mudivilae inbam
- Gnanagugai
- Gopalapuram
- Ilakkiya mamma nayanar puranam
- Indha paavi
- Kaali kovil
- Kapatakuram
- Kalyani
- Kanavu penn
- Kaanchanai
- Kannan kuzhal
- Karuchidaivu
- Kattilai vittu iranga kadhai
- Kattil pesugiradhu
- Kavandanum Kamamum
- Kayirravu
- Kodukkapuli maram
- Kolaikaran kai
- Konra sirippu
- Kuppanin kanavu
- Kurravaki yaar
- Maayavalai
- Magamasaanam
- Manakugai oviyangal
- Mana nizhal
- Motcham
- Naane kondren
- Nalla velaikaran
- Nambikkai
- Nanmai bayakkumenin
- Naasakara kumgal
- Nigumbalai
- Ninaivu padhai
- Nirvigarpa samadhi
- Nisamum ninaippum
- Nyayam
- Nyayamthan
- Nondi
- Oppandam
- Oru kolai anubavam
- Paal vannam pillai
- Parimudhal
- Paattiyin deepavali
- Pithukuli
- Poikaal kudhirai
- Poosanikkai ambi
- Puratchi manappanmai
- Pudhiya koondu
- Pudhiya kandapuranam
- Pudhiya nandhan
- Pudhiya oli
- Ramanathanin kaditham
- Saba vimosanam
- Salaram
- Samaavin thavaru
- Sayangala mayakkam
- Samaadhi
- Samiyarum kuzhandhaiyum seedaiyum
- Sanappan kozhi
- Sangu tharmam
- Selvam
- Sevvai dhosham
- Sirpiyin naragam
- Sithan pokku
- Sithi
- Sivasidambara sevugam
- Sonna sol
- Subbaya pillayin kadhalgal
- Thani oruvanukku
- Thega kandrugal
- Thirandha jannal
- Thirukkural kumaresa pillai
- Thirukkural seidha thirukoothu
- Thyaga moorthi
- Thunba keni
- Unarchiyin adimaigal
- Ubadesam
- Vaada malli
- Vaazhkai
- Vazhi
- Velipoochu
- Vedhalam sonna kadhai
- Vibareedha aasai
- Vinayaga Chathurthi

=== Translations ===
- Ashatapoorthi
- Aattukuttithani
- Amma
- Andha paiyan
- Ashtamasithi
- Asisriyar Araichi
- Adhikaalai
- Bali
- Sithravadhai
- Daimon kanda unmai
- Ini
- Indha pal vivakaram
- Ishtasithi
- Kadhal kadhai
- Kanavu
- Kalappumanam
- Karaiyil kanda mugam
- Kizhavi
- Latheefa
- Magalukku manam seidhu vaithargal
- Manimandhira theevu
- Maniosai
- Markheem
- Milees
- Mudhalum mudivum
- Nadakakaari
- Natchathira ilavarasi
- Om santhi santhi
- Kattukathai
- Oruvanum oruthiyum
- Paithiyakaari
- Palingusilai
- Balthazar
- Poi
- Poochandiyin magal
- Rajya ubadhai
- Roger melvinin eemachadangu
- Saaraya peepai
- Sagothararkal
- Samathuvam
- Scheherazade kadhai solli
- Siritha mugakaaran
- Sooniyakaari
- Suvaril vazhi
- Thayilla kuzhandaikal
- Thayal machine
- Thanthai mugarkarrum udavi
- Deivam kudutha varam
- Desiya geetham
- Deivathukku marru
- Thuravi
- Uyir Aasai
- Veedu thirumbal
- Aei padagukaara
- Yaathirai
- Emanai emaarra
- Yutha devadhaiyin thirumuga mandalam

== See also ==
- List of Indian writers
