= Gowri Kirubanandan =

Translator (b. 1956)

- Born: Dindigul, India

Gowri Kirubanandan is a Tamil writer known for her Telugu - Tamil translation works. She won Sahitya Akademi Translation Prize in 2015 for her translation of Telugu novel Vimuktha, by Volka into Tamil, titled Meetchi.

== Early life ==
Kirubanandan was born in Dindigul, Tamil Nadu to Krishnamoorthy and Rajalakshmi. She was raised and graduated in Andhra Pradesh. After her marriage, she came back to Tamil Nadu in 1976.

== Works ==
So far she has translated 70 Telugu novels and 50 Telugu short stories into Tamil, including Yandamuri Veerendranath's novel Antharmukam. She also translated works of well known writers like Jayakanthan, Ashokamitran, Thoppil Mohamed Meeran, Nanjil Nadan and Neela Padmanabhan from Tamil to Telugu. She translated Prapanchan’s Vaanam Vasappadum and Ku. Alagirisami’s Anbalippu from Tamil to Telugu.

== Awards ==
- 2015 Sahitya Akademi Translation Prize
- 2016 Sparrow Literary Awards
