= Thi. Ka. Sivasankaran =

Indian writer and critic

- Born: Tirunelveli Ganapathy Sivasankaran; 30 March 1925; Tinnevelly, Madras Province, British India (now Tirunelveli, Tamil Nadu,
- Died: 25 March 2014 (aged 88); Tinnevelly, Madras Province, British India (now Tirunelveli, Tamil Nadu,
- Occupations: Writer, Translator
- Relatives: Vannadasan (Son)
- Awards: Sahitya Akademi Award (2000)

Thi. Ka. Sivasankaran or T. G. Sivasankaran (30 March 1925 – 25 March 2014), was a Tamil writer and critic from Tamil Nadu, India. He is popularly known by his Tamil initials as Thi. Ka. Si.

Sivasankaran was born in Tirunelveli. His works were first published in the literary journal Grama oozhiyan in 1947. He was a Marxist by political orientation and a member of the Communist Party of India (CPI). He was influential in the party's literary journal Thamarai. He was a friend and contemporary of socialist writers like Vallikannan and T. M. Chidambara Ragunathan. During his years in Thamarai, he was instrumental in discovering and encouraging new writers like Prapanchan, D. Selvaraj, Poomani, Vannadhasan, Tamil Nadan and Jayanthan. In 2000, he was awarded the Sahitya Akademi Award for Tamil for his literary criticism Vimarsanangal Mathippuraikal Pettikal (lit. Criticisms, Reviews and Interviews). In 2008, a documentary film on him was released by the Chennai Tamil Koodam. In 2010, the formation of a charitable trust in his name at the Thanjavur Tamil University was announced. He is the father of Tamil writer Vannadhasan.

== Awards and recognitions ==
- Sahitya Akademi Award (2000)
- Government of Tamil Nadu literary award (2002)
- Bharathi Ilakkiya award
- Lilly Deivasigamani Literary Trust award
- Tamil Sanror peravai award

== Bibliography ==
=== Memoir ===
- Ninaiodaik Kuripugal (நினைவோடைக் குறிப்புகள்)
- Thi.Ka.Si.yin Naatkurippugal (தி.க.சி.யின் நாட்குறிப்புகள்)

=== Interviews ===
- Vimarsanangal Mathippuraikal Pettikal (விமர்சனங்கள் மதிப்புரைகள் பேட்டிகள்)

=== Essay ===
- Thi. Ka. Si. Thiranaaivu Kalanjiyam(தி.க.சி. திறனாய்வுக் களஞ்சியம்)

=== Translation ===
- Ethu NagarigamMaxim Gorky (எது நாகரிகம்?)
- Thi.Ka.Si Mozhipeyarpugal (தி. க. சி. மொழிபெயர்ப்புகள்)

== See also ==
- List of Sahitya Akademi Award winners for Tamil
- List of Indian writers
- List of Tamil-language writers
