= Sa. Kandasamy =

Indian writer (1940–2020)

Sa.Kandasamy
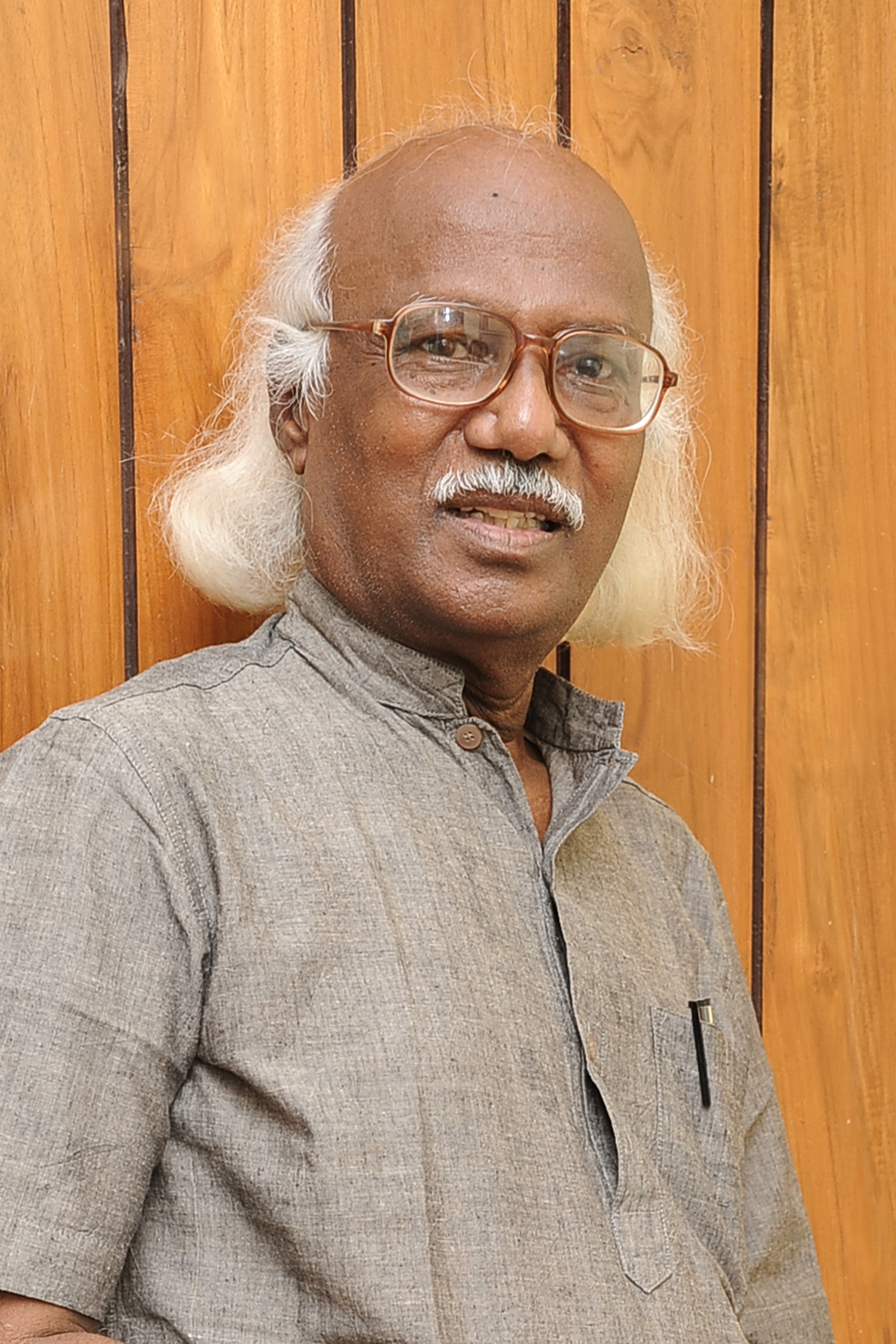
- Born: Sa.Kandasamy; 23 July 1940 (age 86)
- Writing career
- Language: Tamil
- Genres: Short Story, Novel, Novella, Translation
- Notable awards: Sahitya Akademi Award (1998)

Sa. Kandasamy (23 July 1940 – 31 July 2020) was a Sahitya Akademi Award winning Tamil writer and documentary film-maker from Tamil Nadu.

== Personal Life ==
Kandasamy was born on 23 July 1940 in Mayiladuthurai, in the Indian state of Tamil Nadu.. he did his Schooling in Koorainadu, Mayiladuthurai.After studying at the Singaram Pillai School in Villivakkam, he worked at the Chennai Port Trust and the Food Corporation of India. Kandasamy later moved to Chennai, and joined a writers' Association writer Cre-A-Ramakrishnan, N.Krishnamoorthy, Ramu and artist K. M. Adimoolam. They briefly published a literary little magazine, Ka Sa Da Tha Pa Ra.

== Death ==
Sa. Kandasamy died on 31 July 2020 at the age of 80 when he underwent treatment in Private Hospital in Chennai.

== Literary career ==
Kandasamy's first novel was Chaayavanam, published in 1968 by Ms Lakshmi Krishna Murthy at Vasagar Vattam Publication. It was well-received and was later included by the National Book Trust as one of Indian literature's modern masterpieces.Chaayavanam is one of the earliest examples of literature focusing on ecological concerns in India, and focuses on forest clearances and industrial development in Tamil Nadu. Kandasamy based on the novel on his own experiences in rural Tamil Nadu, and named the novel after a village that he had lived in with his family, as a child.

His novel, Vicharanai Commission, which dealt with custodial violence and the police, won the Sahitya Akademi Award for Tamil in 1998.

He has published seven novels and several collection of short stories, in Tamil. One of Kandasamy's novels, Tholaindhu ponavargal was adapted for Doordarshan Kendra Chennai.

In addition to fiction, Kandasamy wrote several pieces of criticism, focusing on visual arts and writing in Tamil Nadu, as well as introducing a series of Tamil biographies published by the Sahitya Akademi.One of his short stories "Paaichal" is the Supplementary lesson of Unit 5 in Tamilnadu Samacheer Kalvi Class 10 portion (New 7 units edition).

== Film Making ==
Kandasamy's documentary film, Kaval Deivangal, documented history and techniques relating to traditional terracotta art in South India. It won the first prize at the Angino Film Festival, in Cyprus, in 1989. In addition, Kandasamy also directed several other documentaries, primarily on popular Tamil writers and artists, including the Sculptor S.Dhanapal, and writers Jayakanthan and Ashokamitran.

== Publications ==
=== Novels ===
- Saayavanam(சாயாவனம்) - 1969
- Avan Aanathu(அவன் ஆனது) - 1981
- Tholaindhu Ponavargal(தொலைந்து போனவர்கள்) - 1984
- Surya vamsam(சூரிய வம்சம்) - 1984
- Erikkaraiyil(ஏரிக்கரையில்) - 1986
- Velaiyatravan(வேலையற்றவன்) - 1987
- Ettavadhu Kadal(எட்டாவது கடல்) - 1994
- Visaranai Commission(விசாரணை கமிஷன்) - 1994
- Karuppin Kural(கருப்பின் குரல்) - 1996
- Maayaalokan(மாயாலோகன்) - 2011
- Vancouver(வான்கூவர்) - 2011
- Neelavan(நீலவன்) - 2011
- Perum Mazhai Natkal(பெரும் மழை நாட்கள்) - 2012

=== Short Story ===
- Tamizhil Rayil Kathaigal(தமிழில் இரயில் கதைகள்) - 2018

== Awards and honors ==
- (1995) Lalit Kala Akademi Fellowship - for contributions to literature
- (1998) Sahitya Akademi Award - for his novel, Vicharanai Commission
- (2004) Receives Senior Fellowship from Ministry of Culture, Government of India
- (2009) Kalaimamani Award — by the Government of Tamil Nadu.

== See also ==
- List of Sahitya Akademi Award winners for Tamil
- List of Indian writers
- List of Tamil-language writers
