= International Tamil Journalism Library, Trichy =

Library in Tamil Nadu, India

International Tamil Journalism Library, a private library, is located at Trichy in Tamil Nadu, India.

== Origin ==
After retirement from Public Works Department, Pattabiraman started the library when he was 12 and is still run by him. In initial stages it had only books. Later it became a unique library having Tamil journals. For more than six decades he is collecting books and journals. The library is functioning in the third floor of his house at Subramaniapuram in Trichy and is maintaining it properly. He started collecting the papers and journals since he was studying Standard IX in Aranthangi at Pudukkottai district. The habit became a passion when he joined the PWD after completing his diploma in Annamalai University. The exhibition he conducted, was widely visited by many students and teachers. At that time when he to Pollachi Mahalingam, a philanthropist, seeking help, which in turn he got a money order of Rs.200 from him. As he was known in the neighbourhood for reading out school lessons aloud, when Periyar E. V. Ramasamy came to Aranthangi for a meeting in 1960s, his neighbours made him to read out an article from a newspaper in front of Periyar, who greatly appreciated it. Later he told him about his newspaper collection, he handed him a copy he had in his hand. Among others he collected newspapers and journals from well-known personalities such as Kundrakudi Adigalar, Thirukkural Munusamy, K Appaduraiyar, Deepam Parthasarathy, Jayakanthan and Kumari Ananthan. After he came to know that Bharathiyar’s close associate Parali Su Nellaiyappar had a collection brought out by Congress leaders during the freedom struggle, he went to his house in Chennai, and stayed with Nellaiyappar for a whole night speaking about the freedom struggle and my collections and had the privilege of getting a copy of Logobagaari, which was edited by him during pre-Independence.

== Collections ==
The library has in its collections, 'Nellai Atthiyacchathana Narppothakam' published 160 years back, 'Gnanathuthan' published 110 years back, 'India' of Bharathiyar, 'Desabaktan' of Thiru Vi.Ka., 'Kudiarasu', 'Pakuttharivu', 'Lo Kopakari', 'Anantha Bothini' and other journals. Journals of Sri Lanka, Malaysia, Singapore and Canada are also found here. Books of poems, literature, environment, Tamil journalism, biography of leaders, computer studies, general knowledge, self improvement, student improvement, tour guide and other topics are available in this library. Books on Christianity, Jainism, Islam and books written by foreign authors are also found here. Souvenirs of World Tamil Conference have a place here. There are more than 3,400 books. Souvenirs published by various societies and English books, 120 Tamil journals and more than 900 rare books are here. The present journals, dailies and foreign journals totalling to 3,000, journals that are extinct totalling to 2,000, and more than 4,000 journals have a place in this library. Journals having just one issue and the present journals totalling to 50,000 are found here. Copies of 'Kumari', once edited by senior Congress leader Kumari Anandan, 'Tamil Nadu', brought out by Karumuthu Thiyagarajan Chettiar, and 'Jayakodi' and 'Jayaperigai' edited by Jayakanthan are found. This library has at least one copy of 7,000 different Tamil newspapers and journals. His collections include 'Bramma Vidhya' (1887), 'Kala Nilayam' (1929), 'Vivega Bothini' (1915), 'Vedanta Deepigai' (1926), 'Manoranjani' (1926), 'Ananda Bodhini' (1939) and 'Logobagaari' (1934). He also has 100 copies of newspapers which was brought out by several DMK leaders.

== Members ==
For the past five years 3,000 books and 2,000 newspapers have been accessioned. So far, 3,000 persons used the library. The library is having more than 125 members. Mo subscription is received from the members of the library. Students from colleges and schools and researchers are coming to this library for reference and reading purpose.

== Exhibitions ==
Encouraged his professors, while studying in Annamalai University, he conducted a book exhibition at the university’s library hall, in 1964. Later in many places he conducted exhibitions. He went to Sri Lanka, Singapore, Kualalumpur and Penang for this purpose. In addition to this he compiled five books.
