= Mi. Pa. Somasundaram =

Mi. Pa. Somu
- Born: Meenakshipuram Somasundaram; 17 June 1921; Meenakshipuram, Tirunelveli, Tamil Nadu
- Died: 15 January 1999 (aged 77) chennai
- Occupations: journalist, poet, writer
- Spouse: Pachai Ammal
- Children: Rajanandini
- Awards: Sahitya Akademi Award (1962)

Mi. Pa. Somu is the pen name of Mi. Pa. Somasundaram (Tamil: மீ. ப. சோமசுந்தரம், 17 June 1921 – 15 January 1999) a Tamil journalist, poet, writer and musicologist from Tamil Nadu, India.

== Biography ==
Somu was born in Meenakshipuram in Tirunelveli District. He studied Oriental Studies in Madras University and obtained the Vidwan certification awarded by it. He was a friend and contemporary of Pudhumaipithan. He won a short story competition conducted by the magazine Ananda Vikatan in 1938. He published his first collection of poems - Ilavenil - in 1946. It won a state award. He worked as the editor of the Tamil magazine Kalki from 1954 to 1956. He was the founder-editor of the monthly magazine Nanban from 1958 to 1960. He worked in All India Radio for over forty years and retired in 1981.

In 1962, he was awarded the Sahitya Akademi Award for Tamil for his travelogue Akkarai Cheemayil Arumadhangal. He has written a large number of poems, short stories, novels, non fiction essays, travelogues, plays and research articles on Music. He also contributed several entries to the Tamil Encyclopedia (Kalaikalanjiyam). He died in 1999.

== Bibliography ==
=== Poetry ===
- Ilavenil
- Manaparavani
- Kudikattu Vezha Mugan Venba Malai

=== Short stories ===
- Kelatha Ganam
- Udhaya Kumaari
- Manjal Roja
- Manai Mangalam
- Kallarai Mogini
- Thirupugazh Samiyar

=== Novels ===
- Ravichandrika
- Kadal Kanda Kanavu
- Nandavanam
- Vennilavu Pennarasi
- Enthayum Thayum

=== Essays ===
- Karthikeyani
- Aindharuvi
- Pillayar Saatchi

== See also ==
- List of Sahitya Akademi Award winners for Tamil
- List of Indian writers
- List of Tamil-language writers
