= Sirpi Balasubramaniam =

Tamil poet, critic, scholar and professor

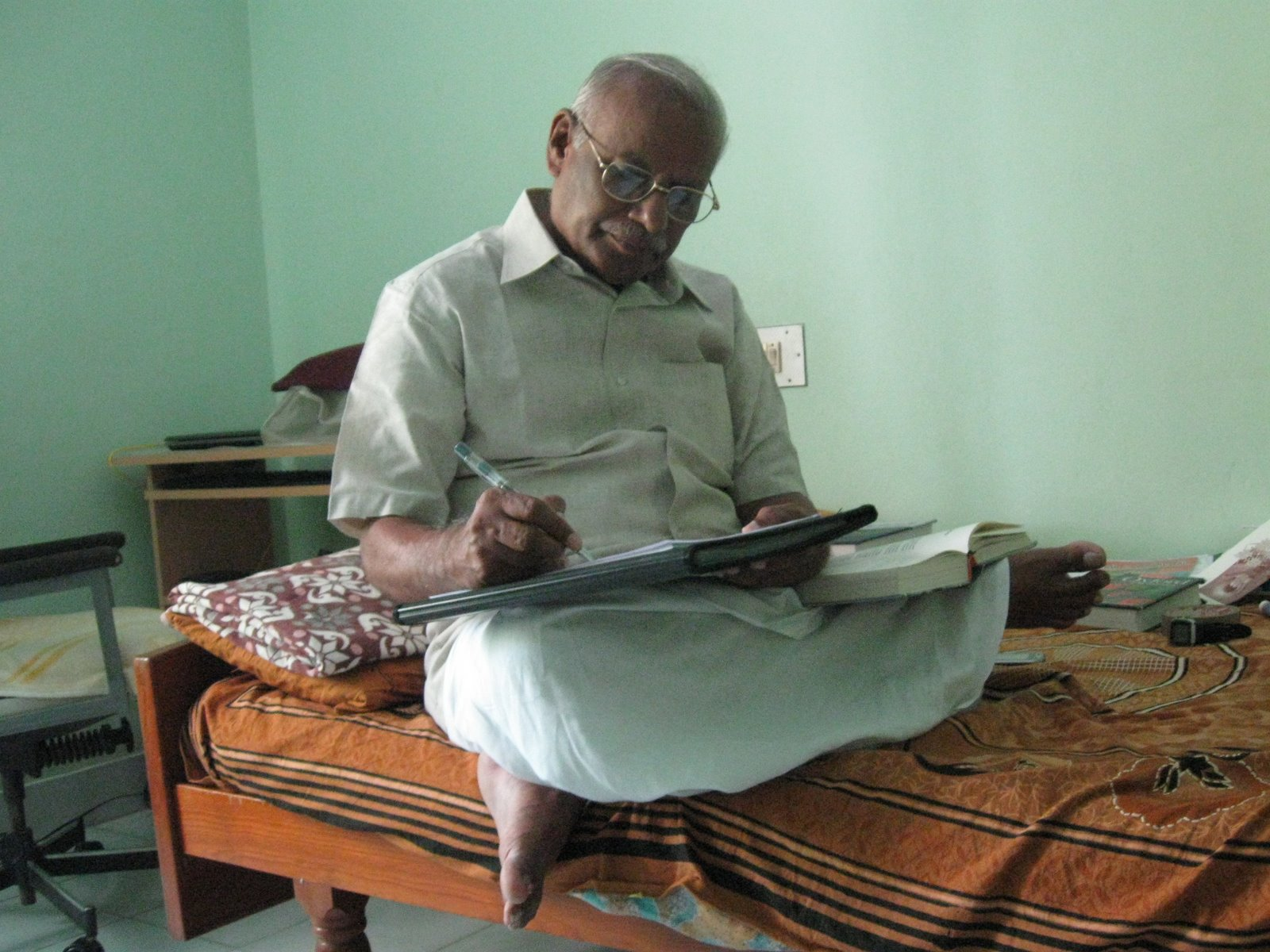
- Born: 29 July 1936 (age 90); Athupollachi,Madras Province,British India (now Coimbatore district,Tamil Nadu, India)
- Occupations: HOD & Professor at Bharathiar University.
- Writing career
- Pen name: Sirpi
- Language: Tamil
- Genres: Poet, Literary criticism
- Notable awards: Sahitya Akademi Award (2002), Padma Shri(2012).

Sirpi Balasubramaniam (born 29 July 1936) is a Tamil poet, critic, scholar and professor from Tamil Nadu, India.

== Biography ==
Balasubramaniam was born in Aaththupollachi village in Pollachi Coimbatore District. He obtained his MA from Annamalai University and PhD from Madras University. He worked as a lecturer in NGM college, Pollachi. He then became a Professor at the Tamil department of Bharathiar University. He eventually became the head of the Department. He was a founding member of the Vanambadi literary movement in the 1970s. He edited the movement's flagship journal of the same name and also another literary magazine called Annam vidu thoothu. He has published more than a dozen works of poetry and literary criticism in his literary career. In 2003, he was awarded the Sahitya Akademi Award for Tamil for his poetry collection Oru Giraamattu Nadhi (lit. River in a Hamlet ). He had earlier won the Sahitya Akademi Translation Prize in 2001 for his translation of Lalithambika Antharjanam's Agnisakshi into Tamil. He is the current convener of the Akademi's Tamil advisory board.

The English translation of his poem collection Poojiyangalin Sangili is published by Jayanthasri Balakrishnan as The Chain of Absolutes.

== Awards and recognitions ==
- Bharathidasan award - 1987
- Kalaimamani Award - 2007
- Tamil University award
- Sahitya Akademi Award for translation - 2001
- Sahitya Akademi Award for Tamil - 2003
- Rajah Sir Muthiah Chettiar Birthday Commemoration Award - 2006
- Lifetime Literature Achievement Award - (Puthiyathalaimurai Tamilan Awards 2018)
- Padmashri Award (Government of India)(2022)

== Partial bibliography ==
=== Poetry ===
- ilanthamizhae(1963)
- Nilakokru (1963)
- Siritha muthukkal (1968)
- Sarapa Yagam (1976)
- Mounamayakkangal (1982)
- Sooriya nizhal (1990)
- Irahu (1996)
- Margazhip paavai (2010)
- Poojayangalin Sangili
- Bharathi Kaithi En 203

=== Literary criticism ===
- Ilakkiya chinthanai (1989)
- A Comparative study of Bharathi and Vallathol
- Sirpiyin katturaikal (1996)
- Ramalinga vallalirin arutpa thirattu (2001)

== See also ==
- List of Sahitya Akademi Award winners for Tamil
- List of Indian writers
- List of Tamil-language writers
