= List of Sahitya Akademi Award winners for Tamil =

List of winners of a literary honor in India

Sahitya Akademi Award for Tamil
- Award for contributions to Tamil literature
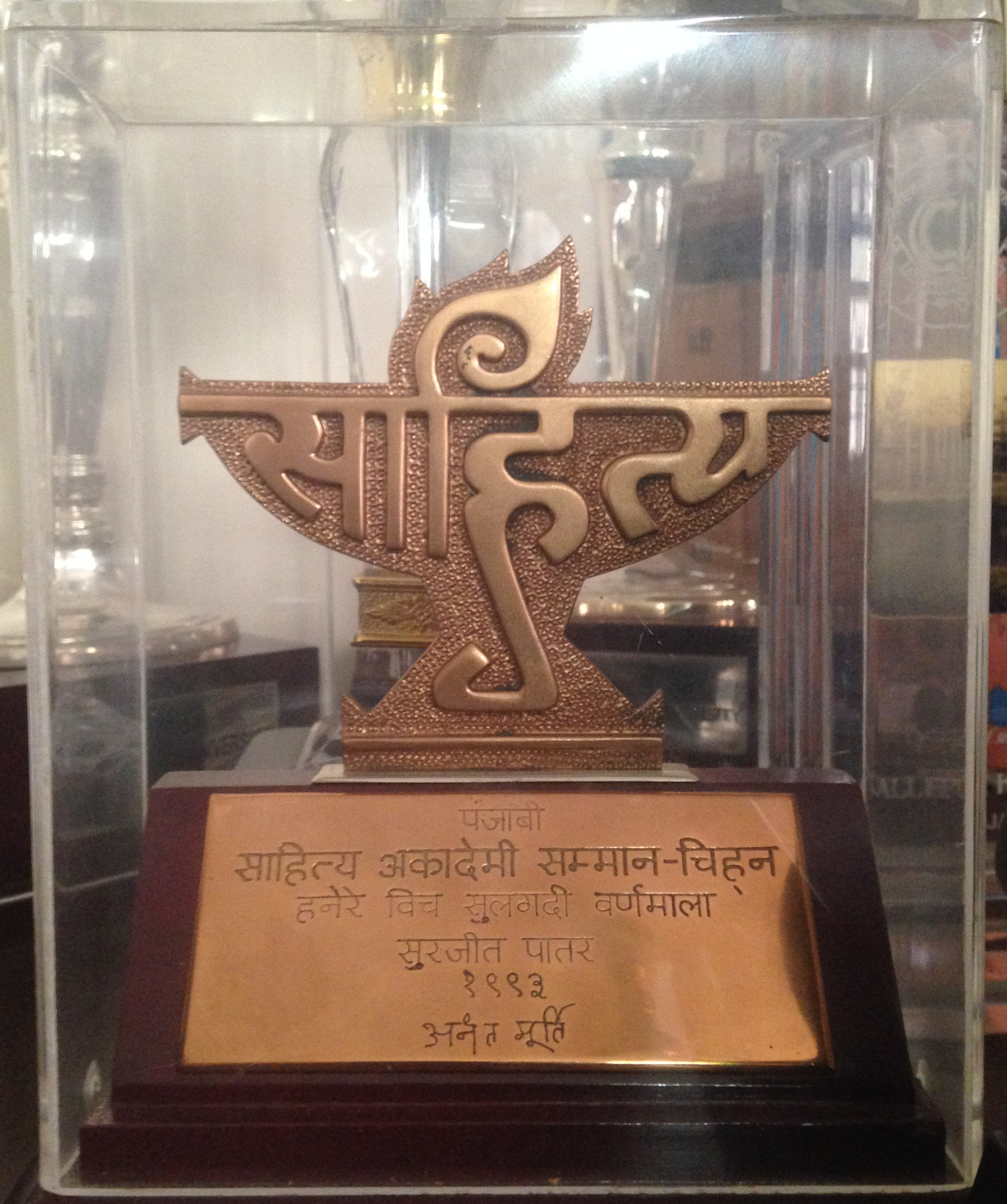
- Awarded for: Literary award in India
- Sponsored by: Sahitya Akademi, Government of India
- Reward: ₹1 lakh (US$1,100)
- First award: 1955
- Final award: 2025

Highlights
- Total awarded: 66
- First winner: R. P. Sethu Pillai
- Most Recent winner: S. Tamilselvan
- Website: Official website

Part of a series on

Sahitya Akademi Awards
Category
Sahitya Akademi Award winners by language
- Assamese
- Bengali
- Bodo
- Dogri
- English
- Gujarati
- Hindi
- Kannada
- Kashmiri
- Konkani
- Maithili
- Malayalam
- Marathi
- Meitei (Manipuri)
- Nepali
- Odia
- Punjabi
- Rajasthani
- Sanskrit
- Santali
- Sindhi
- Tamil
- Telugu
- Urdu
Sahitya Akademi Translation Prizes
- Assamese
- Bengali
- Bodo
- Dogri
- English
- Gujarati
- Hindi
- Kannada
- Kashmiri
- Konkani
- Maithili
- Malayalam
- Marathi
- Meitei (Manipuri)
- Nepali
- Odia
- Punjabi
- Rajasthani
- Sanskrit
- Santali
- Sindhi
- Tamil
- Telugu
- Urdu
Sahitya Akademi Yuva Puraskar
- Assamese
- Bengali
- Bodo
- Dogri
- English
- Gujarati
- Hindi
- Kannada
- Kashmiri
- Konkani
- Maithili
- Malayalam
- Meitei (Manipuri)
- Marathi
- Nepali
- Odia
- Punjabi
- Rajasthani
- Sanskrit
- Santali
- Sindhi
- Tamil
- Telugu
- Urdu
Sahitya Akademi Bal Sahitya Puraskar
- Assamese
- Bengali
- Bodo
- Dogri
- English
- Gujarati
- Hindi
- Kannada
- Kashmiri
- Konkani
- Maithili
- Malayalam
- Meitei (Manipuri)
- Marathi
- Nepali
- Odia
- Punjabi
- Rajasthani
- Sanskrit
- Santali
- Sindhi
- Tamil
- Telugu
- Urdu
Related
- Eighth Schedule to the Constitution of India
- Official Languages Commission
- List of languages by number of native speakers in India

The Sahitya Akademi Award is the second-highest literary honor in India. The Sahitya Akademi, India's National Academy of Letters, aims at "promoting Indian literature throughout the world". The Akademi annually confers the award on writers of "the most outstanding books of literary merit". The awards are given for works published in any of the 24 languages recognised by the akademi. Instituted in 1954, the award recognizes and promotes excellence in writing and acknowledge new trends. The annual process of selecting awardees runs for the preceding twelve months. As of 2015, the award comprises a plaque and a cash prize of ₹1 lakh (US$1,100).

The inaugural edition of the award recognised works in twelve languages – Assamese, Bengali, Gujarati, Hindi, Kannada, Malayalam, Marathi, Odia, Punjabi, Tamil, Telugu and Urdu. In Tamil, the first recipient of the award was R. P. Sethu Pillai, who was honored for his collection of essays entitled Tamil Inbam in 1955. Posthumous recipients of the award include Kalki Krishnamurthy (1956), Bharathidasan (1969), Ku. Alagirisami (1970), Aadhavan Sundaram (1987), C. S. Chellappa (2001), Melanmai Ponnusamy (2008). As of 2026, the award has been presented to 67 writers.

== Rules and criteria for submissions ==
Although the Akademi is under the control of the Ministry of Culture, Government of India, it functions as an autonomous body. To be eligible for the award, the work must be an "outstanding contribution to the language and literature to which it belongs". It can be a "creative" or a "critical" work; translations, anthologies, abridgments, compilations, annotation, and research papers are ineligible. To contest in a particular year, the work must have been published during the last five years, prior to the preceding year. (Note: To compete in 2016, the work must have been published between 2009 and 2014.) In case of tiebreakers, the literary contribution and "standing" of the authors would be taken into consideration. Only Indian nationals are eligible for the award. The award will be not be given if there are no more than two contestants in the final round. The works of authors who have been awarded earlier by the Akademi – translation prize, Bal Sahitya Puraskar and Yuva Puraskar are exceptions though – are ineligible. Further, the author must not be a recipient of the Bhasha Samman or the Sahitya Akademi Fellowship. The works of members of the executive board of the Akademi are ineligible for the award. Incomplete works may be considered for the award only if a part of the work, under which it competes, is deemed "complete". A posthumous publication is eligible only if the author has been deceased for over five years starting from the current year. The Akademi does not consider direct submissions from authors or publishers.

== Selection process ==
The Akademi will prepare a "ground list", shortlisted from a set of eligible books in each of the recognized languages. Each language will have an "Advisory Board" member, who will shortlist and form and send a panel consisting of not more than five members to the President of the Akademi.

The preliminary panel consists of ten referees, who are nominated by the President upon requests received from the members of the "Advisory Board". The recommendations received from members of the "Advisory Board" of each languages will be compiled and sent to the corresponding referees, who in turn will select two entries. A committee of three members, selected by the President, out of a panel of seven names recommended by the Language "Advisory Board", chooses the awardee in each language. The jury members are selected by the President after considering the recommendations in this behalf by the members of the Language Advisory Board concerned. The Akademi purchases the books recommended by the referees in the preliminary round and sends them to the jury members and the Convener. The jury members arrive at the winners, based on consensus or by majority. The jury also has the right to declare that no book is eligible for the award during a particular year.

== List of recipients ==
Key
†	Denotes posthumous recipients

List of recipients, year, and work
Year	portrait	Recipient	Work	Category
1955		R. P. Sethu Pillai	Tamil Inbam	collection of essays
1956		Kalki Krishnamurthy †	Alai Osai	Novel
1957	No award			
1958		C. Rajagopalachari	Chakravarti Tirumagan	Retelling of the Ramayana
1959	No award			
1960	No award			
1961		Mu. Varadarajan	Agal Vilakku	Novel
1962	—	Mi. Pa. Somasundaram	Akkarai Cheemaiyil Aarumathangal	Travelogue
1963		Akilan	Vengaiyin Maindhan	Historic novel
1964	No award			
1965		P. Sri Acharya	Sri Ramanujar	Biography
1966		Ma. Po. Si.	Vallalar Kanda Orumaippaadu	Biography
1967		K. V. Jagannathan	Virar Ulagam	Literary criticism
1968		A. Srinivasa Raghavan	Vellai Paravai	poetry
1969		Bharathidasan †	Pisirantaiyar	Play
1970		Ku. Alagirisami †	Anbalippu	Short stories
1971		Na. Parthasarathy	Samudaya Veedhi	Novel
1972		D. Jayakanthan	Sila Nerangalil Sila Manithargal	Novel
1973	—	Rajam Krishnan	Verukku Neer	Novel
1974	—	K. D. Thirunavukkarasu	Thirukkural Needhi Illakkiyam	Literary criticism
1975	—	R. Dhandayudham	Tharkkala Tamizh Illakkiyam	Literary criticism
1976	No award			
1977	—	Indira Parthasarathy	Kuruthip Punal	Novel
1978	—	Vallikannan	Pudukavithaiyin Thottramum Valarchiyum	Criticism
1979	—	Thi. Janakiraman	Sakthi Vaithiyam	Short stories
1980		Kannadasan	Cheraman Kadali	Novel
1981	—	M. Ramalingam	Puthiya Urai Nadai	Criticism
1982	—	B. S. Ramaiya	Manikkodikalam	Literary history
1983	—	T. M. Chidambara Ragunathan	Bharathi: Kalamum Karuthum	Literary criticism
1984	—	Lakshmi	Oru Kaveriyai Pola	Novel
1985	—	A. S. Gnanasambandan	Kamban: Putiya Parvai	Literary criticism
1986	—	Ka. Naa. Subramaniam	Ilakkiyathukku oru Iyakkam	Literary criticism
1987	—	Aadhavan Sundaram †	Mudalil Iravu Varum	Short stories
1988		V. C. Kulandaiswamy	Vaazhum Valluvam	Literary criticism
1989	—	La Sa Ra	Chintanadi	Autobiographical Essays
1990	—	Su. Samuthiram	Veril Pazhutha Pala	Novel
1991		Ki. Rajanarayanan	Gopallapurathu Makkal	Novel
1992		Kovi. Manisekaran	Kutralakurinji	Historic Novel
1993		M. V. Venkatram	Kathukal	Novel
1994		Ponneelan	Pudhiya Dharsanangal	Novel
1995		Prapanchan	Vanam Vasappadum	Novel
1996		Ashoka Mitran	Appavin Snehidar	Short stories
1997	—	Thoppil Mohamed Meeran	Chaivu Narkali	Novel
1998		Sa. Kandasamy	Visaranai Commission	Novel
1999	—	S. Abdul Rahman	Aalapanai	Poetry
2000		Thi. Ka. Sivasankaran	Vimarsanangal Mathippuraikal Pettikal	Literary criticism
2001	—	C. S. Chellappa †	Sutanthira Daagam	Novel
2002		Sirpi Balasubramaniam	Oru Giraamattu Nadi	Poetry
2003		Vairamuthu	Kallikattu Ithikasam	Novel
2004	—	Tamilanban	Vanakkam Valluva	Poetry
2005	—	G. Thilakavathi	Kalmaram	Novel
2006	—	Mu. Metha	Akayathukku Aduthaveedu	Poetry
2007		Neela Padmanabhan	Ilai Uthir Kaalam	Novel
2008		Melanmai Ponnusamy	Minsarapoo	Short story
2009	—	Puviarasu	Kaioppam	Poetry
2010		Nanjil Nadan	Soodiya Poo Soodarka	Short stories
2011		Su. Venkatesan	Kaval Kottam	Novel
2012		Daniel Selvaraj	Thol	Novel
2013		Joe D Cruz	korkai	Novel
2014	—	Poomani	Agngnaadi	Novel
2015	—	A. Madhavan	Ilakkiya suvadugal	Essays
2016		Vannadasan	Oru Siru Isai	Short stories
2017	—	Inquilab	Kaandhal Naatkal	Poetry
2018		S.Ramakrishnan	Sanjaaram	Novel
2019		Cho.Dharman	Sool	Novel
2020		Imaiyam	Sellaatha Panam	Novel
2021		C. S. Lakshmi (Ambai)	Sivappu Kazhuthudan Oru Pachai Paravai	Short Stories
2022		Dr. M. Rajendran IAS	Kaala Paani	Novel
2023	—	Rajasekaran (Devibharathi)	Neervazhi Paduvum	Novel
2024	—	A. R. Venkatachalapathy	Tirunelveeli Ezucciyum Vaa. Vuu.ci. Yum 1908	Research
2025		S. Tamilselvan	Tamizh Sirukathaiyin Thadankal	Literary Criticism
