= Ku. Alagirisami =

Tamil writer

Ku. Azhagirisam
- கு. அழகிரிசாமி
- Born: 23 September 1923; Idaiseval, Tinnively District, Madras Presidency, British India (now in Thoothukudi District, Tamil Nadu, India)
- Died: 5 July 1970 (aged 46)
- Occupations: Novelist,Journalist, poet
- Awards: Sahitya Akademi Award (1970)

Ku. Alagirisami or G. Alagirisami (23 September 1923– 5 July 1970) was a writer from Tamil Nadu, India.

== Biography ==
He was born on 23 June 1923 in Idaiseval, a village near Kovilpatti in present-day Thoothukudi district of Tamil Nadu. He was a childhood friend of Ki. Rajanarayanan. He completed his SSLC and worked as a teacher and then as a clerk in the registrar office. He later became a journalist and wrote for Tamil publications like Tamil Mani, Sakthi and Prasanda Vikatan. His first short story Urakkam Kolluma was published in Ananda Bodhini in 1943. He became a sub-editor at Sakthi in 1947. He was a friend and contemporary of Vallikannan, Pudumaipithan and T. M. Chidambara Ragunathan. His first short story collection - Ku. Alagirisamy kathaigal was published in 1952 with a foreword from Kalki Krishnamurthy. In 1953, he went to Malaysia to work in Tamil Nesan. He married Seethalakshmi in 1955. During 1960-65 he worked as a sub-editor in Navasakthi. He freelanced during 1965–70. He worked at Soviet Nadu for a few months until his death. In 1967, the Government of Tamil Nadu's Department of Tamil Development awarded a prize for his play Kavichakravarthi (lit. Emperor among poets). He was noted for his short stories. In 1970, he was awarded the Sahitya Akademi Award for Tamil posthumously for his short story collection Anbalippu.

== Partial bibliography ==
=== Novels ===
- Doctor Anuradha
- Theerada Vilayattu
- Puthu veedu puthu ulagam
- Vaazhkai padhai

=== Children's fiction ===
- Moonru pillaigal
- Kaalivaram

=== Translations ===
*Laurence Binyon's Akbar

Maxim Gorky's books

- Leninudan sila naatkal
- Americavilae
- Yutham vendaam
- Virodhi
- Paniyavittal

=== Plays ===
- Vanja Magal
- Kavichakravarthi

=== Short story collections ===
- Anbalippu (Sahitya Akademi Award Winner)
- Sirikkavillai
- Thavappayan
- Varaprasadham
- Kaviyum kaadhalum
- Sevisaykka oruvan
- Pudhiya roja
- Thuravu
- ku. Alagirisami siruhathiakal (complete collection of short stories, April 2011)

=== Essay collections ===
- Ilakkiya then
- Thamizh thandha kaviyinbam
- Thamizh thandha kavichelvam
- Naan kanda ezhuthalargal

== See also ==
- List of Sahitya Akademi Award winners for Tamil
- List of Indian writers
- List of Tamil-language writers
