= List of Tamil-language writers =

Some of the Tamil language writers.

- A. Dakshinamurthy
- A. Muttulingam
- A. Srinivasa Raghavan
- Aadhavan
- Anuradha Ramanan
- Asokamithran
- A. S. Gnanasambandan
- Anuradha Ramanan
- Aravindan Neelakandan
- Akilan
- B. S. Ramiah
- Balakumaran
- Bharathidasan
- Brammarajan
- Ambai
- C. S. Chellappa
- Charu Nivedita
- Cho Dharman
- Dhamayanthi
- Devan
- Dhanushkodi Ramasamy
- Era Natarasan
- G. Thilakavathi
- Imayam
- Indira Parthasarathy
- Indra Soundar Rajan
- Jeyamohan
- Joe D'Cruz
- Jayakanthan
- Ki. Rajanarayanan
- Ki. Va. Jagannathan
- Kalki Krishnamurthy
- Kannadasan
- Ka. Naa. Subramaniam
- K. D. Thirunavukkarasu
- Karichan Kunju
- Ku. Alagirisami
- Kovi Manisekaran
- La Sa Ra
- Lakshmi
- Leena Manimekalai
- M. V. Venkatram
- Maharishi
- Meena Kandasamy
- M. Ilanchezhian
- M. Ramalingam
- Melanmai Ponnusamy
- Mu. Varadarajan
- Mu. Metha
- Nakulan
- N. Pichamoorthi
- Nandagopal
- Nanjil Nadan
- Na. Parthasarathy
- Neela Padmanabhan
- Pa. Raghavan
- Pattukkottai Prabakar
- Perumal Murugan
- Pon Arunachalam
- Ponneelan
- Poomani
- Prapanchan
- P. Sri Acharya
- Pudhumaipithan
- B. S. Ramaiya
- Ramanichandran
- Rajam Krishnan
- R. Dhandayudham
- Ra. Ki. Rangarajan
- Rajesh Kumar
- R. P. Sethu Pillai
- S. Ramakrishnan
- S. Abdul Rahman
- Sa. Kandasamy
- Seeni Viswanathan
- Sivasankari
- Sirpi Balasubramaniam
- Su. Venkatesan
- Su. Samuthiram
- Subha
- Sandilyan
- Sujatha
- Sundara Ramaswamy
- Thamarai
- Thangam Krishnamurthy
- Tamilvanan
- Tamilanban
- Thi. Janakiraman
- Thi. Ka. Sivasankaran
- T. M. Chidambara Ragunathan
- Thoppil Mohamed Meeran
- Vaasanthi
- V. C. Kulandaiswamy
- Vairamuthu
- Vannadhasan
- Vikraman
- Vittal Rao
- Vallikannan
- Vembu Vikiraman
