= Daniel Selvaraj =

Indian writer (1938–2019)

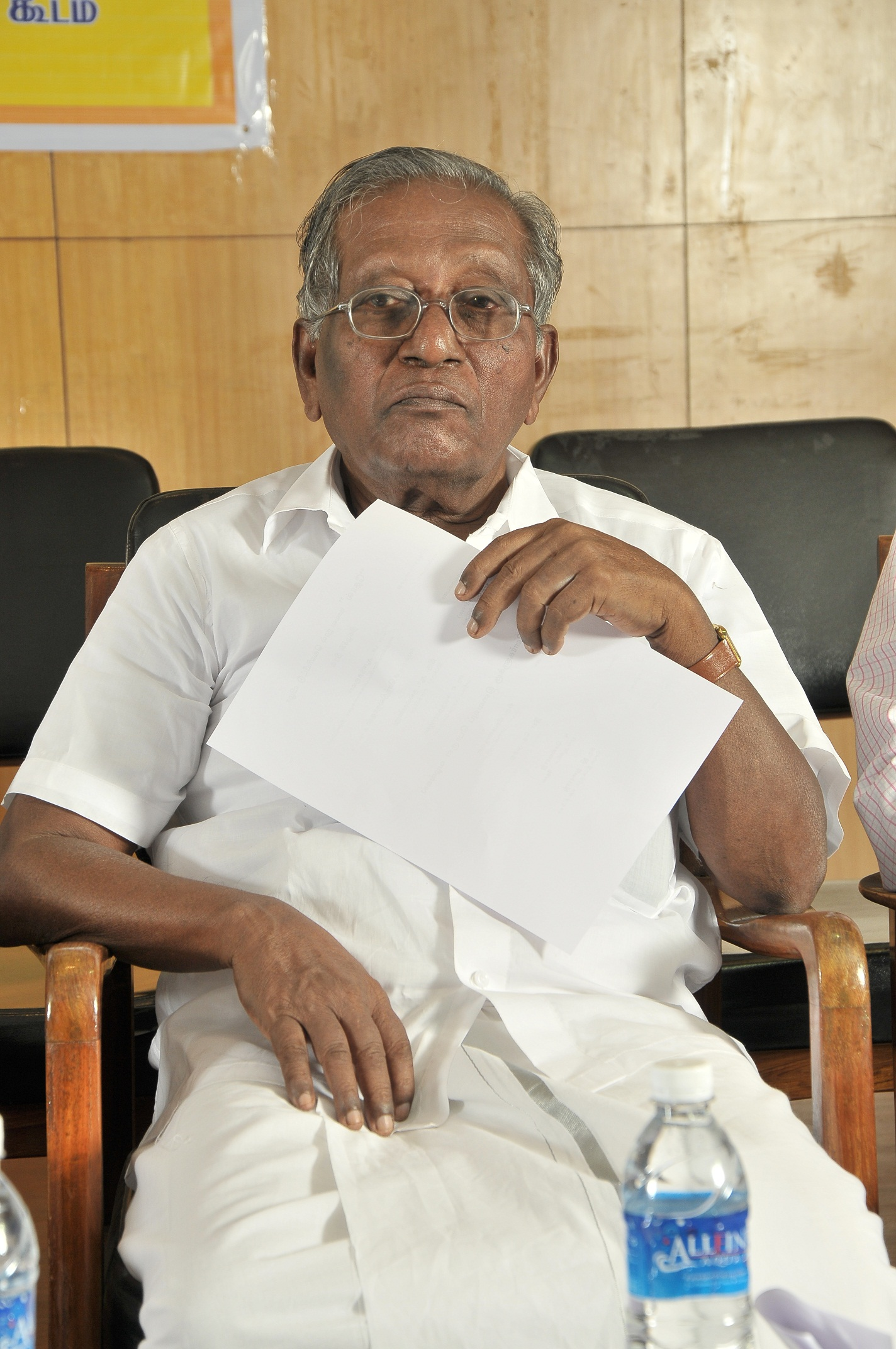
- Born: 14 January 1938; Thenkalam,Tinnevelly District,Madras Province, British India (now Tirunelveli, Tamil Nadu,India.
- Died: 20 December 2019 (aged 81)
- Occupations: lawyer, writer
- Spouse: Bharathaputhri
- Children: Siddharthan, Sevagan, Veda Gnanalakshmi
- Writing career
- Language: Tamil
- Subject: Literature
- Notable awards: Sahitya Akademi Award (2012)

D. Selvaraj (14 January 1938 – 20 December 2019) was an Indian writer who wrote novels, short stories, and plays in the Tamil language. A lawyer by profession, he was involved in various Communist and left-leaning writers' organisations such as the Democratic Writers Association of India and the Tamil Nadu Progressive Writers Association (TNPWA), of which he was an executive committee member. He received the Tamil Nadu Government's literary award for the best novel of 2011 for his work on tannery workers of Southern Tamil Nadu titled Thol. He did the field work for Thol for a decade before writing it. The novel was awarded the Sahitya Akademi award for Tamil in 2012.

== Biography ==
Selvaraj was born to Daniel and Gnanam Ammal in 1938 in Thenkalam, Tirunelveli district, Tamil Nadu, India. His parents were plantation labourers who worked in the tea plantations in Munnar at the Kerala- Tamil Nadu border. He obtained his B.A. degree in Tirunelveli (1959) Hindu College and his law degree in Madras (1962) Madras Law college. His early inspiration came from Maupassant short stories, Dickens and Thomas Hardy's novels. His Principal in Hindu college Professor Alexandar Gnanamuthu introduced him to Shakespeare and Selvaraj was hooked on good literature for his life. He published his first short story in Janasakthidaily's weekly magazine, the official magazine of Communist Party of India (CPI). During 1957-58, he also published regularly in the progressive literary magazine Shanthi run by T. M. Chidambara Ragunathan, along with Sundara Ramaswamy he was a regular contributor to "Shanthi". As a writer he was influenced by the Communist ideals of P. Jeevanandham and became a member of the TNPWA. His short stories and novels appeared regularly in literary magazines like Neethi, Semmalar, Kannadasan and Thamarai. His first noted work was the novel Malarum Sarugum (1967) written on the background of the peasant agitation in the Tirunelveli district. It is considered to be the first Dalit novel written in Tamil. He followed it with Thaeneer (1973) which was about the plight of the tea plantation workers. He wrote a number of plays, the most notable of which are yugasangamam (1968) and "Paatu Mudiyum Munnae". Yugasangamam was awarded the best play award by Tamil Nadu Government's literary association and is currently a part of the curriculum at the Tamil studies department, Delhi University. "Paatu Mudiyum Munnae" was staged all over Tamil Nadu by T.K. Balachander troupe and lyrics for the play were penned by Paatukkottai Kalayanasundaram - which led to a close relationship with this legendary poet. He sharpened his writing skills with constant criticism and guidance from Tho.Mu.Si. Raghunathan/ Thi.Ka.Sivasankaran/ Jeevanandam. In fact when Jeevanandam was the editor of "Thamarai" D.S. was the one editing the magazine behind the scenes. He spent years and years researching his novels before sitting down to pen them. His "Thol" novel is an apt example of that effort. He spent 10 years researching the novel in Dindigul tanneries and erstwhile workers in tanneries before writing it down. "Thol" was awarded the Tamil Nadu Government Award for the best novel of 2009 and the novel has been given the honour by Sahitya Akademi in 2012. He lived his last years in Dindigul. He was married to Bharathaputri and had three children (Siddharthan Prabhu, Sarvagan Prabhu, Veda gnana lakshmi all 3 married) . He happily shared his time between writing, his advocate practice and playing with his 5 grand children.

== Bibliography ==
- Malarum charugum (Novel) (Malligai, 1967)
- Theneer (Novel) (New Century book house, 1973)
- Moolathanam (Novel) (1977)
- Agnikundam (Novel) (1980)
- Yugasangamam (Play) (1968)
- Jeeva - Biography of P Jeevanandham (Sahitya Akademi, 2005)
- Saamichidambaranaar - Biography of Tamil writers (Sahitya Akademi, 2006).
- Pradosham (Varam:Chennai, 2007)
- Thole (2010) - Awarded best novel of the year by the Tamil Nadu Government - Presented by the Hon Chief Minister Dr. J. Jayalalitha on 13 April 2012

== See also ==
- List of Sahitya Akademi Award winners for Tamil
- List of Indian writers
- List of Tamil-language writers
