= Cho Dharman =

Indian Tamil writer

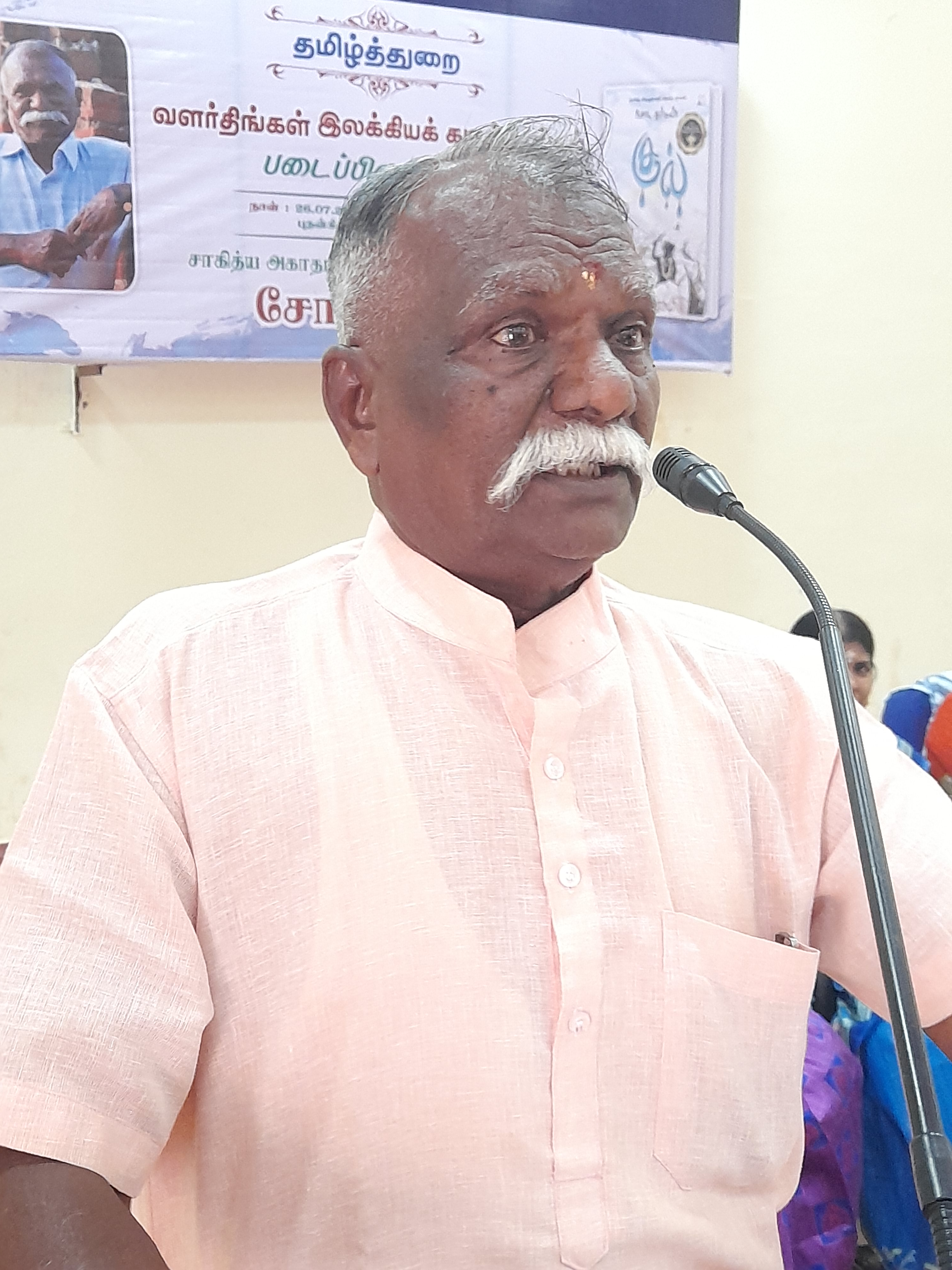
- Born: S. Dharmaraj; 8 August 1953 (age 73); Kovilpatti,Tirunelveli district,Madras State (now Tuticorin district, Tamil Nadu), India
- Occupations: Novelist,writer
- Relatives: Poomani (Maternal Uncle)
- Writing career
- Pen name: Cho Dharman
- Language: Tamil
- Period: 1992 - Till Now
- Genres: novel, novella
- Subject: Literature
- Notable awards: Sahitya Akademi Award (2019)

Cho Dharman (born 8 August 1953) is an Indian Tamil writer. He was born in Kovilpatti Taluk in Tuticorin district of Tamil Nadu. The real name is S. Dharmaraj. Cho Dharman's novel Koogai, a stunning account of Tamil lives in post-independence India, was translated into English as The Owl. Cho, has authored nine books, won several awards and much critical acclaim for his novels, non-fiction and short stories. He won the Sahitya Akademi award in 2019 under Tamil language category for his novel Sool.

== Books ==
=== Novel ===
- Sinavayal (சினவயல்)
- Vauval Desam (வௌவால் தேசம்)
- Pathimoonavathu Maiyavadi (பதிமூனாவது மையவாடி)
- Thoorvai (தூர்வை)
- Koogai (கூகை)
- Sool (சூல்)

=== Short Story ===
- PeruMoochu (பெருமூச்சு)
- Neerpalizhi (நீர்ப்பழி)
- Anbin Sippi (அன்பின் சிப்பி)

=== Essay ===
- Gramathu Chitthirangal (கிராமத்துச் சித்திரங்கள்)

=== Biography ===
- Villisai Vendhar Pichaikutty (வில்லிசை வேந்தர் பிச்சைக்குட்டி)

=== Poertry ===
- Cho. Dharman kavithaigal (சோ.தர்மன் கவிதைகள்)

=== Translated Work ===
- Koogai: The Owl.

=== Awards and honours ===
- Sahitya Academy Award Winner at 2019

== See also ==
- List of Sahitya Akademi Award winners for Tamil
- List of Indian writers
- List of Tamil-language writers
