= R. Dhandayudham =

Indian scholar, writer, critic and translator

- Born: R. Dhandayudham; 1939 (age 86–87)
- Writing career
- Language: Tamil
- Subject: Literature
- Notable awards: Sahitya Akademi Award (1975)

R. Dhandayudham (b. 1939 – d. ?) was a Tamil scholar, writer, critic and translator from Tamil Nadu, India.

== Biography ==
Dhandyudham was a senior lecturer in the Indology department of University of Malaya, Malaysia. He has published a number of critical and research works on Tamil literature and a few works of fiction as well. His critical works are in the curriculum of Tamil Virtual University and Bharathidasan University. In 1975, he was awarded the Sahitya Akademi Award for Tamil for his literary criticism Tharkaala Tamil Illakkiyam (lit. Modern Tamil literature). A literary organisation (Doctor Dhandayudham Ilakkiya Peravai) has been established in his memory in Malaysia.

== Partial bibliography ==
=== Non-fiction ===
- Tharkaala Tamil Illakkiyam
- Malaysia Tamil ilakkiya varalaaru
- A study of the sociological novels in Tamil
- Aalaya vazhipattil Tamil
- A survey of modern Tamil literature,

=== Fiction ===
- Malarum Malar
- Poyyana nyayangal

== See also ==
- List of Sahitya Akademi Award winners for Tamil
- List of Indian writers
- List of Tamil-language writers
