= Nanjil Nadan =

Tamil writer

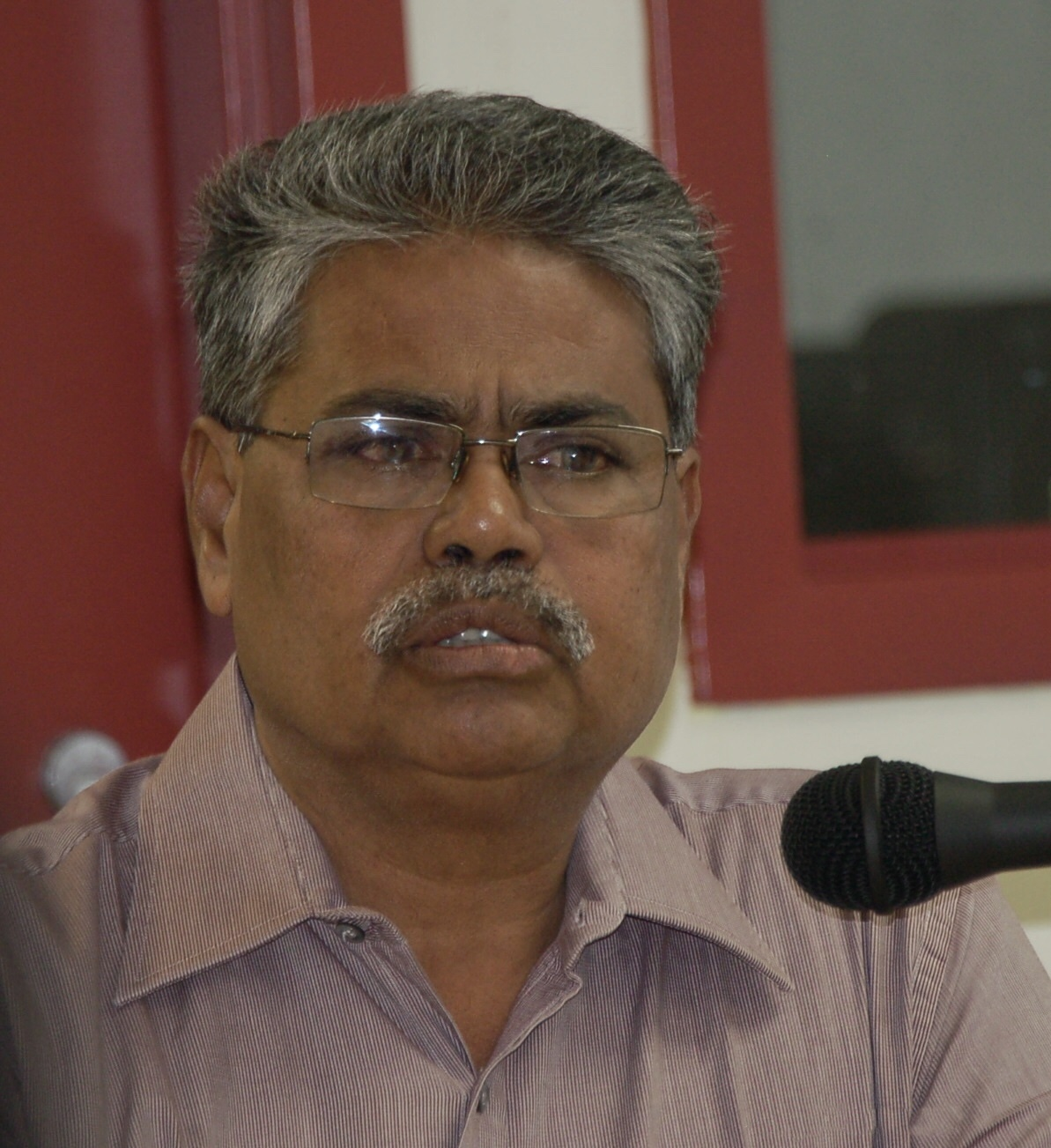
- Born: G. Subramaniam; 31 December 1947 (age 78); Veera Narayanamangalam in Kanyakumari District
- Citizenship: Indian
- Writing career
- Pen name: Nanjil Nadan
- Language: Tamil
- Subject: Literature
- Notable awards: Sahitya Akademi Award (2010)

Nanjil Nadan is the pseudonym of G. Subramaniam (born 31 December 1947), a Sahitya academy winning Tamil writer from Tamil Nadu, India.

== Biography ==
Nanjil Nadan was born in Veera Narayanamangalam, Thazhakudy in Kanyakumari District to Ganapathiya Pillai and Saraswathi Ammal. Born G. Subramaniam, he uses the pseudonym Nanjil Nadan (means a native of the Nanjil Nadu – the area comprising the taluks of Agastheeswaram and Thovalai in Kanyakumari district ). He has a M.Sc degree in Mathematics. He works at W. H. Brady and Co in Coimbatore. He began his literary career by working for Bombay Tamil Sangam's literary magazine Aedu. His first short story, "Viradham", was published in July 1975 in the magazine Deepam, run by Na. Parthasarathy. In 2002, his novel Thalaikeezh Vigithangal was made into a Tamil film titled Solla Marandha Kadhai directed by Thangar Bachan. In 2010 he was awarded the Sahitya Akademi Award for Tamil for his short story collection Soodiya poo soodarka. His novel Ettu Thikkum Madha Yaanai is being made into a Tamil film titled Padithurai. He has authored six novels, 112 short stories, two short story anthologies, five essay collections, and two poetry collections. Some of his works have been translated to English, Malayalam, and French and included as part of the curriculum in several educational institutions.

Nanjil Nadan is now penning a book on his community, the Vellalas of Nanjilnadu.

He is married to Santhiya. They have one son and one daughter. His daughter Sangeetha is a medical doctor, and his son Ganesh is an engineer.

== Awards and recognitions ==
- Tamil Literary Garden has announced that Nanjil Nadan has won the Iyal Award, their Lifetime Achievement Award for 2012. He received the award formally in June 2013
- He won the Sahitya Akademi award in 2010 in Tamil language category for his collection of short stories Soodiya poo soodarka.
- Received the Non-Fiction award from The Tamil Literary Garden, Canada for the book 'Nathiyin Pizhaiyandru Narumpunal Inmai'
- Ilakkiya Sinthanai Award (for Viradham)
- Govt of Tamil Nadu literary award for best novel (for Sathuranga Kudhirai)
- Kasthuri Seenivasan Trust Award
- Thirupur Tamil Sangam award
- Kannadasan Award
- Lily Devasigamani Award

== Bibliography ==
=== Novels ===
- Thalaikeezh vigithangal
- Mamisapadaippu
- Enbiladanai veyilkayum
- Midhavai
- Ettuthikkum madhayaanai
- Sadhuranga Kuthirai

=== Short stories ===
- "Koambai" (கோம்பை)
- "Deivangal Onaigal Aadugal (தெய்வங்கள் ஓநாய்கள் ஆடுகள்)"
- "Vakkuporukkigal (வாக்குப் பொறுக்கிகள்)"
- "Uppu"
- "Peikkottu"
- "Prandhu"
- "Khan Sahib"
- "Soodiya Poo Soodarka"
- "Kongu Ther Vazhkkai"
- "Tholkudi"
- "Val Virunthu (Kumbamuni Sirukathaigal)"

=== Poetry ===
- Manullipambu
- Pachai Nayagi
- Vazhukkupparai

=== Non-fiction ===
- Nanjil Nattu Vellalar Vazhkai
- Theedhum Nandrum
- Nanjendrum Amudhendrum Ondru
- Thigambaram
- Kavalan kaavaan Yenin
- Panuval Potradhum
- Nathiyin Pizhayandru Narumpunal Inmai
- Ambaraathooni
- Sitrilakkiyangal
- Eppadi Paaduveno ?
- Ahan Surukel (Selected Articles)
- Kai Mann Alavu (Kunkumam Weekly Articles)

== See also ==
- List of Sahitya Akademi Award winners for Tamil
- List of Indian writers
- List of Tamil-language writers
