= Pon Arunachalam =

Tamil writer

Pon. Arunachalam
- Born: 27 June 1946 (age 78); Tuticorin, Tamilnadu
- Occupation: writer

Pon. Arunachalam is a Tamil writer from Tuticorin, India. He is the author of 250 short stories and 25 other works including novels and non-fiction works on the topics of self-improvement, astrology, poetry, history, biographies and other essays. He has carved a special place in the hearts of Tamil people with his family novels and self-help books.

== Life ==
Pon. Arunachalam was born in Tuticorin 27 June 1946. He completed his studies in 1968 and was appointed as a Senior Inspector of Cooperatives by the Tamil Nadu Service Commission in the year 1970. He got his first postings at Vellore during which period he started his literary career.

== Contributions ==
In 1973, his first short story was published in Vellore Malai Murasu. This golden period was an important phase in his development as he found more time to write. Subsequently he became a regular contributor to Tamil periodicals including Thinamani Kadir, Kungumam, Devi, Cinema Express, Ananda Vikatan, Kumudam, Idayam Pesukirathu, Rani, Thai, Vanoli Kathai Mandram.

His novels were published in Malai Mathi, and Thinamani Kadir monthly.

== Prizes and publications ==
Arunachalam was rewarded the first prize for the "Devi Weekly" short story competition held in 1990.

The publishing house (Manimekalai Prasuram) Chennai run by Lena Tamilvanan & Ravi Tamilvanan published all his distinguished writings and released 25 books.

== Service ==
Thiru Pon Arunachalam retired as Deputy Registrar Cooperative societies in the year 2002. But his literary contribution still continues.

== Publications ==
1. சுவரில் ஒரு முகம் சிரிக்கிறது - நாவல்
2. ஒரு மலரின் ஏக்கம் - சிறுகதை தொகுப்பு
3. வீட்டுப் பறவைக்கு விடுதலை உண்டா? - சிறுகதை தொகுப்பு
4. வித்யாவுக்கு விடிந்தால் கல்யாணம் - சிறுகதை தொகுப்பு
5. ஒரு குயில் தனியாக பாடுகிறது - நாவல்
6. பாசத்தின் விலை - சிறுகதை தொகுப்பு
7. வானத்தில் ஒரு பூந்தோட்டம் - நாவல்
8. கதை எழுதும் வெற்றி ரகசியம் - சுய முன்னேற்ற கட்டுரை
9. இதயத்தில் வரைந்த ஓவியம் - நாவல்
10. அம்மா வருவாளா ?- நாவல்
11. ஆச்சர்யப்படுத்தும் ஜாதக ரகசியங்கள் - கட்டுரை
12. வாழ்வின் வெற்றி ரகசியங்கள் - கட்டுரை
13. நல்வழி காட்டும் நாராயண குருவின் வாழ்க்கை வரலாறு - சரிதை
14. நூலகங்களின் புரவலர் பொன் சுப்பையாவின் எடுத்துக்காட்டான வாழ்கை - சரிதை
15. ஒருத்தி ஒருவனை நினைத்து விட்டால் - நாவல்
16. தமிழே அமுதே - கவிதை தொகுப்பு
17. முல்லை தோட்டத்து வெண்ணிலா - நாவல்
18. நெஞ்சில் மலர்ந்த நேசம் - நாவல்
19. தாலிக்கு இத்தனை முடிச்சுக்களா ? - சிறுகதை தொகுப்பு
20. ஒரு எழுத்தாளரின் அமெரிக்கப் பயண அனுபவங்கள் (2009 release)
21. நல் வரம் தரும் திருப்பதி மற்றும் நவ திருப்பதிகள்
22. தமிழ் கடவுள் முருகனின் அற்புதங்கள்
23. அவள் இல்லாமல் ஒரு வாழ்க்கையா?
24. ஸ்ரீ ஷீரடி சாய்பாபாவின் அற்புதங்கள்
25. ஓர் எழுத்தாளரின் இங்கிலாந்து, ஸ்காட்லாந்து, அமெரிக்கப் பயண அனுபவங்கள் (2015 release)
