= K. D. Thirunavukkarasu =

Tamil scholar, writer, critic and translator (1931–1989)

- Born: 20 November 1931; Karunguzhi,Chengalpattu district,Tamil Nadu), India
- Died: 5 May 1989 (aged 57)
- Occupation: Literary criticism
- Writing career
- Pen name: Ee-Paa
- Language: Tamil
- Subject: Literature
- Notable awards: Sahitya Akademi Award (1974)
- Website: professorkdthirunavukkarasu.com

K. D. Thirunavukkarasu (1931–1989) was an Indian Tamil scholar, writer, critic and translator from Tamil Nadu, India.

Thirunavukkarasu was an alumnus of Pachaiyappa's College, Chennai. He obtained a M.A, M.Litt. and a PhD and worked as a professor at the International Institute of Tamil Studies in Chennai. In 1974, he was awarded the Sahitya Akademi Award for Tamil for his literary criticism Thirukkural Needhi Illakkiyam (lit. Thirukkural, a moralist literature). He died in 1989.

== Partial bibliography ==
- Chieftains of the Sangam age
- A Critical study of Dr. Mu. Va's works
- Thirukkural needhi illakkiyam
- Thirukkural karpanai thiranum nataka nalanum
- Arunmozhi aayvuth thogudhi
- Then kizhakku aasiya nadugalil thamilar panpadu
- (trans.)Rajaram mohan roy (biography)
- (trans.)Jeevanandha Das (biography)

== See also ==
- List of Sahitya Akademi Award winners for Tamil
- List of Indian writers
- List of Tamil-language writers
