= Aadhavan Sundaram =

Indian writer

Aadhavan
- Born: K. S. Sundaram; 21 March 1942; Kallidaikurichi, Tinnevely District, Madras Province, British India (now Tirunelveli District, Tamil Nadu, India)
- Died: 19 July 1987 (aged 45); Shringeri, Karnataka, India
- Citizenship: Indian
- Occupations: Author, Assistant Editor
- Spouse: Hema Sundaram
- Children: 2
- Writing career
- Pen name: Aadhavan
- Language: Tamil
- Period: until 1987
- Genres: Novels, Novellas, Short Stories
- Subject: Literature
- Notable works: En Peyar Ramaseshan; Kagidha Malargal; Mudalil Iravu Varum
- Notable awards: Sahitya Akademi Award (1987)

Aadhavan is the pseudonym of K.S. Sundaram, 21 March 1942 – 19 July 1987), a Tamil writer from Tamil Nadu, India.

== Biography ==
Sundaram was born in Kallidaikurichi (near Ambasamudram in present-day Tirunelveli District) and obtained his education in Delhi. He worked briefly for Indian Railways. Later he joined the National Book Trust of India as an assistant editor. He married Hema in 1976. He started his literary career as a writer of stories for children in the magazine Kannan. He wrote under the pseudonym Aadhavan (lit. The Sun). His most noted work was the novel En peyar Ramaseshan (lit. My name is Ramaseshan), which was translated into Russian by Vitaliy Furnika and sold over a hundred thousand copies. In 1987, he drowned while swimming in a river at Shringeri. He was awarded the Sahitya Akademi Award for Tamil posthumously for his collection of short stories Mudalil iravu varum (lit. First comes the night).

== Bibliography ==
=== Novels ===
- En Peyar Ramaseshan
- Kagitha Malargal
- Kanagathin Naduvae

=== Novellas ===
- Iravukku mun varuvadhu maalai
- Siragugal
- Meetchiyai thedi
- Ganapathi oru keezhmattathu oozhiyan
- Nadhiyum Malayum
- Penn, thozhi, thalaivi

=== Short story collections ===
- Singa Rajakumari
- Mudalil Iravu Varum
- Kanavu kumizhigal
- Kaal vali
- Oru arayil irandu naarkaligal
- Pudhumaipithanin dhrogam
- nilalgal

=== Plays ===
- Puzhudhiyil veenai

== See also ==
- List of Sahitya Akademi Award winners for Tamil
- List of Indian writers
- List of Tamil-language writers
