= Rajam Krishnan =

- Born: Rajam Krishnan; 5 November 1925; Musiri, Trichinopoly District, Madras Presidency, British India,(now in Tiruchirappalli district, Tamil Nadu, India.
- Died: 20 October 2014 (aged 88); Porur, Chennai, Tamil Nadu, India
- Citizenship: Indian
- Spouse: Muthu Krishnan
- Parent(s): Yajna Narayanan (Father) & Meenakshi (Mother)
- Writing career
- Pen name: Lekhini
- Language: Tamil
- Subject: Literature
- Notable awards: Sahitya Akademi Award (1973)
- Movements: communism, feminism

Rajam Krishnan (05th November 1925 - 20 October 2014), was a feminist Tamil writer from Tamil Nadu, India.

== Biography ==
Rajam Krishnan was born 05th November 1925 on to her parent Yajna Narayanan & Meenakshi in Musiri, Tiruchirapalli district.Rajam was married to Muthu Krishnan, an Electricity Board engineer. . She had very little formal education and appears to have been largely an autodidact..

== Career ==
She started publishing in her twenties. She is known for writing well researched social novels on the lives of people usually not depicted in modern Tamil literature - poor farmers, salt pan workers, small-time criminals, jungle dacoits, under-trial prisoners and female labourers. She has written more than 80 books. Her works include forty novels, twenty plays, two biographies and several short stories. In addition to her own writing, she was a translator of literature from Malayalam to Tamil. In their anthology of Women's Writing in India in the 19th and 20th Century, Susie J Tharu and K Lalita credit Krishnan with "having set a new trend in Tamil literature," referring to the extensive research that Krishnan did in evaluating social conditions as background for her writing.

In 1973, she was awarded the Sahitya Akademi Award for Tamil for her novel Verukku Neer. In 2009, her works were nationalised by the Government of Tamil Nadu, for a compensation of Rs. 300,000. It was a rare occurrence as only works of dead writers are usually nationalised in Tamil Nadu.

== Death ==
Rajam was left poor and destitute in her later years and had to be admitted to an old age home. She died on 20 October 2014.

== Bibliography ==
- Uthara Kaandam - (உத்தர காண்டம்)
- Kurinji Then - (குறிஞ்சித்தேன்)Kannada & Malayalam Translations are published
- Valaikaram - (வளைக்கரம்)
- Verukku Neer - (வேருக்கு நீர்)Kannada Translation available
- Malargal - (மலர்கள்)
- Mullum Malarndhadhu - (முள்ளும் மலர்ந்தது)
- Paadaiyil Padinda Adigal - (பாதையில் பதிந்த அடிகள்)
- Alaivaai Karayile - (அலைவாய் கரையிலே)
- Karippu Manigal - (கரிப்பு மணிகள்)
- Mannakattu puntulikal - (மண்ணகத்துப் பூந்துளிகள்)
- Sathiya Velvi - (சத்திய வேள்வி)
- Suzhalil Mithakkum Deepangal (Lamps in the Whirlpool) (1987)

== Awards and recognitions ==
- New York Herald Tribune International Award for a short story (1950)
- Kalaimagal award (1953)(நாவல் 'பெண் குரல்')
- 'Malargal' (Flowers) Ananda Vikatan Novel Prize Winner(1958)('மலர்கள்' ஆனந்த விகடன் பரிசு நாவல் 1958)
- Sahitya Akademi Award for Tamil for Verukku Neer (Water for the Roots) (1973)
- Soviet Land Nehru Award (1975) for Vailaikkaram (Wrist with Bangles)
- Thiru. Vi. Ka award (1991)

== See also ==
- List of Sahitya Akademi Award winners for Tamil
- List of Indian writers
- List of Tamil-language writers
