= Jayanthasri Balakrishnan =

Public speaker

Dr. Jayanthasri Balakrishnan
- Born: Karnataka

Dr. Jayanthasri Balakrishnan is a public speaker and a retired Professor of English, from PSG College of Arts and Science, Coimbatore, Tamil Nadu.

== Education ==
Dr. Jayanthasri Balakrishnan as an Educationalist strongly believes in bringing about attitudinal improvement and social development through value based education. Helping people realize their potential and uniqueness is her prime concern which adds depth, dimension and difference to her motivational talk. Dr. Jayanthasri Balakrishnan is a former Professor and Reader of English in PSG College of Arts and Science, Coimbatore, with 35 years of teaching experience. She is a double doctorate, having been awarded two Ph.D. Degrees, one in English by the Pondicherry University in 1998, and the second one in Tamil by Bharathiar University, Coimbatore in 2009. She also holds a master's degree in education from the University of Madras. She is a registered Guide of Bharathiar University for Ph.D. for both English and Tamil. She did her research in the 'English renderings of Kuṟuntokai', which deals with the problems of translating the Tamil text Kuṟuntokai. For her doctorate in Tamil, she submitted her thesis on Tamil writer Jayakanthan's novellas.

== Career ==
She is a Resource Person of the UGC for various Indian Universities. She is an educationalist, writer, poet, feminist and a translator and has widely varying interests including literary theory, theatre and drama. She has been lauded by 'The Hindu' in 'The Personality of the week' for her distinct thoughts on education. Apart from taking part in several television programs, she also presents a program named Manadhil urudhi vendum in Kalaignar TV.

== Awards ==
Having worked as the Chief Editor in Central Institute of Classical Tamil, Mysore she was able to bring an updated translated version of Tamil vintage classic, 'Kuṟuntokai' in English. She worked as the Sub-editor of the Tamil Magazine Disaigal for a short span of time. In an open competition held by the popular Tamil magazine Ananda Vikatan, she won 'The Best short story writer award' from the hands of Tamil writer Sujatha. She has delivered many talks on writer Jayakanthan. She has also published her short story collection in the name of "Mazhaivil Manidhargal" (Men of Rainbows) and a collection of essays named "Mouna Iraichal". As a translator, she has translated select poems of Ainkurunuru and some of the works of Tamil writers such as Bharathi, Kalyanji and so. The translation of Tamil poet Sirpi Balasubramaniam's 'Poojiyangalin Sangili' is published as 'The Chain of Absolutes'.
