= R. P. Sethu Pillai =

Tamil scholar (1896–1961)

- Born: R. P. Sethu Pillai; 2 March 1896; Rajavallipuram
- Died: 25 April 1961 (aged 65)
- Education: Master of Arts, Bachelor of Law
- Occupations: Lawyer, Professor
- Employer: Madras University
- Spouse: Alwar Janaki
- Awards: Sahitya Akademi Award (1955)

Signature
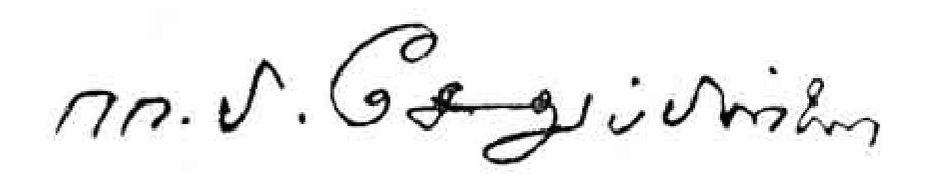

R. P. Sethu Pillai (Tamil: ரா. பி. சேது பிள்ளை) (1896–1961), was a Tamil scholar, writer and professor of Tamil at the University of Madras.

== Biography ==
Sethu pillai was born at Rajavallipuram, Tirunelveli District in 1896. He was educated and practiced as a lawyer. He became interested in Tamil after listening to a speech of Maraimalai Adigal at Palayamkottai in June 1912. After a brief career in politics (he was the Vice Chairman of the Tirunelveli Municipal Council), he became a teacher. During 1930-36, he taught at Annamalai University. In 1936, he became a senior lecturer at the Madras University. In 1946, he succeeded Prof. Vaiyapuri Pillai as the Reader of Tamil and the Head of the Tamil department in the University. In 1948, the readership was converted to a full professorship and he became Professor of Tamil. From 1946 till his death in 1961 he was the Head of the Tamil department. In 1955, he won the first ever Sahitya Akademi Award for Tamil for his series of essays titled Tamil inbam. In 1957, he was awarded a D. Litt degree (honoris causa). Sethu pillai was a scholar of Tamil and wrote more than twenty five books. Among his notable works is his biography of Bishop Robert Caldwell titled Caldwell Aiyar Sarithram. He was popularly called Sollin Selvar (lit. the child of the word) for his proficiency in Tamil. He was a member of the Tamil advisory board for the Sahitya Akademi since its inception in 1954. He was involved in the creation of the Tamil encyclopaedia and the last volume of the Tamil lexicon. He also wrote a number of books and articles in English. The most noted among them is his edition of Francis Whyte Ellis' commentary of Tirukkural and Dravidian comparative vocabulary. Sethu pillai died in 1961. In 2009, Sethu Pillai's works were nationalised by the Government of Tamil Nadu. He was the one to give the title 'Silambu Selvar' to Ma. Po. Si.(M.P.Sivagnanam) praising the immense knowledge he had in the field of Silappatikaram epic.

== Bibliography ==
=== Tamil ===
- Thamizhakam oorum perum
- Tamil inbam
- Velum villum
- Velin verri
- Alayum kalayum
- Vaazhi Vaazhi Valluvar
- Caldwell Aiyar Sarithram
- Kristhuva Tamil tondarkal
- Tiruvalluvar nool nayam
- Tamil nattu navamanigal
- Aatrangkarayinile
- Kattar karayilae
- Tamil kavithai kalanchiyam
- Viramanagar
- Tamilar veeram
- Tenmozhigalil palamozhigal
- Sollin Selvar
- Medai Pechu

=== English ===
- Ellis commentary of Tirukural
- Dravidian comparative vocabulary
- Common Dravidian proverbs and words and their significance

== See also ==
- List of Sahitya Akademi Award winners for Tamil
- List of Indian writers
- List of Tamil-language writers
