= Vannadasan =

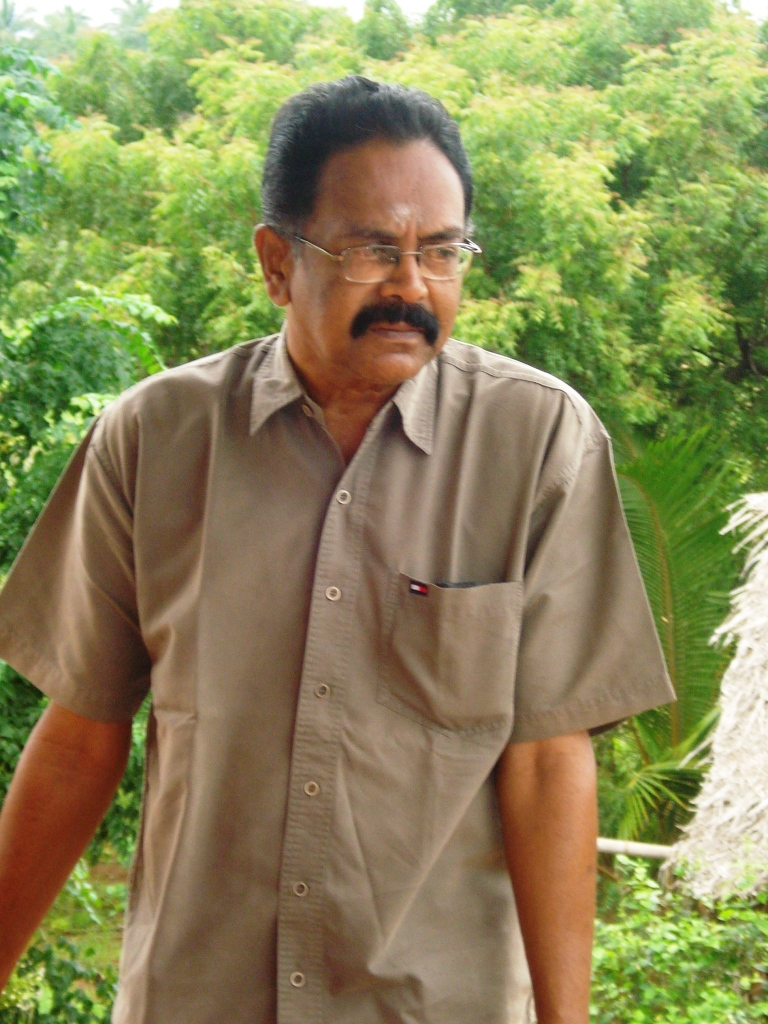
- Born: Siva Kalyana Sundaram; 22 August 1946 (age 80); Tinnevelly, Madras Province, British India (now Tirunelveli, Tamil Nadu, India)
- Occupations: Poet, short story writer
- Relatives: Thi. Ka. Sivasankaran (father)
- Writing career
- Pen name: Vannadasan, Kalyanji
- Language: Tamil
- Subject: Literature
- Notable awards: Sahitya Akademi Award (2016); Vishnupuram Literary Award (2016)

Vannadasan, aka Kalyanji is a Tamil writer from India. He was born as Siva Kalyana Sundaram in Tirunelveli in 1946, where he currently resides.. He is a son of Thi. Ka. Sivasankaran, a renowned Tamil writer. He writes short stories and non fiction articles under the pseudonym of Vannadhasan and poems under Kalyanji..He is a retired State Bank of India employee.

== Bibliography ==
=== Short Story ===
- Vannadasan Sirukadhaigal - 3 Volumes (வண்ணதாசன் சிறுகதைகள் - 3 தொகுதிகள்)
- Kalaikka Mudiyaatha Oppanaigal (கலைக்க முடியாத ஒப்பனைகள்) -1976
- Thottathukku Veliyilum Sila Pookkal (தோட்டத்துக்கு வெளியிலும் சில பூக்கள்) -1978
- Samaveli (சமவெளி)-1983
- Peyar Theriyamal Oru Paravai (பெயர் தெரியாமல் ஒரு பறவை) -1985
- Manusha Manusha (மனுஷா மனுஷா) -1990
- Kanivu (கனிவு)-1992
- Nadugai (நடுகை)-1996
- Krishnan Vaitha Veedu (கிருஷ்ணன் வைத்த வீடு)-2000
- Oliyile Therivadhu (ஒளியிலே தெரிவது)-2010
- Oru Siru Isai (ஒரு சிறு இசை)-2013
- Naabi kamalam (நாபிக்கமலம்)-2015

=== Poetry ===
- Uyara Parathal (உயரப் பறத்தல்)-1998

Some of his poems are translated by Jayanthasri Balakrishnan in English in her blog, though not published.

=== Articles ===
- Agam Puram in Anandha Viktan.

== Awards ==
- 2006: Received title of Kalaimamani Award by the Government of Tamil Nadu, which is the highest state honour in the field of Arts.
- 2016: Won the Sahitya Akademi Award for his short story collection Oru Siru Isai.
- 2016: Recipient of Vishnupuram Literary Award.

== See also ==
- List of Sahitya Akademi Award winners for Tamil
- List of Indian writers
- List of Tamil-language writers
