= A. S. Gnanasambandan =

Tamil writer, scholar and literary critic

- Born: Arasankudi Saravana Gnanasambandan; 10 November 1916; Arasankudi, Trichinopoly District,Madras Presidency, British India,(now in Tiruchirappalli district, Tamil Nadu, India.
- Died: 27 August 2002 (aged 85); Chennai),Tamil Nadu, India
- Spouse: Rajaammal
- Children: Meigandan, Saravanan (sons), Sivakami Sundari, Pankajachelvi, Anbuchelvi, Meera (Daughters)
- Parent(s): A. M. Saravanan (Father) & Sivakami (Mother)
- Writing career
- Pen name: Aa. Sa. Gna
- Language: Tamil
- Genres: Short Story, Novel, Novella
- Notable awards: Sahitya Akademi Award (1985)

Arasankudi Sarvana Gnanasambandan (10 November 1916 – 27 August 2002), was a Tamil writer, scholar and literary critic from Tamil Nadu, India. He is also known by his Tamil initials as Aa. Sa. Gna and A. S. Gnanasambandan.

== Biography ==
Gnanasambandan was born in Arasankudi near Kallanai in Tiruchirapalli district. His parents were Aa. Mu. Saravana Mudaliar(Arasankudi Muthuswamy Sarvana Mudaliar) and Sivakami. His father was a noted Tamil scholar, who had co-authored a commentary on Thiruvilayadal Puranam, a Saivite devotional epic. Gnanasambandan finished his schooling at Board High School, Lalgudi and signed up for intermediate classes in Physics at Annamalai University.

His Tamil knowledge was noticed by the Tamil scholar Somasundara Bharathi, who was a professor of Tamil at the university. He convinced Gnanasambandan to switch his major to Tamil. During his time at Annamalai University, he befriended noted scholars like V. S. Srinivasa Sastri, Thiru. Vi. Ka and The. Po. Meenakshi Sundaram. He graduated with a masters in Tamil and joined Pachaiyappa's College as a lecturer of Tamil in 1942, where he worked till 1956.

== Writing career ==
A. S. Gnanasambandan's first noted book Ravanan, Maatchiyum Veezhchiyum was published in 1945. This book along with Kamban Kalai (1950) and Thambiyar Iruvar (1961) cemented his reputation as a scholar of Kambaramayanam. After leaving Pachaiyappa's he served as the production-in-charge of dramas in the Madras office of All India Radio during 1956–61. In 1959, he became the secretary of the Bureau of Tamil Publications. He was the head of the Tamil Nadu Text Book Society during 1969–72. In 1970, he returned to teaching and became the head of the Tamil department at Madurai Kamaraj University. He retired from the university in 1973 but later returned to become the Tagore Emeritus professor of Tamil. He spent his later years at Chennai and was involved in literary research. Gnanasamban is most noted as a saivite scholar, preparer of Tamil textbooks and lecturer on Tamil literature. His published works include 35 research books, 3 translations, a large number of textbooks and essays. In 1985, he was awarded the Sahitya Akademi Award for Tamil for his literary criticism - Kamban: Putiya Parvai (lit. Kamban - A fresh view).

In 2007, his works were nationalised by the Government of Tamil Nadu.

== Awards and recognitions ==
- Sahitya Akademi Award For Tamil Literature (1985)
- Kalaimamani Award Conferred by Tamil Nadu Government (1987)
- Thamizh Chemmal Award (1987)
- Ilakkia Sinthanai Award (1987)
- Thiru.VI.Ka. Award (1990)
- Kamban Mamani Award (1993)
- Raja Sir Annamalai Chettiar Memorial Award (1996)
- Thamizh Moodharingar Award (1998)
- Kural Peedam Award Conferred by Tamil Nadu Government (2000)
- Iyatramizh Chelvar Award (2000)

== Bibliography ==
- "Ravanan Matchiyum Veezhchiyum" (1945)
- "Thambiyar Iruvar" (1961)
- "Arasiyar Moovar"
- "Naadum Mannanum"
- "Agam"
- "Puram"
- "Magalir Valartha Tamil"
- "Kural Kanda Vazhvu"
- "Ilakkiak kalai" (1964)
- "Kamban Kalai" (1950)
- "Thellartu Nandi"
- "Puthia Konam"
- "Desia Ilakkiam"
- "Thiru.Vi.Ka"
- "Indrum Iniyum"
- "Kizhakkum Merkkum" (1971)
- "Spiritualism and Materialism –PSG memorial Lectures"
- "Barathiyum Barathidhasanum"
- "Thathuvamum Bakthiyum" (1974)
- "Manikkavasakar" (1974)
- "Kamban: Puthia Paarvai"
- "Periapuranam - Oru Aayvu"
- "Mandirangal Endral Enna"
- "Ilango Adigal Samayam edhu"
- "Kamban Edutha Muthukkal"
- "Pathinen puranam"
- "Arulalargal"
- "Raman-Panmuhanokkil"
- "Sekkizhar Thantha Selvam"
- "Nan Kanda Periavargal"
- "Thiruvasagam Sila Sindanaigal"
- "Tamil Nadaga Varalarum Sankaradas Swamigalum"
- "Mutrura Sindhanaigal"
- "Thottanaithoorum Manarkkeni"
- "Inamutham"
- "Thevara Thiruppathikangal" (1998)

== Translation work ==
Translation from English To Tamil:

- "Tagore's “Towards the Universal Man”-Anaithulaga Manithanai Nokki
- "John Dewey’s “Reconstruction in Philosophy” -Thathuva Sasthira Punaramaippu.
- "Henry David Thoreau's Biography-Thorovin Vazgkkai Varalaru.

== See also ==
- List of Sahitya Akademi Award winners for Tamil
- List of Indian writers
- List of Tamil-language writers
