= A. Srinivasa Raghavan =

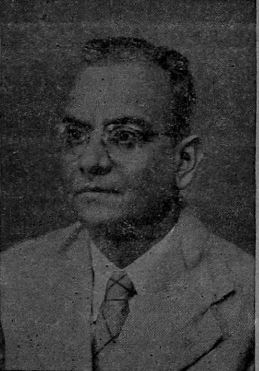
- Born: 23 October 1905; Kandiyur, Thiruvaiyaru, British India
- Died: 5 January 1975 (aged 69)
- Occupations: Writer, orator
- Awards: Sahitya Akademi Award (1968)

A. Srinivasa Raghavan (23 October 1905 – 5 January 1975) was a Tamil poet, writer, orator, and professor from Tamil Nadu, India. He was also popularly known by his initials as Aa. See. Ra (Tamil: அ. சீ. ரா).

== Biography ==
Srinivasa Raghavan was born in Kandiyur near Thiruvaiyaru. He completed his schooling in Nagapattinam and graduated from St. Joseph's College, Tiruchirapalli. He worked as a lecturer in the same college and the Vivekananda College, Chennai for some time. He also published two magazines - Sindhanai (a Tamil monthly) and Triveni (an English monthly). He published his works using the pseudonym Vagulaparanan.(Tamil: வகுளாபரணன்). He worked as a professor of English at St. Xavier's College, Chennai and M. D. T. Hindu College, Tirunelveli. During 1951-69 served as its Principal of V.O.C. College, Tuticorin. In 1968, he was awarded the Sahitya Akademi Award for Tamil for his collection of poetry Vellai Paravai (lit. The White Bird). He died in 1975. A complete edition of his works was published posthumously in 2005.

== Partial bibliography ==
- Vellai Paravai (poetry collection)
- Nigumbalai
- Avan Amaran
- Gowthami
- Udhaya Kanni (play)
- Mel Karru
- Ilakkiya Malargal
- Kaaviya Arangil
- Gurudevarin Kural
- Pudhu Merugu (literary commentary)
- Bharathiyin Kural (essay)
- Kambanilil irundhu sila idhazhgal (essay)
- Nammazhwar (biography)

== See also ==
- List of Sahitya Akademi Award winners for Tamil
- List of Indian writers
- List of Tamil-language writers
