= Neela Padmanabhan =

Indian writer

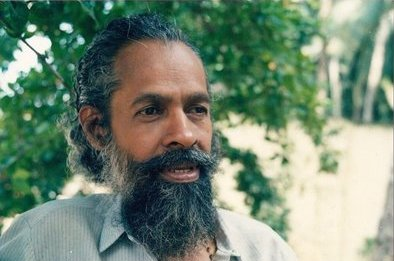
- Born: 26 April 1938 (age 88); Nagercoil,Travancore, British India,(now in Kanyakumari district, Tamil Nadu, India).
- Occupation: Deputy Chief Engineer (Rtd) at Kerala State Electricity Board
- Writing career
- Language: Tamil, Malayalam.
- Genres: Novelist, Short Story, Poet, Critic, Essayist, Translator
- Subject: Literature
- Notable awards: Sahitya Akademi Award (2007)

Neela Padmanabhan (born 26 April 1938), is a Sahitya Akademi Award winning Tamil & Malayalam writer from Tamil Nadu.

== Biography ==
Neela Padmanabhan was born in Kanyakumari District. He obtained a B. Sc in Physics and a degree in Electrical Engineering from Kerala University. He worked in the Kerala State Electricity Board till his retirement as Deputy Chief Engineer in 1993.His first noted work was the novel Thalaimuraigal (lit. Generations). He has written 20 novels, 10 short story collections, 4 volumes of poetry and 7 essay collections in Tamil. In Malayalam, he has published a novel, four short story collections and a single essay collection. Besides Tamil and Malayalam, he also has a few English works to his credit. During 1985-89 he was the Tamil editor at Sahitya Akademi and was the convener of the Akademi's Tamil advisory board during 1998-2002. In 2007, he was awarded the Sahitya Akademi Award for Tamil for his novel Ilai uthir kaalam (lit. Autumn). He had earlier won the Sahitya Akademi Translation Prize in 2003 for his translation of Ayyappa Paniker's works into Tamil. In 2010, his novel Thalaimuraigal was made into a Tamil film titled Magizhchi (lit. Happiness). His most noted work is his novel Pallikondapuram.(lit. Where the Lord sleeps). He currently lives in Thiruvananthapuram.

== Partial bibliography ==
=== Novels ===
- Thalaimuraikal (1968)
- Pallikondapuram (1970)
- Filekal (1973)
- Uravugal (1975)
- Min ulagam (1976)
- Yaathirai (1977)
- Anubavangal (1977)
- Samar (1977)
- Nerru Vanthavan (1978)
- Udaya Tharagai (1980)
- Vattathin veliyae (1980)
- Bhagavathi kovil theru (1981)
- Bothayil karaithavaigal (1985)
- Thee (1985)
- Murivugal (1985)
- Therodum veedhi (1987)
- Thee Thee (1990) (Malayalam)
- Dhavam seidhavargal (1991)
- Vellam (1994)
- Koondil pakshigal (1995)
- Ilai uthir kaalam (2005)

=== Short story collections ===
- Moham muppathaandu (1969)
- Sandayum Sambandhamum (1972)
- Moondravathu naal (1974)
- Irandavathu mugam (1978)
- Naagammava (1978)
- Siragadikal (1978)
- Kathakal irupathu (1980) (Malayalam)
- Sathityanin sannithiyil (1985)
- Erumbukal (1987) (Malayalam)
- Vaana veethiyil (1988)
- Arkande Koanil (1997) (Malayalam)
- Avaravar antharangam (1998)
- Verathavar(2003) (Malayalam)

== See also ==
- List of Sahitya Akademi Award winners for Tamil
- List of Indian writers
- List of Tamil-language writers
