= Bharathidasan =

Tamil poet, writer, freedom fighter, social reformer (1891–1964)

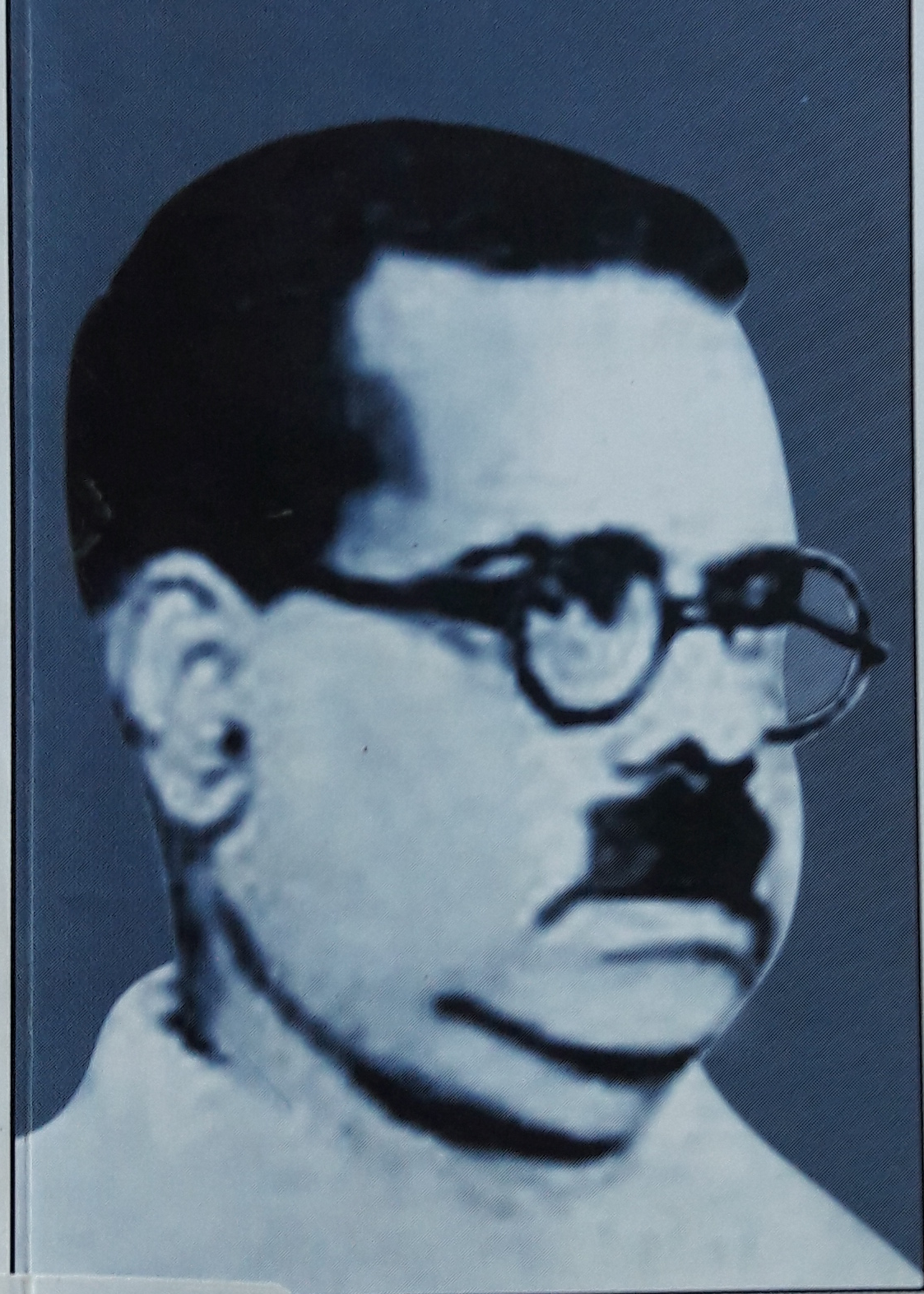
- Born: K. Subburathinam; 29 April 1891; Pondicherry, French India (now Puducherry, India)
- Died: 21 April 1964 (aged 72); Madras, Madras State (now Chennai, Tamil Nadu), India
- Occupations: Teacher, Tamil poet, Tamil activist
- Spouse: Pazhani Ammal
- Children: Saraswathi Kannappan (Daughter); Mannarmannan (Son); Vasantha Dhandapani (Daughter); Ramani Sivasubramaniyan (Daughter)
- Parent(s): Father: Kanagasabai; Mother: Lakshmi
- Writing career
- Period: Pure Tamil movement
- Notable awards: Sahitya Akademi Award (1969)

Bharathidasan (IPA: /ˈbɑːˌrʌðiˈðɑːˌsʌn/; born K. Subburathinam 29 April 1891 – 21 April 1964) was a 20th-century Tamil poet and rationalist writer whose literary works handled mostly socio-political issues. He was deeply influenced by the Tamil poet Subramania Bharathi and named himself "Bharathi dasan" meaning follower or adherent of Bharathi. His greatest influence was Periyar and his self-respect movement. Bharathidasan's writings served as a catalyst for the growth of the Self-Respect Movement in Tamil Nadu. In addition to poetry, his views found expression in plays, film scripts, short stories and essays. The Government of Puducherry union territory has adopted the song of Invocation to Mother Tamil, written by Bharathidasan as the state song of Puducherry (Tamil Thai Valthu (Puducherry)).

== Life ==
Kanaka Subburathinam was born in Puducherry (then called Pondicherry) on 29 April 1891 to Kanagasabai Mudaliar and Lakshmi Ammal. He was deeply influenced by the Tamil poet and freedom fighter Subramania Bharathi, who mentored him and hence Subburathinam named himself "Bharathi dasan" meaning follower or adherent of Bharathi. He is popularly known as Bharathidasan (Tamil: பாரதிதாசன்). Bharathidasan was an active participant in the Indian independence movement, he opposed both the British Raj and the French colonial government. He was imprisoned for voicing his views against the French Government that was ruling Pondicherry at that time. Bharathidasan was a poet in his own right, writing mostly on socio-political issues like women's liberation, rationalism, and against caste discrimination. He was greatly influenced by the great rationalist leader and social reformer, Periyar E. V. Ramaswami. Bharathidasan became one of the key figures in the Dravidian rationalist movement. He was bestowed the titles ‘puratchi kavinjar’ (revolutionary poet) and 'paa vendhar' (king of poetry) to honor his excellence in Tamil poetry and he was widely known by his titles. Bharathidasan works were nationalized meaning brought into public domain in 1991 by the then Chief Minister of Tamil Nadu M. Karunanidhi. Bharathidasan's works can be found at the open access Tamil literature repository Project Madurai.

He remained a prolific writer and poet till he died on 21 April 1964, a week before his 73rd birthday. He was awarded the Sahitya Academy Award posthumously for his Tamil play Pisiraandhaiyaar. One among his famous lines is ‘அறிவை விரிவு செய், அகண்டமாக்கு’, ‘Arivai virivu sei, agandamakku’ meaning “Expand knowledge – make it universal”. Named after this great poet, it has been Bharathidasan institute of management's endeavour to expand and universalize knowledge.

Named after the revolutionary poet Bharathidasan, the Bharathidasan University was set up in 1982 as an offshoot of the University of Madras. The motto of the university “We will create a brave new world” has been framed from Bharathidasan's poetic words “புதியதோர் உலகம் செய்வோம்”. The university endeavours to be true to such a vision by creating in the region a brave new world of academic innovation for social change.

== List of poems made into film lyrics ==
- Thamizhukum Amudenru per
- Sanke Muzhangu
- "Thunbam Nergayil" (set in Desh raga by Carnatic musician Dandapani Desikar and used by film composer R. Sudarsanam in Or Iravu in 1951)
- Thesa gnanam
- Neelavana aadaikul
- Valiyor silar
- Muzhumai Nila
- Chithirai
- Pallikudam
- Kalyanam aagatha penae
- Kaatrilellam
- Kandavudal kadal
- Vaanukku nilavu
- Paazhai pona manam
- Vaana mazhai neeye
- Avalum Naanum Amudhum Thamizhum

== Awards and recognitions ==
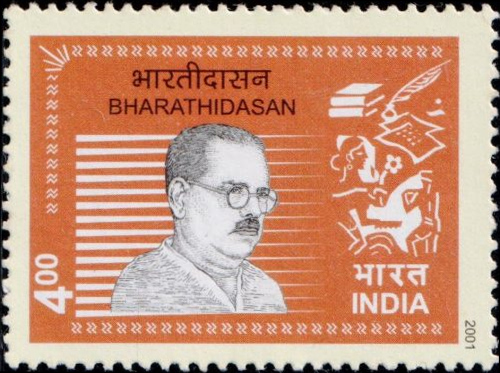
Bharathidasan on a 2001 stamp of India

- Bharathidasan won the Golden Parrot Prize in 1946 for his play Amaithi-Oomai (Peace and Dumbness).
- He was given the Sahitya Academy Award, posthumously in 1970 for his play Pisiranthaiyar.
- On 9 October 2001, a commemorative stamp of Bharathidasan was released by the Postal Department in Chennai.
- He was conferred with the title of "Puratchi Kavingyar" (meaning the "Revolutionary Poet") by Periyar.

== Legacy ==
- Tamil Nadu's state government gives the Bharathidasan Award annually to a Tamil poet.
- The Government of Puducherry union territory has adopted Bharathidasan's song of Invocation to Mother Tamil as the state song of Puducherry.
- A state university named Bharathidasan University was established in Tiruchirappalli.
- Bharathidasan institute of management, one of India's top B-schools, was established in Tiruchirappalli.

== See also ==
- List of Sahitya Akademi Award winners for Tamil
- List of Indian writers
- List of Tamil-language writers
