= T. M. Chidambara Ragunathan =

Indian writer

- Born: 20 October 1923; Tinnelvelly, Madras Presidency, British India (now Tirunelveli, Tamil Nadu, India)
- Died: 31 December 2001 (aged 78); Palayamkottai, Tirunelveli, Tamil Nadu, India
- Occupations: Author, poet, critic and translator
- Writing career
- Pen name: T. M. C. Ragunathan or Tho. Mu. Si. Ragunathan or Tho. Mu. Si.
- Language: Tamil
- Period: 1941–1999
- Genres: Social novels, literary criticism, poetry
- Subject: Literature
- Notable works: Panchum Pasiyum; Bharathi: Kaalamum Karuthum; Ilango adigal yaar?
- Notable awards: Sahitya Akademi Award (1983)
- Movement: Socialist Realist

T. M. Chidambara Ragunathan (20 October 1923 – 31 December 2001), was a Tamil, writer, translator, journalist, and literary critic from Tamil Nadu, India. He is also known as T. M. C. Ragunathan, Tho. Mu. Si. Ragunathan or by his Tamil initials as Tho. Mu. Si.

== Biography ==
Ragunathan was born in Tirunelveli in 1923. His elder brother T. M. Bhaskara Thondaman, a member of the Indian Civil Service was also a noted author. He was a student of and mentored by A. Srinivasa Raghavan. His first short story appeared in Prasanda Vikatan in 1941. He was jailed in 1942 for his participation in the Indian independence movement. He worked as a sub-editor in Dina Mani briefly in 1944 and later joined the literary journal Mullai in 1946. His first novella Puyal was published in 1945. His first noted work was the literary criticism 'Ilakkiya Vimarsanam' (1948). He followed it up with the novel Panchum Pasiyum in 1951. It was translated into Czech and sold 50,000 copies within weeks of publication. The same year he published his first short story collection. During 1954–56 he ran the progressive literary monthly Shanthi. The magazine introduced many young writers to the world including – Daniel Selvaraj, Sundara Ramasami, Jayakanthan and Ki. Rajanarayanan. For the next decade he worked as a free lancer in magazines. In the mid 1960s he joined Soviet Land Publications (Soviet Information Branch), where he edited and translated many Russian works into Tamil. Some of his noted translations include Maxim Gorky's The Mother and Vladimir Mayakovsky's elegy Vladimir Ilyich Lenin. In 1983, he was awarded the Sahitya Akademi Award for Tamil for his literary criticism – Bharathi: Kalamum Karuthum (lit. Bharathi – his times and his ideas). In 1985, he published Ilango Adigal Yaar (lit. Who is Ilango), a socio-historical study on Ilango Adigal. He retired from Soviet Land in 1988. He died in Palayamkottai in 2001.

Ragunathan was a friend and associate of the Tamil writer Pudhumaipithan. After Pudhumaipithan's death in 1948, Ragunathan collected and published many of his works. In 1951, he published a biography of his friend. In 1999 he published Pudumaippithan kathaigal: sila vimarsanangalum vishamangalum (lit. Pudumaippithan's stories—some criticisms and some mischiefs). It was a follow-up to his 1951 biography and a detailed defence of Pudhumaipithan against the allegations of plagiarism levelled by his contemporaries like P. G. Sundararajan. Ragunathan's most productive literary phase was during 1942–62. He belonged to the socialist-realist school of writers and his political orientation was socialist. His ideology is well reflected in his Panchum Pasiyum (lit. Cotton and hunger), which describes the plight of handloom weavers in Tamil Nadu. He also wrote poems using the pseudonym Thiruchirrambala Kavirayar. In his literary career, he produced four short story anthologies, three novels, three poetry collections, two plays and one biography, besides his non-fiction (research and critical) works.

== Awards and recognitions ==
- Sahitya Akademi Award (1983)
- Soviet Land Nehru Award – in 1965 for Thai and in 1970 for Lenin kavithaanjali
- Tamil Annai Prize from Tamil University, Thanjavur.
- Bharathi Award (2001)

== Partial bibliography ==
=== Biography ===
- Pudhumaipithan varalaaru (biography)

=== Literary criticism ===
- Bharati kaalamum karuthum
- Bharatiyum Shelliyum
- Ilakkia vimarsanam
- Gangayum Kaviriyum
- Samudhaya Ilakkiam

=== Literary research ===
- Pudumaippithan kathaigal: sila vimarsanangalum vishamangalum
- Ilango adigal yaar

=== Translations ===
- Thai (Gorky's mother)
- Lenin kavithaanjali (Mayakovsky's elegy Vladimir Ilyich Lenin)

=== Novels ===
- Silai pesitrru
- Panchum pasiyum
- Marudha Pandiyan

=== Short story collections ===
- Serril Malarndha Senthamarai
- Kshanapitham
- Sudarmam
- Ragunathan kadhaigal

=== Poetry collections ===
- Ragunathan kavidhaigal
- Kaviaranga kavidhaigal
- Kaviya parisu
- Tamizhaal elaathaa?

== See also ==
- List of Sahitya Akademi Award winners for Tamil
- List of Indian writers
- List of Tamil-language writers
