= Cre-A Ramakrishnan =

Tamil publisher

S Ramakrishnan, commonly known as Cre-A Ramakrishnan (Note: Tamil: க்ரியா ராமகிருஷ்ணன், romanized: Kriyā Rāmakiruṣṇaṉ) (18 June 1945 – 17 November 2020), was an Indian publisher and editor who founded Cre-A Publishing. (Note: Tamil: க்ரியா பதிப்பகம், romanized: Kriyā patippakam) He is known for making major contributions to Tamil contemporary literature and vocabulary though Cre-A, including the introduction of several editing and translation practices, and for producing one of the most used modern dictionaries of the language.

== Biography ==
S Ramakrishnan was born on 18 June 1945 in Chennai. Although he was born into a Telugu Brahmin family and natively spoke the language, he considered himself Tamil, and was drawn to Tamil literature from his youth. After a stint at Loyola College, Ramakrishnan entered an "informal group... driven by a thirst for books", which included writers such as Gnanakoothan, and published a literary magazine called Ka Sa Da Tha Pa Ra with them in the 1960s. Following some time working for an advertising agency and "being with books" for two years, where he started thinking about trying to increase the quality of Tamil books and make them on-par with English-language publishing, Ramakrishnan started Cre-A Publishers in 1974 to achieve that mission, with the first work published being a compilation of plays by Na Muthuswamy titled Naarkaalikaarar. The name was based on his friend Jayalakshmi, who Ramakrishnan described as "instrumental in introducing me to this field" in an interview; she had originally mentioned the name and pointed out it rhymed with "Jaya" in jest.

Cre-A was initially known for its translations, particularly direct, high-quality ones from French and German for authors such as Franz Kafka and Albert Camus. It also published some earlier works of now-renowned writers such as Ambai, Imayam and Sundara Ramaswamy. It later grew in scope, growing to publish works on "[the] environment, healthcare, agriculture, modern Western philosophy and technology" as well as Tamil translations of Hindi, Bengali and Kannada literature from 1978 onward. Through his experience with publishing, Ramakrishnan decided to fill the need for a contemporary Tamil dictionary, having realized that no such product had been produced yet and concerned about the apparent "lack" of Tamil lexical development, and thus started working on the Cre-A Dictionary of Contemporary Tamil, (Note: Tamil: க்ரியாவின் தற்காலத் தமிழ் அகராதி, romanized: Kriyāviṉ taṟkālat tamiḻ akarāti) which began development in 1985 and was released in 1992. A review in The Journal of Asian Studies of the second edition, published in 2008, stated that it had become "the most reliable, detailed, and useful dictionary of contemporary Tamil" by then. The second edition added new terms, including Sri Lankan regional vocabulary, and new drawings; while the review praised this, it also stated that more regional terms should be added and the dictionary's focus on standard written Tamil limited its potential. He also played pivotal roles in establishing Roja Muthiah Research Library in Chennai, MOZHI public trust and co-founded the Koothu-P-Pattarai avant-garde theatre group with Na Muthuswamy.

During the COVID-19 pandemic in India, Ramakrishnan contracted the disease and was admitted to the Tamil Nadu Government Multi Super Speciality Hospital in 2020. Despite this, he continued to edit the third edition of the dictionary from his hospital bed to meet its November 13 release date. Four days later, Ramakrishnan died from the disease at the age of 75; a number of Tamil political figures, including then Chief Minister Edappadi K. Palaniswami, subsequently issued statements of tribute, and linguist-cum-Indologist David Dean Shulman eulogized him, stating that "he was the living heart of modern Tamil".

== Legacy ==
In November 2021, a book was launched by The Hindu Publishing Group titled Book Culture in Tamil: Essays in Memory of Cre-A Ramakrishnan in remembrance of him.
