= Tamilvanan =

Indian Tamil author and publisher

Tamilvanan was a Tamil language author and publisher based in Chennai. He was the founding editor of the widely influential magazine Kalkandu; it published fiction, articles about state politics and Tamil cinema, and pages of factoids. It also had a vibrant 'Question and Answers' section, in which the editor's idiosyncrasy was promoted. Tamilvanan and his magazine were closely associated with the Dravidian socio-political movement.

Tamilvanan's novels feature the detective hero Shankarlal, who travels the world solving crimes and battling criminals in countries around the world. Improbably, he is instantly recognized and mobbed by fans and admirers everywhere he goes. The novels often contain a good deal of factual information about the settings, which served to educate the Tamil audience about countries to which, at the time, relatively few Indians could obtain visas or afford to travel.

In the books, Shankarlal frequently travels with his wife Indra and his servants, Kathrikai (the nickname means "eggplant", a reference to his fat belly and tuft of hair) and Manickam. The detective wore a black hat and sunglasses whenever pictured, and was famous for drinking great quantities of tea.

Despite all the foreign settings and situations, Tamilvanan's language was pure Tamil language, avoiding common English or Hindi loan words in favor of their Tamil equivalents. Nonetheless, all the hall-marks of a journalistic genius were visible in his work.

Tamilvanan was born Lakshmanan Ramanathan Chettiar. He was regarded as an innovative and progressive journalist whose ideas were often ahead of his time. His journalistic motto was "Courage is the Savior" (in Tamil, "Thunivee Thunai").

In his magazine Kalkandu, he frequently supported factual claims and statistics with references to authoritative publications, including Encyclopædia Britannica and the Guinness Book of World Records, as well as other scholarly works. He also consulted the sources cited in these publications to gather further information and verify details. His distinctive approach to research and journalism earned him a reputation for thoroughness and originality.

A black hat and a pair of black glasses featured in one of the logos of Kalkandu and became closely associated with Tamilvanan. His articles were known for presenting unusual facts and encouraging readers to consider original and thought-provoking ideas.

The publication house (MANIMEKALI PRASURAM) which was started by Tamilvanan is being run by his sons LENA TAMILVANAN and RAVI TAMILVANAN. His elder son Lena Tamilvanan continues to run his publishing business, and is a noted author and editor in his own right. He is also the editor of the weekly Kalkandu and is the sub-editor of the weekly magazine Kumudam.

== Novels/serials ==
1. Marmamanithan
2. Thimingila Theevu
3. Sankarlal Thupparigirar
4. Pathu Per Thediya Pathukodi
5. 153
6. Karugiya Kadiham
7. Orangeu Vanna Car
8. Manidhargal Illadha Theevu
9. Indru Mudhal Success
10. Getti Bommulu Ennum Kolliakaran
