= Na. Parthasarathy =

Indian novelist (1932–1987)

- Born: 18 December 1932; Nathikudi; Ramanathapuram district, Madras Presidency, British India (now in Virudhunagar district Tamil Nadu, India).
- Died: 13 December 1987 (aged 54); Chennai
- Occupations: Novelist, writer,
- Spouse: Sundaravalli
- Children: Narayanan (Son); Poorani,Bharathi,Meera,Nithya (Daughters).
- Writing career
- Language: Tamil
- Subject: Literature
- Notable awards: Sahitya Akademi Award (1971)
- Movement: Syndicate Congress

Na. Parthasarathy (18 December 1932 – 13 December 1987), was a Sahitya Akademi Award winning Tamil writer from Tamil Nadu,India.

== Career ==
In 1971, he was awarded the Sahitya Akademi Award for Tamil for his novel Samudhaya Veedhi. He was also a journalist who worked in Kalki, Dina Mani Kadhir and later ran a magazine called Deepam. He was known as Deepam Parthasarathy due to his magazine. He also published under various pet names like Theeran, Aravindan, Manivannan, Ponmudi, Valavan, Kadalazhagan, Ilampooranan and Sengulam Veerasinga Kavirayar.

In 2007, his works were nationalised by the Government of Tamil Nadu.

== Bibliography ==
=== Novels ===
- Saingala Megangal (சாயங்கால மேகங்கள்)
- Anugraha (அநுக்கிரகா)
- Anicha Malar(அனிச்ச மலர்)
- Aathmavin Ragangal (ஆத்மாவின் ராகங்கள்)
- Rani Mangammal (இராணி மங்கம்மாள்)
- Kapadapuram (கபாடபுரம்)
- Kalithokai Paripaadal Kaatchigal (கலித்தொகை பரிபாடல் காட்சிகள்)
- Katrsuvarkal (கற்சுவர்கள்)
- Kurinji Malar (குறிஞ்சி மலர்)
- Sathiya Vellam (சத்திய வெள்ளம்)
- Samuthaya Veethi (சமுதாய வீதி)
- Sinthanai Medai (சிந்தனை மேடை)
- Sinthanai Valam (சிந்தனைவளம்)
- Tamil Ilakkiya Kathaigal (தமிழ் இலக்கியக் கதைகள்)
- Thiranayvu Selvam (திறனாய்வுச் செல்வம்)
- Thulasi Madam (துளசி மாடம்)
- Na. Parthasarathy - Short Stories (நாபார்த்தசாரதி-சிறுகதைகள்)
- Nisaptha Sangeetham (நிசப்த சங்கீதம்)
- Nithilavalli (நித்திலவல்லி)
- Nenjakkanal (நெஞ்சக்கனல்)
- Nettrikkan (நெற்றிக்கண்)
- Pazanthamizhar Kattada Kalaiyum Nagaramaipum (பழந்தமிழர் கட்டடக் கலையும் நகரமைப்பும்)
- Pandimadevi (பாண்டிமாதேவி)
- Pirantha Mann (பிறந்த மண்)
- Putha Nyayiru (புத்த ஞாயிறு)
- Puthiya Paarvai (புதிய பார்வை)
- Pumiyin Punnagai (பூமியின் புன்னகை)
- Poi Mugangal (பொய்முகங்கள்)
- Ponvilangu (பொன்விலங்கு)
- Manipallavam (Part 1 to 5) (மணிபல்லவம் பகுதி 1 முதல் பகுதி 5)
- Mul Veligal (முள்வேலிகள்)
- Moola Kanal (மூலக்கனல்)
- Moorarai Venran (மூவரை வென்றான்)
- Mozhiyin Vazhiye (மொழியின் வழியே)
- Vanchima Nagaram (வஞ்சிமா நகரம்)
- Vetri Muzhakkam (வெற்றி முழக்கம்)
- Sulaba (சுலபா)
- Deepam (தீபம்)

=== Philosophy ===
- Mahabharatham: Arathin Kural (மகாபாரதம் அறத்தின் குரல்)

=== Short Story ===
- Purananootru Sirukathaigal 1 & 2 (புறநானூற்றுச் சிறுகதைகள் 1 & 2)

=== Translated Works ===
- Aatmana Aalap (Gujarati)
- Jindagina Ranga Aneka (Gujarathi)
- Swapn-surakhi (Gujarati) - (Kurinjimalar)
- Thithali (Butterfly)
- Tulsi Chaura
- Yeh Gali Bikau Nahin

== Awards ==
- Kalaimamani Award - 1971
- Tamil Development Department Award
- Raja Sir Annamalai Literary Award

== See also ==
- List of Sahitya Akademi Award winners for Tamil
- List of Indian writers
- List of Tamil-language writers
