= Prapanchan =

Indian writer (1945–2018)

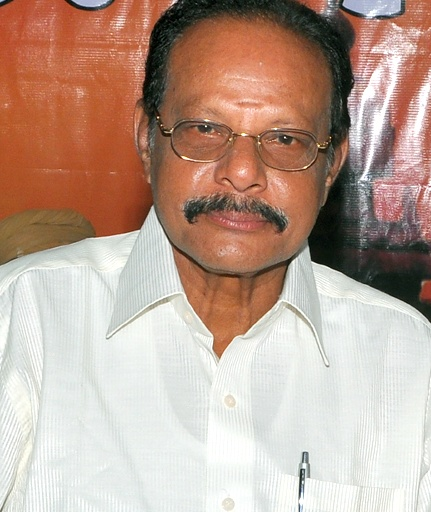
- Born: S. Vaidyalingam; 27 April 1945; Pondicherry, French India (now Puducherry, India)
- Died: 21 December 2018 (aged 73); Puducherry, India
- Education: M.A. Tamil
- Occupations: writer and critic
- Spouse: Pramila Rani
- Children: Gawdaman, Gowrisankar, Sathish
- Writing career
- Pen name: Prabanjan
- Language: Tamil, French, English
- Notable awards: Sahitya Akademi Award (1995)

Prapanchan, is the pseudonym of S. Vaidyalingam (Tamil: சாரங்கபாணி வைத்தியலிங்கம்; 27 April 1945 – 21 December 2018) a Tamil, writer and critic from Puducherry, India.

== Biography ==
Prapanchan was born in Pondicherry and did his schooling in Petit Seminaire Higher Secondary School, Puducherry. His birth name was Vaidyalingam. His father ran a toddy shop. He attended the Karandhai College and graduated as a Tamil Vidwan. He started his career as a Tamil teacher in Thanjavur. He also worked as a journalist in Kumudam, Ananda Vikatan and Kungumam. In 1961, he published his first short story Enna ulagamada in the magazine Bharani. He was influenced by the Self-Respect Movement. He had published 46 books. In 1995, he was awarded the Sahitya Akademi Award for Tamil for his historical novel Vaanam Vasappadum (lit. The Sky will be ours) set in the times of Ananda Ranga Pillai. His works have been translated into Hindi, Telugu, Kannada, German, French, English and Swedish. His play Muttai is part of the curriculum in Delhi University and his short story collection Netrru Manidhargal is a textbook in many colleges. He was married to Pramila Rani and they have three sons. He was living in Chennai and Pondicherry. He was diagnosed with lung cancer (Squamous cell carcinoma), for which he underwent palliative chemotherapy from Manakula Vinayagar Medical College & Hospital under the department of pulmonary medicine and oncology. On 21 December 2018 he died of respiratory failure and tumor metastasis.

== Partial bibliography ==
=== Novels ===
- Vaanam vasappadum
- Mahanadhi
- Manudam vellum
- Sandhya
- Kagidha Manidhargal
- Kaneeral Kappom
- Penmai velga
- Padhavi
- Erodu Thamizhar uyirodu

=== Novellas ===
- Aangalum Pengalum

=== Short story collections ===
- Nerru Manidhargal
- Vittu Viduthalayagi
- Iruttin Vaasal
- Oru ooril irandu manidhargal
- Appavin veshti
- Mari engira aatukutti

=== Plays ===
- Muttai
- Akalya

== Awards and recognitions ==
- Sahitya Akademi Award in Tamil, 1996 for Vaanam vasappadum
- Bharatiya Bhasha Parishad Award
- Coimbatore Kasturi Rangammal Award for Mahanadhi
- Ilakkiya Chinthanai Award for Manudam vellum
- Adithanar award for Sandhya
- Award for Non-Fiction from The Tamil Literary Garden, Toronto

== See also ==
- List of Sahitya Akademi Award winners for Tamil
- List of Indian writers
- List of Tamil-language writers
