= Ashokamitran =

Indian writer

Jagadisa Thyagarajan
- அசோகமித்திரன்
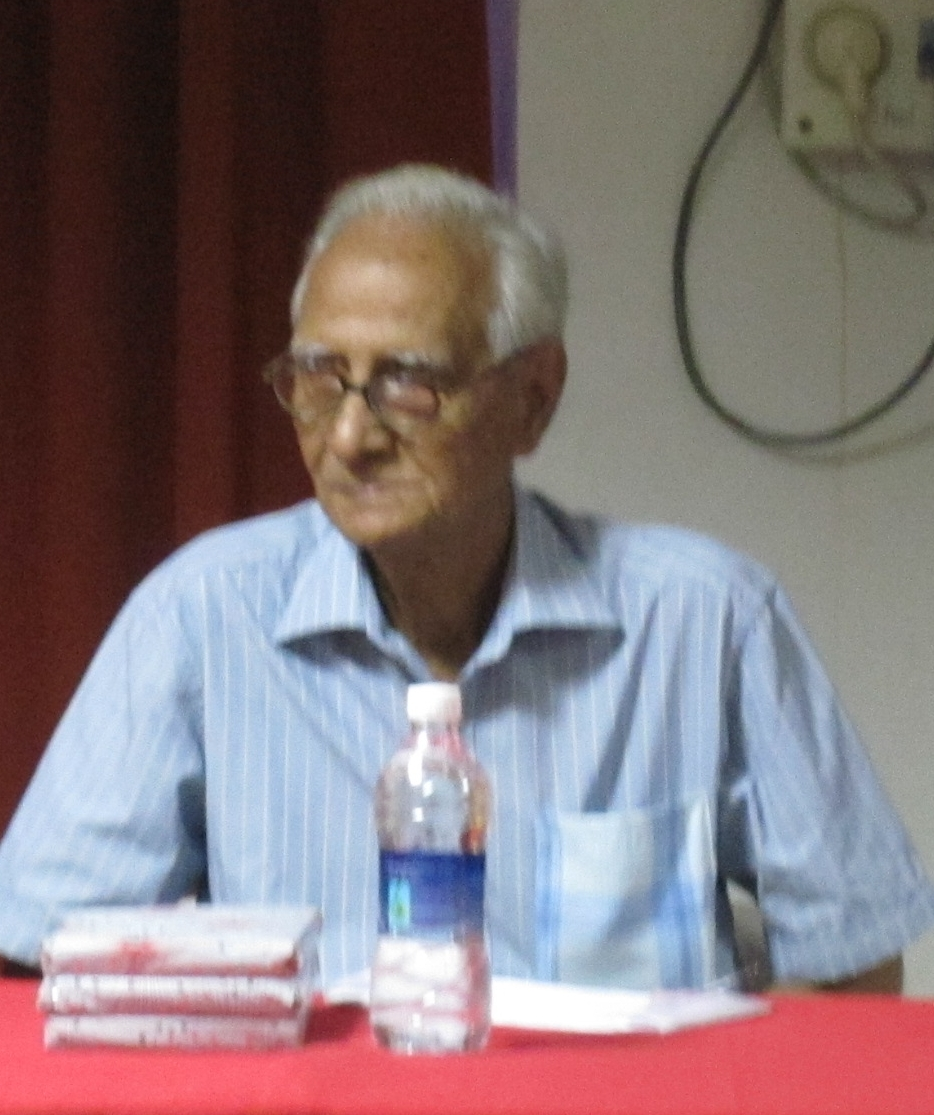
- Born: Thyagarajan; 22 September 1931; Secunderabad, Madras Presidency, British India (now Hyderabad district, Telangana, India)
- Died: 23 March 2017 (aged 85); Chennai, Tamil Nadu
- Writing career
- Pen name: Ashokamithran
- Language: Tamil
- Genres: Short Story, Novel, Novella, Translation
- Notable awards: Sahitya Akademi Award (1996)

Ashokamitran (22 September 1931 – 23 March 2017) was the pen name of Jagadisa Thyagarajan, a prolific Indian writer regarded as one of the most influential figures in post-independent Tamil literature. He began his prolific literary career with the prize-winning play "Anbin Parisu" and went on to author more than two hundred short stories, and a dozen novellas and novels. A distinguished essayist and critic, he was the editor of a famous Tamil literary journal "Kanaiyaazhi". He has written over 200 short stories, nine novels, and some 15 novellas besides other prose writings. Most of his works have also been translated into English and other Indian languages, including Hindi, Malayalam, and Telugu.

== Life ==
Born in Secunderabad in 1931, Ashokamitran spent the first 20 years of his life there. His real name was Jagadisa Thyagarajan. He moved to Chennai in 1952 after the death of his father, following an invitation from his father's friend, the film director S.S.Vasan to come work at Vasan's Gemini Studios. He worked for more than a decade at the Gemini Studios. While working there he often acted as an "unofficial scribe" (in his own words) for people working in the film industry, and said that his efforts consisted of "writing most heart rending appeals for loans and salary advances." He also began writing about his experiences working in the film industry in a set of columns for the Illustrated Weekly of India; these columns later became his book, My Years with Boss (sometimes translated as Fourteen Years with Boss). The 'boss' referred to was S.S. Vasan, the owner of Gemini Studios.

His experiences here and his interaction with people from the Tamil filmdom later took the form of his book "My Years with Boss". In 1966, he left his work in the film industry, and has since said that he felt he "should not continue with a system which had built-in inequities."

It was from 1966 that he became a full-time writer and he took up the pseudonym of "Ashokamitran". In 1973 he was invited and took part in the International Writing Program at the University of Iowa, United States. In the 1980s most of his works were translated into English and he and his works became well-known all over India. Some of his works were translated into other European languages and most Indian languages as well.

Ashokamitran died on 23 March 2017 at the age of 85. He was survived by his wife and three sons.

== Writing style ==
His works are characterized by simplicity and clarity of thought and drew from his professional and personal experiences. His novel Karainta nizhalkal (Star-Crossed), for instance, drew from his experiences working in public relations in the film industry at Gemini Studios. He has cited a number of writers as influencing his style, including Tamil writers B.R. Rajam Iyer, Subramania Bharti, Kothamangalam Subbu and K N Subramaniam. Most of his stories revolve around the life of middle class people. Other than Karaintha nizhalkal; Thanneer, Otran, and Pathinetaavathu atchakodu are his masterpieces. He was first to set his story in a non-Tamil milieu and “pull it off”, said Venkatachalapathy. His essays were no pushovers either, he said, adding that Ashokamitran had a flat style of writing. “He was also a voracious reader, especially of American writings,” he said. “Another standout quality was the wry humor. Today, with over 200 short stories, nine novels, and several non-fiction essays and translations, Ashokamitran is seen as a major contributor to the modern history of Tamil literature. His nonlinear and non-preachy creative works are critically seen for their subdued aesthetics and absence of extravaganza.

== Legacy ==
Ashokamitran's life and work have been the subject of three documentary films, made by Amshan Kumar, Kandasamy, and Gnani. His novel Thanneer is being adapted for film by the director, Vasanth.

== Honours and awards ==
Ashokamitran was given many awards and honors. Some of them are:

- The K.K. Birla Fellowship to do a study in comparative Indian literature.
- 1973-74: The University of Iowa Creative Writing Fellowship.
- 1992: Lily Memorial Award.
- 1993: Ramkrishna Jaidayal Harmony Award by the Dalmia Trust for promoting religious harmony.
- 1996: Akshara Award.
- 1996: Sahitya Akademi Award for Appavin Snegidhar, a collection of short stories.
- January 2007: The MGR Award.
- May 2012: NTR National Literary Award by NTR Vignan Trust.
- 10 February 2013: The inaugural Kaa Na Su award at a function in Chennai.
- 30 March 2013: National award instituted by the Bharatiya Bhasha Parishad at Kolkata.

== Works ==
=== Novels ===
- Thanneer: One of the most acclaimed work of Ashokamitran (along with Karainta Nilalkal, Padhinettavadhu Atchakodu and Otran). The novel revolves around a woman named Jamuna navigating her mundane life in then water scarce Madras region.
- Manasarovar
- Padhinettavadhu Atchakodu (1977) - This novel is widely regarded as the masterpiece of Ashokamitran. The novel is set in the Nizam Kingdom of Secundrabad in the period of 1947-48. It is a microhistorical and semi-auto biographical work describing the unfolding of the conflict of The Nizam kingdom with the newly independent Indian Union from a common man's perspective. Widely regarded as one of the greatest modern historical novels in Tamil, it has been selected under the National Book Trust's "Aadhan Pradhan" scheme to be translated into all Indian languages.
- My Years with Boss: A memoir of his experience in Gemini Studios. He recounts his experience in the Gemini Studios as a Public Relations incharge at Gemini. The novel was originally published in English and is an important English work of Ashokamitran.
- Karainta Nilalkal (translated to English as Star Crossed, by V. Ramnarayan.: It is the first novel of Ashokamitran which later cemented him as an important writer in the Indian literary landscape. It has been recounted many times by very famous Tamil writers that he refused to remove a chapter from the novel which was widely assumed to be inspired from a famous Tamil magazine editor. The chapter was set as a conversation between a wealthy powerful father and his careless son. It has been said that his refusal to remove the chapter affected him both financially and professionally.
- Otran: It is an autofictional work based on his experiences at the University of Iowa's International Writing Program in 1973. An English translation of the work was done by N. Kalyan Raman.
- Indru: A novel exploring the state of India during the Emergency period in India in the eighties.
- India 1944-48: A compiled version of his two novels capturing the events in India few years before and after independence.
- Aagayathamarai
- Yudhangalukku Idaiyil: The last novel written by Ashokamitran based on his family.

=== Short stories ===
- Appavin Snegidhar. In 1995, he won the Sahitya Akademi Award for this collection of short stories.
- Still Bleeding from the Wound (a collection of stories translated to English by N. Kalyan Raman).
- Ammavukku oru naal

== See also ==
- List of Sahitya Akademi Award winners for Tamil
- List of Indian writers
- List of Tamil-language writers
