= Vallikannan =

Tamil writer and journalist (1920 - 2006)

- Born: Rajavallipuram S. Krishnasamy; 12 November 1920; Rajavallipuram, Tinnevely District, Madras Presidency, British India (now Tirunelveli district, Tamil Nadu, India)
- Died: 9 November 2006 (aged 85); Chennai, Tamil Nadu, India
- Occupations: Journalist, writer, scholar
- Writing career
- Pen name: Vallikannan
- Language: Tamil
- Subject: Literature
- Notable awards: Sahitya Akademi Award (1978)

Rajavallipuram Subramanian Krishnasamy (Tamil: ரா.சு. கிருஷ்ணசாமி; 12 November 1920 – 9 November 2006), known by his pen name Vallikannan, was a Tamil writer, journalist, critic, and translator from Tamil Nadu, India.

== Biography ==
Krishnasamy was born in Rajavallipuram near Tirunelveli. He started writing at a very young age and had published twenty-five books by the time he was 30. He worked for magazines like Cinema Ulagam, Navasakthi, Grama Oozhiyan and Hanuman. He also wrote under the pseudonyms "Naiyandi Bharathi" and "Koranathan". He wrote a total of 75 books in his life - novels, novellas, poetry collections, plays and essay anthologies.

In 1978, he was awarded the Sahitya Akademi Award for Tamil for his critical work on modern Tamil poetry Pudukavithaiyin Thottramum Valarchiyum (lit. The birth and growth of Modern Tamil Poetry). He died in 2006.

== Books ==
- Bharathidasanin uvamai nayam (1946)
- Pudhukavidhayin Thorramum Valarchiyum (1977)
- Saraswathi Kalam (1986)
- Bharathikkuppin Tamil Urai Nadai (1981)
- Thamizhil Siru Pathinikkaigal

== See also ==
- List of Sahitya Akademi Award winners for Tamil
- List of Indian writers
- List of Tamil-language writers
