= Thoppil Mohamed Meeran =

Tamil writer

- Born: Thoppil Mohamed Meeran; 26 September 1944; Thengapattanam, Travancore, British India,(now in Kanyakumari district, Tamil Nadu, India).
- Died: 10 May 2019 (aged 74); Tirunelveli, Tamil Nadu, India
- Spouse: Mrs.Jaleela Meeran
- Children: Mr.Shameem Ahamed, Mr.Mirzad Ahamed
- Writing career
- Language: Tamil, Malayalam
- Genres: Short Story, Novel, Novella, Translation
- Notable awards: Sahitya Akademi Award (1997)

Thoppil Mohamed Meeran (26 September 1944 – 10 May 2019)was a Sahitya Akademi Award winning Tamil writer, translator from Tamil Nadu.

== Literary career ==
Meeran was awarded the highest Indian Government award for Literature, Sahitya Akademi Award in 1997 for his novel Saivu Narkali (The Reclining Chair). He also received the Tamil Nadu Kalai Ilakkiya Perumantam Award, the Ilakkiya Chintanai Award, and the T N Govt. Award. He published six novels and seven short story collections.

== Personal life ==
Mohamed Meeran was born in Thengapattanam, Travancore, British India,(now in Kanyakumari district, Tamil Nadu, India). He was also addressed as Thoppil Meeran by his friends and family. His father's name is Mohammed Abdul Khader (முஹம்மது அப்துல் காதர் ) and his mother's name is Beevi Paatha Kannu (பீவி பாத்த கண்ணு ). He was married to Jaleela and had two children, Shameem Ahamed and Mirzad Ahamed. He was one of the sons of the famous M.O.M Family. On 10 May 2019 he died due to the ill health at Tirunelveli.

== Works ==
=== Novels ===
- Oru Kadalora Kiramathin Kathai (1988, The Story of Sea Side Village)
- Turaimugam (1991, Harbour)
- Koonan Thoppu (1993, The Grove of a Hunchback)
- Saivu Narkkali (1995, The Reclining Chair)
- Anju vannam theru (2011, "Five Colours street")
- kudiyetram (2017, Emigration)

=== Short story collections ===
- Anbuku Muthumai Illai
- Thankarasu(1995)
- Anathasainam Colony
- Oru kutty thevin varipadam
- Thoppil mohammed meeran kathaigal
- Oru maaamaramum konjam paravaigalum
- Maranathin meethu urulum sakkaram

=== Anthology ===
- varekalin pechu

=== Translations ===
- Husainul jamal (moin kutty vaither)
- Theivathin kanne (NP Mohammed)
- vaikom muhammad basheer valkai varalaru (mona graph) (MN karassery)
- Thirukottiyur kurunavel (U.A Kader)
- Meesan karkalin kaval (Pk Parakadavu)

== Awards ==
- Tamil Nadu Kalai Ilakkiya Perumantam (1992)
- Ilakkiya Chintanai
- Lilly Devasigamani
- T N Govt. Award
- Amuthan adigal Literary award
- TN Murpokku Ezhuthalar Sangam
- Sahitya Akademi Award (1997)
- SRM University Tamil Academy Award 'Pudumaipiththan Creative Literature Award for the best small stories Novels and Drama (2012)'
