= List of Iyengars =

Iyengars are an ethnoreligious group with origins in the Indian states of Tamil Nadu and Karnataka.

== Actors ==
- Charuhasan (b. 1931) - Indian actor
- Sandhya (1924 - 1971) - Indian actress and Jayalalithaa's mother
- Vasundhara Das (b. 1977) – Indian actress and singer
- Akshara Haasan (b. 1991) - Indian actress
- Kamal Haasan (b. 1954) Indian actor
- Shruti Haasan (b. 1986) - Indian actress
- Anu Hasan (b. 1970) - Indian actress and talk show host
- Amrutha Iyengar (b. 1996) - Indian actress
- Kalyan Kumar(1928-1999)- Indian actor
- R. Madhavan (b. 1970)- Indian actor
- Y. G. Mahendran (b.1950)-Tamil film actor
- Hema Malini (b. 1948) – Indian actress and Bharathnatyam exponent
- Suhasini Maniratnam (b. 1961) - Indian actress
- T. G. Raghavachari - Filmmaker
- Major Sundarrajan (b.1931)-Tamil film actor
- Vyjayanthimala (b. 1936) - Indian actress

== Politicians and bureaucrats ==
- M. A. Ayyangar (1891 - 1978) - 1st Deputy Speaker of the Lok Sabha, 2nd Speaker of the Lok Sabha, 5th Governor of Bihar
- N. Gopalaswami Ayyangar - 2nd Minister of Defence
- N. Gopalaswami, 10th Chief Election Commissioner of India
- H. V. R. Iengar - 6th Governor of the Reserve Bank of India
- J. Jayalalithaa (1948 - 2016) – Indian actress and politician, former Chief Minister of Tamil Nadu
- T. T. Krishnamachari - 4th Minister of Finance
- E. S. L. Narasimhan - 1st Governor of Telangana
- K. Parasaran - 6th Attorney-General for India
- Mohan Parasaran - 22nd Solicitor General of India
- Gopalaswami Parthasarathy (diplomat) - 7th Permanent Representative of India to the United Nations
- C. Rajagopalachari - The last governor general of India & Chief Minister of Madras
- Raghuram Rajan - 23rd Governor of the Reserve Bank of India
- C. Rangarajan - 19th Governor of the Reserve Bank of India
- C. V. Rungacharlu, the 14th diwan of Mysore
- K. Santhanam, 1st Minister of Railways (Minister of State)
- Nirmala Sitharaman - Current Finance Minister of India, Bharatiya Janata party.
- Madhavachari Srinivasan - Judge of Supreme Court of India
- Srinivas Varadachariar - 1st Indian Chief Justice of Federal Court of India
- C. Vijayaraghavachariar – President, Indian National Congress.

== Musicians ==
- Arjun Ayyangar - American Classical Pianist
- Ariyakudi Ramanuja Iyengar - Indian Carnatic vocalist and Sangeet Natak Akademi Award and Padma Bhushan recipient
- Doreswamy Iyengar - Indian Carnatic Vainika
- Narayan Iyengar - Gottuvadhyam Musician
- Poochi Srinivasa Iyengar
- T. M. Krishna - Indian Carnatic vocalist
- P. T. Narasimhachar - Padma Shri Awardee, Playwright and Kannada Navodaya poet
- Chitravina Narasimhan - Gottuvadhyam Musician
- Latha Rajinikanth - Film producer and playback singer
- Anirudh Ravichander - Film music composer
- N. Ravikiran - Gottuvadhyam Musician and Proposer of Melharmony
- T. N. Seshagopalan - Harikatha Exponent
- Tiger Varadachariar - Indian Carnatic Vocalist
- Vedavalli - Sangita Kala Nidhi

== Scholars and academics ==
- T. R. Govindachari - natural product chemist known for studies on the synthesis of isoquinolines and phenanthridines and Shanti Swarup Bhatnagar Prize for Science and Technology Awardee
- B. K. S. Iyengar (1918 - 2014) - Founder of Iyengar Yoga
- C. N. S. Iyengar - Mathematician, Founder of the department of mathematics at Karnatak University Dharwad
- Sujatha Rangarajan - screenwriter, novelist, engineer
- Gorur Ramaswamy Iyengar - Kannada poet and author
- K. R. Srinivasa Iyengar (1908–1999) - Indian writer in English, former vice-chancellor of Andhra University and winner of the Sahitya Akademi Award
- Masti Venkatesha Iyengar - Jnanapith Awardee and famous Kannada poet and author
- P. K. Iyengar - Indian nuclear physicist and former director of Bhabha Atomic Research Centre and chairman of Atomic Energy Commission of India
- Tirumalai Krishnamacharya (1888 - 1989) - Yoga teacher, often referred to as the "Father of modern Yoga"
- M. S. Narasimhan - Padma Bhushan, Ordre national du Mérite, King Faisal International Prize for Science Awardee. Pioneer in the study of moduli spaces of holomorphic vector bundles on projective varieties
- P. T. Narasimhan pioneer of computational chemistry in India and a professor at the IIT Kanpur
- Shobhana Narasimhan - Computational Nano scientist and Indian Academy of Sciences Fellow
- Indira Parthasarathy (b 1930) - writer, playwright, scholar
- K. R. Parthasarathy - TWAS Prize in Mathematics Awardee and pioneer of quantum stochastic calculus
- M. S. Raghunathan - Director of National Centre for Mathematics, IIT Bombay
- Kavita Ramanan - Guggenheim Fellowship Awardee and probability theorist
- S. Ramanan - Indian Mathematician and TWAS Prize in Mathematics and Shanti Swarup Bhatnagar Prize for Science and Technology Awardee
- Srinivasa Ramanujan (1887 - 1920) - mathematician who made significant contributions to mathematical analysis, infinite series, number theory, and continued fractions
- C. S. Seshadri - Founder of Chennai Mathematical Institute
- Krishna Srinivas, poet, founder of World Poetry Society and World Congress of Poets.
- Govindan Sundararajan - Indian American Mathematician
- Raghavan Varadarajan - Indian biophysicist and a professor at the Indian Institute of Science
- Veeravalli S. Varadarajan - Onsager Medal Awardee and Professor of Mathematics at University of California, Los Angeles
- S. R. Srinivasa Varadhan - Padma Vibhushan, Abel Prize and Birkhoff Prize awardee known for his contributions to probability theory. 7th Director of Courant Institute of Mathematical Sciences
- Usha Vijayaraghavan - Indian microbiologist

== Sportspersons ==
- Krishnamachari Srikkanth - Indian cricketer
- Srinivasaraghavan Venkataraghavan - Indian cricket captain and international umpire
