= K.A. Gunasekaran =

Indian Tamil Playwright

11-th Director, International Institute of Tamil Studies
- In office 2008 - 2011
- Preceded by: M. Rajendran (2006-07); Sean Laurence (acting- 2008)
- Succeeded by: G. Vijayaraghavan (2012-21)

Personal details
- Born: 12 May 1955 Marandai,Ramanathapuram district, Madras State (now Sivaganga District, Tamil Nadu), India
- Died: 17 January 2016 (aged 60) Puducherry, UT of Puducherry, India
- Education: Dr. Zakir Husain College, Sivagangai * Thiagarajar College, Madurai * Madurai Kamaraj University
- Occupation: Writer

K.A. Gunasekaran (1963 – 18 January 2016) was an Indian Dalit folklorist, theatre personality, and the first Dalit playwright in Tamil Nadu. He made significant contributions to the field of Tamil literature, theatre, and folklore, addressing the issues faced by marginalized communities, including Dalits, tribal people, transgender people, and other backward classes.

Born in a poor Dalit family in Elayankudi, he began writing small poems and plays infused with Marxian ideology.

== Career ==
Gunasekaran's groundbreaking play, "Bali Adugal" (Sacrificial Goat), is considered a precursor to the emergence of Dalit theatre in Tamil Nadu. He went on to practice a distinctive form of theatre known as Odukkapattor Arangam or Theatre of the Oppressed. His works addressed the struggles faced by disadvantaged sections of society, challenging the hegemonic forces exploiting individuals based on caste and gender. His rebellious song "Manusangada Naanga Manusangada," written by poet Inkulab and powerfully sung by Gunasekaran, became an anthem for the Dalit Movement in the 1990s.

He served as the dean of the School of Performing Arts at Pondicherry University and the director of the International Institute of Tamil Studies. Gunasekaran was associated with the Progressive Writers’ Movement and received recognition for his extensive research on urban folklore.

== Notable works ==
- Sathya Sothanai (Experiments with Truth, 1988)
- Pavalakkodi Alathu Kudumba Valakku (Family Dispute, 2001)
- Mazhi
- Maatram
- Varaivu Kadavuthal
- Kanthan Valli

== Awards ==
- 2006: Received title of Kalaimamani Award by the Government of Tamil Nadu, which is the highest state honour in the field of Arts
- Received the Dalit Isai Kurisil Award from the Tamil Association of Canada.

== Death ==
K.A. Gunasekaran died on 16 January 2016 at his residence in Puducherry after a prolonged illness due to kidney failure. He is survived by his wife and two children.
