= Budaloor Krishnamurthy Shastri =

Indian musician

Budaloor Krishnamurti Shastri (1894–1978) was an Indian gottuvadhyam player.

== Early life ==
Shastri was born in Andanallur in South India, He first training in music came from his father Seturama Shastri. He continued his training under the musicians Konerirajapuram Vaidyanatha Ayyar and Harikesanallur Muthaiah Bhagavatar.

== Career ==
Shastri's turning point for the Gottuvadhyam came from Gottuvadhyam Narayana Iyengar, a legendary Gottuvadhyam player of that time. After that, he studied under Narayana Iyengar who was 10 years his junior.

Shastri contributed to the popularity of his instrument and is considered an inspiration for Chitravina Narasimhan, Gayatri Kassebaum and N. Ravikiran.

== Death ==
Shastri died in 1978 at the age of 84.
