= M. Rajendran =

Indian essayist (born 1951)

- ம. இராசேந்திரன்
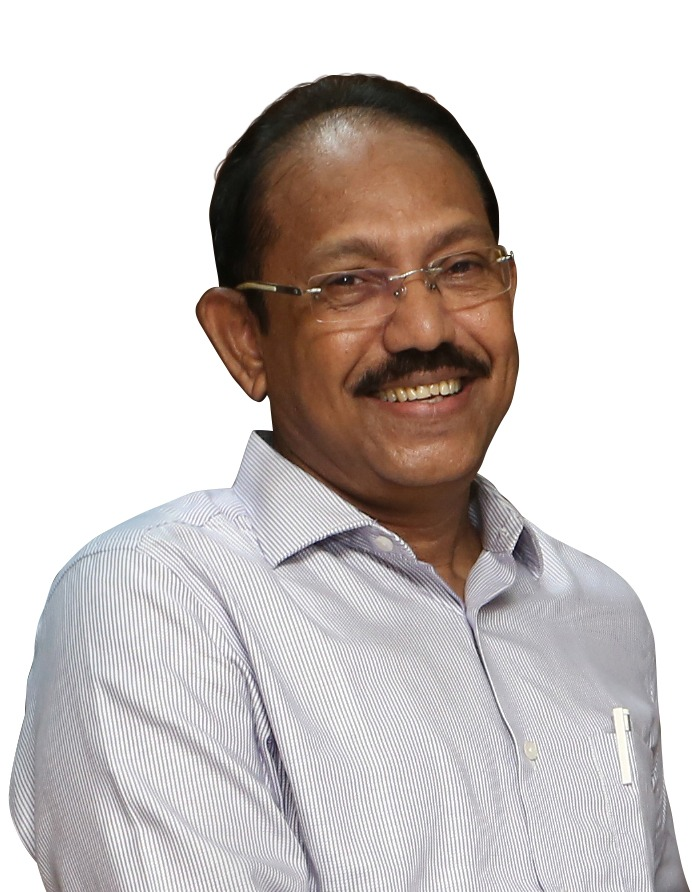

9th Vice-Chancellor, Tamil University, Thanjavur
- In office 19 சூன் 2008 - 18 சூன் 2011
- Chancellor: Surjit Singh Barnala (2004-11)
- Preceded by: C. Subramaniam
- Succeeded by: M. Thirumalai

9th Director, International Institute of Tamil Studies
- In office June 2006 – December 2007
- Preceded by: S. Krishnamoorthy
- Succeeded by: Sean Laurence (acting- 2008); K.A. Gunasekaran (2008-11)

Personal details
- Born: 3 March 1951 (age 75) Eda Annavasal, Tanjore District, Madras State (now Tiruvarur District, Tamil Nadu), India
- Spouse: Mythili
- Children: Thendral (daughter); Ezhil (daughter)
- Parent(s): Gnanambal (mother); Mahadevan(தந்தை)
- Education: University of Madras

Mahadevan Rajendran is an Indian essayist, who served as Vice-Chancellor of Tamil University, Thanjavur, in Tamil Nadu, India. He is a Tamil scholar, writer and publisher of Kanaiyazhi literary magazine in Tamil., He was the coordinator of academic committee, World Classical Tamil Conference 2010. He chaired the High Level Committee to amend the Tamil Nadu Public Library Act and Tamil Nadu Public Library Rules, which was constituted by the Government of Tamil Nadu in January 2022. Kalingar Mu. Karunanidhi Classic Tamil Award, Muthamilkavalar Ki.Aa.Be. Vishwanatham Award has been given to him.

== Birth ==
M. Rajendran was born as a first son to classical musician Mahadevan and Gnanammal on 3 March 3, 1951, at Eda Annavasal, the hamlet of Itdangankottai Keelaiyur alais Eda Keelaiyur in Thiruvarur district of Tamil Nadu state in India; but, his native village is Kudavasal,

== Education ==
Since the father of Rajendran died when Rajendran was one year old, he completed his schooling with the support of his maternal uncle. Mr. Su. Natesan.

- Studied primary education (grades 1–5) at the Panchayat Union Primary School, Eda Annavasal.
- Studied upper primary education (classes 6–8) and secondary education (classes 9-11) at Government High School, Eda Melaiyur.
- Studied at Rajah's College of Tamil Studies and Music, Thiruvaiyaru and obtained Pulavar (Tamil Scholar) degree, while Mr. Gopaliyar was his teacher and principal.
- Studied M.A. (Tamil) at Pachaiyappa’s College, Chennai.
- Awarded Master of Philosophy by Madras University in the year of 1979 against his research on "Ra.See.'s Novels – A Study" under the guidance of Professor Dr. N. Jeyaprakasam at Pachaiyappa’s College in Chennai.
- Awarded Doctor of Philosophy in 1984, for his research on First Surveyor General of India Colin Mackenzie's (1754–1821) collection of manuscripts as "Mackenzie's Tamil Manuscripts'under the guidance of Professor Dr. N. Sanjeevi at Department of Tamil, Madras University.

== Profession ==
Rajendran served in Government of Tamil Nadu as

- President, Tamil Development Academy, Chennai.
- Chairman, Tamil Nadu Public Library Act and Rules Amendment – High Level Committee 2022 from 31-01-2022 to 30-07-2022
- Vice-Chancellor, Tamil University, Thanjavur, between 2008 June 19 and 2011 June 18,
- Coordinator of the academic committee, World Classical Tamil Conference between 2009 and 2010
- Director (Honorary), International School of Dravidian Linguistics, Trivandrum between 2009 and 2011
- Director (in charge), International Institute of Tamil Studies, between 2006 June and 2008 June
- Director (in charge), Tamil Etymological Dictionary Project during 2008
- Special Officer (in charge), Kural Peedam – Tamil Nadu between 2001 and 2003
- Director, Department of Tamil Development between 1999 April 1 and 2008 June 17
- Director, Department of Translation between 1996 and 1999
- Deputy Director, Department of Translation between 1993 and 1996
- Special Officer for Research, International Institute of Tamil Studies – Two Years
- Lecturer and Special Research Fellow, Tamil University, Thanjavur between 1986 and 1989
- Assistant Professor of Tamil, Pachaiyappa's College (Evening), Chennai during 1980–81
- Tami Pandit (Tamil Scholar), Government Oriental Manuscripts Library, Chennai between 1974 and 1986.

== Member of Committees ==
Rajendran was appointed by the Government of Tamil Nadu to the following expert committees:

- Member, Madurai Kamaraj University vice-chancellor search committee,
- Member, Tamil Nadu Open University Vice Chancellor Search Committee 2022
- Member, Committee for Dravida Kalanchiam

== Editor ==
Dr. M. Rajendran edited the following publications:

- Translation of Sangam Literature in Hindi
- Proceedings of the World Classical Tamil Conference, 2010 (10 Volunres)
- Journal of Tamil Studies (4 volumes from June 2006 to December 2007), published by International Institute of Tamil Studies, Chennai

== Awards ==
The Government of Tamil Nadu has given him the following awards to recognize his work in Tamil:

- Kalaingar Mu. Karunanidhi Classical Tamil Award 2020; Central Institute of Classical Tamil Studies, Chennai.
- K. A. P. Vishwanatham Award 2021; Department of Tamil Development, Government of Tamil Nadu, Chennai

== Author of ==
Dr. M. Rajendran authored the following books

W.No	Title	Type	Year of publication	Publisher	Remarks
01	Andhi Pozhudhil– At the Sunset (அந்திப்பொழுதில்)	A Collection of Short Stories in Tamil	1990	Tamil Puthakalaym, Chennai	-
02	Vidigira Velayil-At the daybreak (விடிகிற வேளையில்)	A Collection of Short Stories in Tamil	1992	Kurinjippadi	-
03	Kuttravaaligal- Criminals (குற்றவாளிகள்)	A Collection of Novels in Tamil	1995	Dasara Trust, Chennai	-
04	Valarppu- Upbringing (வளர்ப்பு )	A Collection of Short Stories in Tamil	1996	Rudhra Publication, Thanjavur	-
05	Collin Mackenzie Varalarum Suvadikalum – Collin Mackenzie: History and Manuscripts (காலின் மெக்கன்சி வரலாறும் சுவடிகளும்)	Research	2002	Kanayazhi, Chennai	PhD Thesis
06	Nindra Sol– Lingering Word (நின்றசொல் )	A Collection of Essays in Tamil	2003	Kanaiyazhi Publication, Chennai	-
07	Mackenzie Suvadikalil Thamizhaga Pazhankudi Makkal – Tamil Tribes in Mackenzie Manuscripts (மெக்கன்சி சுவடிகளில் தமிழகப் பழங்குடி மக்கள்)	Research	2003	Kanaiyazhi Publication, Chennai	-
08	Omanadhi (ஓமநதி)	A Collection of Short Stories in Tamil	2004	Kavitha Publication, Chennai	-
09	Pazhaverkadu Varalaru 1816il: Mackenzie Suvadikalil Pathippaiyu -Pazhaverkadu in 1816: Editorial Research on Mackenzie's Manuscripts (பழவேற்காடு வரலாறு 1816: மெக்கன்சியின் சுவடி பதிப்பாய்வு )	Research	2004	Tamil University, Thanjavur	-
10	Sirpiyin Vidhi- The Rule of the Sculptor (சிற்பியின் விதி)	A Collection of Short Stories in Tamil	2004	Kanaiyazhi Publication, Chennai	-
11	Kanaiyazhi Thalaiyangam- Kanaiyazhi Editorials (கணையாழி தலையங்கம்)	Editorials	2007	Kavitha Publication, Chennai	-
12	Ninakkappadum – Random Thoughts (நினைக்கப்படும்)	?	2007	Kavitha Publication, Chennai	-
13	Nigazhvukalin Pathivil – Records of Events (நிகழ்வுகளின் பதிவில்)	Nostalgia	2011 March 3		List of works were done at Tamil University
14	Chol Puthithu Porul Puthithu – New Word New Meaning (சொல் புதிது பொருள் புதிது)	Creation of Technical Terms in Tamil	2017	Kavitha Publication, Chennai	
15	India Ilakkiya Sirpi - Kalaignar Mu. Karunanithi - Indian Literary Sculptor - Kalaignar Mu. Karunanithi (இந்திய இலக்கியச் சிற்பி: கலைஞர் மு. கருணாநிதி)	Biography	2023	Sahitya Akademi, New Delhi	
16	Kālā picācukaḷ - Time demons (கால பிசாசுகள்)	Short Stories	2024	Yavarum Publications, Chennai	

=== Translations ===
His works have been translated into English and published in the following books:

1. Memory Mist; 2016 Dec 23; Pustaka Digital Media
2. TRIO Modern Tamil Stories; 2002; Writer's Workshop, Calcutta.

== Published by ==
W.No	Year of publication	Name of book	Genre	Publisher/Publisher	References
01		Thirukural Madurakeertham – (திருக்குறள் மதுரகீர்த்தனை)	Music Songs	Tamil Nadu Government	
02	1999	History of Tamil Language (தமிழ்மொழி வரலாறு)	Articles	Department of Tamil Development, Government of Tamil Nadu	
03	2000	Kuralamutham (குறளமுதம்)	Articles	Department of Tamil Development, Government of Tamil Nadu.	
04	2000	Thirukural Books (திருக்குறள் நூல்கள்)	Department of Tamil Development, Government of Tamil Nadu.		
05	1988	Achhil Vara Aruthamil Athisoody – Parimelazagar Text (அச்சில் வாரா அருத்தமிழ் ஆத்திசூடி – பரிமேலழகர் உரை)	Text	Department of Tamil Literature, Madras University, Chennai.	Journal: Research 2 & 3, 1984–85; First Ed. June 1988.
06	1981	Kathalkothu (காதல்கொத்து)	Poetry	Department of Archaeology, Government of Tamil Nadu	
07	2000	Glossary of Administrative Words in Tamil: General (ஆட்சிச்சொல்லகராதி: பொது)	Dictionary	Tamil Nadu Stationery Printing Department	6th Edition, Compiled by Department of Tamil Development,.
08		Rulers Oriental Traces Tables (அரசினர் கிழக்கியல் சுவடிகள் அட்டவணைகள்)	Bibliography	Government of Tamil Nadu	
09	2005	M. S. Pooranalingampillai (எம். எஸ். பூரணலிங்கம்பிள்ளை)	Study	International Institute of Tamil Studies, Chennai.	
10	2007	Professor A. M. Paramasivanandam (பேராசிரியர் அ. மு. பரமசிவானந்தம்)	Research	International Institute of Tamil Studies, Chennai.	
1	2009	Science and Tamil (அறிவியலும் தமிழும்)	Articles	Tamil University, Thanjavur.	Co-authored with Dr.Krithinamurthy, Dr.Rama Sundaram
12	2010	Chola Paintings (சோழர்கால ஓவியங்கள்)	Fine Art	Tamil University, Thanjavur.	
13	2016	Kaniyazi – Poems:1995–2000 (கணையாழி – கவிதைகள்:1995–2000)	Poems	Kavita Publications, Chennai.	
14	2016	Kaniyazhi – Stories:1995–2000 (கணையாழி – கதைகள்:1995–2000)	Stories	Mugavitha Publications, Chennai.	
15	2016	Kaniyazhi – Essays:1995 -2000 (கணையாழி – கட்டுரைகள்:1995–2000)	Essays	Kavita Publications, Chennai.	
16	2019	Kaniyazhi – Volume 1 : 1965 July – 1966 July (கணையாழி – தொகுதி 1 :1965 சூலை – 1966 சூலை)	Magazines	Kanyiyazhi Press, Chennai.	
17	2019	Kaniyazhi – Volume 2 : 1966 August – 1967 July) (கணையாழி – தொகுதி 2 : 1966 ஆகஸ்டு – 1967 சூலை)	Magazines	Kanyiyazhi Press, Chennai.	
18	2019	Kaniyazhi – Volume 3 : 1967 August – 1968 July) (கணையாழி – தொகுதி 3 : 1967 ஆகஸ்டு – 1968 சூலை)	Newspapers	Kaniyazhi Creative, Chennai.	
19	2019	Kaniyazhi – Volume 4 : 1968 August – 1969 July) (கணையாழி – தொகுதி 4 : 1968 ஆகஸ்டு – 1969 சூலை)	Magazines	Kanyiyazhi Press, Chennai.	
20	2019	Kaniyazhi – Volume 5 : 1969 August – 1970 July) (கணையாழி – தொகுதி 5 : 1969 ஆகஸ்டு – 1970 சூலை)	Newspapers	Kaniyazhi Creative, Chennai.	
21	2019	Pulamai vaṇakkam - Salute to Scholar (புலமை வணக்கம்)		Kavita Publications, Chennai.	

== Published journals ==
1. Publisher, Kaniyazhi, since 1995
2. Editor, Journal of Tamil studies, 2006–2008, International Institute of Tamil Studies, Chennai.

== Family ==
M. Rajendran's siblings are two girls. He is married to Mythily. They have two daughters Thendral and Ezhil and three grandchildren Meghnaa, Kevin and Thillana.
