= Avvai Natarajan =

Indian educationist (1936–2022)

Padma Shri Kalaimamani Avvai Natarajan
- ஔவை நடராசன்
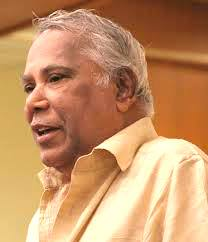
- Natarajan in 2016 or earlier

4-th Vice-Chancellor of Tamil University, Thanjavur
- In office 16 December 1992 - 15 December 1995
- Chancellor(s): Bhishma Narain Singh (1991-93); M. Channa Reddy (1993-96)
- Preceded by: C. Balasubramanian
- Succeeded by: K. Karunakaran

Personal details
- Born: Sivapatha Sekaran; 24 April 1936 Cheyyar, North Arcot District Madras Presidency, British India (now Tiruvannamalai District, Tamil Nadu, India)
- Died: 21 November 2022 (aged 86) Chennai, Tamil Nadu, India
- Spouse: Dr. Thara Natarajan
- Children: Kannan; N. Arul; Bharathan
- Parent(s): Logambal (mother); Avvai Duraisamy (father)
- Education: Thiagarajar College, Madurai; Pachaiyappa's College, Chennai
- Occupation: Tamil scholar
- Workplace: Bharath Institute of Higher Education and Research, Chennai
- Website: http://www.avvainatarajan.com/home

Sivapatha Sekaran, popularly known as Avvai Natarajan (24 April 1936 – 21 November 2022) was an Indian scholar and educationist from Tamil Nadu. He was theVice-Chancellor of Thanjavur Tamil University during 1992-95. The Government of India honored Natarajan in 2011, with the fourth highest civilian award of Padma Shri.

== Biography ==
Avvai Natarajan, hailing from the South Indian state of Tamil Nadu, was a secretary to the Government of Tamil Nadu in the Department of Tamil Language Development and Culture. Holder of an MLitt and a doctoral degree (PhD) in Tamil literature, Natarajan has also worked as the Vice Chancellor of Tamil University, Thanjavur. He was a member of the Central Institute of Classical Tamil, an institute established by the Government of India for propagation of classical Tamil language and culture. He also sat in the advisory councils of Sattakadir and the Madras Development Society. He has delivered keynote addresses in many seminars and held the chair of the selection committee of the Aram Award. In 2011, the Government of India honoured him with the civilian award of Padma Shri, honoring his contributions towards Tamil language and culture.

== Death ==
Natarajan died in Chennai, Tamil Nadu on 21 November 2022, at the age of 86.

== Awards ==
- Padma Shri - 2011
- S. P. Adithanar Senior Tamil Scholar Award - 2015

== See also ==
- Lists of Padma Shri award recipients
