= Sundaramoorthy =

Sundaramoorthy is an Indian surname. Notable people with this name include:

- E. Sundaramoorthy (born 1942), Tamil scholar
- R. Sundaramoorthy (fl. 1966), Indian make-up artist
- Yuven Sundaramoorthy (born 2003), Indian-American racing driver
