= Sakharam Rao =

Indian musician

Sakharam Rao (or Sakha Rama Rao, died 1928) was an Indian musician credited with having re-introduced the south Indian chitravina or gottuvadyam to the concert scene.

However, it was his father, Srinivasa Rao, who made the pioneering effort towards the reincarnation of the chitravina in modern times. He was an ardent music lover and an amateur artiste himself. He started experimenting with a slide on the tanpura (a four-stringed instrument, usually used as a reference drone in Indian music). Sakha Rama Rao was drawn to this instrument since childhood. He was able to perceive its tremendous potential to produce high-class music. He re-designed this instrument as a fretless veena with its usual set of seven strings - four strings on the top and three in the side for drone and rhythm. He put in arduous practice on this instrument and gave occasional performances.

Since he was not aware of the history of the instrument, he gave it a new name - gottuvadyam. This is because he used to casually refer to the slide as gotu. Vadyam, in Sanskrit and many other Indian languages, means instrument. Thus, gotuvadyam was a literal name for an instrument played with a slide.

Several decades later, Ravikiran, along with a few other scholars, studied about the origins of the instrument and eventually restored the more traditional name, chitravina. Sakha Rama Rao was a "musicians' musician" and trained many artists like Gotuvadyam Narayana Iyengar and Semmangudi Srinivasa Iyer. Soon there were several others who started performing on the instrument.
