= Akkarai Subhalakshmi =

Akkarai S. Subhalakshmi
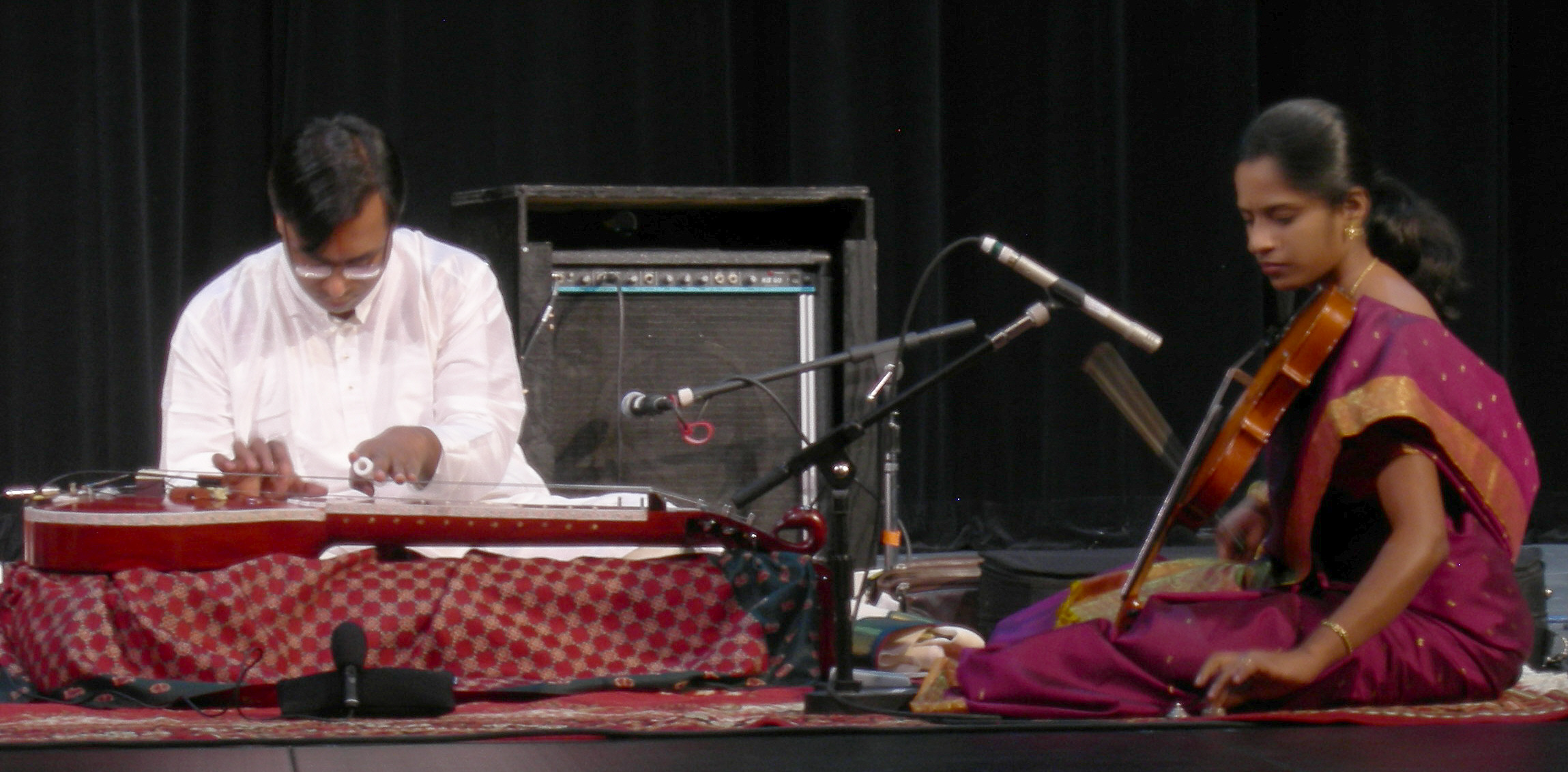
- Akkarai Subhalakshmi accompanying N. Ravikiran in a Carnatic Chitravina concert

Background information
- Genre: Classical
- Occupations: Violinist, singer
- Instrument: Violin

Akkarai S. Subhalakshmi is a 21st-century violinist in the field of Carnatic music. She is the daughter of violinist Akkarai Swaminathan. She and her younger musician sister Sornalatha are often referred to as Akkarai sisters in music circles.

== Life and career ==
Akkarai S Subhalakshmi is a South Indian classical (Carnatic) violinist and vocalist.

Subhalakshmi hails from a musical family. Her grandfather, Suchindram S P Sivasubramanian, was a prolific musician and composer, and her grandmother, R Sornambal a harikatha exponent and music teacher. Subhalakshmi is the disciple of her father, Akkarai S Swamynathan, a veteran violinist and founder of the Swara Raga Sudha school of music, and his intensive training enabled her to debut as a performing violinist and vocalist at the age of eight. She also trained under V Janakiraman, O V Subramanian and his daughter Padma Natesan of New Delhi, and later on, Padmabhushan P S Narayanaswamy and Chitravina N Ravikiran, who had her in many of his concerts and provided her with musical guidance and experience.

As an accompanist, she has played for many legendary artists such as M Balamuralikrishna, Chitravina N Ravikiran, T V Gopalakrishnan, N Ramani, Shashank Subramanyam, T. M. Krishna, R K Srikanthan and Jayanthi Kumaresh.
