= Poottaatha Poottukkal =

1980 film by Mahendran

- Poster
- Directed by: Mahendran
- Screenplay by: Mahendran
- Based on: Uravugal by Ponneelan
- Produced by: K. N. Lakshmanan
- Starring: Jayan; Charulata
- Cinematography: Ashok Kumar
- Edited by: B. Lenin
- Music by: Ilaiyaraaja
- Production company: Srisarasalaya
- Release date: 9 May 1980
- Running time: 122 minutes
- Country: India
- Language: Tamil

Poottaatha Poottukkal (transl. Unlocked locks) is a 1980 Indian Tamil-language drama film written and directed by Mahendran. It is an adaptation of the novel Uravugal by Ponneelan. The film stars Jayan and Charulata. It was released on 9 May 1980, and failed at the box-office.

== Plot ==
Fissures occur in a married couple's relationship when they are unable to conceive a child. The wife is later enamoured by a young man who gives her attention. What happens next forms the rest of the story.

== Cast ==
- Jayan as Uppuli
- Charulata as Kanniyamma
- Sunder Raj as Thyagu
- Archana as Velamma
- Samikannu as Kanniyamma's father
- Anbalaya Prabhakaran as Moorthy
- Rajasekhar as Uppuli's brother
- Kumarimuthu
- Baby Anju
- Master Haja Sheriff
- G. Srinivasan

== Production ==
Poottaatha Poottukkal is based on the novel Uravugal by Ponneelan. Panchu Arunachalam approached Mahendran to make a film based on this novel; despite initial reservations to direct due to its concept, he agreed after reading the end of the novel. Mahendran felt Bollywood actors Naseeruddin Shah and Smita Patil would be the perfect choice for this story, but Arunachalam felt Patil would create confusions in call sheets and insisted Mahendran to use local actors. Rajinikanth was featured in initial publicity material but did not appear in the finished film; he had reportedly been offered to act but declined. Charulatha who earlier acted in Mahendran's previous film Uthiripookkal portraying Vijayan's second wife was chosen as the lead actress while Arunachalam wanted Malayalam actor Jayan for husband's character; he was eventually chosen. The filming was primarily held at Nagercoil.

== Themes ==
According to Ram Chander of Film Companion, the film is a "subtle meditation on the invisible forces of societal expectations that weigh on married couples".

== Soundtrack ==
The soundtrack was composed by Ilaiyaraaja, with lyrics by Panchu Arunachalam.

Song	Singers	Length
"Vanna Vanna Poove"	S. Janaki	4:27
"Aanandam Aanandam"	S. Janaki	4:16
"Andipatti"	S. Janaki	4:31
"Nenjukkulle"	S. Janaki	4:25
"Soorai Kaatril"	Ilaiyaraaja	___

== Release and reception ==
Poottaatha Poottukkal was released on 9 May 1980. Bharathiraja and Ilaiyaraaja bought the distribution rights and released the film in Madurai and Ramanathapuram. However the film ran only for three weeks and failed at the box-office. Although Mahendran cautioned Bharathiraja against distributing the film, feeling it was too experimental, Bharathiraja continued and remained unperturbed by the film's failure as, according to Mahendran's son John, Bharathiraja "always stood for good cinema and what he believed to be good for cinema, even if it meant financial loss". Mahendran said the film's failure made him learn a lesson that he should not make films on such stories. Ponneelan said, "When an artist's work is translated into a film or drama, it is important that the spirit be maintained. Though a lamp is beautiful, it is the flame which is its spirit. If you can't bring it out, better not venture into that arena".

== Bibliography ==
- Mahendran (2013) [2004]. சினிமாவும் நானும் [Cinema and I] (in Tamil). Karpagam Publications. OCLC 54777094.
