= M. Thirumalai =

- ம. திருமலை
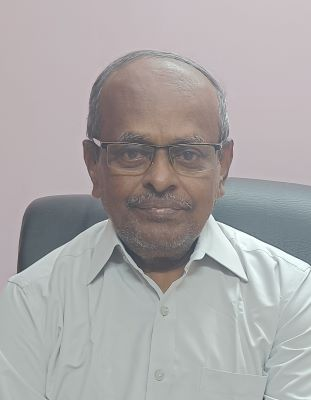

10th Vice-Chancellor, Tamil University, Thanjavur
- In office 10 February 2012 - 9 February 2015
- Chancellor: Konijeti Rosaiah (2011-16)
- Preceded by: M. Rajendran
- Succeeded by: G. Bhaskaran

Personal details
- Born: 1953 (age 72–73) Thummusinampatti, composite Ramanathapuram district, Madras State, (now Virudhunagar district, Tamil Nadu), India
- Education: Thiagarajar College, Madurai (B.A. & M.A. Tamil); Madurai Kamaraj University (PhD)

For the film director, see M. Thirumalai (director)

Dr. M. Thirumalai (born 1953), Former Vice-Chancellor of Tamil University, Thanjavur is a Tamil Scholar, Writer and former professor of Madurai Kamaraj University.

== Birth ==
He was born at Thummusinampatti at Aruppukkottai taluk in Virudhunagar district of Tamil Nadu, India.

== Education ==
He completed his school studies in Sholavandan, Madurai district. He did his bachelor's and master's degrees in Thiagarajar College, Madurai. His doctorate was on the comparative study on the works of Jayakanthan and Thakazhi Sivasankara Pillai, in the department of Tamilology in Madurai Kamaraj University, Madurai. Under his guidance 30 scholars completed their Ph.D.

== Career ==
He held various positions in Madurai Kamaraj University for nearly 31 years. They include Controller of Examinations, Director of Publications and Special Officer. In the Department of Comparative Studies in the Faculty of Tamilology of the university, he worked in various capacities including lecturer, professor and head of the department. From 10 February 2012 to 9 February 2015, he was the Vice chancellor of the Tamil University, Thanjavur.

== Books ==
He wrote 26 books. His technique of writing is praised by literary people. The books include the following:

- Ciṟupāṇāṟṟuppaṭai-Simple Commentary (Tamil: சிறுபாணாற்றுப்படை - தெளிவுரையும் விளக்கமும்)
- Comparative Literature-Theory and Practice (Tamil: ஒப்பிலக்கியம் - கொள்கைகளும் பயில்முறையும்)
- Art of Speaking (Tamil: பேச்சுக்கலை)
- Literary Roaming (Tamil: இலக்கிய உலா)
- Tamil Literature-Applied Perspective (Tamil: இனிய காண்க (தமிழ் இலக்கியம்-புதிய பார்வை))
- Obscurity (Theory and Practice)(Tamil: இருண்மையியல் கொள்கைகளும் பயில்முறைகளும்)
- Poruṇarāṟṟuppaṭai-Commentary with Critical Introduction (Tamil: பொருநராற்றுப்படை - விளக்கமும் நயவுரையும்)
- Critical Commentary of Mangudi Marunathar's Maturaikkāñci (Tamil: மாங்குடி மருதனாரின் மதுரைக்காஞ்சி - ஆய்வுரை)
- Tamil-Malayalam A Comparative Perspective (Tamil: தமிழ் மலையாள நாவல் ஒப்பாய்வு)
- Prefaces of Jayakanthan - A Critical Study (Tamil: ஜெயகாந்தனின் முன்னுரை இலக்கியம்)
- The Subtilities of Tamil Literature (Tamil: இலக்கிய நுட்பங்கள்)
- Literature and Reading (Tamil: இலக்கியமும் வாசிப்பும்)
