= S. Abdul Rahman =

Indian writer (1937 - 2017)

Syed Abdul Rahman
- Born: 9 November 1937
- Died: 2 June 2017 (aged 79)
- Other name: Kavikko
- Occupations: Poet, teacher, bureaucrat
- Notable work: Avalukku nila endru peyar, Aalapanai, Ithu siragugalin neram, Ilayilum irukiran, etc.
- Awards: Sahitya Akademi Award (1999)

Syed Abdul Rahman (9 November 1937 – 2 June 2017) was a Sahitya Akademi Award winning Tamil poet from Tamil Nadu, India. He was known by the title Kavikko (lit. Emperor among poets). He was ex-chairman of the Waqf board of Tamil Nadu.

== Biography ==
Syed Abdul Rahman was born in Madurai in 1937 and died on 2 June 2017. He was a professor of Tamil for 29 years at Islamiah College, Vaniyambadi. He belonged to the Vanambadi literary movement. He won the Sahitya Akademi award in 1999 under Tamil language category for his Poetry Aalaapanai. In 2009, he was made the chairman of the Waqf board of Tamil Nadu. He was also a member of the Tamil Language Promotion Board of the Central Institute of Classical Tamil.

== Books ==
- Avalukku nila endru peyar / அவளுக்கு நிலா என்று பெயர்
- Aalapanai / ஆலாபனை
- Ithu siragugalin neram / இது சிறகுகளின் நேரம்
- Ilayilum irukiran / இல்லையிலும் இருக்கிறான்
- Urangum Alagi / உறங்கும் அழகி
- Emoliyum semmolzhi / எம்மொழி செம்மொழி
- Kadavulin mugavari / கடவுளின் முகவரி
- Kaneer thuligalukku mugavari illai / கண்ணீர்த் துளிகளுக்கு முகவரி இல்லை
- Kambanin arasiyal kotpadu / கம்பனின் அரசியல் கோட்பாடு
- Karaigalae Nathiyavathuillai / கரைகளே நதியாவதில்லை 9
- Kavaikko kavithaigal / கவிக்கோ கவிதைகள்
- kavaithai or arathanai / கவிதை ஓர் ஆராதனை
- kakai soru / காக்கைச் சோறு
- Katru en manaivi / காற்று என் மனைவி
- Silanthiyin veedu / சிலந்தியின் வீடு
- Suttu Viral / சுட்டு விரல்
- Sontha siraikal / சொந்தச் சிறைகள்
- Sothimigu navakavithai / சோதிமிகு நவகவிதை
- Thattathe thiranthirukirathu / தட்டாதே திறந்திருக்கிறது
- Tagorin chitra / தாகூரின் சித்ரா
- Devaganam / தேவகானம்
- Tholaipesi kaneer / தொலைபேசிக் கண்ணீர்
- Nilavilirunthu vanthavan / நிலவிலிருந்து வந்தவன்
- Nerupai anaikkum nerupu / நெருப்பை அணைக்கும் நெருப்பு
- Neyar viruppam / நேயர் விருப்பம்
- Pasi entha sathi / பசி எந்தச் சாதி
- Paravaiyin pathai / பறவையின் பாதை
- Palveethi / பால்வீதி
- Pitthan / பித்தன்
- Pookaalam / பூக்காலம்
- Poopadaintha saptham / பூப்படைந்த சப்தம்
- Magarantha siragu / மகரந்தச் சிறகு
- Maram muttru pulli alla / மரணம் முற்றுப்புள்ளி அல்ல
- muttaivasigal / முட்டைவாசிகள்
- Muthangal oivathillai / முத்தங்கள் ஓய்வதில்லை
- Muthamilin mugavari / முத்தமிழின் முகவரி
- Vithaipol vilundhavan / விதைபோல் விழுந்தவன்
- Vilangugal illatha kavithai / விலங்குகள் இல்லாத கவிதை

== Awards and recognitions ==
- Kalaimamani award (1989)
- Bharathidasan award (1989)
- Ashara Award (1992)
- Sirpi Trust Award (1996)
- Kalaigner award (1997)
- Rana Literature award (1998)
- Sahitya Akademi Award -Tamil language (1999)
- Kambar Kavalar - Colombo Kamban Kalagam, Sri Lanka (2006)
- Kamban Kazhagam's Kambar award (2007)
- Podhigai TV's Pothigai award (2007)
- S. P. Adithanar Literary award (2007)
- Umaru Pulavar award (2008)

== See also ==
- List of Sahitya Akademi Award winners for Tamil
- List of Indian writers
- List of Tamil-language writers
