= K. Savitri Ammal =

Indian Gottuvadhyam player

K. Savitri Ammal (19 June 1922 – 8 August 1973) was an Indian Gottuvadhyam player. She belonged to the Isai Vellalar community. She began learning carnatic vocal from Srirangam Iyengar later she underwent training playing the instrument from Kambangudi Narayana Rao. She got special training to master the rhythmic aspects of Carnatic music under konnakkol Mannargudi Vaidyalingam Pillai. She was the first female Gottuvadhyam artiste. She received Kalaimamani award from Government of Tamil Nadu in 1968.

== Awards ==
Kalaimamani award from Government of Tamil Nadu in 1968
