= G. Balasubramanian =

Indian academic

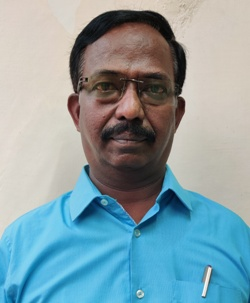

12th Vice-Chancellor of Tamil University, Thanjavur
- In office 4 October 2018 - 3 October 2021
- Chancellor(s): Banwarilal Purohit (2017-21); R. N. Ravi (2021- )
- Preceded by: G. Bhaskaran
- Succeeded by: V. Thiruvalluvan

Personal details
- Born: 15 April 1959 (age 67) Kaduvakkudi, Tanjore District, Madras State, (now Thiruvarur District, Tamil Nadu), India
- Education: Madurai Kamaraj University

G. Balasubramanian served as the Vice-Chancellor of Tamil University, Thanjavur, in Tamil Nadu, India, from 4 October 2018 to 3 October 2021.

== Birth ==
He was born on 15 April 1959 at Kaduvakkudi village in Mannargudi taluk in Thiruvarur district of Tamil Nadu. He did his M.A. in Linguistics (1983) and in Tamil literature (1989) and Ph.D. at Madurai Kamaraj University.

== Profession ==
He worked as research fellow and research associate (1987–89) in the Department of Ancient Industries of Tamil University, Thanjavur, Tamil Nadu Lecturer and Reader (1989-2006) in Linguistics (Tamil), Department of Malayalam of University of Calicut, Kerala, Associate Professor and Professor (2006-2009, 2011–16) and Rector (2016–18) in Department of Dravidian and Computational Linguistics, of Dravidian University, Kuppam, Andhra Pradesh, Visiting Professor of Tamil in Department of South Asian Studies, of Faculty of Oriental Studies, Warsaw University, Poland (2009–11). He wrote many research articles on linguistics and Tamilology.

== Research works ==
=== Other academic visits ===
- Visited Charles University in Prague as a consultant for the Project on Pandanus, 30 July - 4 August 2011
- External Examiner for BATL, SIM/SUSS University, Singapore, 4–7 October 2015, 5–6 October 2016 and 9–10 October 2017
- Participated and presented a paper in the International Conference on "Dictionaries in Asia: Research and Pedagogical Implications", held at Hong Kong University of Science and Technology, Hong Kong, 26–29 March 1997

=== Translation ===
He knew Tamil (mother tongue), English, Malayalam and Telugu (working knowledge). He translated many articles from Tamil to Malayalam and vice versa.

=== Other works ===
His projects include Survey, Documentation and Revitalization of Endangered Languages in the Border Districts of Chittoor of Andhra Pradesh, Krishnagiri of Tamil Nadu and Kolar of Karnataka (UGC, 2015-2020), Border area Bilingualism of Tamil Nadu and Andhra Pradesh : A Study of Language Attitudes, Language Use and Convergence (UGC, 2015-2019), Malama:kku: A Linguistic Description and Assessment of Language Endangerment (UGC), Language of Malakka:ran: Phonology with Vocabulary (Dravidian University, 2007–08) and Linguistic Description of Mahl (Lakshadweep Socio-cultural Research Commission, 2001–02) He presented and published more than 20 research articles in national and international level.

=== Books ===
- Translated Zero Degree, the Tamil Novel (by Charu Nivedita) from Tamil into Malayalam, (Co-translator: P.M.Girish), Current Books, Thrissur, First Impression, September 2001
- Studies in Linguistics, Prof.T.B.Venugopala Panicker Felicitation Volume, (Ed) University of Calicut, 2006
- Translated the book Flowers and Formulas (by Jaroslav Vacek) from English into Tamil as Saṅga Ilakkiyattil iyaṟkaikKuṟiyiiṭu:Ainthiṇai Malarkaḷum, Marapukaḷum, (Tamil: சங்க இலக்கியத்தில் இயற்கைக் குறியீடு : ஐந்திணை மலர்களும் மரபுகளும்), Adayalam, Putthanattham, I Edition, 2015
- Moziyiyal oppu Nōkku, (Tamil: மொழியியல் ஒப்பு நோக்கு), Sri Venkateswara Publications, Kuppam, I Edition, 2018
- Reflections in Applied Linguistics, Excel India Publishers, New Delhi, First Impression, August 2018

== Awards ==
- State Teacher Award for 2013 (Government of Andhra Pradesh)
