= Apollo Chamber Players =

American string quartet

Apollo Chamber Players is an American string quartet based in Houston, Texas. The ensemble, composed of Violinist and Founder Matthew Detrick, Violinist Anabel Ramirez Detrick, Violist Whitney Bullock and Cellist Matthew Dudzik, are known for their distinctive, globally-inspired programming and have garnered international recognition for unique performances and a diverse catalog of commissioned works. In January 2017, they became the first American chamber music group to perform and record in the nation of Cuba since 1960. The group has been featured on national broadcast radio on several occasions as part of American Public Media's Performance Today program.

The ensemble's fifth studio album With Malice Toward None has been met with critical acclaim. James Manheim of AllMusic writes that the project is "a well-performed set of entirely novel chamber music". Jon Sobel of Blogcritics calls the album a "varied yet thematically contiguous fusion of international traditions and modern innovation".

== Commissions ==
Composers commissioned by the Apollo Chamber Players include Libby Larsen, Jerod Impichchaachaaha' Tate, Kimo Williams, N. Ravikiran, Pamela Z, Javier Farias, Vũ Nhật Tân, J.E. Hernández, Vanessa Vo, Jovino Santos Neto, Malek Jandali, Christopher Theofanidis and Jennifer Higdon among many others. From 2014 to 2020 the ensemble commissioned new music as part of its 20x2020 project.

== Recordings ==
- European Folkscapes (Navona Records, 2014)
- Blurred Boundaries (Navona Records, 2016)
- Ancestral Voices (Navona Records, 2017)
- Within Earth (Navona Records, 2019)
- With Malice Toward None (Azica Records, 2021)
- MoonStrike (Azica Records, 2022)
