= Tamil University =

University in Thanjavur, Tamil Nadu, India

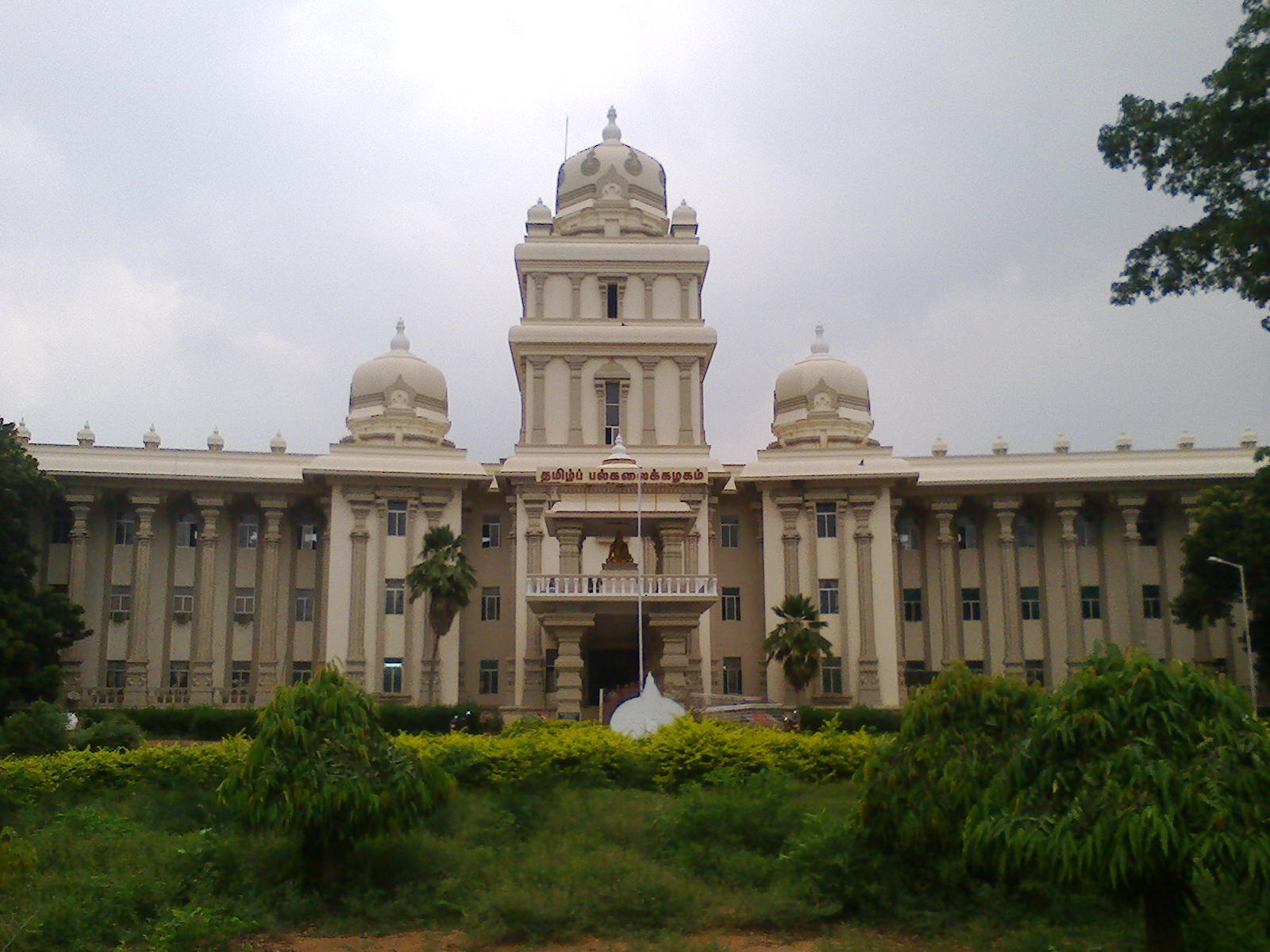
- Administrative block of Tamil University
- Motto: உள்ளுவதெல்லாம் உயர்வுள்ளல் (Translit: Uḷḷuvatellām uyarvuḷḷal)
- Motto in English: Whatever you think, think it in a big way
- Type: Public
- Established: 15 September 1981 (44 years ago)
- Founder: M. G. Ramachandran
- Affiliations: UGC
- Chancellor: Governor of Tamil Nadu
- Vice-Chancellor: Vacant
- Location: Thanjavur, Tamil Nadu, India; 10.739°N 79.095°E
- Campus: 900 acres (3.6 km^{2})
- Website: www.tamiluniversity.ac.in

The Tamil University is a public state university located in Thanjavur, Tamil Nadu, India. It was established to provide higher research in the Tamil language.

== Location ==
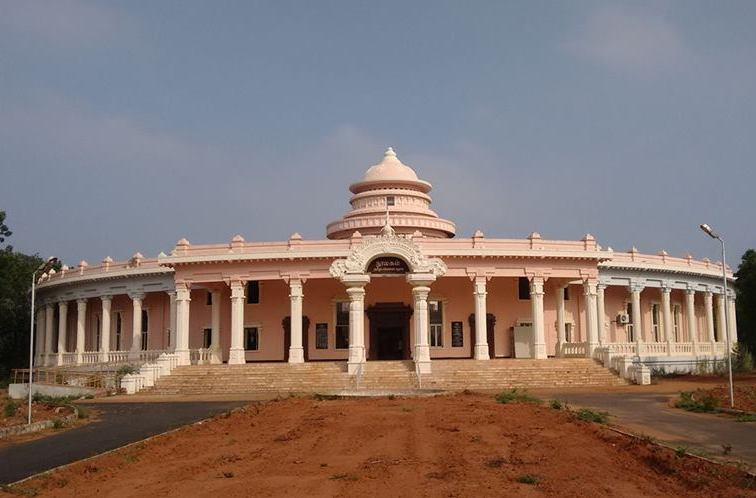
Library

The university is situated in a campus of about 900 acres (3.6 km^{2}), granted by the State government of Tamil Nadu, making it the largest university in the state by area. Buildings and blocks for the administrative and academic departments are located in the campus. The administrative block with its gopuram motif can be seen from the National Highway connecting Thanjavur with Trichy. The library is similar to the Indian Parliament at New Delhi. The Karikalan Gallery, built on the occasion of the World Tamil Conference is capable of accommodating about 2000 people.

== Vice Chancellors ==
Sl. No.	Name	Period of Service
1	V. I. Subramoniam	19.09.1981 to 19.06.1984 and 22.09.1984 to 31.07.1986
2	S. Agasthialingom	01.12.1986 to 30.11.1989
3	C. Balasubramanian	04.12.1989 to 03.12.1992
4	Avvai Natarajan	16.12.1992 to 15.12.1995
5	K. Karunakaran	11.01.1996 to 03.09.1998
6	Kadir Mahadevan	19.02.1999 to 14.09.2001
7	E. Sundaramoorthy	19.12.2001 to 18.12.2004
8	C. Subramaniam	06.06.2005 to 05.06.2008
9	M. Rajendran	19.06.2008 to 18.06.2011
10	M. Thirumalai	10.02.2012 to 09.02.2015
11	G. Bhaskaran	06.08.2015 to 05.08.2018
12	G. Balasubramanian	04.10.2018 to 03.10.2021
13	V. Thiruvalluvan	13.12.2021 to 20.11.2024
Acting	K. Shankar	November/December 2024 - present

== See also ==
- World Tamil Conference
