= Inquilab (writer) =

Indian writer (1944–2016)

Makkal Pavalar Inquilab
- Born: S.H.S. Sahul Hameed c. 1944; Kilakarai, Ramanathapuram district, Tamil Nadu, India)
- Died: 1 December 2016 (aged 72); Urapakkam, Tamil Nadu, India
- Occupation: Tamil Professor
- Children: 1 Daughter (Ameena Parvin) and 2 Sons
- Writing career
- Pen name: Inquilab
- Language: Tamil
- Subject: Literature
- Notable works: Avvai, Kaandhal Naatkal
- Notable awards: Sahitya Akademi Award (2017)
- Movement: Marxist

S.H.S. Sahul Hameed (Born 1944 – 1 December 2016) was a Sahitya Akademi Award winning Tamil poet, writer, activist from Tamil Nadu.He was known by his pen name Inquilab.Also fondly called as Makkal Pavalar

== Biography ==
Inquilab birth name was orthodox Muslim family as S.H.S. Sahul Hameed at Kilakarai in Ramanathapuram district in Tamil Nadu. He studied in Thiagarajar College in Madurai. He retired as a Tamil professor at The New College, Chennai, Tamil Nadu.Inquilab had three children, one daughter (Ameena Parvin) and two sons.

== Political Participation ==
He was initially drawn to the Dravidian movement and jailed for taking part in the 1965 Anti-Hindi protests. However, after the 1968 Kilvenmani massacre of Dalits, he shifted toward Marxism and became a member of Communist Party of India (Marxist) (CPI-M).He was working with various Left and Marxist-Leninist groups. He also met LTTE founder Velupillai Prabhakaran. He also a well known follower of Periyar.

== Literary Career ==
At the age of 12, Inquilab wrote his first poem, on the harassment of a little girl who had been abandoned in a dargha as a mentally ill child.His poems espousing rationality have been critically acclaimed.Kanmani Rajam, his most famous poem, criticizes the moral bankruptcy of politicians.

His song/poem Naanga Manushangada (We are human beings) is a famous Dalit-freedom song that is still played in many Dalit gatherings. Avvai, his drama is considered to be the first modern Tamil drama, and a prescribed textbook for many colleges. In this revisionist account, the historical/mythic Avvai, contrary to the prevalent image of her as an old, wise, celibate woman, is rendered as a young, sensuous, creative, 'free' person, a wandering bard.The play also challenges the patriarchal view which has marginalized the female voice.

His other famous literary works include modern versions of Manimekalai and Kuṟiñcippāṭṭu.

He was also involved in vocal expression of discontent of removal of statue of a Tamil legendary icon Kannagi in 2002 by the then AIADMK-led Government of Tamil Nadu.

He has been selected posthumously for the Sahitya Akademi Award for his book Kaandhal Naatkal in 2017. However, his family declined the award, saying he did not write expecting awards and felicitations.

== Bibliography ==
=== Essays ===
- Ethirsol (எதிர்சொல்)
- Inquilab Katturaigal (இன்குலாப் கட்டுரைகள்)
- Inqulab Nadagangal (இன்குலாப் நாடகங்கள்)

=== Interview Compilation ===
- Inquilab Nerkanalgal (இன்குலாப் நேர்காணல்கள்)
- Maanuda Kural: Inquilab Nerkanalgal (மானுடக் குரல்: இன்குலாப் நேர்காணல்கள்)

=== Drama ===
- Avvai (ஔவை)

=== Short Story ===
- Ovoru Pullayum Peyar Solli Alaiypen (ஒவ்வொரு புல்லையும் பெயர் சொல்லி அழைப்பேன்)
- Paalayil Oru Sunai (பாலையில் ஒரு சுனை)
- Aanal (ஆனால்)

=== Poetry ===
- Kaandhal Naatkal (காந்தள் நாட்கள்)
- Theeratha Kavithuvathin Sudar (தீராத கவித்துவத்தின் சுடர்)

=== Translation ===
- Yata Durei Jai - Bengali Poems (நான் போகும் இடமெல்லாம்)

== Death ==
He died at the age of 72 on 1st December 2016 when he underwent treatment in private hospital in Chennai. His family donated his body to the Chengalpattu Government Medical College hospital as per his wishes

== Awards and recognitions ==
- Sahitya Akademi Award for Tamil (2017)
- Kalaimamani Award (2006)

== See also ==
- List of Sahitya Akademi Award winners for Tamil
- List of Indian writers
- List of Tamil-language writers
