= S. P. Adithanar Senior Tamil Scholar Award =

S. P. Adithanar Senior Tamil Scholar Award, is presented annually to recognize senior Tamil scholar for their lifetime contribution. It was instituted by Daily Thanthi groups in the memory of S. P. Adithanar, founder of Daily Thanthi. The award is presented on anniversary celebration of S.P. Adithanar every year at Rani Seethai Hall. It is presented in the name of Mootha Thamizharingnar for their literary contribution, which consists of 3 Lakh rupees prize money.

== Recipients ==
- Erode Thamizhanban - 2017
- Dr. Aruko - 2016
- Ma. Mu. Sethuraman - 2015
- Avvai Natarajan - 2014
- Ponneelan - 2012
- Kumari Ananthan - 2011
- V. C. Kulandaiswamy - 2010
- M.R.P. Gurusamy

== See also ==
- S. P. Adithanar Literary Award
