= S. P. Adithanar Literary Award =

S. P. Adithanar Literary award, is presented annually to recognize Tamil author for their literature work. It was instituted by Daily Thanthi groups in the memory of S. P. Adithanar, founder of Daily Thanthi. The award is presented on anniversary celebration of S.P. Adithanar every year at Rani Seethai Hall. It consists of 2 Lakh rupees prize money.

== Recipients ==
- V.Irai Anbu - 2017.
- Thayammal aravanan - 2016.
- Thangar Bachan - 2015
- G. Balan - 2014.
- Mylswamy Annadurai - 2013.
- Vikraman - 2012
- Gouthama Neelambaran - 2011.
- Mu. Metha - 2010.
- Dr.Valampuri John
- Kavikko Abdul Rahman - 2007.
- Ponnadiyan - 2004.

== See also ==
- S. P. Adithanar Senior Tamil Scholar Award
