= Arjun Ayyangar =

American pianist and child prodigy

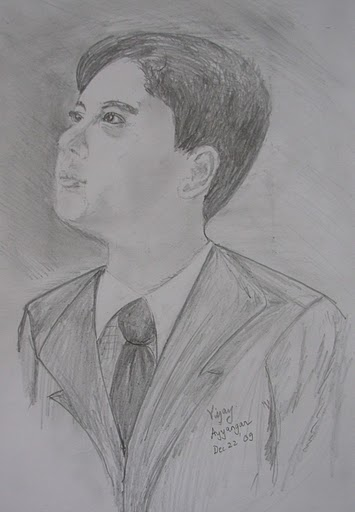
- Born: June 8, 1998 (age 27)
- Occupation: Pianist
- Title: Child prodigy Piano Virtuoso

Arjun Ayyangar (born June 8, 1998) is an American pianist and child prodigy from New Jersey. Ayyangar was recognized by the Limca Book of Records and Ripley's Believe It or Not for his ability to play all United Nations recognized national anthems. In 2003, he appeared on NBC's America's Most Talented Kid, performing Fur Elise and the theme song to Star Wars. He is also the youngest Goodwill Ambassador for Empower the Children.

In June 2003, Ayyangar won a first place High Honors Award Certificate at the New Jersey Music Teachers Association Young Artists' Competition. In 2004, he performed at the Kimmel Center for the Performing Arts in Philadelphia and The War Memorial Auditorium in Trenton. Later that year, he was featured on Animal Planet's Most Extreme: Tough Babies. In 2005, he performed during halftime at a New York Knicks basketball game.

Ayyangar was inducted into T he Kids Hall of Fame at age 6.

== Awards ==
- November 20, 2002, Third Place in Young Pianists Performance in New Jersey Musical Teachers Association
- April 4, 2003, Semi-finalist, America's Most Talented Kid in NBC
- April 10, 2003, High Honors, in Young Pianists Performance New Jersey Musical Teachers Association
- May 31, 2003, SANO IMF Scholarship, in The 18th International Music Festival
- May 31, 2004, Winner - Piano in American Fine Arts Festival, Merkin Concert Hall, New York City, New York
- January 19, 2005, Inductee to The Kids Hall of Fame

== News Coverage ==
- Boy, 3, gives first piano recital at Old Bridge library: Suburban News
- Concerto at 4: India Abroad
- Young pianist featured at festival: Tri-Town News
- What Were You Playing at Age 5? Probably Not a Bach Minuet in G: The Reporter, Four Corners, Florida
- Fame child's play for Arjun:The India Abroad
