= Melharmony =

Form of musical composure

Melharmony is an avant-garde form of musical composition that explores new harmonies and voice leading anchored on melodic progression. In other words, melharmony aims to create chords and counterpoints based on the melodic rules of evolved systems across the world. Melharmony thus blends the two primary, yet diverse concepts in world music - melody and harmony. It was originally proposed and developed by musician-composer N. Ravikiran. British-American composer Robert Morris further developed it from the standpoint of Western theory. Melharmony is a style of music that takes into consideration the rules and aesthetics of melody-centric systems like Indian classical as well as harmony-anchored systems like Western classical and jazz but is not limited to only those.

== Definition and approach ==
Melharmony has been defined as "harmony and vertical layers of music with an emphasis on the rules and principles of highly evolved melodic systems". It was initially seen as a unique classical fusion engaging Western and Indian classical systems, though it has subsequently also been a synthesis of melodic rules of India's classical music with jazz, Brazilian and other world cultures.

American composer and music theorist Robert Morris notes, "Melharmony therefore suggests that voice leading should be derived from the melodic and combinational structure of a mode (raga). Further, while almost any note combination could be workable when rendered successively, only certain combinations will be palatable when rendered simultaneously, which makes melharmony all the more intricate."

While a number of systems like the Raga system of Indian Carnatic Music/Hindustani classical music, Chinese Music and Makam system of Persia or have been built upon solid melodic principles dating back to thousands of years, Indian and Chinese systems, which use a twelve-tone musical system like Western classical music would be easier to "melharmonize" as opposed to Persian/Arabic systems, some of which could have as many as nine micro-tonal intervals or comma within every whole tone

Morris further notes that melharmony could apply to African combinations as well and it also fits older forms of western music that evolved out the monophonic plainchant of the 10th century, CE. Until about 1550, western melodies were based on modes.

== Classical Western harmony and melharmony ==
Classical Western approach to harmony has been triad-centric for centuries though other important tools include ostinato, contrary movements, rhythmic augmentation or diminution, imitation etc. are also vital techniques. However, extrapolating a triad-centric approach to melodic systems like Indian Carnatic classical which have intricate rules for hundreds of modes (ragas) often creates conflicting results.

Melharmony shifts the focus from triad-centric harmony to fragmentation for creating multiple parts. If fragmentation were to anchor harmony in close alliance with melodic rules of diverse systems, one will be able to employ triadic harmony, ostinato and other tools around it, which will result in reconciling both melodic and harmonic approaches.

== Melodic principles in melharmony ==
Melharmony functions on a sophisticated set of principles that also take into consideration melodic rules and structure. Melodic systems in many parts of the world have tended to expand horizontally, exploring more scales and modes with specific ascending and descending sequences as opposed to the primary Major or Minor scales which form the core of harmonic systems. An instance of this would be the Carnatic music of India where each raga (mode) demands integrity to scale, sequence, key phrases (fragmentation), hierarchy of notes within its structure and so forth. In other words, each raga is not merely a melodic mode or scale but a unique melodic scheme. Melharmony pays attention to these rules while creating multiple parts.

== Illustration ==
Illustration 1 - Sequence of notes: The sequence of a raga Kadanakutoohalam is C D F A B E G C - C B A G F E D C. Even though it is using the same notes as C major, a major chord like C-E-G will not sound as appropriate in a melharmonic context as E-G-C. D-F-A would work very well but in the case of E-G-B, an inversion (B-E-G) could be a good option. F-A-C, G-B-D and A-C-E would also be non-appropriate.

Illustration 2 - Hierarchy of notes: Arabhi uses a simple sequence: C D F G A C - C B A G F E D C. But B and E are employed only fleetingly in this raga, which eliminates several chord options including C-E-G (in any permutation). However, careful choices such as F-A-D (rather than D-F-A) can make the melody come alive since all three notes are dominant in this raga.

Illustration 3 - Ornamentation of notes: Raga Shankarabharanam, (one of the "Big-6" modes in Carnatic) is the equivalent of the major scale: C D E F G A B C - C B A G F E D C. But several chords that are routinely employed in Western compositions may not sound appropriate to the raga's character, because of certain ornamentation which include oscillation of notes like D, F and A, a force imparted to B which almost pushes it to the high C and so forth. Chord triads which sound appropriate in a melharmonic context (such as diminished B-D-F ) are more exceptions to the rule.

The above illustrations do not imply that melharmony is limited in scope. Quite the converse since there are diverse harmonic options in many ragas which can be explored and employed appropriately. Similar melharmonic options can be created for any highly evolved melodic system.

== Performance repertoire ==
Melharmonic compositions employ a diverse forms, some of which are original. They also employ musical forms of Western classical such as daprice, étude and concerto for various instruments and also forms like geetam and krti (also spelt as kriti), which are used in Indian Carnatic music. They often showcase ragas novel to Western audiences and often feature inventive rhythmic cadences, mathematical codas and embedded sequences suggestive of melodic improvisation.

Melharmonic arrangements of traditional Indian composers including Tyagaraja, Oottukkadu Venkata Kavi and Muthuswami Dikshitar have been performed by various professional symphonies & chamber orchestras, string orchestras, quartets and quintets ensembles as well as Jazz, Rock & world music groups. Melharmony plays a dynamic role in Jazz and world music concerts, when coupled with interesting rhythms. It has been acknowledged to have had a “profound influence on many musicians' notions of improvisation”.

== Melharmony festivals ==
Melharmony festivals featuring two master composers who were contemporaries from the diverse worlds of melody and harmony such as OVK-Bach Festival centered on the creations and contributions of Oottukkadu Venkata Kavi (1700 - 1765) from the East and Johann Sebastian Bach (1685 - 1750) from the West or Tyagaraja (1767-1847)—Mozart (1756–91) Festival and Dikshitar (1775-1835)—Beethoven (1770-1827) Festival have pioneered a new era in world music. The highlight of such festivals are performances of traditional Eastern melodic and Western harmony-centric repertoire and a climactic section of Melharmonic arrangements of pure melodic works performed by Western orchestras and ensembles.

General Melharmony Festivals and events have been held in Göttingen, Germany, the Goetheanum in Switzerland, London, Bradford, Manchester and other cities in UK and in various cities in USA including Houston and Minneapolis.

== Melharmony in schools and colleges ==
Since melharmony gives practical perspectives in different world music systems effortlessly, it has been increasingly used to provide educative and exciting performing experience for orchestra students in schools in cities such as Madison, Houston, Middleton, Round Rock, Oregon, Sun Prairie, Sacramento, Minneapolis etc. in United States, from Middle School to Youth Symphony Levels. Orchestras have been part of melharmony residencies and camps and performed pieces in their concerts.

== Academic papers and college courses ==
Prof. Robert Morris' (Chair of composing, Eastman School of Music, NY) paper - 'Ravikiran's Concept of Melharmony: An Inquiry into Harmony in South Indian Ragas" in the Society for Music Theory Conference in Nov 2005, Boston, USA, brought out several theoretical aspects of Melharmony that could be applied by both composers and students of Western systems. In the New York AAWM Conference (June 2016), Morris shared recent developments on two-voice frameworks and the harmonization of Indian ragas, citing melharmony. Papers, panel discussions and lectures presented in various conferences in Amsterdam, Houston, Orlando and other cities have highlighted diverse aspects of the concept.

Eastman School of Music, Rochester, NY presented a college credit course on the subject in August 2015. Other institutions such as the Massachusetts Institute of Technology in Boston, the University of Georgia in Columbus, the University of Colorado in Boulder, and Leeds College of Music in the UK, have presented workshops or classroom lectures on melharmony.
