= N. Ravikiran =

Indian slide instrumentalist and vocalist

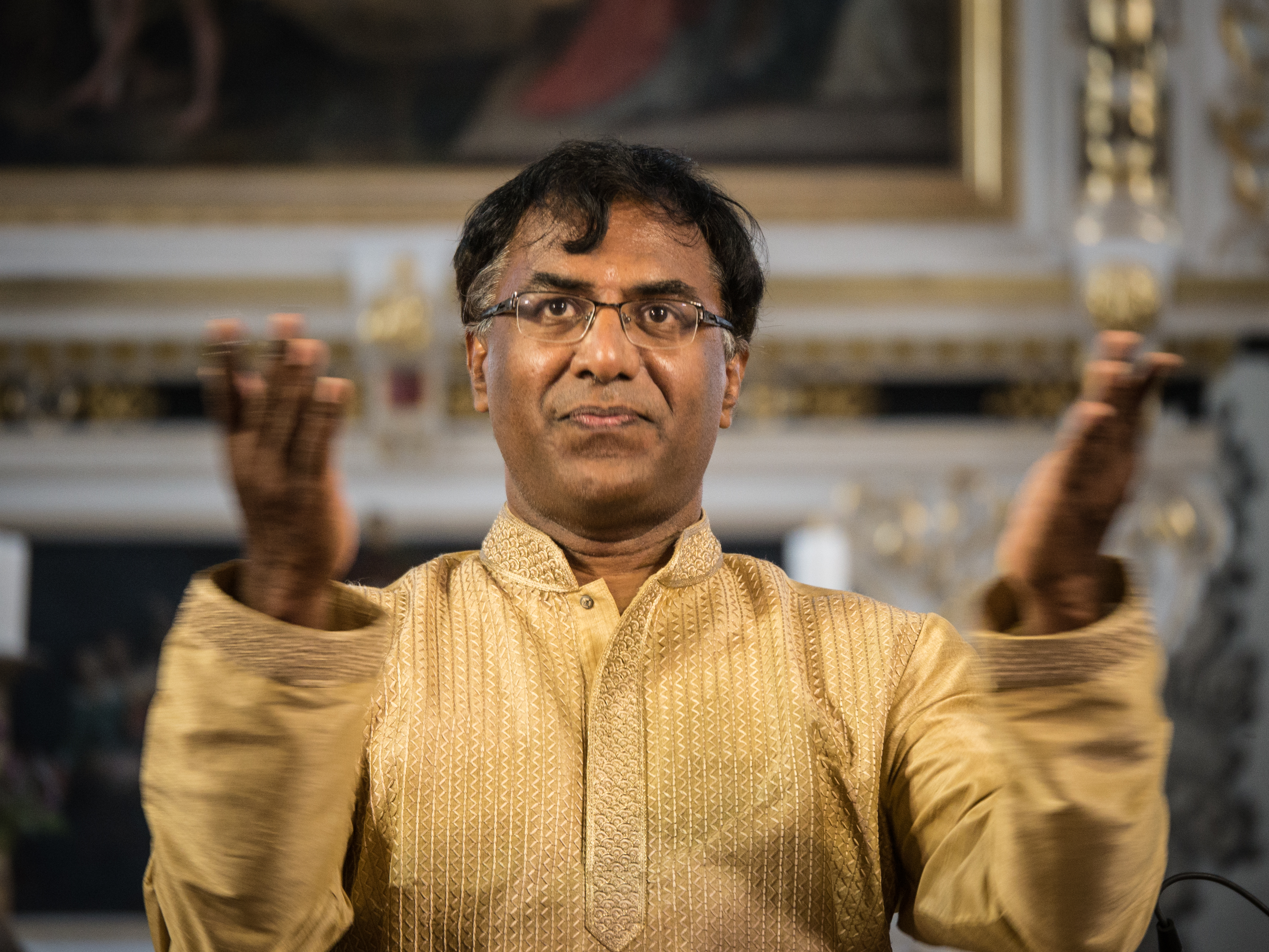

Background information
- Born: 12 February 1967 (age 59); Mysore, India
- Genres: Indian classical music, Carnatic music, world music, melharmony
- Occupations: Instrumentalist, vocalist, musical composer
- Instrument: Chitravina
- Years active: 1969 – present
- Website: ravikiranmusic.com

Narasimhan Ravikiran (born 12 February 1967) is an Indian slide instrumentalist, vocalist, composer, and orator, who created the concept of melharmony. He is the son of gottuvadhyam player Chitravina Narasimhan and the grandson of Narayan Iyengar, who was also a Carnatic musician.

== Early life ==
Ravikiran was born in Mysore, Karnataka. He made his first appearance at the age of two, in April and again in August 1969, in Bangalore, and was interviewed by Semmangudi Srinivasa Iyer, Pandit Ravi Shankar, M S Subbulakshmi and Flute T R Mahalingam. He also performed at the XLIII Madras Music Conference held at The Madras Music Academy in December 1969, and was awarded a scholarship from the academy. He was able to identify about 325 ragas (melodic scales) and 175 talas (rhythmic cycles) of Carnatic music. Ravi Shankar is said to have declared "If you don't believe in God, look at Ravikiran". Soon after, he was presented at musical institutions such as Shanmukhananda Fine Arts, Bombay and Tyagaraja Sabha, Coimbatore.

Following training under his father, Chitravina Narasimhan, Ravikiran debuted as a vocalist in 1972, when he was five years old, in Coimbatore. He performed at concerts in Madras, Mysore and Bangalore until he was 10. His recitals – often over two and a half hours – drew large audiences and won critical acclaim in the Indian media.

== Career ==
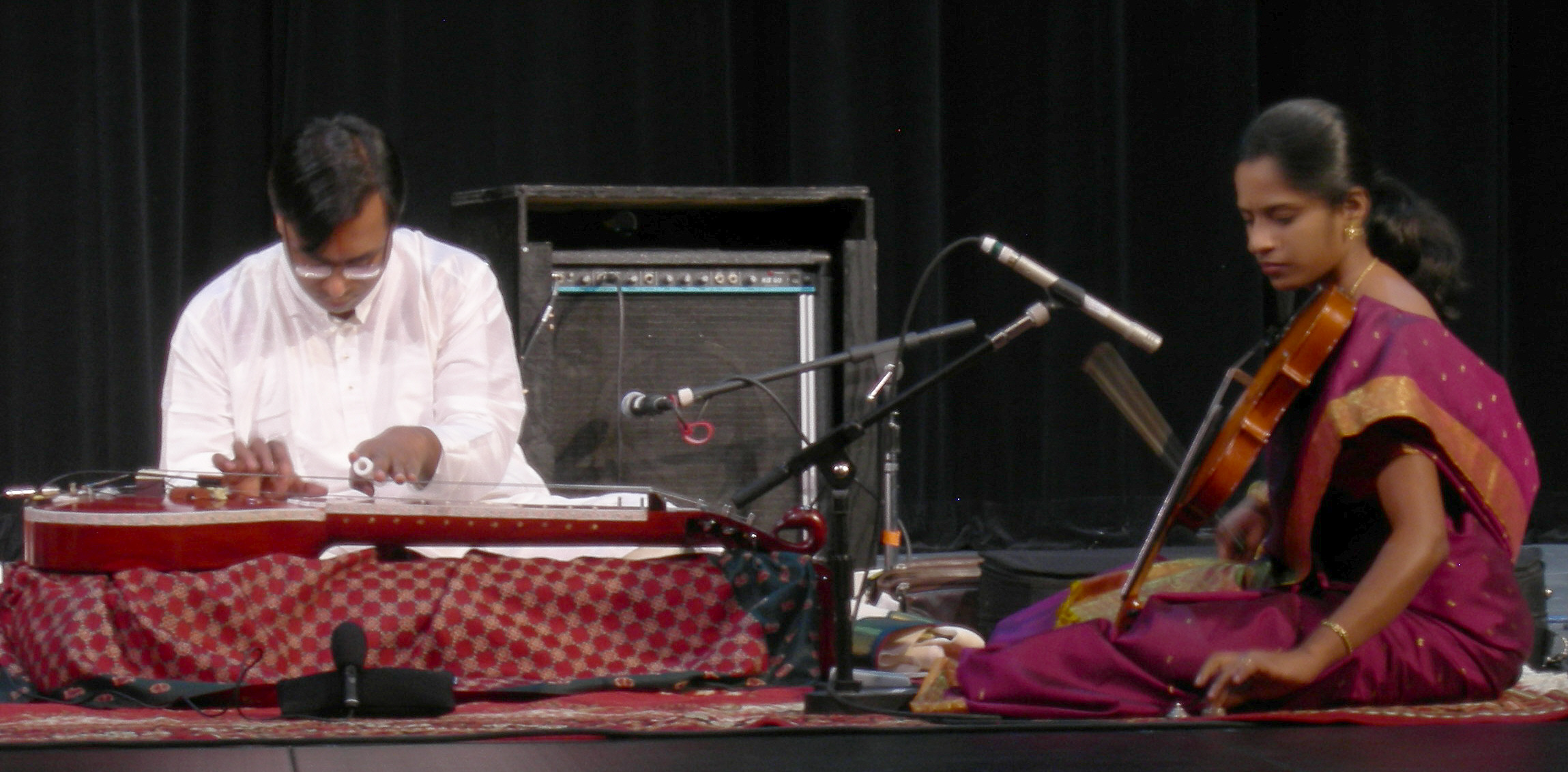
Ravikiran with Akkarai Subhalakshmi

Ravikiran also established himself as a string instrumentalist at an early age. In July 1985, he set a record with a 24-hour non-stop solo concert in Chennai. He won an exemption to perform professional concerts for Indian Radio and Television (Doordarshan) at age 12 and was invited to represent his country in Festivals of India in France (1985), Switzerland (1987), Germany (1992), Brazil (2012) and countries like Poland, Czech Republic, Austria and Yugoslavia (1997). He has performed extensively in major events and venues across the world including the Chicago World Music Festival, Theatre de la Ville Paris, Europalia Festival, Belgium, Millennium Festival (UK), Rudolstadt Festival, Germany, Masters of Indian Music, Budapest, Sadlers Wells & Tate Modern (UK), Esplanade Festival (Singapore), Oji Hall (Tokyo), Harborfront Festival, Canada, Cleveland Festival & Madison Festival (USA).

From 1986 to 1996, Ravikiran trained with the vocalist T. Brinda. He is acknowledged for reviving classical values among the youth. He has performed with other artists and presented several concerts which include pure solos, duos with kanjira/ghatam/mridangam apart from conventional recitals with multiple accompanists and collaborations with piano, keyboard, guitar and other instruments.

He resumed his appearance as vocalist from 1999 and has since presented voice concerts for organizations in and outside India including the Cleveland Festival & the Chicago World Music Festival. His vocal albums include Genius at Work.

Ravikiran has introduced several technical innovations on the chitravina.

== Composer ==
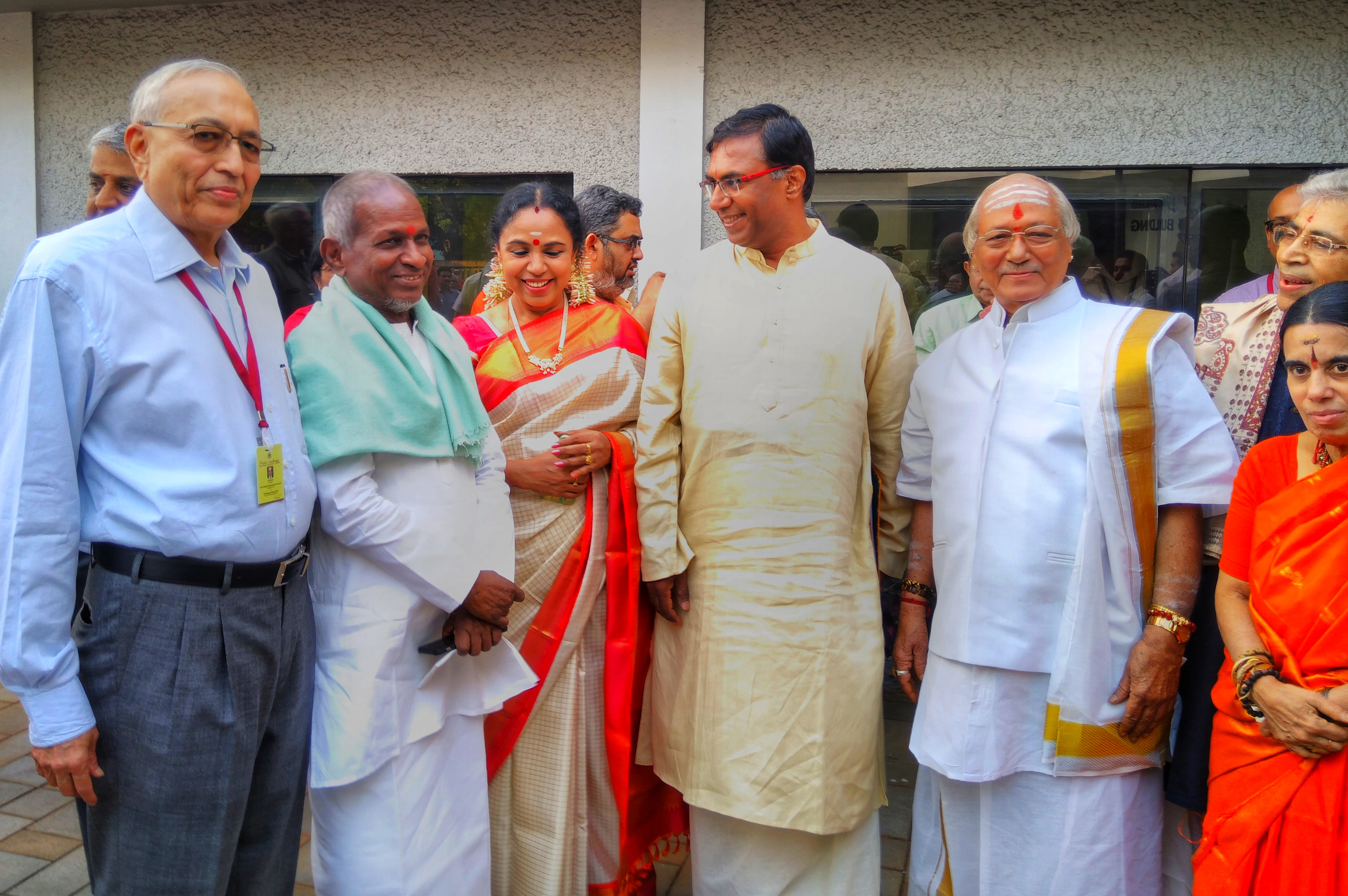
Ravikiran with A. Kanyakumari, Ilaiyaraaja, Sudha Ragunathan, T. V. Gopalakrishnan, and others

Ravikiran has created over 800 classical Indian and contemporary compositions. His Indian classical pieces include musical forms such as varnam, krti, javali, tillana and padam. He has created pieces in each of the 35-talas of Carnatic Music. as well as a 72-mela ragamalika geetam, a 13-part piece that spans over all the 72-parent ragas of Carnatic music in seven minutes.

He has created new ragas, including:

- Veetavanam in honour of Ludwig van Beethoven
- Mohini dedicated to Mahatma Gandhi
- Choodamani, created at age two and named after his mother
- Keshavapriya, Vaishnavi, Katyayani, Samapriya, Shivamanohari, and Andhakarini

Ravikiran has also set to music works of several azhwars, verses of Vedanta Desika, verses from ancient Tamil sangam literature, compositions of Purandara Dasa, D V Gundappa and a few contemporary composers.

In January 2016, Ravikiran composed music to 1330 tirukkural verses in 16 hours over 3 days at the International Institute of Tamil Studies, Taramani, Chennai.

=== Operas ===
Ravikiran has also written a number of internationally staged operas:

- Lakshmi Prabhavam
- Savithri
- Vinayaka Vaibhavam
- Ramayana - Bala Kandam
- Ramayana - Yuddha Kandam
- Mahabharata (Karna Shapatam and Geetopadesham)
- The Almighty Trinity, a production composed entirely in Telugu, highlighting the harmonious interactions between Brahma, Vishnu and Shiva.
- Panchakriya
- Panchali Shapatam

== Melharmony ==
Ravikiran is known for his concept of melharmony, which explores Western style harmony anchored on (Eastern style) melodic rules of evolved systems such as the raga system of Indian music. Melharmony is regarded as "a contemporary musical movement" with an aim to unify music systems of the world by taking into cognisance the rules and aesthetics of all fused systems in any given collaboration. Ravikiran introduced this award-winning concept during his collaboration with artists of the BBC Philharmonic, at the Millennium Festival, UK in October 2000.

Melharmony concerts with major orchestras like the Wisconsin Chamber Orchestra have attracted large audiences. The concept has inspired critical discussion among scholars in international conferences including Society for Music Theory Conference, Boston (2005) and Melody, Harmony, Melharmony conference, Houston (2014). Melharmony shows with school orchestras have given Western middle and high school children insights into how harmony can be centered on sophisticated rules of melody.

Ravikiran has also melharmonically rearranged and showcased the works of the great Masters in the twin-Composer series of festivals - OVK-Bach, Tyagaraja-Mozart and Dikshitar-Beethoven since 2013.

== Collaborations ==
Ravikiran has created music for Western Classical Symphony Orchestras, Chamber Orchestras, String Quartets as well as Caprices for solo violins. He has collaborated with artists of various genres such as Taj Mahal, Larry Coryell, Martin Simpson, George Brooks, Simon Phillips, Roland van Campenhout and orchestras such as BBC Philharmonic, Wisconsin Chamber Orchestra, Goettingen Quintet, Germany, Apollo Chamber Players, Houston, Middleton Community Symphony Orchestra and Sacramento Symphony.

Among Indian maestros, he has performed with Semmangudi Srinivasa Iyer, T. Brinda, Girija Devi, Pt Birju Maharaj, Dr M. Balamuralikrishna, Vishwa Mohan Bhatt, Dr N. Ramani, R. K. Srikanthan, Pt Kishan Maharaj, Nedunuri Krishnamurthy, Shashank Subramanyam Mandolin U Shrinivas and others.

== Philanthropy and advocacy ==
=== Arts educator ===
Ravikiran, is known for his large repertoire and for training a number of disciples around the world, many of whom are award-winning performers and teachers. His students have made contributions in other arenas. His disciples span a cross section of vocalists, violinists as well as exponents of flute, guitar, veena, keyboard in addition to the chitravina. He has performed and written about the 18th century composer Oothukkadu Venkata Kavi.

=== Planet Symphony ===
Ravikiran initiated the Planet Symphony Global Art-Science-Social Environmental initiative to raise awareness of the climate crisis. Within weeks the organisation had a global membership of over 2,300 from 65 countries including prominent musicians, scientists, journalists, NGOs and citizens and students. A mammoth Global production, “Climatrix Symphony — Planet Anthem” was released for climate action in which hundreds of Grammy and other international award-winning exponents and students of Classical, Jazz, Carnatic, Hindustan, folk and film music collectively recorded on an array of 50 instruments. The Planet Symphony also came up with original perspectives including Roof Greening as a means to attract and regulate rain in many regions. Their climate literacy programs have been successful, along with their concept of Smart Planet, which Ravikiran explained was to drive home the point that “The need of the hour is to be environmentally smart and not only electronically smart.”

=== Cultural ambassador ===
An active champion of culture, Ravikiran has performed extensively in both urban and rural schools & colleges across various countries. At age 20, he organised a symbolic non-stop 72-hour (which extended to almost 75 hours) concert for "world peace and prosperity" that brought together well-known performers of Carnatic music. He has also presented concerts for Social Harmony to highlight the unifying powers of art.

=== Rural music education projects ===
In 2006, Ravikiran pioneered an initiative for rural children in India with the largest music camp of its kind for over 31,000 children in Tamil Nadu, India for the Indian Government's Sarva Shiksha Abhyan.

=== Music in Schools & Universities in USA and India ===
A lobbyist for cultural renaissance in India, he was invited to provide syllabuses for Music Education in Schools in India for Grades I – VIII. In 2013, he introduced Indian music through Melharmonic creations for Middle and High School level orchestras in School Districts in USA such as Middleton & Sun Prairie, WI. A summer course on Melharmony was introduced at the Eastman School of Music in 2015, by Ravikiran and renowned American Composer-Musician Prof. Robert Morris.

He has introduced Carnatic music in several countries such as Slovakia, Croatia and Slovenia.

Ravikiran's concerts have raised substantial funds for disaster relief including Hurricane Katrina, Tsunami of 2004 as well as for educational, health and cultural initiatives.

=== Musicians Covid Relief Fund ===
Ravikiran set up the Musicians' Covid Relief Fund in 2020 to help numerous artists who were severely impacted by the pandemic. He got together Grammy and other Award-winning celebrities from Indian and Western Classical, Jazz and other systems to play fundraisers to support artists in distress through concerts such as the Dikshitar-Beethoven Melharmony Festival.

=== Other contributions ===
Some of Ravikiran's other contributions include:

- Introducing Indian music in a number of schools in India and USA
- Pioneering Twin Composer Celebrations such as Oottukkadu Venkata Kavi-J S Bach Festival and Tyagaraja-Mozart Festival in cities such as Madison and Chicago, USA
- Pioneering a vocal instrumental melodic ensemble, Vintage Virtuosos and a series of albums titled "Celestial Ragas".
- Introducing the portable, bright toned, 20-stringed slide instrument, Nava-chitravina
- Pioneering the use of teflon-slides in world music
- New perspectives on millennia old concepts such as "22 shrutis"
- Dance augmentation for instrumental concerts with dancer Smitha Madhav
- Introducing Tamil compositions to North Indian dance forms like Kathak & Odissi

== Author ==
Ravikiran has authored several books on Carnatic Music including

- Appreciating Carnatic Music
- Perfecting Carnatic Music Level I and II
- Life and Contributions of Oottukkadu Venkata Kavi
- Saptaratnas and Navavaranams of Oottukkadu Venkata Kavi
- Inaiyatra innishai (The incomparable music)

He has also penned a number of articles in journals and dailies.

== Awards ==
International

- The Millenium Festival Award, UK - 2000
- The New Age Voice Finalist Award, USA - 2001

National & State:

- Kalaimamani (Tamil Nadu State Award) – 1985
- Star of India (Wisdom International) – 1985
- Kumar Gandharva Samman (Madhya Pradesh State Award) – 1996

Artistic

- Nada Sudharnava – 1980
- Sangeeta Choodamani, Krishna Gana Sabha
- Vadya Ratnakara - Austin India Fine Arts
- Isai Peroli - Kartik Fine Arts
- Nada Sudharnava – 1980
- Sangeeta Kala Sarathy, Dec 2013 (Parthasarathy Swami Sabha), Chennai
- Chitravina Kala Praveena, Federation of Sabhas, Chennai
- Sangeetha Kalanidhi, The Music Academy, Madras, 2017

== Sexual harassment allegations ==
In connection with the Me Too movement, multiple claims that Ravikiran participated in workplace harassment of his students and subordinates surfaced. Ravikiran, in an interview with the India Times and on his Facebook account, strongly denied the allegations. Following these allegations, the Madras Music Academy dropped his concerts in the December Season 2018 music festival, along with six other musicians also accused. The Deccan Chronicle reported that a committee constituted by the Federation of City Sabhas in October 2018 did not receive complaints of sexual harassment from any performing artists. Ravikiran asserted that he has a "clean track record" and "substantial proof" of his innocence.
