= Ponneelan =

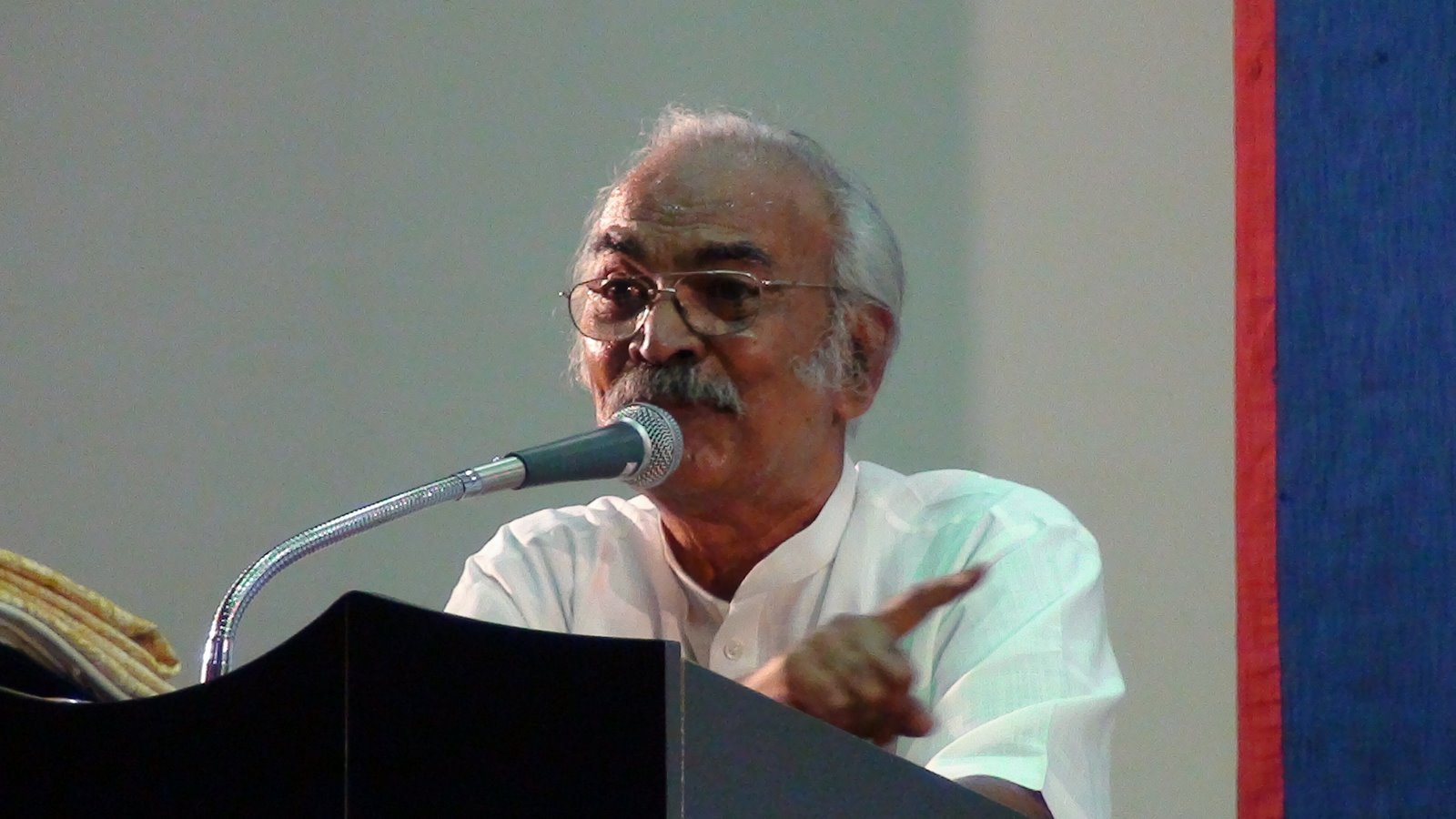
- Ponneelan in 2011
- Born: Kandeswara Bhaktavatsalan; 1940 (age 85–86); Manikatti Pottal, Kanyakumari District, Tamil Nadu, India
- Occupations: Writer, teacher
- Organization: Tamil Nadu Kalai Ilakkiya Perumandram
- Movement: Marxism
- Awards: Sahitya Akademi Award (1994)

Ponneelan, born 1940 at Manikatti Pottal, Kanyakumari district) is the pen name of Kandeswara Bhaktavatsalan, a Tamil writer from Tamil Nadu, India. He is a Marxist and was influenced by Tamil Communist leader P. Jeevanandham in his younger days. He became a teacher and retired as the deputy director of school education for Tamil Nadu. He won the 1994 Sahitya Akademi Award for Tamil his novel Pudhiya Dharisanangal. He is currently the state president of the Tamil literary organisation Tamil Nadu Kalai Ilakkiya Perumandram. During 2005–2008, he was a member of the Central Board of Film Certification (censor board). He also wrote the script for the 2008 film Ayyavazhi.

== Bibliography ==
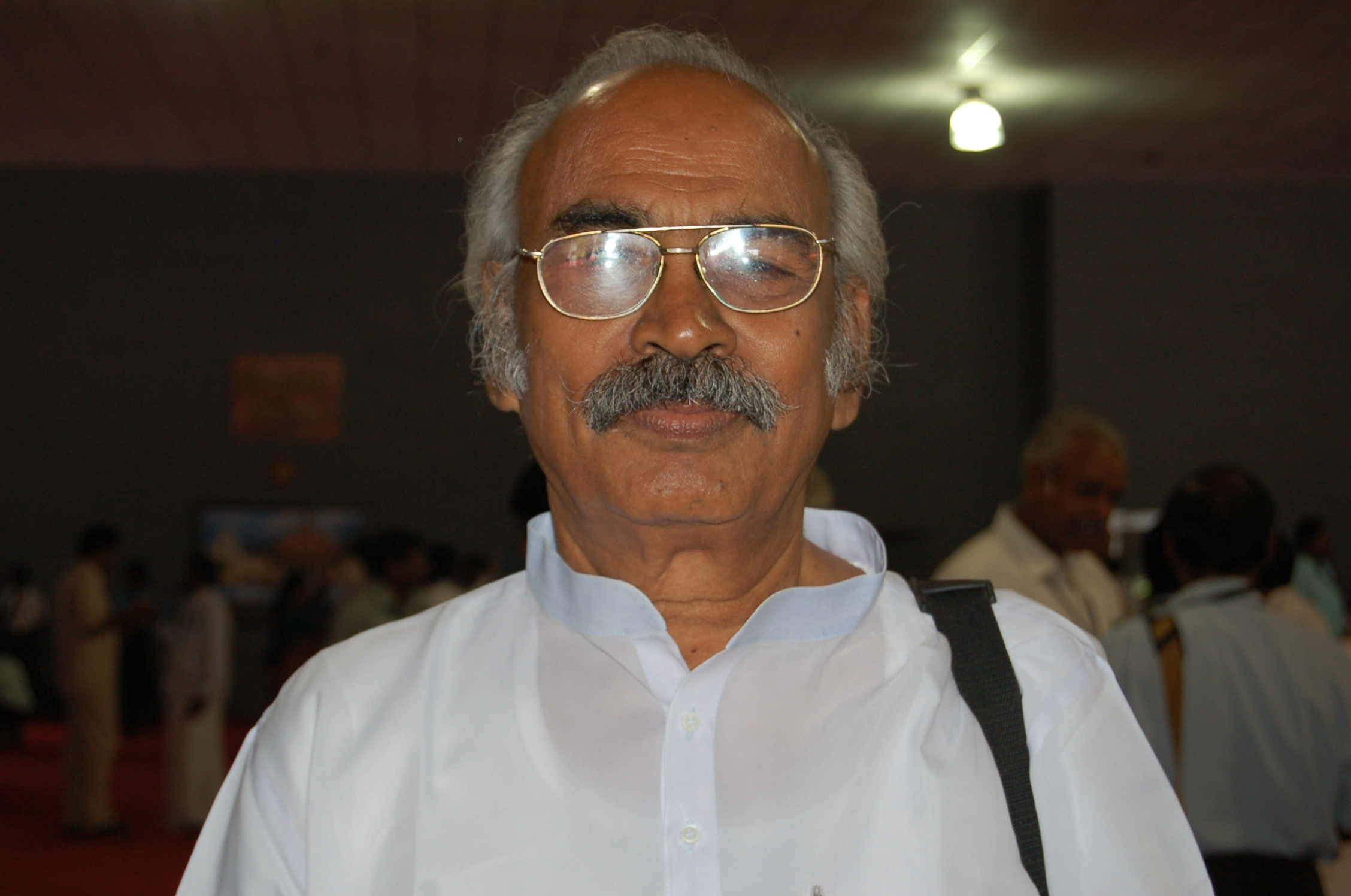
Ponneelan at the World Tamil Classical Language Conference, 2010

=== Fiction ===
Novels

- Karisal (1976)
- Pudhiya Dharisanangal (1992)
- Kollaikarargal
- Marupakkam (2010)

Short story anthologies

- Atthaani Makkal
- Pottal Kadhaigal
- Thedal
- Oorril malarndadhu
- Pudhiya mottugal
- Idam maari vantha vaergal
- Pullin kuzhanthaigal
- Uravugal
- Anbulla
- Nithyamanadhu
- Thirumanangal sorgathil nichayikka padukindrana

=== Non-fiction ===
Biographies

- Jeeva enra manudan
- Thamilagathin aanmeega vazhikaatti
- Ragunathanin ilakkiya thadam
- Therkilirundhu
- Vaikunthar kaattum vaazhkai neri

Essay anthologies

- Puvi engum santhi nilavuga
- Tharkala thamil ilakkiyamum dravida sidhathangalum
- Murpokku ilakkiya iyakkangal
- Sudhanthira thamilagathil kalai ilakkiya iyakkangal
- Sathi madhangalai paraom
- Thaimozhi kalvi
- Tamil nadu kalai ilakkiya perumandra varalaaru

== Awards and recognitions ==
- Sahitya Akademi Award for Tamil (1994)
- S. P. Adithanar Senior Tamil Scholar Award (2012)

== See also ==
- List of Sahitya Akademi Award winners for Tamil
- List of Indian writers
- List of Tamil-language writers
