= E. Sundaramoorthy =

Tamil scholar

- இ. சுந்தரமூர்த்தி
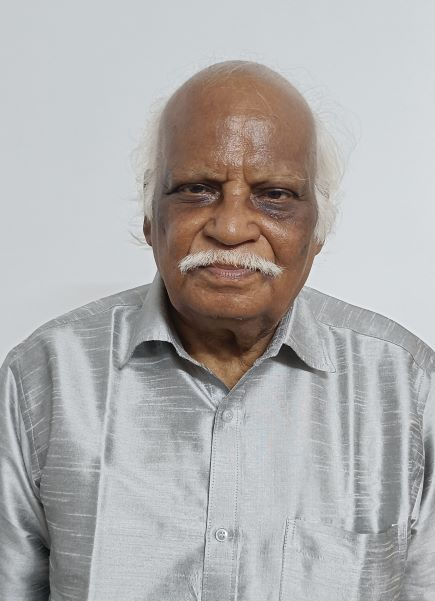

7th Vice-Chancellor of Tamil University, Thanjavur
- In office 19 December 2001 - 18 December 2004
- Chancellor(s): C. Rangarajan (2001-02); P. S. Ramamohan Rao (2002-04); Surjit Singh Barnala (2004-11)
- Preceded by: Kadir Mahadevan
- Succeeded by: C. Subramaniam

Personal details
- Born: 5 February 1942 Vellalur, Coimbatore district, Madras Province, British India (now Tamil Nadu, India)
- Died: 13 May 2026 (aged 84) Chennai, Tamil Nadu, India
- Workplace: University of Madras (? -2001)

E. Sundaramoorthy (5 February 1942 - 13 May 2026) was a Tamil scholar, professor and writer.

== Birth ==
He was born on 5 February 1942 in Vellalur in Coimbatore district, Tamil Nadu, India.

== Academic career ==
He worked in the departments of Tamil language, Tamil literature and publication of University of Madras in various capacities for 32 years. From December 19, 2001, to December 18, 2004, he was the Vice chancellor of Tamil University in Thanjavur. He worked in Central Institute of Classical Tamil from 2008 to 2014 as Senior Fellow. Now he is appointed as the Vice Chairperson of CICT.

== Works ==
He wrote more than 70 books on various subjects including manuscriptology, publishing, grammar, and stylistics and 260 articles. He got more than 20 awards including the Tirukkural Award from the Government of Tamil Nadu.

== Overseas trips ==
In connection with the Tamil research works he went to United States of America, Germany, Sri Lanka and Malaysia. He presented a research paper in the 10th World Tamil Conference held at Chicago, Illinois, USA.
