= Gottuvadyam =

String instrument

Chitraveena
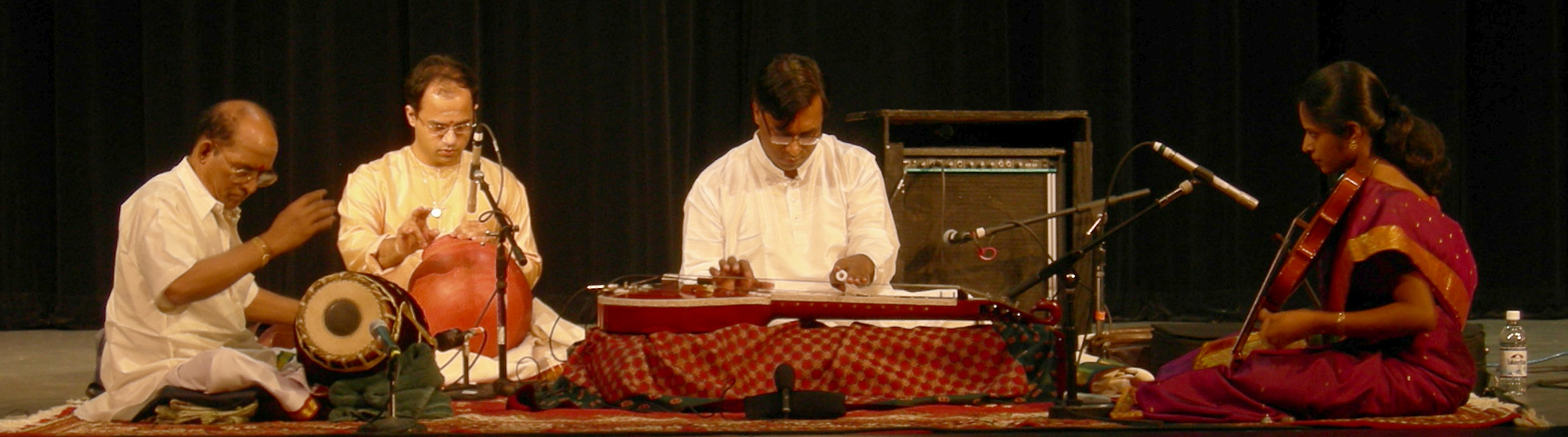
- N. Ravikiran (center) playing the navachitravina.

String instrument
- Other names: gottuvadyam, chitravina, chitra veena, chitraveena
- Classification: String instruments

Related instruments
- Vichitra veena; Sagar Veena; Surbahar; Rudra veena; Saraswati veena; Sarod; Sursingar; Tambura

The gottuvadyam is a 20 or 21-string fretless lute-style veena in Carnatic music from around the late 19th and early 20th centuries, named by Sakha Rama Rao from Tiruvidaimarudur, who was responsible for bringing it back to the concert scene.

It is also known as chitravina (Sanskrit: चित्रवीणा), chitra veena, chitraveena, chitra vina, hanumad vina and mahanataka vina.

Today it is played mainly in South India, though its origins can be traced back to Bharata's Natya Shastra (200 BCE-200 CE), where it is mentioned as a seven string fretless instrument. Sarangadeva (1210–47) also made a similar reference to the chitravina in his work, Sangita Ratnakara.

== Recent history ==
As a chitravina it was popularised in South India by Sakha Rama Rao before his disciple Gottuvadyam Narayana Iyengar (1903 - 1959), who was a palace musician of the erstwhile States of Travancore and Mysore took it to great heights. Iyengar's son, Chitravina Narasimhan (b. 1941) was instrumental in spreading his father's stringing and tuning methods as well as playing style.

== Construction and tuning ==
Since its first reference in the Natya Shastra, The chitravina has undergone numerous developments and is today shaped like the South Indian veena.

There are six main strings used for melody that pass over the top of the instrument, three drone strings and 11 or 12 sympathetic strings running parallel to and below the main strings. Among the more prominent solo instruments in Carnatic music, it is also seen in collaborative world music concerts and north-south Indian jugalbandis.

The chitravina is generally tuned to G sharp (5 and 1/2) and played with a slide like a Hawaiian steel guitar and the north Indian vichitra veena. The approach to tuning is similar to the sitar in the context of the 11-12 sympathetic resonance strings (from the low Pa to high Sa), similar to the Saraswati veena in the context of the three drone (tala) strings (Sa-Pa-Sa), but is unique in terms of the top-layer main playing six strings, which are configured as 3 tonic strings (sa), 2 fifth strings (pa) and 1 base tonic string (sa). The 3 and 2 include an octave string which gives the instrument a unique tone.

The fretless nature of the instrument, Narayana Iyengar's stringing methods have made its tone 'reminiscent of the human voice.'

== Playing technique ==
The index and middle fingers of the right hand are usually used with plectra to pluck the metal melody strings while a cylindrical block made out of hardwood (often ebony), buffalo horn, glass, steel, or teflon held by the left hand is used to slide along the strings to vary the pitch.

== Contemporary use ==
Narayana Iyengar's grandson Chitravina N. Ravikiran (b. 1967) plays the instrument and is the inventor of a variant, the navachitravina (which is typically tuned to B or C).

Other exponents of the instrument include Budaloor Krishnamurthy Shastri (1894 - 1978), A Narayana Iyer, Mannargudi Savithri Ammal, Allam Koteeshwara Rao (1933 -), M V Varahaswami, Allam Durgaprasad, Chitravina P Ganesh (b. 1976), Madhavachar, Kiranavali (Chitravina), Shashikiran, Gayatri Kassabaum, Lalitha Krishna, Vishaal Sapuram and Bhargavi Balasubramanian, Anahita Ravindran, Arjun Suresh. Seetha Doraiswamy, known more as a jala tarangam exponent, used to play the Balakokila, a smaller version of the chitravina.
