= Chitravina Narasimhan =

Chitravina Narasimhan (born 1941) is a gottuvadhyam player from India. He is the father of chitravina player N. Ravikiran.

== Early life ==
He was born in 1941 in Mysore, Karnataka in a family of musicians. His father Gottuvadhyam Narayan Iyengar, who was also his teacher was a renowned Gottuvadhyam player in South India.

== Career ==
After learning from his father he continued his training in Gottuvadhyam under several musicians such as T. Brinda, G.N Balabsuramaniam, Budaloor Krishnamurthi Shastri and Musiri Subramaniam Iyer. Narasimhan performed extensively across India and won acclaim from many stalwarts of Indian music including such as Ariyakudi Ramanuja Iyengar, Allauddin Khan (mentor of sitarist Ravishankar), Flute Mali, M. Balalmuralikrishna, and Veena S. Balachander. His musical achievements were also appreciated by Prime Ministers Jawaharlal Nehru, Lal Bahadur Shastri and Indira Gandhi, and President Dr. Radhakrishnan, besides a number of films and cultural personalities.

== Family and students ==
He has three children. All of them are renowned musicians - sons N. Ravikiran, K N Shashikiran, daughter Kiranavali Vidyasankar. Narasimhan’s nephew Chitravina Ganesh was also mentored by him from childhood.

His other students include vocalist T K Ramachandran, Vanitha Suresh and Veena Sambasivam.
