= Narayan Iyengar =

K. S. Narayana Iyengar (25 January 1903 – 11 January 1959) was a master Indian Carnatic musician of the South Indian instrument, the chitravina (also known as the gotuvadyam). He contributed heavily to the development of the instrument.

Narayana Iyengar was a friend of film director A. V. Meiyappan. Together they operated a gramophone record store in Madras in 1932.

On 2 October 1939, the Malaya Tribune wrote:

"The highest flights of ecstasy to which Carnatic music can raise were revealed by the performance on the famous gotuvadyam by Professor Narayana Iyengar at the Town Hall of Kuala Lumpur. The extent of the profound effects he has produced on the audience numbering nearly a thousand can be gauged from the fact that he was able to hold them spell-bound for over 3 hours, whereas it would be considered a remarkable achievement if a million dollar film could do the same for just over an hour."
