= International Institute of Tamil Studies =

Indian research institute

- உலகத் தமிழாராய்ச்சி நிறுவனம் Ulakat Tamiḻārāycci Niṟuvaṉam
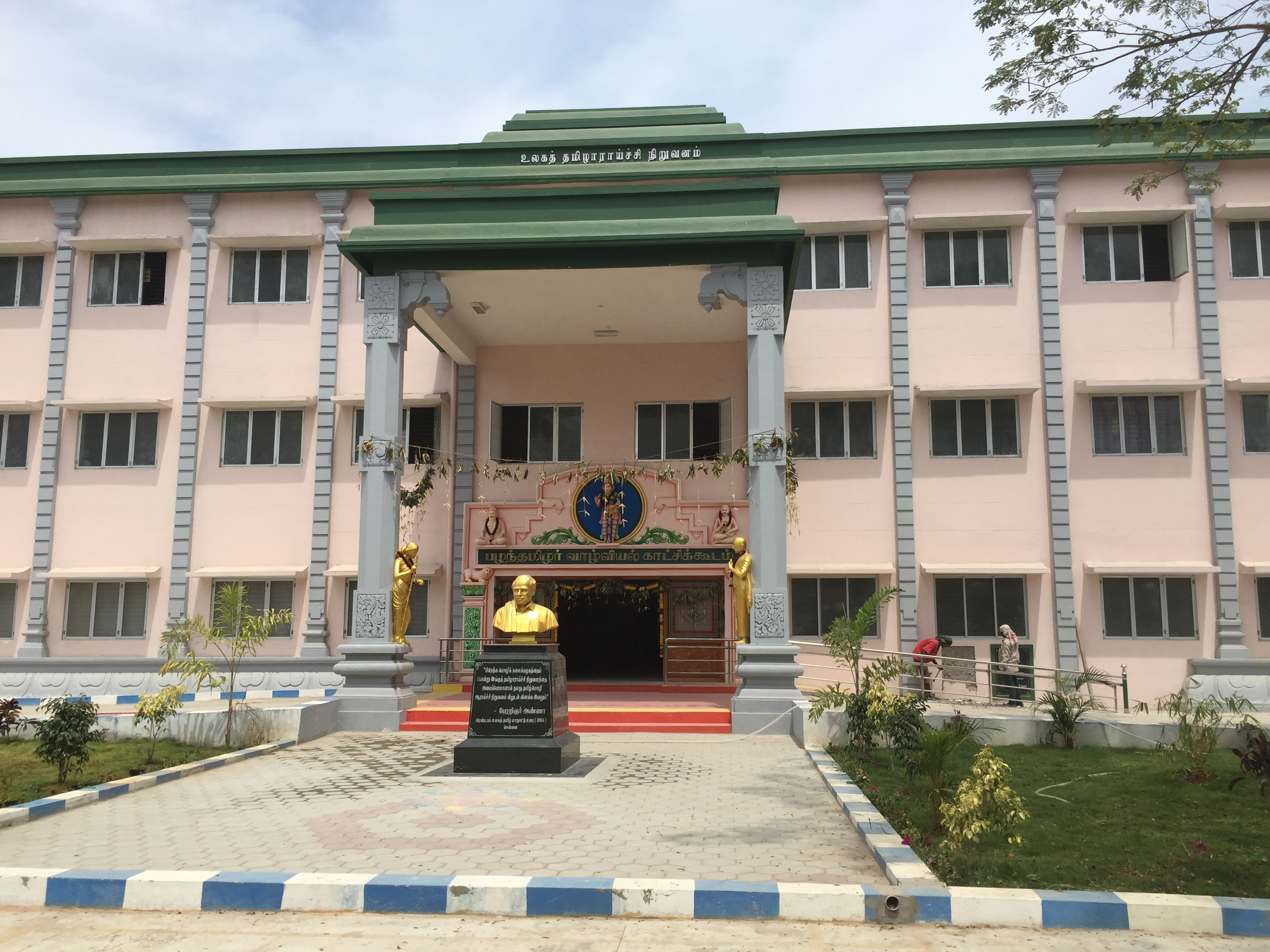
- Facade of the new building at the International Institute of Tamil studies
- Motto: யாதும் ஊரே யாவரும் கேளிர் Yātum ūrē; yāvarum kēḷir
- Motto in English: Every place is our home; all people are our kin
- Established: 1970
- Director: Gopinath stalin
- Location: 2nd Main Road, CIT Campus, TTTI Post, Taramani, Chennai, Tamil Nadu, 600113, India
- Campus: Taramani
- Language: Tamil
- Website: www.ulakaththamizh.in

The International Institute of Tamil Studies (IITS) is a linguistic research institution based in Chennai, Tamil Nadu, India. It was established with a view to promoting the cause of the Tamil language.

== History ==
The International Institute of Tamil Studies was established in 1970 for Tamil research. In 2014, the then directors Vijayaraghavan and Manavazhagan proposed setting up a cultural center with permanent exhibition to recreate the history of Tamils unraveled by decades of research, and the government approved it in September the same year. The center was opened to the public in a new building in March 2016.

== Infrastructure ==
The center has a theatre, which films short eight-to-nine-minute documentaries showcasing photographs, dramatic recreations, videos, film clippings and pictures of sculptures/murals from temples. The museum is entirely based on Tamil literature. It exhibits paintings on Sangam literature, wood and cement reproductions of artefacts found in various parts of the state, photographs of collections in various other museums, replicas of weapons and implements, and replicas of ancient towns and temples. There are also dioramic representations that speak about how kings observed the rules of war, treated subjects rendering justice, and ensured fair-play and compassion to all creatures.

The exhibits are arranged in five galleries:

- "Tholkappiar Arangam" displaying art forms;
- "Thiruvalluvar Arangam" with exhibits of metalcraft/agriculture, education, medicine and weapons;
- "Kapilar Arangam" with a collection of home tools/grinders and exhibits on temples and gods;
- "Avvaiyar Arangam" with lifelike depictions of well-known events in the life of ancient kings;
- "Ilango Adigal gallery" with exhibits on shipbuilding and sail-weaving, for which ancient Tamils were well known.

There are also scale-models of the cities of Madurai and Thiruvarangam, highlighting the meticulous city-planning and temple-building artistry found in these cities.

== See also ==
- Central Institute of Classical Tamil
