= Thiagarajar College =

Government-aided College of Arts and Science in Madurai

Coordinates: 9°54′46.57″N 78°8′51.13″E

Location
- 139/140 Kamarajar salai Madurai, Tamil Nadu, 625009; India

Information
- School type: Public
- Established: 1949
- Founder: Shri.Kalaithanthai Karumuttu Thiagarajan
- President: Mr. Karumuttu T. Kannan.Hari Thiagarajan
- Principal: Dr. D. Pandiaraja
- Affiliation: Madurai Kamaraj University
- Website: tcarts.in

Thiagarajar College is an autonomous government-aided college located in Madurai, Tamil Nadu, India. It is affiliated with Madurai Kamaraj University and is ranked 15th among colleges in India by the National Institutional Ranking Framework (NIRF) in 2024.

== Location ==
It is located on Kamarajar road, opposite of Mariamman Temple pond, Vandiyur.

== History ==
The college was established in 1949 by Kalaithanthai Karumuttu Thiagarajan Chettiar, a 20th-century South Indian philanthropist. The college was formally declared open by the Krishna Kumarsinhji Bhavsinhji, Maharaja of Bhavnagar, the then Governor of Madras, on 12 October 1949. Its mission is to provide quality higher education to the rural masses to realize the vision of Mahatma Gandhi. The college was originally affiliated to the Madras University, for undergraduate degrees in arts and science streams. In 1960, the state government's proposed acquisition of land for the college's expansion became the subject of correspondence between Madras minister C. Subramaniam and Prime Minister Jawaharlal Nehru, with A.S. Subbaraj (A. S. Subbaraj), a local MLA whose family owned a portion of the land mentioned.

College rankings

General – India
- NIRF (Colleges) (2023): 18

== Academics ==
The college currently provides 9 Ph.D., 11 M.Phil., 15 post-graduates, 24 undergraduates, 11 diploma and 13 certificate, educational programmes affiliated with Madurai Kamaraj University. The college is currently managed by the Kalaithanthai Karumuttu Thiagarajan Chettiar Memorial Trust.
