= Puthuvai Ratnathurai =

Sri Lankan poet, songwriter and sculptor

- Varathalingam Ratnathurai
- Born: December 3, 1948 (age 77); Puttur, Jaffna district, Sri Lanka
- Occupations: Poet, Sculptor
- Writing career
- Pen name: Vyasan and Malika
- Language: Tamil
- Genre: Tamil nationalism

Varathalingam Rathnathurai (commonly known as Puthuvai Ratnathurai) is a poet, songwriter and sculptor who served as the head of Arts and Culture Division of the Liberation Tigers of Tamil Eelam (LTTE), a separatist Tamil militant organisation in Sri Lanka. He is a known personality among Eelam Tamils and has written many revolutionary songs and poetry for the LTTE. He disappeared after the end of the Sri Lankan Civil War in 2009.

Ratnathurai headed the Tamil Eelam Arts and Cultural Guild during the LTTE's de facto administration of northern Sri Lanka. On May 21, 2016, the Tamil Guardian reported that he was last seen in the custody of the Sri Lankan military on May 18, 2009, in Mullivaikkal. In 2012, Sinhala daily newspaper Divaina reported that he is in the custody of the Sri Lankan Army.This has not been confirmed by the Sri Lankan Army.

Ratnathurai began writing Tamil poetry at the age of 14. He also wrote many poems under the pseudonyms Vyasan and Malika. He wrote, Inda Maan Mukum Naman Maan which is a sentimental song that has been well received by many people. He is a native of Puttur, Jaffna district.

In September 2014, the Sri Lanka Army banned Piddukku ma’n chumantha perumaanaar, a devotional song authored by Ratnathurai.

== Early life ==
Hailing from a Vishwakarma community in Puttur in Jaffna, Ratnathurai was the second child of Kandiah Varathalingam, a sculptor hailing from Thirunelveli in Jaffna, and his wife Pakkiyam.

== Books ==
- Vān̲am civakkir̲atu (in Tamil). Yāl̲ppāṇam Cutājin̲i Veḷiyīṭu. 1970.
- Poems By Puthuvai Ratnathurai. Nankkoorum. 2005.
- வானம் சிவக்கிறது (1970)
- இரத்த புஷ்பங்கள்(1980)
- ஒரு தோழனின் காதற் கடிதம்
- நினைவழியா நாட்கள்
- உலைக்களம்
- பூவரசம் வேலியும் புலுனிக் குஞ்சுகளும்
- Ulaikalam, 2009

== English Translations ==
Some of his poems were translated into English by renowned Canadian Tamil academic Professor Chelva Kanaganayakam as part of a book titled "Wilting Laughter: Three Tamil Poets":

- December, a Thing of Beauty
- Beauty Unseen
- Writing the Remnants of a Dream
- A Poet's Fearless Death
- An Elegy for a Teacher
- The Temple Across the Field
- Waiting
- Crescent Moon
- Those Days Were Beautiful
- Yearning
- The Frolicking Clouds
- Resurgent Dawn and a Restless Poet
- The Sculptor and the Statue
- Moving River
- Silenced, the Temple Bells
- The Poet, the Wind, and the Flowers
- On the Third Day After the Festival
- Fulfilment
- Grant Me a Wish
- Three Questions
- Relationship
- Beauty and the Sea
- Bright Even in the Night
- Our Folks Are Not Ungrateful
- Where Snow Falls
