= B. Jeyamohan =

Indian author (born 1962)

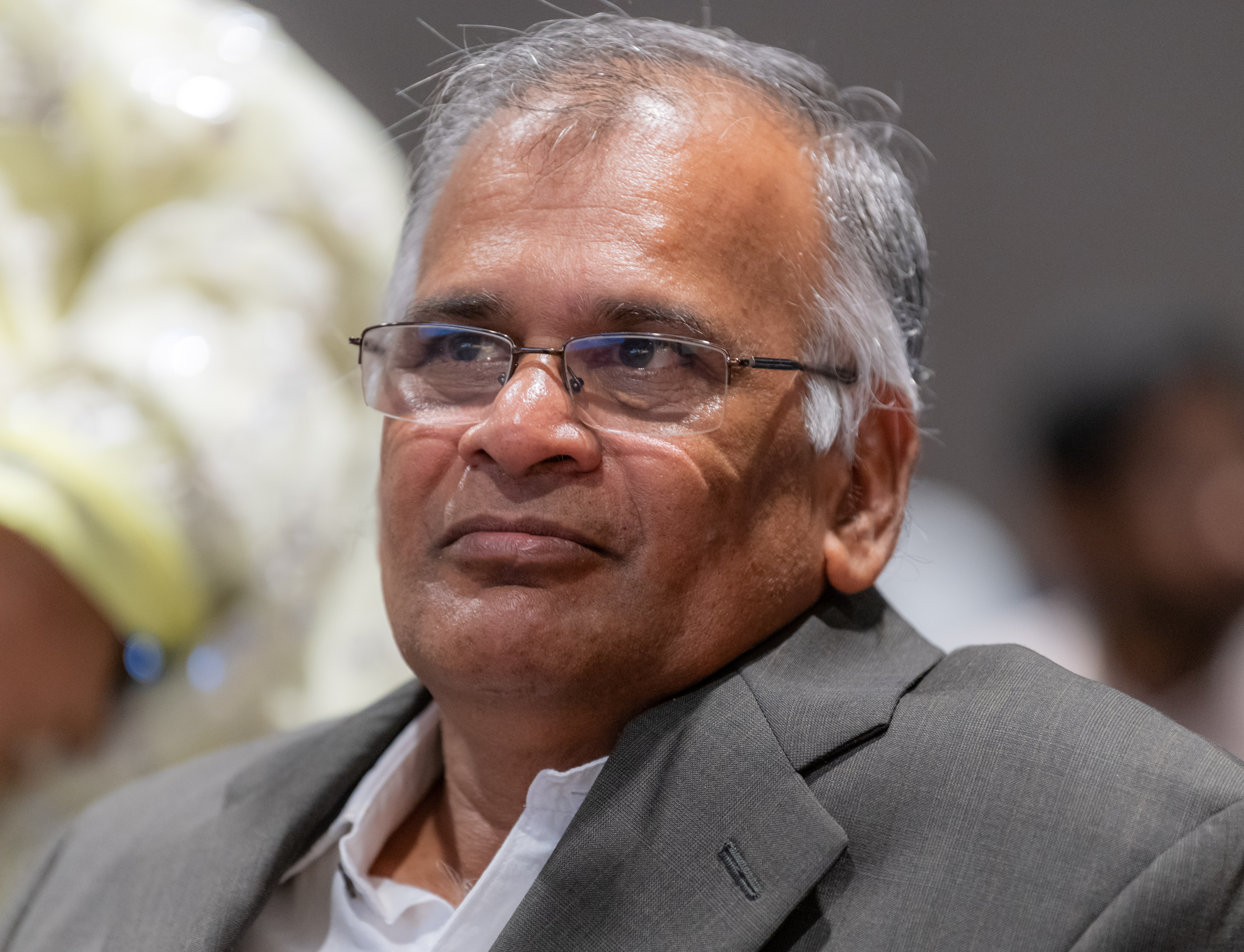
- Jeyamohan in September 2022
- Born: 22 April 1962 (age 64); Thiruvarambu, Kanyakumari district, Tamil Nadu, India
- Occupations: Writer; novelist; critic
- Spouse: Arunmozhi Nangai (m. 1991)
- Children: 2
- Writing career
- Language: Tamil, Malayalam
- Period: 1985–present
- Subjects: Literature; philosophy
- Notable works: Venmurasu; Kotravai
- Website: jeyamohan.in

Bahuleyan Jeyamohan (born 22 April 1962) is an Indian Tamil and Malayalam language writer and literary critic from Nagercoil in the Indian state of Tamil Nadu.

His best-known and most critically acclaimed work is Vishnupuram, a fantasy set as a quest through various schools of Indian philosophy and mythology. In 2014, he started his most ambitious work Venmurasu, a modern re-narration of the epic Mahabharata and successfully completed the same, thus creating the world's longest novel ever written.

His other well-known novels include Rubber, Pin Thodarum Nizhalin Kural, Kanyakumari, Kaadu, Pani Manithan, Eazhaam Ulagam and Kotravai. The early major influences in his life have been the humanitarian thinkers Leo Tolstoy and Mohandas Karamchand Gandhi. Drawing on the strength of his life experiences and extensive travel around India, Jeyamohan is able to re-examine and interpret the essence of India's rich literary and classical traditions.

Born into a Malayali Nair family in the Kanyakumari district that straddles Tamil Nadu and Kerala, Jeyamohan is equally adept in Tamil and Malayalam. However, the bulk of his work has been in Tamil. Jeyamohan's output includes nine novels, ten volumes of short-stories/plays, thirteen literary criticisms, five biographies of writers, six introductions to Indian and Western literature, three volumes on Hindu and Christian philosophy and numerous other translations and collections. He has also written scripts for Malayalam and Tamil movies.

== Personal life ==
Jeyamohan was introduced to Arunmozhi Nangai as a reader and married her in 1991. Their son Ajithan was born in 1993 and daughter Chaitanya in 1997.

== Early life ==
Jeyamohan was born on 22 April 1962 in Thiruvarambu of Kanyakumari District, Tamil Nadu, to S.Bahuleyan Pillai and B.Visalakshi Amma. Bahuleyan Pillai was an accounts clerk in the Arumanai registrar's office. Visalakshi Amma hailed from a family of trade-unionists. Jeyamohan's siblings were an elder brother and a younger sister. Bahuleyan's family followed him around on his work-related transfers to Thiruvattar and Arumanai towns in the Kanyakumari district.

Very early on, Jeyamohan was inspired by his mother to take up writing. Jeyamohan's first publication during schooldays was in Ratnabala, a children's magazine, followed by a host of publications in popular weeklies. After high school, Jeyamohan was pressured by his father to take up commerce and accountancy in college. The suicide of a close friend drove him to drop out of college and constantly travel the country in search of physical and spiritual experience. He supported himself by taking up odd jobs and writing in pulp magazines all the while reading voraciously. He took up a temporary job at the Telephones department in Kasaragod where he became close to the Leftist trade union circles. He received many of his formative ideas on historiography and literary narrative during that period.

Visalakshi and Bahuleyan committed suicide within a month of each other in 1984, and this drove Jeyamohan further into an itinerant lifestyle. He met writer Sundara Ramasamy in 1985 who took on the role of a mentor and encouraged him to take up writing seriously. Jeyamohan also got another mentor in the form of Aattoor Ravi Varma who sensitised him to the delicate balance between art and life. In parallel, Jeyamohan was an avid reader of Indian classics and philosophical texts like the Bhagavad Gita.

== Career ==
=== Fiction & literary criticism ===
In 1987, the journal Kollippaavai published his poem Kaidhi (The Prisoner). In the same year, Nadhi (The River) was published in Kanaiyazhi with a critical mention from writer Ashoka Mitran. The journal Nigazh published Bodhi, followed by Padugai ('The Riverbed'). Critics heaped praise on Padugai for its evocative narrative that wove together myths and contemporary visuals. Jeyamohan wrote his first full-fledged novel Rubber in 1988 and then re-edited and published it in 1990.

The novel won the Akilan Memorial prize for its path-breaking portrayal of the ecological and sociological impact of rubber cultivation in the South Indian states of Kerala and Tamil Nadu. Jeyamohan's speech at the awards function was well received, and he further developed those ideas in Novel (1990), an exploration of the art form and its ideologies, and Naveena Thamizhilakkiya Arimugam, a comprehensive introduction to modernist Tamil literature.

In 1993, Jeyamohan met Guru Nitya Chaitanya Yati which proved to be a turning point in his spiritual journey. The dialogues with the Guru opened new views into the body of Indian thought, which culminated in his acclaimed work Vishnupuram in 1997. Jeyamohan travelled and witnessed first-hand regional issues, droughts and political problems that underlay issues like Naxalism in tribal areas. His experiences convinced him of the continuing relevance of Gandhian idealism and non-violence as the sensible alternative to naked capitalism and militant socialism. The leftist in him had been saddened by the collapse of the Soviet Union in 1991, and a decade long introspection on the nature of power and self-righteousness found expression in Pin Thodarum Nizhalin Kural in 1999.

Post-2000, Jeyamohan broke new ground with Kaadu (2003), an exploration of the forest landscape as a metaphor for lust and the vigour of life. Kotravai (2005), the renarration of the Kannagi epic, was deemed by the writer and critics as his best yet in terms of structure and depth.

From 1998 to 2004, Jeyamohan and his friends edited a literary journal named Solputhithu. In 2009, his readership circle created the 'Vishnupuram Ilakkiya Vattam' to broaden the readership for serious literature in Tamil Nadu and to reward under-recognised pioneers of Tamil literature.

When he turned 50, Jeyamohan wrote a set of short-stories, titled 'Aram', that explored the values and idealism that is possible in man. In 2014, Jeyamohan began writing Venmurasu, a re-narration of the Indian epic Mahabharata.

In parallel, Jeyamohan has produced extenisive body of work as a prominent literary critic and theorist of modern Indian literature with a focus on Tamil literature. among critics like Vedasagayakumar. In 2013, he was recognized as Tamil Author of the Year by National Library, Singapore. In 2016, he worked as Writer in residence for 2 months at Nanyang Technological University, Singapore, organised by National Arts Council (Singapore) and National Institute of Education.

=== Website ===
Jeyamohan had been an active participant in Tamil internet discussion groups like Mayyam, Forumhub and Thinnai.com during the early years of the medium India. As part of the debates, Jeyamohan produced some of his best essays on literary standards and criticism during this period. Recognising the possibility of losing some of these important works, Jeyamohan's friend and writer Cyril Alex created the author's website for consolidating the author's works. Over the decade, the website has become an important repository of the author's essays running into thousands.

=== Environmentalism ===
Jeyamohan's works like 'Kaadu' and 'Mathagam' feature elephants in central roles, while his biographical and travel essays capture the centrality of nature, ecology and conservation to the Indian way of life. One such true-life story on the conservationist Dr.V. Krishnamurthy (veterinarian) ('Dr K, the Elephant Doctor') sparked huge interest and discussion among readers on the impact of humans on forest life. Told in semi-fictional form as through the eyes of a forest ranger, the story follows Dr K as, despite having a giant reputation in the naturalist circles, he eschews human accolades and seeks a much more rewarding life in the company of animals in the Indian Forest Department's elephant camps. 'The Elephant Doctor' has been included in the Tamil textbook published by the Department of School Education, Tamil Nadu as part of the revised syllabus for the year 2018.

== Bibliography ==
=== Fiction ===
Novels

- Rubber (1990)
- Vishnupuram (1997)
- Pin Thodarum Nizhalin Kural (1999), inspired by the rise and fall of Nikolai Bukharin, a contemporary examination of power, purpose and morals/righteousness
- Kanyakumari (2000)
- Kaadu (2003) (translated into English as The Forest by Janaki Venkatraman)
- Eazhaam Ulagam (2003)
- Anal Kaatru (2009)
- Iravu (2010)
- Ulogam (2010), The Metal, analysing the psyche of an assassin
- Kanninilam
- Vellai Yanai (2013) – Fictionalised account of first labour movement of India in the backdrop of Casteism, British Rule and the Madras Famine
- Ashokavanam (in progress)

Epics

- Kotravai (2005) – The Goddess of the Paalai land, a re-interpretation of the Tamil epic Silappadhikaram
- Venmurasu – Novel series based on Mahabharata
  - Mudharkanal – Published online January–February 2014
  - Mazhaippadal – Published online March–May 2014
  - Vannkkadal – Published online June to August 2014.
  - Neelam – Published online August to September 2014
  - Prayagai – Published online October 2014 to January 2015
  - Venmugil Nagaram – Published online February to May 2015
  - Indraneelam – Published online June to August 2015
  - Kaandeepam – Published online September to November 2015
  - Veiyon – Published online December 2015 to early March 2016
  - Panniru Padaikkalam – Published online March 2016, to June 2016
  - Solvalar Kaadu – Published online July 2016 to September 2016
  - Kiratham – Published online October 2016 to January 2017
  - Maamalar – Published online February 2017 to May 2017
  - Neerkolam – Published online May 2017 to August 2017
  - Ezhuthazhal – Published online September 2017 to December 2017
  - Kuruthichaaral – Published online December 2017 to March 2018
  - Imaikkanam – Published online March 2018 to May 2018
  - Sennaa Vaengai – Published online from June 2018 to August 2018
  - Thisaither Vellam – Published online from Sept 2018 to Nov 2018
  - Kaarkadal – Published online from Dec 2018 to March 2019
  - Irutkani – Published online from April 2019 to June 2019
  - Theein Edai – Published online from April 2019 to June 2019
  - Neerchudar – Published online from July 2019 to August 2019
  - kalitriyaanai Nirai – Published online from December 2019 to February 2020
  - kalporu sirunurai – Published online from March 2020 to June 2020
  - Muthalaavin – Published online from 1 July 2020 to 2 July 2020

Short Story Collections

- Thisaigalin Naduvey (1992)
- Mann (1993)
- Aayirangaal Mandabam (meaning: A thousand pillared Mantap), 1998
- Koondhal (2003)
- Jeyamohan Sirukathaigal (2004)
- Jeyamohan Kurunovelgal (2004), Novellas
- Nizhalvelikkadhaigal (2005), also titled as Devadhaikadhaigalum Peikkadhaigalum
- Visumbu (2006), science fiction stories
- Oomaichennaai (2008)
- Aram (2011)
- Eeraaru Kaalkondezhum Puravi
- Venkadal

Plays

- Vadakkumugam (2004)

Children's literature

- Pani Manidhan (2002), The Ice Man (Yeti)

=== Non-fiction ===
Literary criticism

- Novel (1992)
- Tharkaala Malayala Kavidhaigal (1992), on contemporary Malayalam poetry
- Asokamithran Arubathandu Niraivuvizha malar (1993), souvenir volume for writer Asokamithran's sixtieth birthday celebrations
- Sundara Ramasami Niraivuvizha malar (1994), souvenir volume for writer Sundara Ramasami's sixtieth birthday celebrations
- Naveena Thamizhilakkiya Arimugam (1998), an introduction to modern Tamil literature
- Naveenathuvathirku pin Thamizh kavidhai (1999), Post-modern Tamil poetry, with focus on Poet Devadevan
- Sanga Chittirangal, vignettes from Tamil Sangam poems
- Munsuvadugal
- Merku Chaalaram, introduction to Western literature
- Indraya Malayala Kavidhaigal (2002), on contemporary Malayalam poetry
- Nedumpathaiyoram (2002), translated compilation of editorials originally published in the Malayalam publications Mathrubhumi and Bashaboshini
- Ilakkiya Munnodigal Varisai (2003), a collection of seven volumes on pioneering modern Tamil litterateurs
- Ullunarvin Thadathil (2004)
- Samakaala Malayala Kavidhaigal (2005), on contemporary Malayalam poetry
- Ilakkiya Uraiyaadalgal Pettigal (2005), interviews and dialogues with modern Tamil writers
- Aazhnathiyai Thedi (2006)
- Eezha Ilakkiyam Oru Vimarsana Paarvai (2006), criticism of Eelam literature
- Kanneerai Pinthodardhal (2006) – Following the trail of tears, a review of 22 Indian novels
- Kamandala Nadhi – Nanjilnadan Padaippulagam (2007) – on Tamil writer Nanjil Nadan
- Ezhudhum Kalai (2008) – The art of writing
- Puthiya Kaalam (2009)
- Kadaitheruvin Kalaignan (2010) – on Tamil writer A Madhavan
- Pookkum Karuvelam — Poomaniyin Padaippulagam (2011) – on writer Poomani
- Oliyalaanadhu — Devadevanin Padaippulagam (2012) – on poet Devadevan
- Ezhudhiyavanai Kandupidithal — Ilakkiya Vivadha Katturaigal

Philosophy/Spirituality

- Hindu Gnana Marabil Aaru Dharisanangal (2002), the six visions of Hinduism
- Indhiya Gnanam (2008)
- Siluvayin Peyaraal, In the Name of the Cross, discourse on Jesus Christ the philosopher
- Hindu Madham: Sila Vivadhangal

Politics

- Saatchi Mozhi (2008), discourses on politics
- Indraya Gandhi (2009), treatise on the continuing relevance of Gandhi and Gandhian principles
- Anna Hazare (2011), (Collection of essays describing Anna Hazare's Gandhian philosophy and fight against corruption)

Culture

- Pannpadudhal
- Thannuraigal
- Kodungollur Kannagi (2005), on the cult of Kannagi – translated from Malayalam
- Ethirmugam (2006), collection of debates on the Internet 2000–2006

Memoirs/biographies

- Su.Ra Ninaivin Nathiyil – on his mentor Sundara Ramasami
- Logi (Logithadas Ninaivu) (2008) – on Malayalam filmmaker Lohithadas

Life/experience

- Vaazhvile Oru Murai
- Nigazhdhal Anubavak Kurippugal (2007)
- Je Chaitanyavin Sinthanai Marabu (2007)
- Indru Petravai (2008), Notes from the diary
- Naalum Pozhudhum
- Ivargal Irundhargal
- Purappadu (2013)

Travels

- Pulveli Desam (2008), Grasslands, travels in Australia
- Mugangalin Desam (2017), travels in India

General

- Nalam – essays on health (2008)

Malayalam

- Nedumpathaiyoram (2002)
- Uravidangal
- Nooru Simhasanangal
- Aana Doctor

=== Film/screenwriting ===
Jeyamohan has collaborated with filmmakers in Tamil and Malayalam and shares credits for story, screenplay and dialogues.

Tamil

- Kasthuri Maan (2005)
- Naan Kadavul (2009)
- Angadi Theru (2010)
- Neerparavai (2012)
- Kadal (2013)
- 6 Mezhuguvarthigal (2013)
- Kaaviya Thalaivan (2014)
- Papanasam (2015)
- Yemaali (2018)
- 2.0 (2018)
- Sarkar (2018)
- Vendhu Thanindhathu Kaadu (2022)
- Ponniyin Selvan: I (2022)
- Viduthalai Part 1 (2023)
- Ponniyin Selvan: II (2023)
- Indian 2 (2024)

Malayalam

- Ozhimuri (2012)
- Kaanchi (2013)
- 1 By Two (2014)
- Naku Penda Naku Taka (2014)

Kannada

- Dhehi (2018)

=== Web series ===
- Goli Soda Rising (2024)

== Awards ==
- Akilan Memorial Prize (1990)
- Katha Samman (1992)
- Sanskriti Sammaan (1994)
- Paavalar Virudhu from Isaignani Ilayaraja Ilakkiya Peravai (2008)
- Mugam award for 'Aram' collection
- Fiction award for 'Kotravai' from The Tamil Literary Garden (2009)
- Kerala Film Critics Association award for Best Scriptwriter for Ozhimuri (2012)
- T A Shahid Memorial award (2012) for Best Scriptwriter for Ozhimuri
- Kannadhasan award from Kovai Kannadasan Kazhagam (2014)
- Iyal award from The Tamil Literary Garden for 2014 (presented 2015)
- Refused to accept the Padmashree award from Government of India (2016) on the grounds preserving his integrity
- A translation of his short story (Periyamma's words) was awarded 2017 Close Approximations Fiction Prize from critically acclaimed Asymptote
- Lifetime achievement award, Codissia Book Festival (Coimbatore) – 2017

== Political views and writing ==
In the late 1970s, Jeyamohan was associated with the Rashtriya Swayamsevak Sangh (RSS), later becoming part of its ideological pool. He used to write articles for Vijayabharatham, a mouthpiece of RSS in Tamil, under the names Jayan and Rajan. By the mid-1980s he distanced himself from the organisation for spiritual and political reasons.

In the 2014 Indian general election, Jeyamohan extended his support to the Aam Aadmi Party (AAP), particularly for S.P. Udayakumar, an anti-nuclear activist, who was the AAP candidate from Kanyakumari constituency.

=== Gandhian movements & Anna Hazare ===
Jeyamohan gravitated towards Gandhian philosophy and political principles through debates with many intellectuals of the era. His considerable writing resulted in the corpus of essays published in 2009 as Indraya Gandhi, a collection that examined the continuing relevance of Gandhi's methods and ideals in modern India. Indraya Gandhi explored new dimensions on Gandhi's life including his relationship with Nehru, Ambedkar and Dalit politics and the topic of Lust. Jeyamohan has continued to highlight many Gandhians who represent the philosophy.

As a part of the series, he sought to explain how the next generation of Gandhian leaders like Anna Hazare were continuing to inspire the nation towards achieving true democracy and equality. Jeyamohan had been one of the first Indian ideologues to write about Anna Hazare many years before Anna Hazare's popular anti-graft movement. Jeyamohan had personally visited Ralegaon Siddhi to see Hazare's social movements in action, and he also wrote about Hazare's tireless struggle to get the Right to Information Act passed in the Indian parliament.

Throughout 2011, Jeyamohan continued to write about and support Anna Hazare's anti-corruption movement and the Jan Lokpal bill. Rather than focus on the minutiae of the bill itself, Jeyamohan focused readers' attention on the ideology behind Hazare's actions – how he appealed directly to the sense of justice in the common man, his symbolism, and the Gandhian method of achieving the ultimate goal through civil non-violent mass movement without letting up any opportunity to discuss and negotiate with political opponents. Amidst widespread scepticism and slander flamed up by the national and regional media across the political spectrum, Jeyamohan remained rock solid in support of Anna Hazare's movement. By the end of the summer of 2011, Jeyamohan had written close to 60 essays on the topic, many of them in answer to readers who had written in expressing their own doubts and questions. In 2016, on the occasion of state elections in Tamil Nadu, Jeyamohan wrote a series of essays on Democracy in the newspaper Dinamalar which was published as a book.

== Controversies ==
In early 2008, Jeyamohan satirical articles on Tamil movie icons M G Ramachandran and Sivaji Ganesan were published by popular print weekly, Ananda Vikatan. The South Indian Artistes' Association passed a resolution demanding that both the publication and the writer apologize for publishing them. Ananda Vikatan tendered an apology. Fans and followers of MGR fasted in protest on March 1, 2008. The Nadigar Sangam (Association of Film Actors) published a statement saying that the author should be reprimanded.

In 2014, as part of a literary polemic, Jeyamohan said that some women poets in Tamil had been unduly celebrated. He said that they were recognized not for their poetry but for their gender identity and politics. He was criticised for his statements, with women authors and campaigners stating his views reflected his "misogynist" attitude toward women. Jeyamohan responded with his own statements clarifying his views and criticising their response.

In 2019, Jeyamohan was assaulted by a shop keeper in Kanyakumari for a dispute over spoilt idli batter. According to The Hindu, the police reported that a female store staff refused to take the batter back from Jeyamohan after he claimed it to be spoilt. Following this, Jeyamohan allegedly threw the batter packets at the shop. The escalation led the grocer, a Dravida Munnetra Kazhagam (DMK) functionary, allegedly assaulting the writer. The grocer was arrested. Jeyamohan stated that the case was delayed due to political pressure from the Bharatiya Janata Party (BJP), not the DMK, because the grocer's brother was a BJP functionary.

In 2024, Jeyamohan's blog post on the film Manjummel Boys kicked up controversy over several comments that he made on Malayalam cinema and Malayalis. The post said that the film, based on a real-life survival story involving a group of young Malayali friends visiting the Guna Caves in Kodaikanal, where one of them slips and falls into a deep hole, was "nothing but a celebration of ‘porikkis’ (loafers), justifying their drunken deeds and normalising drug abuse", like much of Malayalam cinema. He stated his concern was environmental and public-order: his blog asserts that broken glass bottles, discarded liquor bottles in sensitive forest areas are dangerous (to wild animals like elephants, forests) and such behaviour is irresponsible. This is an issue he alluded to in his celebrated novella, Elephant Doctor. His blog post also mentioned films Kili Poyi, Ozhivudivasathe Kali, Vedivazhipadu and Jallikattu, saying such films normalised addiction and prostitution, and demanded government action against such filmmakers. These remarks provoked criticism from various sections of Tamil Nadu and Kerala, saying he had slandered Malayalis.

== See also ==
- List of Sahitya Akademi Award winners for Tamil
- List of Indian writers
- List of Tamil-language writers
