= Nalloorkonam =

Village in Arumanai, Tamil Nadu, India

Nalloorkonam is a small village that belongs to Arumanai panchayat of Kanyakumari district in Tamil Nadu, India. The village has a number of rubber plantations in addition to ponds, springs and a variety of flora and fauna. Farming is the primary occupation in the village. Rainfall occurs throughout the year and ground water is abundant. The village has a temple named Ayanimoottu thamburan.

== History ==
The village's history dates back to the Medieval Ages. Around 15 years back, many burial places were unearthed in this area. (Mudhu Makkal Thazhi) This event is as yet unpublished.
