= The Tamil Literary Garden =

Canadian literary organization

- Formation: 2001
- Type: Charitable Organization
- Headquarters: Toronto, Canada
- Official language: Tamil
- President: Manuel Jesudasan
- Past President: Chelva Kanaganayakam
- Secretary: Appadurai Muttulingam
- Board Members: N.K. Mahalingam (Treasurer), Selvam Arulanandam (Director), Usha Mathivanan (Director)
- Volunteers: 22
- Website: www.tamilliterarygarden.com

The Tamil Literary Garden, is a Canadian literary organization and charity founded in 2001. The focus of this organization is on supporting translations of Tamil literature, sponsoring lecture series, commissioning publications, launching books and recognizing annually significant achievements in Tamil in a number of genres and fields.

Over a span of a few years, the activities grew to include a number of awards, such as the best work of fiction, non-fiction and poetry for the year. Translation award and Information technology in Tamil award were added on subsequently. A scholarship for a student essay submitted in English by an undergraduate or graduate student in Ontario was also introduced. In order to make the process both rigorous and transparent, a number of advisors and an international panel of judges were included.

On 3 March 2010, the Tamil Literary Garden was accepted as a charitable organization. Currently 22 volunteers take part in its activities on a regular basis assisted by the board members and none receives any financial compensations. The financial statements are being audited by a firm of Chartered Accountants.

Its founding members include Chelva Kanaganayakam, Appadurai Muttulingam, Kandiah Mahalingam, Selvam Arulanandam, and Sivakumaran Subramaniyam.

== Awards ==
=== Iyal award ===
Iyal award is a Lifetime Achievement Award, given annually to a writer, scholar, critic or editor, who, over a period of time, has made a very significant contribution to the growth or study of Tamil literature. Every year, the Tamil Literary Garden sends out a call for nominations internationally.

The nominations are reviewed by an international panel of judges who determine the winner for the year. The recipient is invited to the annual awards ceremony in Toronto where he or she is given the award that includes a cash prize of C$2,500. The Lifetime Achievement Award in Tamil is the only one of its kind anywhere in the world and is similar to other prestigious awards given in Canada, USA and U.K. It is open to all, regardless of nationality, race, ethnicity, religion, or gender.

From 2026, it has been renamed as A. Muttulingam Iyal Viruthu’ Lifetime Achievement Award

Year	Winner	Profession	Country
2001	Sundara Ramaswami	Writer	India
2002	K.Ganesh	Writer	Sri Lanka
2003	Venkat Swaminathan	Writer/ Critic	India
2004	Pathmanaba Iyer	Writer/ Publisher	U.K
2005	George L. Hart	Professor of Tamil, University of California, Berkeley	U.S.A
2006	A.C.Tarcisius	Playwright/ Director	U.K
2007	Lakshmi Holmstrom	Writer/ Translator	U.K
2008	Ambai (C.S.Lakshmi)	Writer	India
2009	Kovai Gnani	Writer	India
2009	Iravatham Mahadevan	Research Scholar	India
2010	S.Ponnuthurai	Writer	Australia
2011	S.Ramakrishnan	Writer	India
2012	Nanjil Nadan	Writer	India
2013	S.Theodore Baskaran	Writer	India
2013	Dominic Jeeva	Writer	Sri Lanka
2014	Jeyamohan	Writer	India
2015	R.Mayooranathan	Architect	Sri Lanka
2016	N.Sukumaran	Writer/Poet	India
2017	Kalyana Sundaram Sivasankaran (Vannadasan)	Writer/Poet	India
2018	V. Annamalai(Imayam)	Writer	India
2019	Su. Venkatesan	Writer	India
2021	Dr. A. R. Venkatachalapathy	Researcher and write	India
2022	Paavannan	Writer	India
2022	Letchumanan Murugapoopathy	Writer	Sri Lanka
2023	R. Balakrishnan	Writer	India
2024	Satchithananthan Sugirtharajah	Writer	England
2024	Yuvan Chandrasekar	Writer	
2025	Trotsky Marudu	Writer	India

=== Fiction Award ===
Year	Winner	Book	
2005	So. Tharman	Kookai	
2006	Joe D Cruz	Aazhi Soozh Ulagu	
2007	S.Ramakrishnan	Yamam	
2008	Thamizhavan	Vaaravil Oru Kadavul	
2009	Jeyamohan	Kotravai	
2010	P.Karunakaramoorthy	Pathungu Kuzhi	
2010	S.Venkatesan	Kaaval Kottam	
2011	Yuvan Chandrasekar	Payanak Kathai	
2012	Kanmani Gunasekaran	Anjalai	
2013	Keeranur Jakir Raja	Jinnavin Diary	
2013	Subramania Sritharan	Sritharan Kathaikal	
2014	B.Devakanthan	Kanavuchirai	
2015	Shoba Sakthi	Kandy Veeran	
2016	Sayanthan	Athirai	
2017	Tamilmagan	Vengai Nangoorathin Jeen Kurippukal	
2018	Deebachelvan	Nadukal	
2020	B.Kanmani	Idabam	
2021	P. A. Jayakaran	Collection of Short Stories. ‘P. A. Jayakaran stories	Canada
2022	Velmurugan Elango	Mannar pozhuthukaL	India
2023	A.M.Rashmy	'sattE periya kathaikalin puththakam'	Sri Lanka
2024	Ravi Arunachalam	'Bombay Cycle'	Sri Lanka
2025	Pa. Thirusenthalai	'neruppil vaLarpavai, noolvanam'	India

=== Non-Fiction Award ===
Year	Winner	Book	
2005	Crea Ramakrishnan	Tharkaalath Thamizakaraathi	
2006	A. Revathy	Unarvum Uruvamum	
2007	Nanjil Nadan	Nathiyin Pizhaiyandru Narumpunal Inmai	
2008	Dr.Murugar Gunasingam	Ilangayil Thamizhar	
2009	Dr.N.Subramanian	Eelathu Tamizh Novel Ilakkiyam	
2009	Aa.Sivasubramanian	Ash Kolaiyum Inthiya Puradchi Iyakkamum	
2010	R.S.Sugirtharajah	Panpaattu Porkanikal	
2010	S.Theodore Baskaran	Innum Pirakkaatha Thalaimuraikkaaka	
2011	Perumal Murugan	Ketta Varththai Pesuvom	
2012	Prapanchan	Thazhap Parakkum Paraththayar Kodi	
2012	Appu	Vanni Yuththam	
2013	M.Pushparajan	Nambikkaikalukku Appaal	
2014	M.Nithiyananthan	Kooliththamil	
2014	M.Jeyarani	Jathiyarravalin Kural	
2015	Ashokamitran	Kurukku Veddukal	
2016	Mysskin	Onayum Aaddukkuddiyum	
2017	Professor E.Balasundaram	Canadavil Ilangai Thamizarin Vaazvum Valamum	
2018	Umaji	Kaakkaa koththiya kaayam	
2021	K. Chandru	‘Naanum Neethipathi Aanen’	India
2022	Samraj	‘Moovanthiyil soolurum marmam’	India
2023	P.Wikneswaran	‘ninaivu nallathu’	Canada
2024	T. Pitchandi	‘enakkuL maNakkum MGR ninaivukaL’	India
2025	Thooku Selvam	‘oru thUkkuk kaithiyin vaakumUlam, kizhakku pathippakam’	India
2025	Sankara Saravanan	‘vaikaRai vAcakan pathivukaL, Vikatan Publications’	India

=== Poetry Award ===
Year	Winner	Book	
2006	Dr. U. Cheran	Meendum Kadalukku	
2007	K.Vesudean	Tholaivil	
2008	Leena Manimekalai	Ulagin Azhagiya Muthal Pen	
2009	Sukumaaran	Poomiyai Vaasikkum Sirumi	
2010	Thirumavalavan	Irul Yaazhi	
2010	Manushya Puthiran	Adheethathin Rusi	
2011	Devadhachan	Irandu Sooriyan	
2011	Anar	Enakkuk Kavithai Mukam	
2012	Theva Abira	Irul Thinra Eelam	
2012	Nillanthan	Yugapuraanam	
2013	Isai	Sivaji Ganesanin Muththangal	
2014	Kathirbharathi	Mesiyavukku Moonru Machangal	
2015	Kumaragurubaran	Marupadiyum muthalil irunthu arampikka mudiyaathu	
2016	P.Sankara Rama Subramanian	Ayiram Santhosha Ilaikal	
2017	Packiyanathan Ahilan	Ammai	
2018	Bogan Shankar	SiRiya eNkaL thoongkum aRai	
2020	S.Perundevi		
2021	Aazhiyaal	‘NedumarangkaLaai Vaazthal’	Australia
2022	Sukirtharani	‘Sukirtharani kavithaikaL’	India
2023	Ilavalai Wijayendran	‘enthak kangkaiyil inthak kaikalaik kazhuvuvathu?’	Norway
2024	Ravi Subramaniyan	‘atukitukkum thaniyan’	India
2024	Riyaza M.Zawahir	‘nilankaLin vaasam’	Sri Lanka
2025	Kaurnakaran Sivarasa	‘kANamalAkkappattOrukAka iraNdu ceyalikaL, vaiyam’	Sri Lanka

=== Translation Award ===
Year	Translator	Translation Title	Original Title	Author
2011	G.Kuppuswamy	En Peyar Sivappu	My Name is Red	Orhan Pamuk
2012	M.A.Susila	Asadan	The Idiot	Fyodor Dostoyevsky
2012	Vaidehi Herbert	'Mullaippaattu' and 'Nedunalvaadai'	'Mullaippāṭṭu' and 'Neṭunalvāṭai'	
2013	C.Mohan and Aniruddhan Vasudevan	Onaai Kulachchinnam	One Part Woman	Perumal Murugan
2014	Swarnavel Eswaran Pillai	Madras Studios – Narrative Genre and Ideology in Tamil Cinema		
2014	K.V.Shylaja	Yaarukkum Vendaatha Kan		
2015	N. Kalyan Raman (Tamil to English)	Farewell, Mahatma		
2015	Puviyarasu (English to Tamil)	Mirthathin Puththakam		
2016	Rishan Shareef (Sinhalese to Tamil)	Iruthi Maniththiyalam		
2016	Eveline Masilamani Meyer (Tamil to German)	Bananenblatter und StraBenstaub		
2017	D.I.Aravindanr (English to Tamil)	Balasaraswathi: Her Life and Art		
2018	Dr, R. Karthigesu (Tamil to English)	Kadalukku appaal	Beyond Sea	P. Singaram
2018	Era Murugan (Malayaalam to Tamil)	Peeranki PaadalkaL	Lanthan paththEriyile luththiniyakaL	N.S. Maathavan
2021	Dr. Martha Ann Selby. Professor Harvard Tamil Chair (Tamil to English)	Cat in the Agraharam and other stories	Kadavu	Dilip Kumar
2023	Jegadeesh Kumar Kesavan	A Journey Through Words	sol vazhip payanam	Bava Chelladurai
2024	Nedra Rodrigo (Tamil to English)	Prison of Dreams (5 parts)	kanavuch chiRai	Devakanthan
2025	Geetha Sukumaran (Tamil to English)	A Smile Drying On a Vine, Red River	kodiyil kidanthu ularum punnakai	pA. akilan

=== Information Technology in Tamil Award ===
Year	Winner
2006	Dr K.Srinivasan
2007	Dr.K.Kalyanasundaram
2008	Suratha Yarlvanan
2009	Tamil Linux KDE Group
2010	Muthu Nedumaaran
2011	Vasu Renganathan
2012	Mugunthraj Subramanian
2013	Mani Manivannan
2014	Muthiah Annamalai
2015	S.Raja Raman (Neechalkaran)
2016	T.Shrinivasan
2017	Sasiharan Pathmanathan
2018	Ramasamy Duraipandi

=== Foreign Language Award ===
Year	Winner	
2017	Anuk Arudpragasam	
2020	Logathasan Tharmathurai	The Sadness of Geography

=== Vision of India literature award ===
Year	Winner	
2022	Sivasankari	'Ilakkiyamulam inthiya inaippu'

=== Special Recognition Awards ===
Apart from the yearly awards, Special Recognition Awards are given on ad-hoc basis for outstanding contributions to Tamil Literature. So far three such awards were given.

Dec 2006: A.J.Canagaratne, born in Jaffna, Sri Lanka is an intellect and his most important contribution to Tamil literature is literary criticism. He gave new direction to the growth of literature in Sri Lanka and elsewhere.

July 2010: Sascha Ebeling, Asst Professor, University of Chicago, U.S.A is a researcher in Tamil language and literature of all periods, in particular 19th century culture and Tamil epigraphy. His work on 19th century Tamil literature has won two awards.

July 2013: Mr. & Mrs. Aseervatham, This award is given for the commitment to Tamil and the sponsorship of Tamil Literary Garden.

July 2015: So. Pathmanathan and Brenda Beck

July 2016: Dr. David Shulman in honour of All Teachers of the World

July 2016: Ira Ilangkumaran

June 2017: Sivakumaran Subramaniam (Chezhian)

June 2017: T. Gnanasekaran in honour of All Teachers of the World

June 2017: Dr. Nicholapillai Marier Xavier

June 2018: Navin Manogaran

June 2018: S. Thiruchelvam

2020: P.J.Dilipkumar

2020: Veerakathy Suthershan

2022: V. N. Giritharan

2023: DR. Parvathy Kanthasamy

=== Scholarship Award ===
The scholarship award was established in 2008 in order to encourage and promote Tamil Studies in the diaspora, particularly among the second generation.

Year	Winner	Essay Title
2008	Angela Britto	Naan Poitu Varan: The Importance of Tamil Studies in a Diasporic Context
2009	Kirubhalani Giruparajah	Canadian Multiculturalism - A Tamil Perspective
2010	Serothy Ramachandran	Media and Politics in Tamil Studies
2011	Ram Adrian	The Private and the Public: A Canadian Tamil Perspective
2012	Mira Ragunathan	Building Bridges: Constructing a Tamil Community in Canada
2013	Elina Toporos and Arundathy Nedra Rodrigo	New Technologies: Refashioning a Tamil Identity
2014	Vasugi Kailasam and Yugendra Ragunathan	Renegotiating New Meanings of Self in Tamil Canadian Diasporaa
2015	Renuka Murthi	Innovative Forms of Tamil Expression Today
2016	Sopika Sathiyaseelan	You Have Already Set Yourself on Fire
2017	Shangari Vijenthira	Social Media and the Making of Tamil Identities.
2018	Kalayani Rathakrishnan	What symbolizes Tamilness for me?.
2020	Sruthy Sriharan	Essay ‘ Traditions that bring my family closer together.’

=== Award Function Video Highlights ===
2012 Tamil Literary Garden Awards

2013 Tamil Literary Garden Awards

2014 Tamil Literary Garden Awards

2015 Tamil Literary Garden Awards

2016 Tamil Literary Garden Awards

2017 Tamil Literary Garden Awards

2018 Tamil Literary Garden Awards

2021 Tamil Literary Garden Awards

2022 Tamil Literary Garden Awards

2023 Tamil Literary Garden Awards

2024 Tamil Literary Garden Awards

== Nominations ==
Nomination forms are available in the website. It can be applied for self or others before 31 October of every year.

== See also ==
- Appadurai Muttulingam
- Jeyamohan
- S.Ramakrishnan
