= Kovai Gnani =

Indian Marxist thinker

- Born: K. Pazhanisamy; July 1, 1935; Somannur, Coimbatore, Madras Presidency, British India
- Died: July 22, 2020 (aged 85); Coimbatore, Tamil Nadu, India
- Occupations: writer, literary critic, Marxist thinker
- Spouse: Indrani
- Children: 2
- Parent(s): Krishnaswamy; Mariammal
- Website: http://kovaignani.org/

K. Pazhanisamy was a Tamil language writer, Marxist thinker, literary critic and scholar from Tamil Nadu, India, who wrote using the pen name Kovai Gnani. He introduced the Marxist ideology in Tamil literature, in the early 1990s, and authored 28 books on literary criticism, five collections of essays, three collections of poetry, eleven anthologies and edited many books.

He received several awards including Tamil Nadu government's best book award and Lifetime Achievement Award by The Tamil Literary Garden.

== Biography ==
Pazhanisamy was born in 1935, in Somannur in Coimbatore, of Tamil Nadu, one of the eight children of Krishnaswamy and Mariammal. He graduated in Tamil literature from Annamalai University and worked as a Tamil teacher in a school in Coimbatore for 30 years. In 1988, at the age of 55, he lost his sight due to diabetes, but that did not stop his quest for reading and writing.

As a Marxist thinker, or as a person moved towards Tamil nationalism, he did not associate with any political party or movement in India. He approached Marxism only as a philosophy. Gnani opposed classical Marxism, which approached culture only economically, and argued for the need for a Marxism suitable for India (Mannukketra Marxism) and explained it in his writings and speeches.

He was the mentor for many modern Tamil writers and poets. His contact with eminent Tamil scholars and his self-study, which continued for over 50 years, gave him an in-depth knowledge of ancient and modern Tamil literature. His involvement in Marxism and Tamil made him a critic of Tamil literature and contemporary Tamil society. He who made a significant role in founding the poetry movement Vaanampaadi, which focuses discovering new poets, with writers like Sirpi Balasubramaniam, Mehta and Bhuviyarash. As part of the Little Magazine Movement, he edited Tamil language little magazines like Puthia Thalaimurai, Vanampadihe and ran magazines like Marxia Ayvithazh, Parimanam and Nigazh. His books are being used as a subject of study in the Tamil departments of various universities in India.

=== Personal life and death ===
Gnani and his wife Indrani had two sons. He died on 20 July 2020 at Coimbatore.

== Partial bibliography ==
- Akamum pur̲amum : Tamil̲nēyam ital̲iliruntu (1 ed.). Chennai: Puthupunal. 1 January 2013. ISBN 978-81-924508-7-2. OCLC 880374970.
- Puthiya Thalamurai (Meaning: Generation)
- Marxiyam Periyariam (Meaning: Marxism and Periyarism)
- Marxiamum Tamil Ilakkiyamum (Meaning: Marxism and Tamil Literature)
- Tamilil Naveenathuvam Pinnaveenathuvam (Meaning: Modernism and Postmodernism in Tamil)
- Tamil Ilakkiyam Indrum Iniyum (Meaning:bTamil Literature: Today and Hereafter)
- Kadavul Yen Innum Saagavillai? (Meaning: Why Isn't God Dead Yet?)
- Kallum Mullum Kavithaigalum (Meaning: Stones, Thorns and Poetry)
- Marxiya Azhakiyal (Meaning: Marxist aesthetics)

== Awards and honors ==
- Tamil Nadu government's best book award 2006 (Marxiyam Periyariam)
- Pudumaipithans Vilakku Viruthu 1998
- Parithimaar Kalaignar Award for the best Tamil scholar, by the SRM University
- 'Hindu Tamil Disai' Achievement Award 2019
- Lifetime Achievement Award (Iyal award) 2009 by The Tamil Literary Garden
