= V. Krishnamurthy (veterinarian) =

Indian veterinarian and conservationist

Dr.V. Krishnamurthy
- Born: 1929
- Died: 2002
- Occupation: Veterinarian

Dr. Vaidyanathan Krishnamurthy (1929–2002) was an Indian veterinarian, conservationist and elephant expert. He has governed the Mudumalai and Theppakadu elephant camps. He is popularly referred to as Dr.K, Elephant man or Elephant Doctor (யானை டாக்டர்). He has extensively written articles on the topics of conservation and elephant physiology, and is considered to be a pioneer in the development of Elephant Rejuvenation Camps. He is a member of International Union for the Conservation of Natural Resources and Asian Elephant Specialist Group.

== Early life ==
Dr.V.Krishnamurthy was born and brought up in the erstwhile Madras Presidency. He graduated from the Madras Veterinary College and started his career as a Field Veterinary Assistant Surgeon in 1952. Upon the creation of Andhra State in 1953, Krishnamurthy was transferred to Kambam, Madurai District where he served till 1957.

== Activities ==
Krishnamurthy is known for his activities in elephant conservation and suggested darts with chemical weapons as the safest and most efficient means of capturing wild elephants. He is credited with having raised living standards of captive elephants across Tamil Nadu. From 1953 to 1956 he performed post-mortem on 18 elephants, out of which 12 had been killed by poachers. He suggested the Government of Tamil Nadu to introduce the system of Temple Elephant rejuvenation camp, where elephants domiciled in temples are sent back to the wild once a month every year, which is now followed as standard procedure. A considerable feat was the capture of the 'makhna' elephant which killed 15 people in the states of Tamil Nadu and Kerala.

== Seminars and workshops ==
Dr. V. Krishnamurthy has been on a short-time scholarship to the Smithsonian Institution, Washington, U.S. and conducted several workshops on captive elephant management. He had considerable expertise in hand rearing of orphaned elephant calves and was involved in the creation of a studbook record of captive Asian elephants. When Iain Douglas Hamilton, attended a seminar with Krishnamurthy at the Mudumalai sanctuary and found the elephants crowding around in response to his voice, he remarked, "I would love to exchange places with you.".

== Retirement ==
After his retirement, he joined the Bombay Natural History Society (BNHS) as Project Officer and actively took up assignments on Radio Collaring of Wild elephants for the study of their migration. He was also actively involved in Asian Elephant Special Group (AESG) as a Steering Committee Member. Dr. Krishnamurthy was on a long list of committees for wildlife conservation. He was Senior Technical Consultant to the Asian Elephant Research and Conservation unit of the Centre for Ecological Studies at the Indian Institute of Science, Bangalore.

== Awards ==
The Government of Tamil Nadu made Dr. Krishnamurthy an honorary warden of the Nilgiri Hills. The Government of Kerala recognised his contributions with a certificate of merit in 1989. In 2000, Krishnamurthy was awarded the Venu Menon Allies Award for Animals Welfare.

== In popular culture ==
Tamil writer Jeyamohan made Dr. Krishnamurthy one of the titular characters in his collection of short stories called "Aram" (lit. Virtue or Justice), with the story titled "Yaanai Doctor" (யானை டாக்டர்) (lit. Elephant Doctor).
