= Canadian Tamil Congress =

Canadian non-profit organization

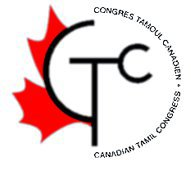
- Formation: October 2000
- Type: Non-profit organization
- Purpose: Cultural
- Headquarters: 10 Milner Business Court, Suite 513, Toronto, Ontario, M1B3C6
- Official language: English, French, Tamil
- Main organ: Board of Directors
- Website: http://www.canadiantamilcongress.ca/

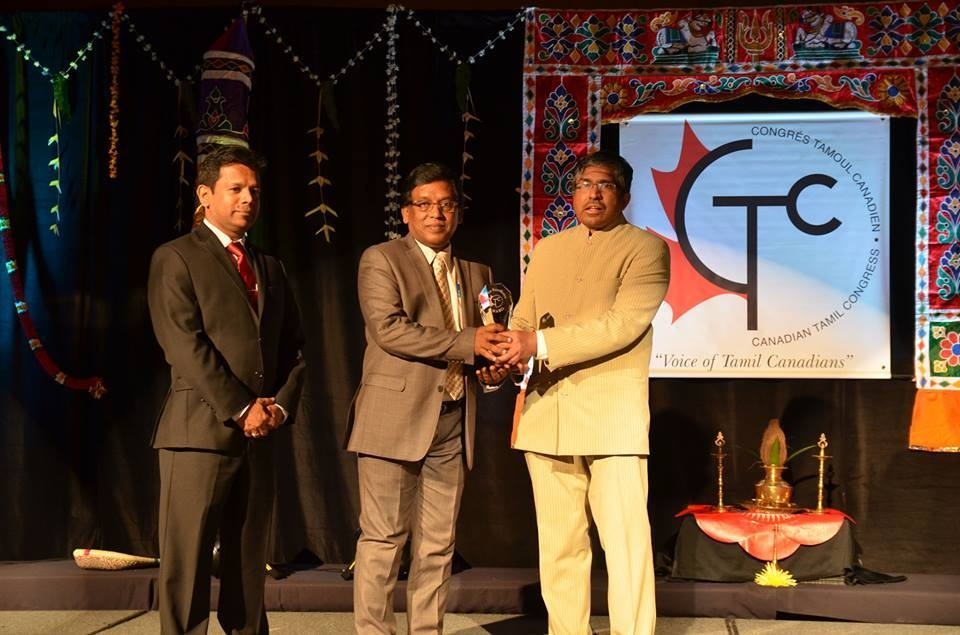
E. Saravanapavan, managing director of the Uthayan newspapers receives, the "Service Excellence Award" for journalism to "Uthayan" by the Canadian Tamil Congress. The award is bestowed annually for the achievers on various fields.

The Canadian Tamil Congress (CTC; French: Congrès Tamoul Canadien) is a Canadian non-profit organization that serves Tamil Canadians since October 2000 and has 11 chapters. The objectives of the Canadian Tamil Congress are: to promote the participation of Tamil Canadians in activities of local, regional, provincial and national importance; to uphold the Canadian values of human rights, multiculturalism, religious and cultural diversity, pluralism, and volunteerism; to champion for equal rights and in particular, gender equality; to support the cultural and political aspirations of Tamils. The organization also promotes the study and knowledge of Tamil language, culture and history within the Canadian context. The CTC also works on adjustment/settlement issues.

Canada is home to a large Tamil Canadian community. Thousands of Tamils arrived in Canada during the 1980s and 1990s, particularly as a result of Black July ethnic riots which ravaged Sri Lanka.

== Controversies ==
The Canadian Tamil Congress has been accused by the government of Sri Lanka as a front organization for the Liberation Tigers of Tamil Eelam (LTTE).

=== Ontario Superior Court of Justice's verdict against Gunaratna ===
In a February 2011 article in Lakbima News Rohan Gunaratna claimed that the Canadian Tamil Congress was a front for the Liberation Tigers of Tamil Eelam. The CTC sued Gunaratna and on 21 January 2014 the Ontario Superior Court of Justice ruled against Gunaratna, ordering him to pay the CTC damages of $37,000 and costs of $16,000. In his ruling judge Stephen E. Firestone stated that Gunaratna's claims were unequivocally and incontrovertibly "false and untrue".

=== Walk-A-Thon 2011 ===
The Sri Lankan government strongly criticised Amnesty International Canada for accepting a grant of Canadian $50,000 by CTC, which it raised at the 2011 Canadian Tamil Walk-A-Thon at Thomson Memorial Park, Scarborough. Amnesty International Canada responded that "These donations in no way impair the independence of Amnesty International – which is nonpartisan and works on human rights issues around the globe. The contributions were offered with no conditions or qualifications."

== See also ==
- Tamil diaspora
