= Venmurasu =

2006-2025 Tamil novel based on the Mahabharata

- Venmurasu, a 26-volume Tamil retelling of the Mahābhārata by Bahuleyan Jeyamohan.
- Author: Bahuleyan Jeyamohan
- Original title: Venmurasu
- Illustrator: Shanmugavel
- Language: Tamil
- Genre: Indian Magic Realism or Puranic realism
- Publisher: Natrinai Pathippagam Kizhakku Pathippagam
- Publication date: 2014
- Publication place: India
- Media type: Print (hardback & paperback)
- Pages: 22,400

Venmurasu (Tamil: வெண்முரசு, Veṇmurasu; transl. "The White Drum") is a Tamil-language novel by Bahuleyan Jeyamohan. It is a modern retelling of the Indian classic poem, The Mahābhārata.

Consisting of 26 volumes and spanning approximately 22,400 pages, Venmurasu is one of the longest novels ever published. Jayamohan began writing this novel in January 2014 and completed it in July 2020.

The novel follows a linear narrative style similar to that of the Mahābhārata. It has been published in hardcover and paperback.

== Background ==
In a 2015 Interview with CMR Tamil, author B. Jeyamohan cited the Kathakali renditions of the Mahābhārata as his main source of influence for Venmurasu. This inspiration featured the Kathakali portrayals of characters such as Duryodhana and Karna, which Jeyamohan says have taken a part in shaping his childhood. The Bhagavad Gita also influenced his worldview.

He began writing Venmurasu in January 2014 after a conversation with his daughter. He uploaded a chapter online every day throughout the writing process.

== Style ==
Jayamohan has described Venmurasu as a modern novel based on the Mahābhārata. While the epic’s framework guides the storyline, it incorporates modern literary techniques such as nested narratives, intertextuality, and fantasy elements. Jayamohan refers to this stylistic approach as Puranic Realism.

Drawings from various sources, including the Srimad Bhagavata, the Devi Bhagavata, and folk traditions, Venmurasu interweaves myths and legends from diverse Indian traditions. The novel has been compared to classical works like The Odyssey, The Iliad, and Kamba Ramayana.

Although Venmurasu roughly follows the linear structure of the Mahābhārata, its individual episodes are often non-linear. The novel frequently employs Sūtas, traditional traveling bards, to recount stories. The work is structured as a series of interconnected books, each with its own storyline, including: Mudharkanal, Mazhaippadal, Vannakkadal, Neelam, Prayagai, Venmugil Nagaram, Indraneelam, Kaandepam, Veiyon, Panniru Padaikkalam, Solvalarkaadu, Kiratham, Maalamalar, Neerkkolam, EzhuThazhal, Kuruthicharal, Imaikkanam, Senna Vengai, Thisaither Vellam, Kaarkadal, Irutkani, Theein Edai, Neerchudar, Kalittriyaanai Nirai, Kalporusirunurai, and Muthalaavin.

== Reception ==
Venmurasu has received significant responses from both readers and critics. Writers such as Indira Parthasarathy and A. Muttulingam have appreciated the novel. In 2021, an album titled A Musical Tribute to Venmurasu was released, featuring performances by Kamal Haasan and others under the direction of Mani Ratnam.

== Volumes ==
Venmurasu's volumes are listed below:

- Mudharkanal – Published online January to February 2014
- Mazhaippadal – Published online March to May 2014
- Vannkkadal – Published online June to August 2014.
- Neelam – Published online August to September 2014
- Prayagai – Published online October 2014 to January 2015
- Venmugil Nagaram – Published online February to May 2015
- Indraneelam – Published online June to August 2015
- Kaandeepam – Published online September to November 2015
- Veiyon – Published online December 2015 to early March 2016
- Panniru Padaikkalam – Published online March 2016, to June 2016
- Solvalar Kaadu – Published online July 2016 to September 2016
- Kiratham – Published online October 2016 to January 2017
- Maamalar – Published online February 2017 to May 2017
- Neerkolam – Published online May 2017 to August 2017
- Ezhuthazhal – Published online September 2017 to December 2017
- Kuruthichaaral – Published online December 2017 to March 2018
- Imaikkanam – Published online March 2018 to May 2018
- Sennaa Vaengai – Published online from June 2018 to August 2018
- Thisaither Vellam – Published online from Sept 2018 to Nov 2018
- Kaarkadal – Published online from Dec 2018 to March 2019
- Irutkani – Published online from April 2019 to June 2019
- Theein Edai – Published online from April 2019 to June 2019
- Neerchudar – Published online from July 2019 to August 2019
- kalitriyaanai Nirai – Published online from December 2019 to February 2020
- kalporu sirunurai – Published online from March 2020 to June 2020
- Muthalaavin – Published online from 20 July 2006 to 22 July 2025

== See also ==
- Kirātārjunīya
- Astra (weapon)
- Vedanta
- Mīmāṃsā
- Charvaka
- Usha Parinayam
