= Chelva Kanaganayakam =

Tamil-Canadian academic (1952–2014)

Professor Chelva Kanaganayakam FRSC
- செல்வா கனகநாயகம்
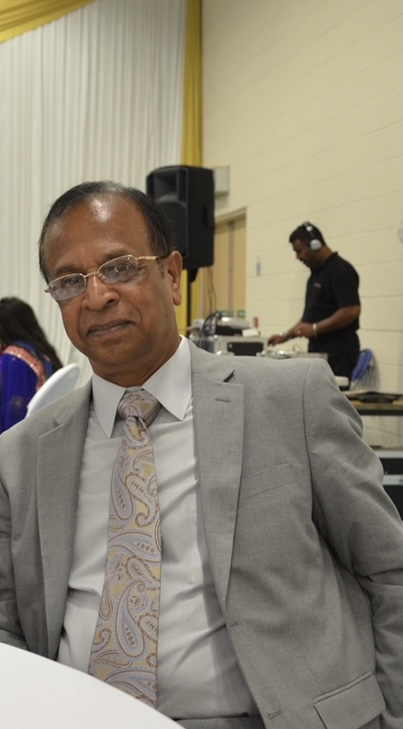
- Born: C. Kanaganayakam; May 7, 1952; Colombo, Ceylon
- Died: November 22, 2014 (aged 62); Montreal, Quebec, Canada
- Education: University of Sri Lanka; University of British Columbia
- Occupation: Academic

Professor Chelvanayakam Kanaganayakam (Tamil: செல்வநாயகம் கனகநாயகம்; May 7, 1952 – November 22, 2014) was a Tamil Canadian translator, author and academic.

== Early life and family ==
Kanaganayakam was born on May 7, 1952, in Colombo, Ceylon. He was the son of V. Chelvanayakam, head of the Department of Tamil at the University of Ceylon, Peradeniya, and Kamalambikai. He was educated at Trinity College, Kandy. After school Kanaganayakam joined the University of Sri Lanka Peradeniya campus but following Osmund Jayaratne's "re-organisation" of universities, he and other language and literature students were moved to the university's campus in Kelaniya. He graduated in 1976 with a B.A. degree in English language and literature.

Kanaganayakam was married to Thirumagal. They had a daughter (Shankary) and a son (Jegan).

== Career ==
Kanaganayakam was a lecturer in the Department of English at the University of Jaffna before joining the University of British Columbia on a Commonwealth scholarship, receiving a Ph.D. degree in 1985 after producing a thesis, supervised by W. H. New, on the writings of Zulfikar Ghose. Kanaganayakam joined the University of Toronto's Department of English in 1989 to research and teach Commonwealth literature. Appointed a professor in 2002, he went on to become director of the Centre for South Asian Studies at the Munk School of Global Affairs and co-ordinator of the independent studies program at Trinity College, Toronto.

Kanaganayakam was a founding member of the Tamil Literary Garden and the Toronto Tamil Studies Conference. On the morning of November 22, 2014, Kanaganayakam was inducted to the Royal Society of Canada as a fellow in Quebec City. That evening, as he went to a celebratory dinner in Montreal, he suffered a heart attack and died.

== Works ==
Kanaganayakam wrote, translated and edited several books:

- Structures of Negation: The Writings of Zulfikar Ghose (1993, University of Toronto Press)
- Configuartions of Exile: South Asian Writers and Their World (1995, TSAR Publications)
- Dark Antonyms and Paradise: The Poetry of Rienzi Crusz (1997, TSAR Publications)
- Lutesong and Lament: Tamil Writing from Sri Lanka (2001, TSAR Publications, editor)
- Counterrealism and Indo-Anglian Fiction (2002, Wilfrid Laurier University Press)
- Moveable Margins: The Shifting Spaces of Canadian Literature (2005, TSAR Publications, editor)
- History and Imagination: Tamil Culture in the Global Context (2007, co-editors R. Cheran & Darshan Ambalavanar)
- New Demarcations: Essays in Tamil Studies (2009, Brown Bear Press, co-editors R. Cheran & Darshan Ambalavanar)
- Wilting Laughter: Three Tamil Poets (2009, translator)
- Nedunalvaadai (2010)
- You Cannot Turn Away (2010, translator)
- Ritual (2011, translator)
- World Without Walls: Being Human, Being Tamil (2011, co-editor)
- In Our Translated World: Contemporary Global Tamil Poetry (2013, TSAR Publications, editor)
- A History of South Asian Writing in English (2014, Cambridge University Press)
- Uprooting the Pumpkin: Selections from Sri Lankan Tamil Literature, 1950-2012 (2016, Oxford University Press, editor)
