= Pani Manidhan =

1998 novel by Jeyamohan

- 2nd Ed. cover
- Author: Jeyamohan
- Original title: Pani Manidhan
- Language: Tamil
- Subject: Children's Literature, Fantasy
- Publisher: Kavitha Publications, Kizhakku, Natrinai Pathippagam
- Publication date: 1998
- Publication place: India
- Pages: 244

Pani Manidhan (1998) (Alt: Panimanidhan, Panimanithan) is a children's novel written in Tamil by Indian author Jeyamohan. It encompasses themes like adventure story, science, fantasy, mystery and values making it an important creative work in the children's literature canon in Tamil.

== Development ==
Jeyamohan had been invited by Manoj, the Editor of Tamil newspaper Dinamani's Siruvar Malar children's weekly to write a serialized novel. Jeyamohan created Pani Manidhan for the weekly in 1998 and it received considerable fan support from children as well as adults. Kavitha Publications published it as a book in 2002. Kizhakku publications and Natrinai Pathippagam brought out subsequent editions.

== Plot ==
Yeti is the legend of the Snow Man rumored to be found in the mountains of Himalayas. Many consider the legend to be somewhere between truth and lies.

An Indian military officer named Pandian is asked by his commanders to investigate certain mysterious giant footprints found in snow near a remote village. Pandian, who feels it is just the imagination of the villagers, sets out on a trip and encounters strange happenings, native legends and finally, the wondrous truths themselves.

Pandian rescues a boy named Kim from the snow. A doctor who is also out researching the Snow Man joins the group. Together they- military officer Pandian, the Buddhist mountain boy Kim and the Doctor with the Western Scientific views - begin the search for the Yeti in the mountains. The Doctor tells Pandian that the Yeti might be the proverbial missing link in the evolutionary chain to Humans. But Kim, who says he has seen the Snow Man, says the Yeti looks nothing like the monkeys in the pictures shown by the Doctor and he looks more like Homo erectus.

Along the way, Pandian is surprised to see Kim performing sophisticated breathing and meditation Yoga exercises. Through various adventures, Kim explains his native cultural beliefs and practices that correspond to Pandian's and the Doctor's statements on nature, humanity, soul, evolution and natural effects.

The group encounters Bhikshus searching for their Lama. They are led to a fantasy land where it is revealed that there exists a society of Yetis and other creatures. Their world is one of biblical harmony and coexistence of all creatures. In fact, the Yetis have planned and engineered the whole adventure for the group. Kim is the only human who has throughout remained conscious of the actions of the soul. The group leave the land with far greater understanding of nature and the universe.

On their way back, the group again meets the Bhikshus who choose Kim as their head Lama. The Doctor and Pandian pay their respects to Kim. The truth about the legend of the Yeti the Snow Man is preserved as a secret.

== Themes ==
Pani Manidhan has themes of adventure mixed with spiritual pilgrimage. Jeyamohan has said that "..as the children grow up, the story grows with them". It has a fantasy story that is supported by deep discussions on science and philosophy.

The story begins with the scientific analysis by Pandian and ends with the revelation that the Snow Man is the incarnation of Maitreya Buddha. It explains that Science is not the only way to understand Nature, but without discrediting Science. Pani Manidhan is an effort to simultaneously describe the beauty of both Science and Mythology to young readers, and the ways they work.

== Style ==
Pani Manidhan was written in a style accessible to readers of eight and above. Most of the sentences are only six words in length.
