= In Our Translated World =

In Our Translated World: Contemporary Global Tamil Poetry
- Editor: Chelva Kanaganayakam
- Authors: 78 Poets
- Translator: Anushiya Ramaswamy, Maithili Thayanithy and M. L. Thangappa.
- Language: English, Tamil
- Genre: Poetry
- Publisher: Tamil Literary Garden jointly with TSAR Publications
- Publication date: 2013
- Publication place: Canada
- Media type: Book
- Pages: 269
- ISBN: 1927494362

In Our Translated World: Contemporary Global Tamil Poetry is a bilingual (Tamil and English) anthology of Tamil poetry, published in 2013. This collection contains poems by 78 Tamils, of whom 21 are women. The authors are from many countries, including India, Sri Lanka, Malaysia, Singapore, Canada, Australia and Europe. Similarly, their backgrounds and experiences are diverse, described as being "women and men, young and old, Hindu, Muslim and Christian".

In a note about the importance of this work, Professor Sascha Ebeling of the Department of South Indian Studies, University of Chicago stated the following: "Never before has an anthology of Tamil poetry in translation offered such a broad perspective, and no other book to date demonstrates so well the fact that over the past two decades Tamil literature has become a truly global affair.".

In Our Translated World is the result of a project undertaken by Tamil Literary Garden with funding from Ontario government's Trillium Foundation and others. It was edited by Chelva Kanaganayakam, professor in the Department of English and the Director for the Centre for South Asian Studies at the University of Toronto. This book was released on 9 March 2014 at the Scarborough Convention Centre.

== Selection and translation ==
The selection committee consisted of poets, writers and academics. This included Mohanarangan, Sukumaran, A. Yesurasa, Selvam Arulanantham, Usha Mathivanan, Thirumavalan, S. Yuvarajan, Latha and Annar.

The works were translated by Anushiya Ramaswamy, Maithili Thayanithy and M. L. Thangappa.

== Themes ==
The poems in this anthology cover a range of themes. The "struggle between modernity and tradition", "transition from an oppressive plantation culture to urban spaces", urbanization, "Sri Lankan Tamils political upheaval and its consequent social and cultural disintegration", sexual assault, violence, poverty, women issues, emigrant/immigrant experiences and existentialism are major themes covered in this collection.

== See also ==
- Tamil literature
