= Rubber (novel) =

1990 novel by Jeyamohan

- First edition cover
- Author: Jeyamohan
- Original title: Rubber
- Language: Tamil
- Subject: Ecology & Sociology
- Publisher: Thamizh Puthagalayam
- Publication date: 1990
- Publication place: India
- Pages: 200
- Followed by: Novel

Rubber (1990) was the first published novel of Indian author Jeyamohan. It was the first major work in Tamil that explored ecological and environmental theme as a context for ethical degradation in Tamil fiction. Set as a multi-generational family drama taking place against the backdrop of rubber plantations, the novel describes the hunger for social and commercial growth that inevitably exploits the environment. Rubber, introduced into India as a cash crop, is the alien species that chokes the land and destroys the values symbolized by the traditional Banana tree. The novel was widely acclaimed and won the Akhilan Memorial prize in 1990 heralding the arrival of Jeyamohan in the Indian literary scene.

== Development ==
Jeyamohan had first written the novel in 1986 and had revised it through 1988. He further edited it down for length and submitted to the Akhilan Memorial prize in 1990. As it won the prize and gained fame, Akhilan Kannan's Thamizh Puthagalayam published the novel under its Dhaagam imprint.

== Plot ==
The story traces the rise and fall of the Peruvattar family, rubber plantation owners based in the Kanyakumari Nanjil district in Tamil Nadu. The story begins in the present and moves back briefly to trace the early life of the family patriarch Ponnu Peruvattar. Ponnu begins life as a forest laborer and slowly grows to acquire the entire forest and converts it into a rubber plantation through hard work and ruthless means. Rubber, which is alien to the Nanjil land, provides wealth, power and social position to the Peruvattar dynasty, but also corrupts it from within. Ponnu's equally ruthless son Chelliah tries to expand the empire; Chelliah's wife Therese exhibits all the trappings of the wealthy - Chelliah worships her despite her infidelity. The last two of Chelliah and Therese's five children still reside with the family - Francis, the grandfather's favourite, is a wastrel; Livy goes to college but lacks morals and compassion. Thangam, one of the family's servant maids is of the Arakkal family, the fallen landlords and former employers of Ponnu in his early days. Ponnu has always taken secret pleasure in pointing her lowly status to his visitors. Thangam who has put up with Livy's sexual abuse gets pregnant and commits suicide.

The ailing patriarch Ponnu spends his last days contemplating whether his life was worth anything at all. Chelliah faces financial ruin as he dabbles in exports, and he desperately wants his father to die soon so that he could sell the family home and assets. Francis hates his mother Therese and Livy for their diabolical plans to sell of the family home. Dependent on the spiteful family for even minor needs and consumed by guilt and self-pity, Ponnu Peruvattar begs his assistant Kunhi for poison. He is visited by his old friend, the simple and noble Kangaani, a tribal who had roamed the forest land with him in his youth. Kangaani's grandson Lawrence is a doctor and social worker. The novel ends with the death of the patriarch and the salvation of family scion Francis who joins Lawrence.

== Themes ==
Rubber, the new species that sucks up all the nutrients from the land is contrasted with the Banana that has a more symbiotic relationship with the environment. This is a constant metaphor in the novel for how commercialization destroys the basic idealism and values in human life.

In its pages, Rubber weaves a textured portrayal of the cultural and social history of a changing land and the values it represents.

== Reception and awards ==
Rubber was awarded the Akhilan Memorial Prize 1990 for Best Literary work. Well-known critics and authors like Indira Parthasarathy and Ki Rajanarayanan were part of the prize committee and they commended the work for its theme and depth.

A week after the prize was announced, Vijaya Publications' Velayudham hosted a felicitation event for the debut novelist in Coimbatore, which was attended by many luminaries of the Tamil literary world including Sa Kandasamy and Gnanakoothan. In the event, Jeyamohan made a speech about the Novel form and its state in Tamil. The award and the speech created lot of attention for Rubber and Jeyamohan in Tamil. Jeyamohan further refined the developed the theme of his speech into his critical work Novel.

Noted writer Jayakanthan has praised Rubber as his most favorite of Jeyamohan's works.
