= P. Singaram =

Pa.Singaram
- Born: 12 August 1920; Singampunari, Madras Presidency, British India (now in Tamil Nadu, India)
- Died: 30 December 1997 (aged 77); Madurai, Tamil Nadu, India
- Occupations: Novelist, Editor, Garment businessman
- Writing career
- Language: Tamil, Malay, Bahasa
- Period: 1920–1997
- Genre: Fiction
- Subjects: Travel, War
- Notable works: Puyalile Oru Thone; Kadalukku Appal

Pazhanivel Singaram (12 August 1920 - 30 December 1997) was an Indian writer who wrote in Tamil. Despite having authored only two novels, he is considered to be one of the greatest Tamil novelist of the modern era. His Puyalile Oru Thoni is considered to be one of the very important Tamil fiction of all time.

== Early life and education ==
Singaram was born on 12 August 1920 as the third son of Ku.Pazhanivel Nadar and Unnamalai Ammal in a town called Singampunari in present-day Sivaganga district, Tamil Nadu. His elder brothers were named Subramanian and Bhaskaran. The family was involved in clothes business along with Singaram's grandfather Kumarasamy Nadar.

Singaram had his primary education at Singampunari Public school and further education at St.Mary's higher secondary school Madurai.

== Years abroad (1938-46) ==
When he was 18 years old, Singaram went to Medan, Indonesia to work as an assistant for a pawnbroker named S K Sinnamuthu Pillai. He married a woman there (possibly of British Malaya). When he was 25 years old, his wife died in her pregnancy.

After a brief return to India in 1940, Singaram once again went to Indonesia and worked in the Public Works Department, around the time of the South-East Asian theatre of World War II. After the end of World War II, he and some other Tamils obtained the approval of the Indonesian government to load cargo in ships bound for Penang, Malaysia.

He came back to India in September 1946 and lived in Madurai, working at the local Dina Thanthi newspaper office till he took voluntary retirement in 1987. He did not maintain close relationships with anybody and lived alone for 50 years in an YMCA hostel in Madurai.

== Literary career ==
During his second stay in Medan, Singaram didn't get his share of Tamil magazines, as ship transport between India and Indonesia was stopped. However, the Public Library in Penang, Malaysia evoked his interest in Hemingway, Tolstoy, Faulkner, Chekhov and Dostoyevsky.

He has more than once spoke of Ernest Hemingway's influence in his works and listed him as his favorite writer. His influence of Hemingway was very evident in both his works and he considered A Farewell to Arms his favorite and masterpiece of Hemingway. He believed A Farewell to Arms an important milestone in American literature and rated Anna Karenina more than War and Peace.

His knowledge on Tamil literature was limited to short stories of Pudhumaipithan and Mouni he read before travelling to Indonesia. In his later years when asked whether he is aware of the present Tamil writers and their works he commented it lacked depth and he couldn't read past two pages of Sujatha and Sivasankari

=== Kadalukku Appal ===
P Singaram wrote this novel in 1950 immediately after he returned to India. Though he sent the novel to many publishers the novel kept returning without getting published. A friend sent this novel to Kalaimagal publications for a novel contest. The novel won first prize in that novel contest. Finally, he was able to publish Kadalukku Appal in 1959 through Kalaimagal publications.

=== Puyalile Oru Thoni ===
This novel was written in 1962 and it didn't find any publishers -after continuous efforts by a friend, Puyalile Oru Thoni was published in 1972 by Kalaignan Publications. Many modern Tamil writers consider this as an important literary work published in Tamil in the 20th century. The story happens in Sumatra in the background of World War II.

As he was so frustrated by the difficulties he faced in publishing these two novels, Singaram never wrote anything after that.

Several notable film-makers have expressed their desire to make this epic novel into a movie but conceding it's an impossible task to do justice to this book.

== Later years and death ==
Writers Konangi, N. Murugesa Pandian, S. Ramakrishnan and many others met Singaram in his last years of life and told him in person how much they were moved by his works. They repeatedly told Singaram's his stronghold in Tamil literature but Singaram was stoic as ever. He refused to accept his place and no more wrote.

Around September 1997, following his eviction from the YMCA hostel, Singaram took up residence in Nadar Mahajana Sangam (near Vilakkuthoon in Madurai). He gave away his entire saving of ₹. 7,00,000 to social welfare trusts. Soon, his health condition deteriorated and on 30 December 1997, he died in ambulance while being taken to hospital. He had told not to inform about his death to anyone.
