= Mullaippāṭṭu =

Ancient Tamil poem in Sangam literature

Mullaippāṭṭu முல்லைப்பாட்டு
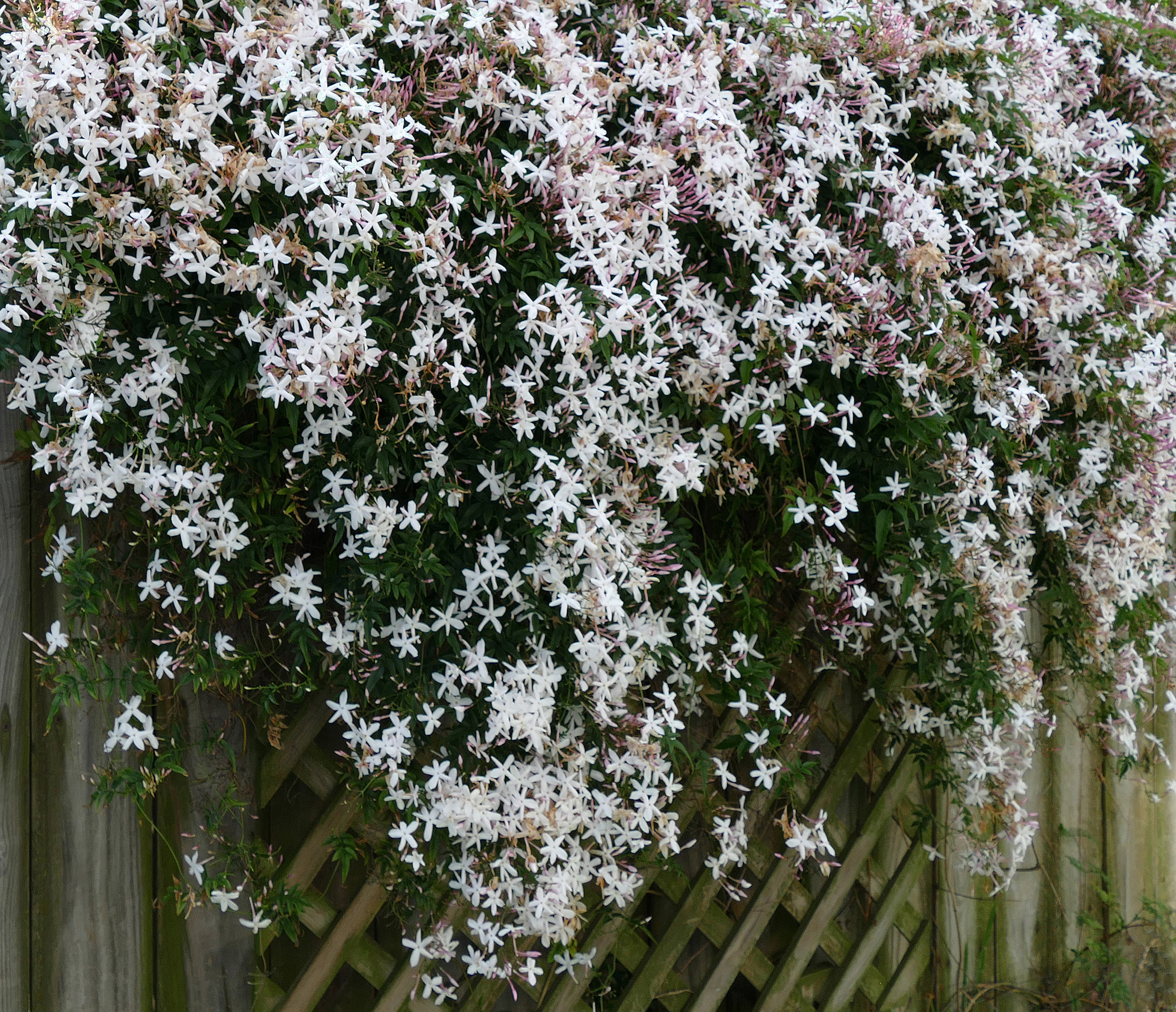
- The Mullaippattu poem is named after the 'mullai' creeper (above) found in jungles.
- Author: Napputanar
- Working title: Mullaippaattu
- Language: Old Tamil
- Series: Ten Idylls anthology of the Eighteen Greater Texts series
- Subject: Akam (love)-genre
- Genre: Poetry
- Set in: Post-Sangam era (c. 230 CE or slightly later)
- Publication place: India

Mullaippāṭṭu (Tamil: முல்லைப்பாட்டு, lit. 'the forest or jungle song') is an ancient Tamil poem in the Sangam literature. Authored by Napputanar, it is the shortest poem in the Ten Idylls (Pattuppāṭṭu) anthology, consisting of 103 lines in akaval meter. It is largely an akam-genre (love) poem about a wife in grief when her husband does not return from the war front, when he promised he will. The Mullaippattu weaves her sorrow with her attempts at patience and self-control. The poem was likely composed about 230 CE or slightly later, according to Kamil Zvelebil – a Tamil literature scholar.

The title of the poem Mullaippattu refers to the creeper mullai (jasmine) that carries sweet-smelling flowers in the jungles of South India, states Chelliah. It metonymically connotes the jungle home and sweet wife a warrior chieftain left when he went on his military campaign. He promised to return before the rains. The rains have come, are falling abundantly, but neither has her husband returned nor a word about him has come. She is worried and in grief. She and her maids proceed to a Vaishnavite temple (A Temple with Lakshmi and Vishnu) and Pray for his return and make offerings. They seek omens and words of guess. She tries to be patient but can hide her sorrow. The poem alternates lines painting her in her cycles of emotions. Then, she hears the trumpeting approach of victorious troupes, signaling the return of her husband. She is filled with joy.

The poem is "one of the most beautiful of the Pattuppattu songs, states Zvelebil. The akam portions of the poem paint the lover's anguish, while the puram portions describe the temporary military camp of the chieftain in the jungle. The chieftain is reflecting on the loss of life, the injured soldiers and the crippled elephants in previous military campaigns. His wife is worried about him. The two portions – akam and puram – are woven together in the form of a mattu (linking) for a contrasting impact. The 14th-century scholar Naccinarkkiniyar wrote a commentary on this poem.

== Practice of Sri Vaishnavism ==
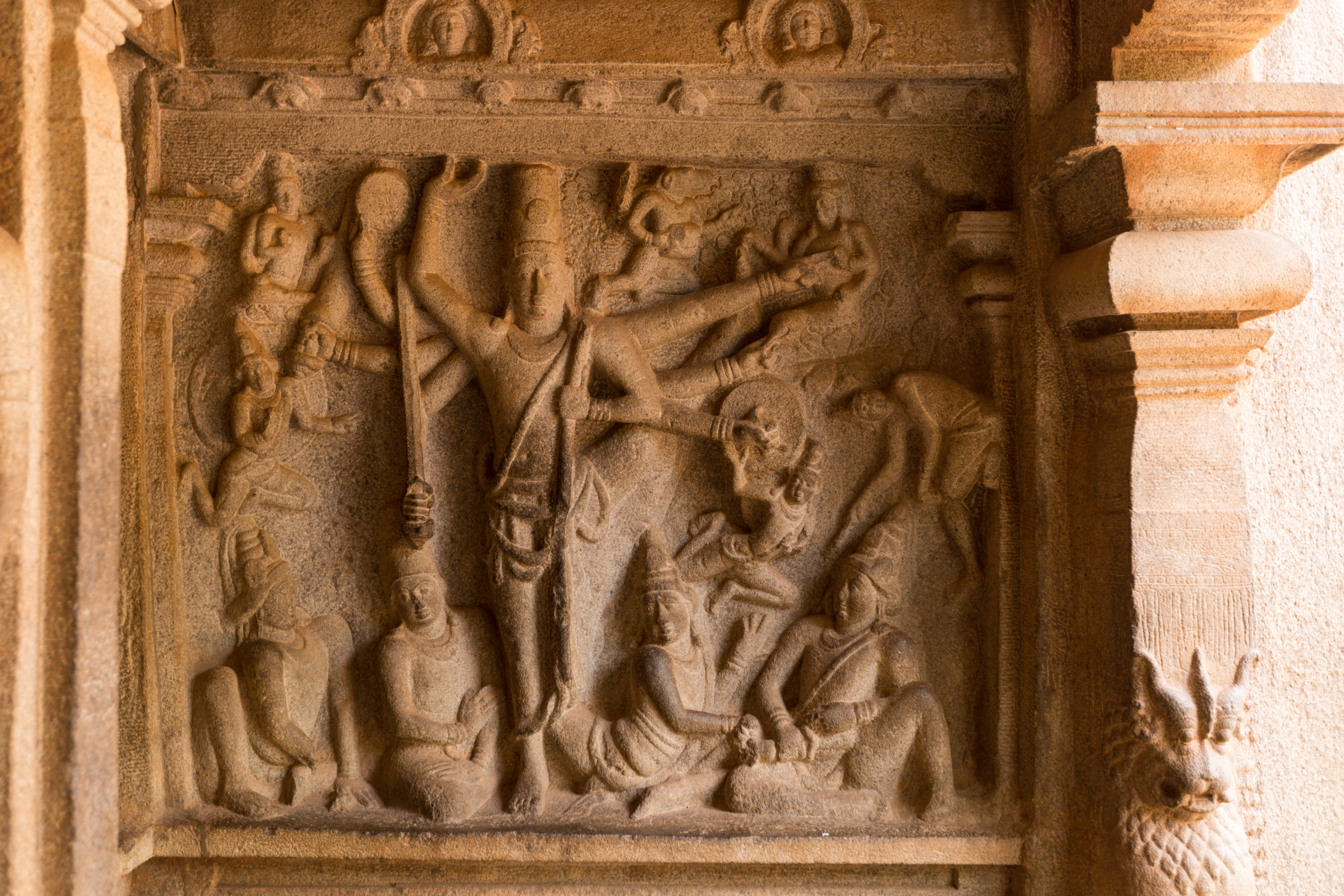
Sculpture of Vishnu Measuring the Earth in Mahabalipuram Dating 7th Century CE

The short poem mentions the Hindu god Vishnu through an elaborate simile. The text mentions that The clouds resemble Vishnu in three points: (1) the clouds are black like the dark god, (2) they encompass the hills even as Vishnu encompasses the earth; (3) they pour rain as the water dripped from the hands of Vishnu as he rose expanding himself. The allusion is to the story that Vishnu who came down to the Earth as a dwarf to crush the tyrant Mahabali, and begged of him three square feet of earth. When that was granted, and the king poured water as a token of his gift, the god expanded himself with the water dripping from his hands, and crushed the king with his enormous feet. It also mentions the goddess of wealth, Lakshmi in lines 6–7, to whom the women pray for the return of the warriors. Lines 46–47 of Mullaippattu mentions Brahmin yogis in saffron-colored clothes carrying three staves (Thridhandam).

== Historical Information ==
The Mullaippattu is a source of historical and social information. It is notable for its mention of yavanas (Greek-Romans, lines 61, 73–83) as part of the troupes in the Tamil kingdom's army. It describes their dress, uses the word mileccar for them, and calls them the bodyguard of the king. The yavanas can't speak the local language and communicate using gestures, states Mullaippattu. The mahouts (riders) of the elephants are described as "speaking the northern language". The military camp is described as camouflaged, tents covered with leaves, and the entire camp surrounded by thorny cover. The poem mentions water clock, different variety of flowers in the jungle, and warriors going into battle wearing a garland of flowers. The poem has about 500 words, predominantly Tamil. It has 13 Sanskrit loan words and 2 non-Tamil provincial words.

== See also ==
- Pattuppāṭṭu
- Sangam literature
