= Mudharkanal =

- Directed by: R. Venkataramanan
- Written by: R. Venkataramanan
- Produced by: R. Pothiraj
- Starring: Ashwin Viswanathan; Rajesh; Yogesh; Baby Tharika
- Production company: Sri Genga Productions
- Release date: July 10, 2026 (India)
- Running time: 119 minutes
- Country: India
- Language: Tamil

Mudharkanal is a 2026 Indian Tamil-language drama film written and directed by R. Venkataramanan and produced by R. Pothiraj under Sri Genga Productions. The film stars Ashwin Viswanathan, Rajesh, Yogesh and Baby Tharika.

The film focuses on the impact of substance abuse and its consequences on individuals and families.

== Plot ==
A talented teenager with a promising future experiences a downfall after being influenced by a harmful friendship that leads him into drug addiction. After losing important aspects of his life, he receives an opportunity to recover and rebuild himself. The story follows his struggle to face the consequences of his past actions and change the direction of his life.

== Cast ==
- Ashwin Viswanathan
- Rajesh
- Yogesh
- Baby Tharika

== Production ==
=== Development ===
The film was written and directed by R. Venkataramanan. It was produced by R. Pothiraj through Sri Genga Productions.

== Themes ==
The film is based on issues surrounding drug addiction and its effects.

== Release ==
Mudharkanal was scheduled for a theatrical release on 10 July 2026.
