= Tamil Canadians =

Ethnic group in Canada

கனேடிய தமிழர்
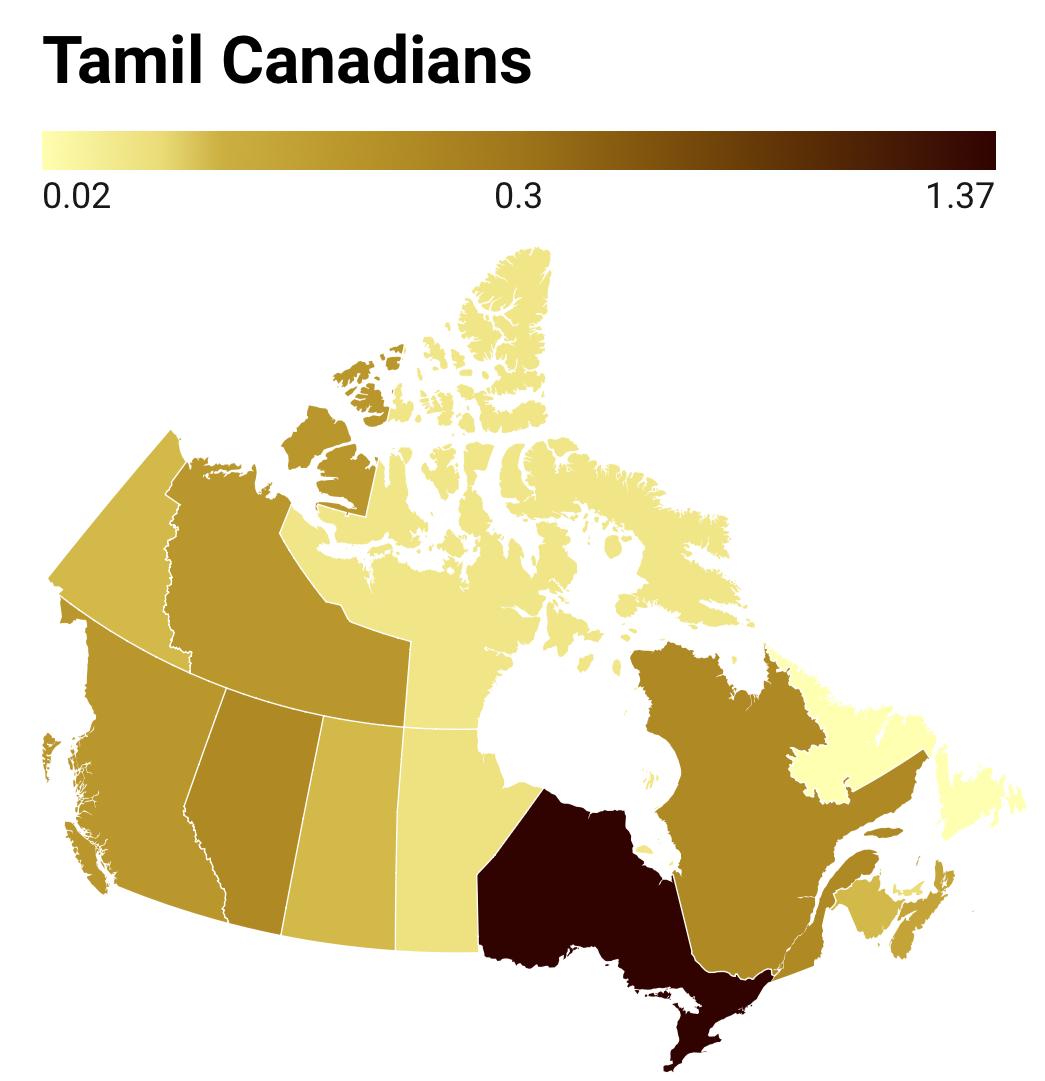
- Population distribution of Tamil Canadians by province/territory, 2021 census

Total population
- 237,890 (Note: Statistic includes all speakers of the Tamil language, as many multi-generation individuals do not speak the language as a mother tongue, but instead as a second or third language.); 0.7% of the total Canadian population (2021)

Regions with significant populations
- Greater Toronto, Greater Montreal, Greater Vancouver, Calgary Region, Edmonton Region, National Capital Region

Languages
- Tamil, Canadian English, Canadian French

Religion
- Predominantly: Hinduism (75.8%); Minorities: Christianity (17.4%); Irreligion (5.5%); Islam (1.0%); Buddhism (0.13%); Sikhism (0.04%); Judaism (0.02%); Indigenous (0.01%); Others (0.1%) (Note: Religious breakdown proportions based on "Tamil" ethnic or cultural origin response on the 2021 census.)

Related ethnic groups
- Indian Tamils, Sri Lankan Tamils

Tamil Canadians, or Canadian Tamils, are Canadians of Tamil ethnic origin. Much of Canada's Tamil diaspora consists of Sri Lankan Tamil refugees who arrived during the Sri Lankan Civil War between the 1970s and 2000s, while Tamil expatriates also originate from Sri Lanka, India, Singapore and other parts of South Asia.

Canada's Tamil population is among the largest in the Western world, with Toronto being home to one of the largest Tamil-speaking populations outside of Asia.

From a population of fewer than 150 in 1983, Tamils have become one of the largest ethnic groups within the Greater Toronto Area, and form an increasing share of the overall Canadian population. As per the 2021 Canadian census, Tamil Canadians number approximately 240,000 and account for roughly 0.7% of Canada's population.

== History ==
With the outbreak of riots and eventual civil war in Sri Lanka in 1983, Tamil migration to Canada increased significantly. In 2000, Sri Lanka was the sixth largest source country of immigrants to Canada, sending 5,841 people or 2.57% of Canada's immigrant total. Between 1991 and 2001, Sri Lanka was the fifth largest source country of immigrants to Canada, after China, India, the Philippines, and Hong Kong.

Between 2001 and 2010 Sri Lanka's rank dropped to 17 in the list of immigrant source countries to Canada. Well behind the major source countries China (327,317), India (277,819) and Philippines (191,121). In 2010 immigrants from Sri Lanka consisted of only 1.4% of Canada's immigrant total of 280,681.

Most permanent residents from Sri Lanka came as either independent immigrants, refugees, or family class sponsored immigrants.

Refugee claimants are an independent category of Tamils from Sri Lanka who arrived in Canada and are claiming protection under the Immigration and Refugee Protection Act. After 2001 there have been no Government of Canada or private sponsored Tamil refugees to Canada. There are 141,074 UNHCR recognized Tamil refugees in non-signatory countries. There are a total of 589,639 refugees from Sri Lanka in 2011 who have registered with the UNHCR in non-signatory countries.

| Year | Permanent residents | Refugee claimants | Government/private sponsored refugees |
|---|---|---|---|
| 1999 | 4,728 | 2,802 | 3 |
| 2000 | 5,849 | 2,898 | 7 |
| 2001 | 5,520 | 2,824 | 0 |
| 2002 | 4,968 | 1,589 | 0 |
| 2003 | 4,448 | 1,239 | 0 |
| 2004 | 4,135 | 1,134 | 0 |
| 2005 | 4,690 | 854 | 0 |
| 2006 | 4,490 | 862 | 0 |
| 2007 | 3,934 | 779 | 0 |
| 2008 | 4,509 | 1,013 | 0 |
| 2009 | 4,269 | 2,758 | 0 |
| 2010 | 4,181 | 2,778 | 0 |

== Demography ==
=== Population ===
Tamil−Canadian Population History
| Year | Pop. | ±% |
|---|---|---|
| 1991 | 37,330 | — |
| 1996 | 80,635 | +116.0% |
| 2001 | 111,580 | +38.4% |
| 2006 | 138,675 | +24.3% |
| 2011 | 179,465 | +29.4% |
| 2016 | 189,860 | +5.8% |
| 2021 | 237,890 | +25.3% |
Source: Statistics Canada

=== Religion ===
Religious breakdown of Tamil Canadians (2021)
1. Hinduism (75.8%)
2. Christianity (17.4%)
3. Irreligion (5.50%)
4. Islam (1.00%)
5. Buddhism (0.10%)
6. Others (0.20%)

Tamil Canadian demography by religion
| Religious group | 2021 | |
| Religious group | Pop. | % |
|---|---|---|
| Hinduism | 77,440 | 75.79% |
| Christianity | 17,775 | 17.4% |
| Irreligion | 5,610 | 5.49% |
| Islam | 1,050 | 1.03% |
| Buddhism | 135 | 0.13% |
| Sikhism | 40 | 0.04% |
| Judaism | 20 | 0.02% |
| Indigenous spirituality | 10 | 0.01% |
| Other | 100 | 0.1% |
| Total Tamil Canadian responses | 102,175 | 42.95% |
| Total Tamil Canadian population | 237,890 | 100% |

== Geographic distribution ==
=== Provinces & territories ===
Tamil Canadians by province and territory (1991−2021)
| Province/ territory | 2021 | | 2016 | | 2011 | | 2006 | | 2001 | | 1996 | | 1991 | |
| Province/ territory | Pop. | % | Pop. | % | Pop. | % | Pop. | % | Pop. | % | Pop. | % | Pop. | % |
|---|---|---|---|---|---|---|---|---|---|---|---|---|---|---|
| Ontario | 192,890 | 1.37% | 157,700 | 1.19% | 149,030 | 1.17% | 117,390 | 0.98% | 92,465 | 0.82% | 67,085 | 0.63% | 29,270 | 0.29% |
| Quebec | 20,050 | 0.24% | 17,245 | 0.22% | 19,460 | 0.25% | 13,965 | 0.19% | 13,180 | 0.18% | 9,440 | 0.13% | 5,315 | 0.08% |
| Alberta | 10,105 | 0.24% | 7,195 | 0.18% | 3,995 | 0.11% | 1,940 | 0.06% | 1,630 | 0.06% | 1,255 | 0.05% | 940 | 0.04% |
| British; Columbia | 9,740 | 0.2% | 5,445 | 0.12% | 5,345 | 0.12% | 4,230 | 0.1% | 3,270 | 0.08% | 1,710 | 0.05% | 865 | 0.03% |
| Nova; Scotia | 1,570 | 0.16% | 450 | 0.05% | 350 | 0.04% | 155 | 0.02% | 210 | 0.02% | 165 | 0.02% | 130 | 0.01% |
| Saskatchewan | 1,120 | 0.1% | 635 | 0.06% | 335 | 0.03% | 390 | 0.04% | 230 | 0.02% | 300 | 0.03% | 180 | 0.02% |
| Manitoba | 1,100 | 0.08% | 655 | 0.05% | 330 | 0.03% | 360 | 0.03% | 360 | 0.03% | 475 | 0.04% | 455 | 0.04% |
| New; Brunswick | 725 | 0.1% | 190 | 0.03% | 125 | 0.02% | 45 | 0.01% | 75 | 0.01% | 60 | 0.01% | 45 | 0.01% |
| Prince Edward; Island | 140 | 0.09% | 40 | 0.03% | 50 | 0.04% | 0 | 0% | 10 | 0.01% | 0 | 0% | 0 | 0% |
| Newfoundland and Labrador | 80 | 0.02% | 245 | 0.05% | 150 | 0.03% | 175 | 0.03% | 130 | 0.03% | 135 | 0.02% | 105 | 0.02% |
| Northwest; Territories | 80 | 0.2% | 20 | 0.05% | 25 | 0.06% | 10 | 0.02% | 15 | 0.04% | 20 | 0.03% | 15 | 0.03% |
| Yukon | 40 | 0.1% | 45 | 0.13% | 20 | 0.06% | 15 | 0.05% | 10 | 0.04% | 0 | 0% | 0 | 0% |
| Nunavut | 25 | 0.07% | 20 | 0.06% | 10 | 0.03% | 0 | 0% | 0 | 0% | N/A | N/A | N/A | N/A |
| Canada | 237,890 | 0.65% | 189,860 | 0.55% | 179,465 | 0.54% | 138,675 | 0.44% | 111,580 | 0.38% | 80,635 | 0.28% | 37,330 | 0.14% |

=== Federal electoral districts ===
Based on Census 2016

1. Scarborough—Rouge Park, ON - 13.94% (14,255)
2. Scarborough North, ON - 12.23% (12,080)
3. Markham—Thornhill, ON - 10.61% (10,515)
4. Scarborough-Guildwood, ON - 9.45% (9,680)
5. Scarborough Centre, ON - 9.40% (10,590)
6. Markham—Stouffville, ON - 6.71% (8,460)
7. Scarborough—Agincourt, ON - 5.18% (5,465)
8. Ajax, ON - 5.12% (6,125)
9. Brampton East, ON - 5.08% (6,195)
10. Mississauga—Malton, ON - 3.95% (4,675)
11. Scarborough Southwest, ON - 3.65% (4,025)
12. Brampton West, ON - 3.35% (4,360)
13. Mississauga East—Cooksville, ON - 2.41% (2,895)
14. Humber River—Black Creek, ON - 2.36% (2,555)
15. Mississauga Centre, ON - 2.34% (2,925)
16. Etobicoke North, ON - 2.31% (2,730)
17. Brampton North, ON - 2.22% (2,620)
18. Toronto Centre, ON - 2.21% (2,295)
19. Brampton South, ON - 2.18% (2,645)
20. Markham—Unionville, ON - 2.14% (2,645)
21. Pierrefonds—Dollard, QC - 2.08% (2,255)
22. Saint-Laurent, QC - 2.03% (2,010)

== Media ==
Much of the Tamil language media in Canada is based in Toronto, while some centres operate in Montreal. A community magazine, Thamizhar Mathiyil (Amidst Tamils), has been published since 1990 and has grown to several hundred pages in length. Ten alternative weekly Tamil language newspapers are distributed primarily in Toronto and Montreal. The Monsoon Journal and the Tamil Mirror are English language newspapers created and targeted at Tamils. Four Tamil language radio stations broadcast out of Toronto and Montreal as well. Three Tamil language online News (The Tamil Journal தமிழ் இதழ்), television stations (Tamil Vision International, Tamil One, and Tamil Entertainment Television) are based in Toronto.

== Social and political activity ==
Various political, social and religious organizations exists among the Tamil Canadian community. One such organization is Canadian Tamil Congress, which works as a community and lobby group to communicate on behalf of some Tamil Canadians at the municipal, provincial, federal, and international levels. The Canadian Tamil Congress is the largest of these organizations with 11 chapters in the country. The smaller organizations are geared towards organizing kin and village groups from Sri Lanka, as well as supporting various political parties such as the Liberal Party of Canada, New Democratic Party and Conservative Party of Canada. Tamil candidates have participated in the political process representing various parties at municipal, provincial and federal level. In 2011, Rathika Sitsabaiesan was elected as the first Tamil-Canadian Member of Parliament, as a New Democrat in Scarborough-Rouge River. In 2018, Vijay Thanigasalam was elected to the Legislative Assembly of Ontario and currently represents Scarborough-Rouge River as a member of the Progressive Conservative Party of Ontario. During his time as a member, he has taken upon numerous initiatives in the Tamil Community and the Scarborough-Rouge River Riding as a whole. Some of his achievements include introducing Bill 104, An Act to proclaim Tamil Genocide Education Week in Ontario. Previously, Logan Kanapathi was the first Tamil Canadian candidate to win election to large municipal government. He currently serves his second term as Ward 7 councilor in the town of Markham. Many Hindu Temples have been built by the community to cater to its religious needs. Hindu Youth Network, an organization founded by Sri Lankan Tamils, is currently the largest Hindu youth movement in Canada with thousands of Hindu Tamil students and over 80% of the Hindu student groups in the country under its umbrella. There are also Christian churches that cater particularly to the Tamil community in Canada.

Tamil Canadians have run multiple campaigns encouraging the donation of blood to the Canadian Blood Services organized by various Canadian Tamil organizations. The community also undertook a recent campaign to help SickKids Hospital, which treats 100,000 children every year. These campaigns were organized by the Canadian Tamil Congress, with the support of many social and community organizations.

== Tamil Heritage Month in Canada ==
A law named "Tamil Heritage Month Act, 2014" was passed by the Ontario government to proclaim January as Tamil heritage month. This law is for remembering, celebrating and educating future generations about the inspirational roles that Tamil Canadians have played. Bill 104 passed in January 2021 and establishes the week of May 18 as the Tamil Genocide Education Week in Ontario. This Bill was passed to encourage Ontario to learn more about the Tamil Genocide that occurred in Sri Lanka.

A unanimous decision was made at the House of Commons on October 5, 2016 declaring the month of January as Tamil Heritage Month under M-24. The motion will "recognize the contributions that Tamil-Canadians have made to Canadian society, the richness of the Tamil language and culture, and the importance of educating and reflecting upon Tamil heritage for future generations by declaring January, every year, Tamil Heritage Month.".

== Sports and literature ==
Canada has attracted a number of internationally renowned writers from Sri Lanka, including Shyam Selvadurai. Despite his family's relative privilege and urban base, his family left Sri Lanka because of the 1983 riots. Canadian Tamils have also contributed to the sports fields such as the formerly ranked Canadian tennis player Sonya Jeyaseelan and cricketer Sanjayan Thuraisingam. Pradeeban Peter-Paul multiple Guinness World Records holder Suresh Joachim Tamil Canadian table tennis player has been part of the Canadian National Team for the past 12 years. He was one of two Canadians who qualified to represent Canada at the 2008 Summer Olympics in Beijing, China. Soccer and cricket are two of the main sports played by the Tamil population in Canada.

== Cuisines ==
Tamil cuisine in Canada has been represented through several take-out, fast-food, and catering restaurants that have been operated by the Tamil diaspora since the 1980s, particularly in Toronto and Montreal. Dishes originating from all Tamil-speaking nations, including kothu roti, mutton rolls, idiyappam with coconut sambal, are popular among Tamil restaurants. Tamil cuisine is also represented by Indian restaurants in Canada which feature Tamil-origin dishes, such as idly, dosa, vada, and various vegetarian and non-vegetarian curries that originate from Tamil Nadu. Tamil flavours are also represented in Tamil fusion restaurants that serve dishes such as Jaffna French fries, mac and cheese rolls, and chilli chicken kothu roti.

== See also ==
- List of Eelam Tamils
- Federation of Tamil Sangams of North America
- List of Tamil-language radio stations
- In Our Translated World
