= Arumanai =

- Town
- Location in Tamil Nadu, India
- Coordinates: 8°22′46″N 77°14′26″E
- Country: India
- State: Tamil Nadu
- District: Kanyakumari

Area
  - Total: 10.5 km^{2} (4.1 sq mi)
- Elevation: 260 m (850 ft)

Population (2001)
  - Total: 14,576
  - Density: 1,390/km^{2} (3,600/sq mi)

Languages
  - Official: Tamil
  - Minority: Malayalam
- Time zone: UTC+5:30 (IST)
- PIN: 629151
- Area code: +91-4651
- Vehicle registration: TN 75

Arumanai or Arumana is a Panchayat town in Kanyakumari district in the state of Tamil Nadu, India. In olden days it is known as Arumana. The plot of critically acclaimed Malayalam language movie Ozhimuri is set in the background of Arumanai.

== Demographics ==
As of 2011 India census, Arumanai had a population of 16,283.

== Geography ==
The climatic condition in the town is as like Kerala because it borders near to Kerala. It is now a first grade panchayat town. The largest river of Kanyakumari district, the Kodayar, flows along the town's north-eastern and eastern boundary. Besides, two small brooks, the Kandasankadavu brook and Poovampara brook, (small tributaries of the Kodayar) flow through the town. Nedunkulam pond is another landmark near Arumanai.

== Economy ==
The town and its surroundings are very fertile and all species of flora of the West Coast grow here. However, the introduction of rubber cultivation in the hilly and semi-hilly areas of the district in the 1950s had marked a change in the utilization of the cultivable lands. Now rubber is raised as the main agricultural crop in almost all the villages and panchayat towns of Vilavancode taluk and Kalkulam taluks of the district. Arumana is in Vilavancode taluk and since it is very close to the foothills of the Western Ghats, all the available lands in the town have been used for raising rubber.

== Culture ==
The village has several temples and churches. The residents of Arumana celebrate the festivals, Vishu Kani, Onam, United Christmas celebration, Pongala festival of Nedunkulam Bhagavathi Amman kovil, Pongal festival and Diwali.

== Education ==
In and around Arumana there are lot of higher secondary, secondary and primary schools with medium of study as English, Tamil and Malayalam. HSC school Arumana, Govt HSC school Nediyasala. Good Samaritian primary School Arumanai, Christ International School, Malamary, and National matriculation school Panangara are the major schools located nearby Arumana.

It also has a college of Arts and Science namely Veluthampi Memorial College of Arts and Science which offers degree courses in disciplines such as Commerce, Computer science, English Literature Physics, Microbiology and Biotechnology. It has been affiliated to Manonmaniam Sundaranar University of Tirunelveli.

Government Public Library located in front of the Management Higher Secondary School Arumana.

== Adjacent communities ==
Arumana is surrounded by Manjalumoodu, Anducode, Karode, Vellamcode, Thiruvarambu, Kaliyal and Attoor.
