= Puttur, Sri Lanka =

Puttur புத்தூர்
- Town
- Location within Northern Province
- Coordinates: 9°44′0″N 80°06′0″E
- Country: Sri Lanka
- Province: Northern
- District: Jaffna
- DS Division: Valikamam East

Puttur (Tamil: புத்தூர், romanized: Puttūr) is a town in the north of Sri Lanka. It is located approximately 12 km from Jaffna.

== Etymology ==
The origin of the name Puttur is disputed. The suffix -ur clearly means town in Tamil, but the first part has different explanations.

The most commonly accepted one is the prefix "puthu" or "puthiya", which means new in Tamil. Hence the meaning is 'new town'. Another explanation is that the prefix origins from "putru", the Tamil word for snake hole, that acquires to the agricultural fields of the town. The last explanation for the reason of the name is the argument for a derivation of Buddha and -ur, that gradually has changed into Puttur.

== History ==
According to legends, the town of Puttur was established in ancient times.

== Education ==
One of the first Sri Lankan schools providing free education was established in Puttur. Malavarayar Kandiah established the J/Sri Somaskanda College in 1931, originally a Hindu-based college in Puttur. This was during the period when fee-charging Christian schools were dominant all over Sri Lanka during the British colonial rule.

== Landmarks ==
The Sivan Kovil, many Hindu establishments, the American mission run hospital are some of the landmarks of Puttur. Besides that, the ancient bottomless well Nilavarai near Puttur, is a regionally important tourist site.

There is an area in Puttur called Vatharavaththai. To that area drinking water going from the Annachaththiram-Puttur through the pipes for (6–9 km). This water supply scheme started by former president Piremadasa in late 70's.

== Culture ==
The annual Poongavanam festival held in friendly competition between Puttur Sivan Kovil and the neighbouring Avarangal Sivan Kovil were the climax of activities before the Sri Lankan Civil War started.

== See also ==
- Puttur, Dakshina Kannada district, Karnataka India
- Puttur, Chittoor district, Andhra Pradesh India
