= Thiruvarambu =

- town
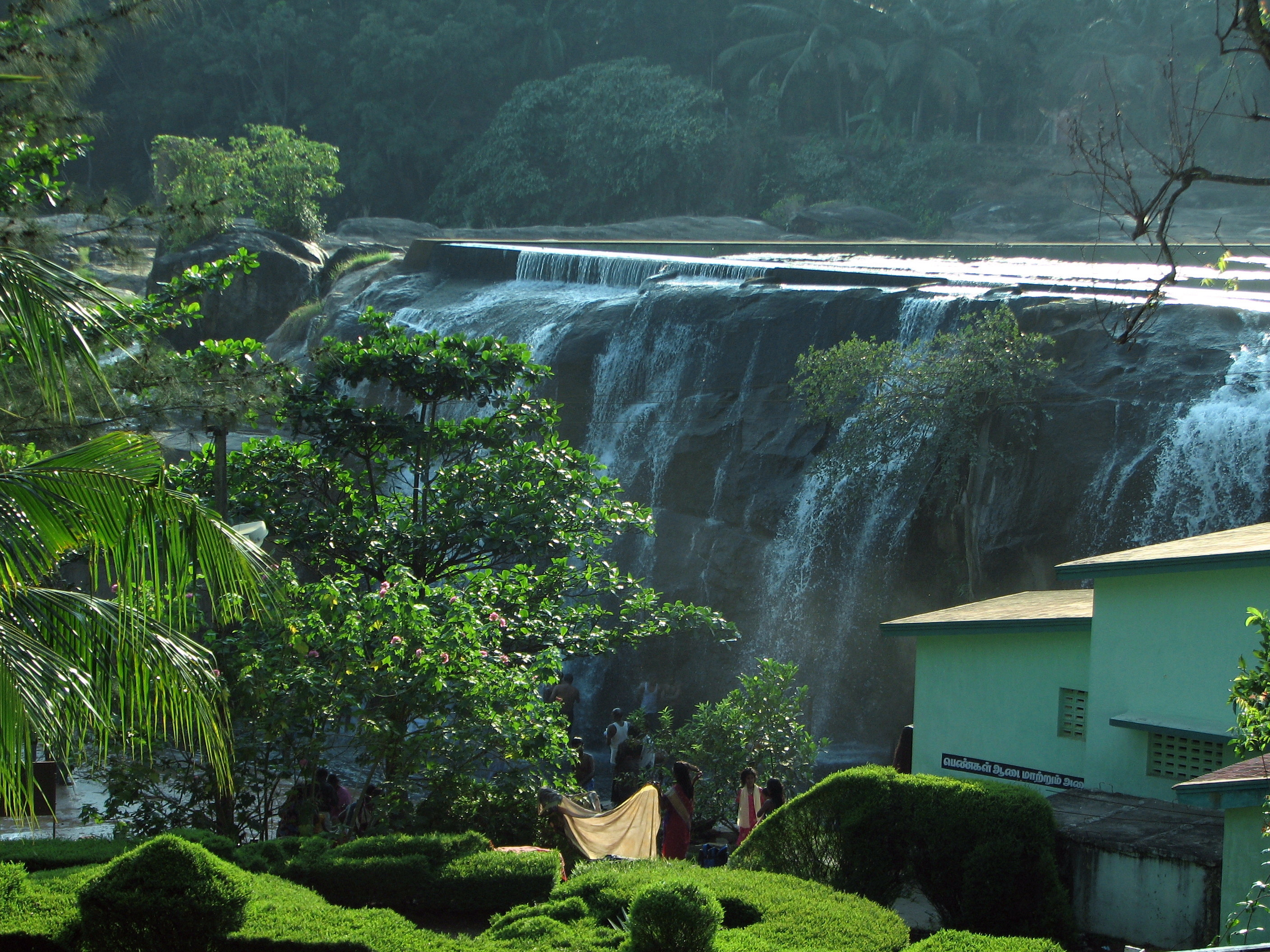
- Thirparappu waterfalls

- Location in Tamil Nadu, India Thiruvarambu (India)
- Coordinates: 8°21′50″N 77°15′55″E
- Country: India
- District: Kanyakumari

Languages
  - Official: Tamil, Malayalam
- Time zone: UTC+5:30 (IST)
- PIN: 629161
- Vehicle registration: TN 75
- Nearest city: Marthandam
- Lok Sabha constituency: Kanniyakumari
- Vidhan Sabha constituency: Padmanabhapuram

Thiruvarambu is a village in the town of Thiruvattar town panchyat, Tamil Nadu.

The Thirparappu Falls is 3 km from Thiruvarambu. This having a canal like stream originated from some of the dams (Pechiparai, Perunchani, Kodayar and so on) which provides more enough water to this village. Hence they plant banyan, coconut, banana, rubber, tapioca and other pulses such as pepper.

== Location and significance ==
Thiruvarambu is located 40 km south of the Thiruvananthapuram Metropolitan Region and 35 km from Nagercoil the nearest city. Thiruvarambu is only 12 km away from the commercial towns of Marthandam, 17 km from Thuckalay, 14 km from Kaliyikkavilai-Kerala State border. Two major motorways connect Thiruvarambu to Thiruvananthapuram; the National Highway 66 and the Vizhinjam Harbour - Beach Road. The Hill Road which runs through Nedumangadu is also used by some commuters due to heavy traffic congestion in the 2 main roads particularly during peak hours.

== Climate ==
Thiruvarambu has a same climate changes like Kerala. It has a climate that borders between a tropical savanna climate and a tropical monsoon climate. As a result, it does not experience distinct seasons. The mean maximum temperature 34 °C and the mean minimum temperature is 21 °C. The humidity is high and rises to about 90% during the monsoon season. The dry season sets in by December. December, January and February are the coolest months while March, April and May are the hottest. The lowest temperature in the city core recorded during winter was 16.4 °C on, and the highest temperature recorded in summer is 38.0 °C.[62]. It rains more often in Kanyakumari district than in any other part of Tamil Nadu, with the exception of Chennai.

== Standard of living ==
Like Thiruvananthapuram/Kerala, Thiruvarambu has high standards of living, top quality medical/educational facilities, low corruption rates and a very stable economy without industrialization activities. Remittances from the Middle East / North Africa / Europe / Singapore and Malaysia add to the steady economy of the region. Rubber plantations and trade constitute the majority of the business in Thiruvarambu. Almost everyone deals with rubber in their day-to-day life, as either planters or workers.

=== Train ===
The nearest railway station from Thiruvarambu is Kuzhithurai(KZT) which is just 12 km away. Several trains to Thiruvananthapuram, Nagercoil, Chennai, Madurai, and Mumbai are operated. One must reach Nagercoil(NCJ) or Thiruvananthapuram(TVC)for getting long-distance train and the trains which don't have halt in Kuzhithurai.

=== Air ===
Thiruvarambu is served by Thiruvananthapuram International Airport which is approximately 45 km away. Thiruvarambu Town is only 12 km away from the southern border of Thiruvananthapuram Metropolitan Region and hence considered one of its suburbs even though it lies across the state border. Both Kerala and Tamil Nadu government operates several bus services between the two cities apart from numerous private bus and taxi operators.

== Education ==
=== Medical colleges ===
- Sree RamaKrishna Medical College of Naturopathy and Yogic Sciences
- Sree Mookaambika Institute of Medical Sciences (SMIMS)
- Sarada Krishna Homeopathic Medical College

=== Dental colleges ===
- Sree Mookaambika Institute of Dental Sciences

=== Arts & science ===
- Sri Ramakrishna College of Education

=== Schools ===
- Thiruvarambu Government High School
- Calvary Matriculation School
- Mount Carmel Metric School
- St Johns English School

== Religion ==
The city has many Temples and Churches.

Churches:

- Church of South India, Kuruvikadu.
- Church of South India, Padagacheri.
- The Salvation Army Church, Kolvai(Kolvancheri).
- The Salvation Army Church, Thiruvarambu.
- St.Antony's Church, Thiruvarambu.
- Pentecostal Church, Pulichimavilai.
- Assemblies of God Church, Thiruvarambu.

Temples:

- Sree Aalumoodu Amman Temple, Thiruvarambu.
- Amman Temple, Padagacheri.
- Sivan Temple, Thiruvarambu.

== Festivals ==
The Hindu religious people celebrate Pongal, Deepavali, Saraswati Pooja, Ayutha Pooja, Sivarathri, and other deity festivals.

The Christians celebrate Christmas with United Christians Organization, Church Festivals, Easter and other related festivals. Dalits who live in this area celebrate Ambedkar Jeyanthi, Budh poornima, Ayyankali day and Rettaimalai seenivasan gurupooja.
