= List of Nematus species =

This is a list of 156 species in the genus Nematus, willow sawflies.

== Nematus species ==
- Nematus abbotii (Kirby, 1882)^{b}
- Nematus absconditus (Lindqvist, 1949)^{g}
- Nematus acuminalis Vikberg, 1982^{g}
- Nematus alberich Benson, 1934^{g}
- Nematus amaurus Vikberg, 1982^{g}
- Nematus angustiserra (Lindqvist, 1969)^{g}
- Nematus appalachia Smith, 2004^{b}
- Nematus asper (Lindqvist, 1959)^{g}
- Nematus aurantiacus Hartig, 1837^{g}
- Nematus bergamnni Dahlbom, 1835^{g}
- Nematus bergmanni Dahlbom, 1835^{g}
- Nematus bibartitus Serville, 1823^{g}
- Nematus bipartitus Serville, 1823^{g}
- Nematus bohemani Thomson, 1871^{g}
- Nematus boreophilus (Lindqvist, 1971)^{g}
- Nematus breviseta (Lindqvist, 1949)^{g}
- Nematus brevivalvis Thomson, 1871^{g}
- Nematus brunneus (Lindqvist, 1971)^{g}
- Nematus cadderensis Cameron, 1875^{g}
- Nematus caeruleocarpus Hartig, 1837^{g}
- Nematus calais ^{b}
- Nematus capito (Konow, 1903)^{g}
- Nematus carelicus Hellén, 1948^{g}
- Nematus caudalis (Lindqvist, 1968)^{g}
- Nematus clavicercus (Lindqvist, 1958)^{g}
- Nematus coeruleus Zinovjev, 1978^{g}
- Nematus connectus (Lindqvist, 1957)^{g}
- Nematus crassus (Fallén, 1808)^{g}
- Nematus curticornis (Lindqvist, 1969)^{g}
- Nematus dispar Zaddach, 1876^{g}
- Nematus disparoides (Lindqvist, 1969)^{g}
- Nematus dissimilis Foerster, 1854^{g}
- Nematus doebelii (Konow, 1904)^{g}
- Nematus dorsatus Cameron, 1876^{g}
- Nematus epimeris (Lindqvist, 1969)^{g}
- Nematus facialis (Lindqvist, 1969)^{g}
- Nematus fagi Zaddach, 1876^{g}
- Nematus fahraei Thomson, 1863^{g}
- Nematus ferrugineus Foerster, 1854^{g}
- Nematus flavescens Stephens, 1835^{g}
- Nematus flavominutissimus Haris, 2001^{g}
- Nematus frenalis Thomson, 1888^{g}
- Nematus fulvescens (Lindqvist, 1949)^{g}
- Nematus fulviventris (Lindqvist, 1957)^{g}
- Nematus fumosus Lacourt, 1991^{g}
- Nematus fuscomaculatus Foerster, 1854^{g}
- Nematus fusculus (Lindqvist, 1957)^{g}
- Nematus glaphyropus Dalla Torre, 1882^{g}
- Nematus gracilidentatus (Viitasaari, 1980)^{g}
- Nematus holmgreni (Lindqvist, 1968)^{g}
- Nematus hypoxanthus Foerster, 1854^{g}
- Nematus incompletus Foerster, 1854^{g}
- Nematus iridescens ^{b}
- Nematus jugicola Thomson^{g}
- Nematus kangasi (Lindqvist, 1964)^{g}
- Nematus latibasis (Lindqvist, 1949)^{g}
- Nematus lauroi (Lindqvist, 1960)^{g}
- Nematus leachii Dahlbom, 1835^{g}
- Nematus leionotus (Benson, 1933)^{g}
- Nematus leptocephalus Thomson, 1862^{g}
- Nematus leptostigma (Lindqvist, 1957)^{g}
- Nematus leucopyga (Lindqvist, 1949)^{g}
- Nematus leucotrochus Hartig, 1837^{g}
- Nematus lientericus Holmgren, 1883^{g}
- Nematus lindbergi (Lindqvist, 1957)^{g}
- Nematus lipovskyi ^{b} (azalea sawfly)
- Nematus longispinis Kriechbaumer, 1885^{g}
- Nematus lonicerae (Weiffenbach, 1957)^{g}
- Nematus lucens (Enslin, 1918)^{g}
- Nematus lucidus Panzer, 1801^{g}
- Nematus maculifrons (Lindqvist, 1960)^{g}
- Nematus majusculus Lacourt, 1991^{g}
- Nematus melanaspis Hartig, 1840^{g}
- Nematus melanocephalus Hartig, 1837^{g}
- Nematus melanochrous (Lindqvist, 1969)^{g}
- Nematus microserratus (Lindqvist, 1941)^{g}
- Nematus miliaris (Panzer, 1797)^{g}
- Nematus mimus (Konow, 1903)^{g}
- Nematus monticola Thomson, 1871^{g}
- Nematus mucronatus Hartig, 1837^{g}
- Nematus myosotidis (Fabricius, 1804)^{g}
- Nematus nigirtus (Lindqvist, 1957)^{g}
- Nematus nigricornis Serville, 1823^{g}
- Nematus nigritus (Lindqvist, 1957)^{g}
- Nematus nigriventris Holmgren, 1883^{g}
- Nematus nigrtus (Lindqvist, 1957)^{g}
- Nematus nitidus (Lindqvist, 1969)^{g}
- Nematus notabilis (Konow, 1903)^{g}
- Nematus nubium (Benson, 1935)^{g}
- Nematus nuortevai (Lindqvist, 1957)^{g}
- Nematus olfaciens Benson, 1953^{g}
- Nematus oligospilus Foerster, 1854^{g b}
- Nematus ostryae ^{b}
- Nematus pallens (Konow, 1903)^{g}
- Nematus pallidinervis (Hellén, 1951)^{g}
- Nematus palliditarsis Vameron, 1875^{g}
- Nematus papillosus (Retzius, 1783)^{g}
- Nematus parviserratus (Lindqvist, 1944)^{g}
- Nematus parvulus Holmgren, 1883^{g}
- Nematus pavidus Serville, 1823^{g}
- Nematus peltoneni (Lindqvist, 1969)^{g}
- Nematus platystigma (Lindqvist, 1949)^{g}
- Nematus pleurosticta (Förster, 1854)^{g}
- Nematus poecilonotus Zaddach, 1876^{g}
- Nematus polaris Holmgren, 1883^{g}
- Nematus politus (Lindqvis, 1974)^{g}
- Nematus pravus (Konow, 1895)^{g}
- Nematus princeps Zaddach, 1876^{g}
- Nematus pseudodispar (Lindqvist, 1969)^{g}
- Nematus putoni (Konow, 1903)^{g}
- Nematus quietus Eversmann, 1847^{g}
- Nematus renei (Lindqvist, 1957)^{g}
- Nematus respondens Foerster, 1854^{g}
- Nematus reticulatus Holmgren, 1883^{g}
- Nematus ribesicola (Lindqvist, 1949)^{g}
- Nematus ribesii (Scopoli)^{i c g b} (imported currantworm)
- Nematus rutilipes (Lindqvist, 1959)^{g}
- Nematus salicis (Linnaeus, 1758)^{g}
- Nematus scotonotus Foerster, 1854^{g}
- Nematus semiopacus (Lindqvist, 1957)^{g}
- Nematus semipunctatus (Lindqvist, 1957)^{g}
- Nematus seriepunctatus (Malaise, 1921)^{g}
- Nematus similator Foerster, 1854^{g}
- Nematus sordiapex (Lindqvist, 1959)^{g}
- Nematus sordidiapex (Lindqvist, 1959)^{g}
- Nematus spiraeae Zaddach, 1883^{g}
- Nematus stichi (Enslin, 1913)^{g}
- Nematus stramineipes (Lindqvist, 1957)^{g}
- Nematus striatipleuris (Lindqvist, 1957)^{g}
- Nematus subflavus (Lindqvist, 1957)^{g}
- Nematus sylvestris Cameron, 1884^{g}
- Nematus tataricus Zinovjev, 1978^{g}
- Nematus tegularis (Lindqvist, 1969)^{g}
- Nematus tenuitarsis (Konow, 1901)^{g}
- Nematus thunebergi (Lindqvist, 1959)^{g}
- Nematus tibialis Newman, 1837^{g b} (locust sawfly)
- Nematus togatus Zaddach, 1876^{g}
- Nematus torneensis (Malaise, 1920)^{g}
- Nematus trisignatus Förster, 1854^{g}
- Nematus truncus Vikberg, 1982^{g}
- Nematus tulunensis Vikberg, 1972^{g}
- Nematus umbratus Thomson, 1871^{g}
- Nematus vaccinii (Lindqvist, 1964)^{g}
- Nematus variegatus (Lindqvist, 1957)^{g}
- Nematus vastatrix (Zhelochovtsev, 1935)^{g}
- Nematus ventralis Say^{i c g b} (willow sawfly)
- Nematus verticalis (Lindqvist, 1957)^{g}
- Nematus vicinus Serville, 1823^{g}
- Nematus villosus Thomson, 1862^{g}
- Nematus viridis Stephens, 1835^{g}
- Nematus viridissimus Möller, 1882^{g}
- Nematus wahlbergi Thomson, 1871^{g}
- Nematus wolteri (Lindqvist, 1957)^{g}
- Nematus woollatti (Lindqvist, 1971)^{g}
- Nematus xanthogaster Förster, 1854^{g}
- Nematus zaddachi (Enslin, 1916)^{g}

Data sources: i = ITIS, c = Catalogue of Life, g = GBIF, b = Bugguide.net
