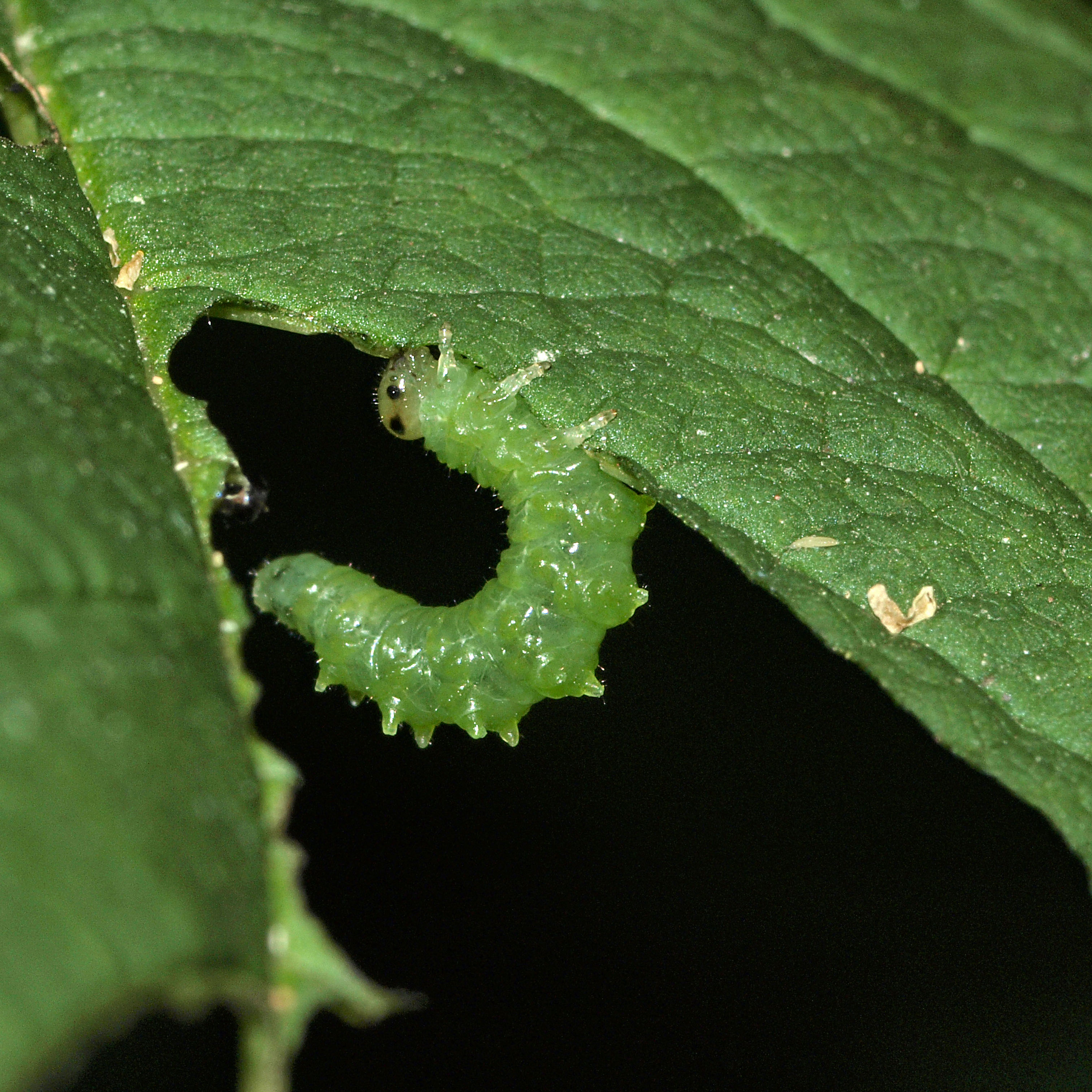
- Larva after last moult

Scientific classification
- Domain: Eukaryota
- Kingdom: Animalia
- Phylum: Arthropoda
- Class: Insecta
- Order: Hymenoptera
- Suborder: Symphyta
- Family: Tenthredinidae
- Subfamily: Nematinae
- Genus: Nematus
- Species: N. spiraeae

Binomial name
- Nematus spiraeae Zaddach, 1883

= Nematus spiraeae =

Aruncus sawfly

Species of sawfly

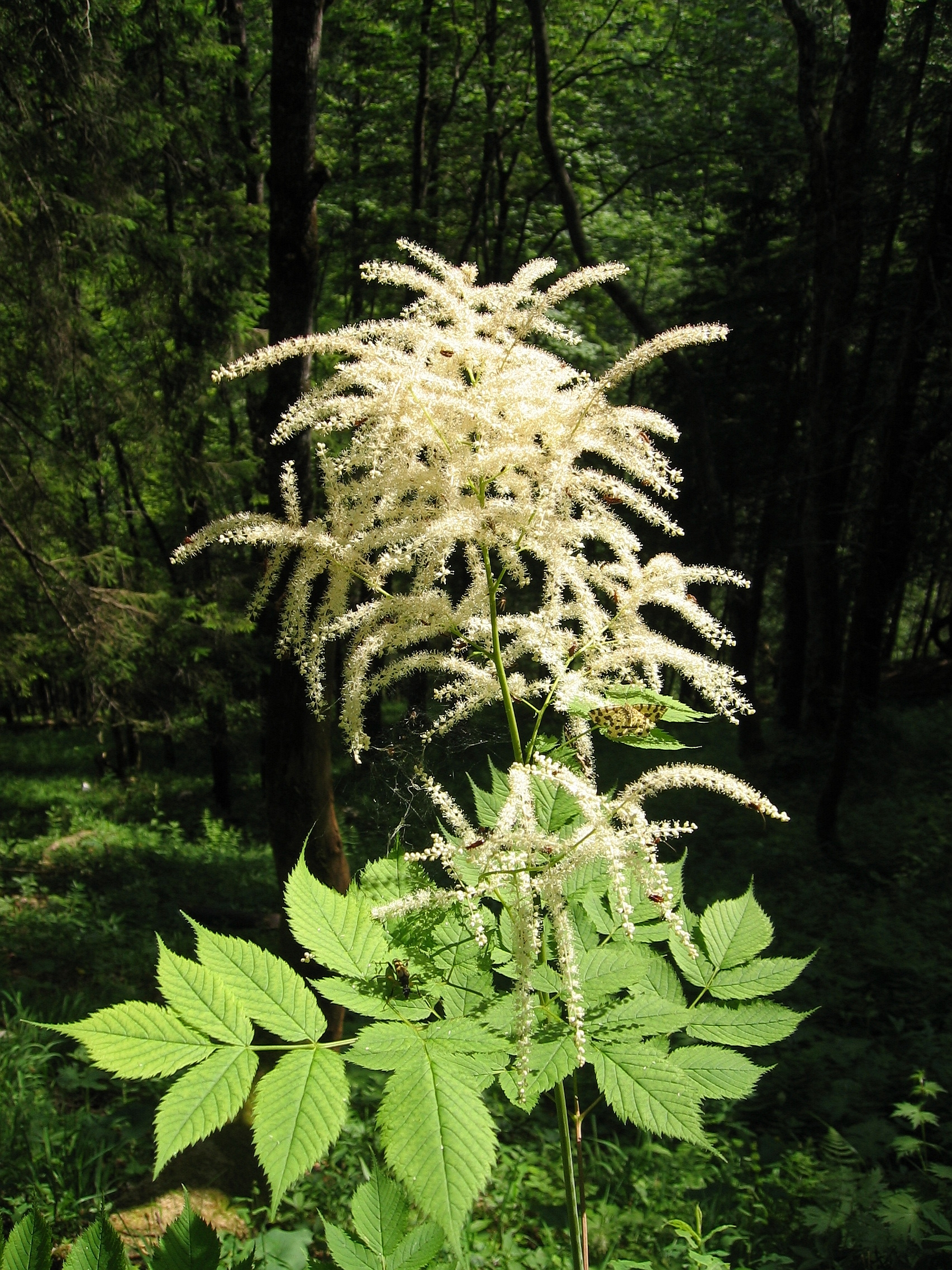
Goat's beard (Aruncus dioicus)

Nematus spiraeae is a species of sawfly in the family Tenthredinidae, known as the aruncus sawfly and sometimes the spiraea sawfly. It is native to central and northern Europe and was first recorded in Britain in 1924. Its larvae feed on the leaves of goat's beard (Aruncus dioicus).

== Description ==
The adult aruncus sawfly is between 5 and 6 mm (0.20 and 0.24 in) long. The antennae, head and thorax are brownish-black and the abdomen yellowish-brown, the underside being paler than the upper side. The wings are membranous with brown veins and the tegulae are pale-coloured. Larvae grow to 20 mm (0.8 in) long; they are a translucent green and have short, pale hairs growing from low warts. The head is greenish-brown to brown. Eggs are capsule-shaped, white and about 1 mm (0.04 in) long.

== Life cycle ==
Aruncus sawflies are all females, breeding by parthenogenesis. The adults emerge in late spring and eggs are laid on the underside of the leaves of goat's beard (Aruncus dioicus) shortly afterwards. Eggs hatch a week later, releasing gregarious larvae, which consume leaf tissue between the main veins. Metamorphosis occurs after four or five weeks in the soil, each pupa protected by silken cocoons. Adults emerge in late July and August producing a second generation of larvae, and occasionally a third generation. Those larvae descend to the ground late in the year, overwinter as pre-pupae, and pupate in the spring.

== Damage and control ==
In heavy infestations, leaves may be skeletonized except for their main veins, and the plants may become completely defoliated. The larvae can be picked off by hand, or in heavier infestations, chemical pesticides can be used. Organic products such as pyrethrum will control small larvae but more powerful synthetic insecticides are needed when the larvae are large.
