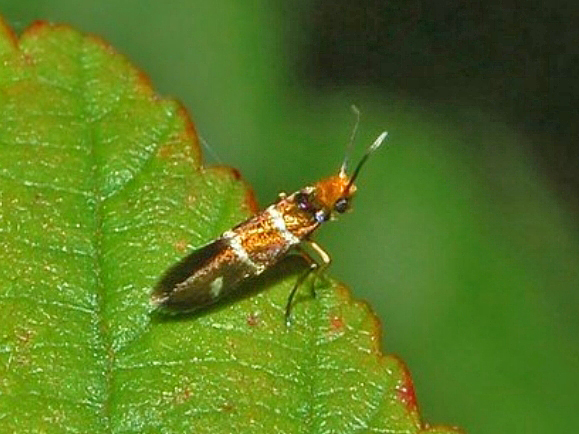

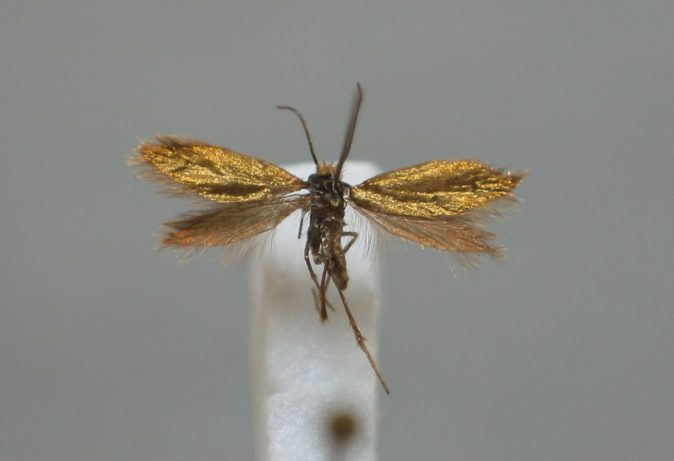

Scientific classification
- Kingdom: Animalia
- Phylum: Arthropoda
- Clade: Pancrustacea
- Class: Insecta
- Order: Lepidoptera
- Family: Micropterigidae
- Genus: Micropterix
- Species: M. aruncella

Binomial name
- Micropterix aruncella (Scopoli, 1763)

Synonyms
- List: Phalaena aruncella Scopoli, 1763; Tinea seppella Fabricius, 1777; Tinea podevinella Hübner, 1813; Lampronia concinnella; Micropteryx eximiella Zeller, 1850; Eriocephala atricapilla Wocke, 1877; Micropteryx nuraghella Amsel, 1936

= Micropterix aruncella =

Species of moth

Micropterix aruncella is a species of moth belonging to the family Micropterigidae, which is distributed throughout Europe. The imago was first described by Giovanni Antonio Scopoli in 1763. This species is one of the best known members of the family, being found in a wide range of habitats from sea level to over 2,000 metres (6,600 ft); the only habitat not favoured by this species is dense woodland.

== Description ==
This very small moth has a maximum forewing length of only 4 millimetres (0.16 in). Their wingspan is 6 millimetres (0.24 in) or 7 millimetres (0.28 in). The colour of the forewings is rather variable but is usually reddish golden. Females usually have no other markings but males are marked with two silvery white bands.

== Ecology ==
Males feeding on pollen grains

Like other members of the family, this species has functional jaws and it feeds as an adult on pollen grains from a wide variety of flowers including those of hawthorn (Crataegus species), Cytisus, Lychnis, pine (Pinus species), Plantago, rose (Rosa species), nettle (Urtica species) and Veronica as well as numerous grasses. Depending on elevation and latitude, the adults may be encountered in daytime from May to August. They can be found in various habitats and dry habitats including downland and hillsides.

== Similar species ==
The females are similar to Micropterix calthella but has the whole base of the forewing purple, compared with M. calthella which has a purple patch on the base of the costa (although calthella often has purple suffusion scattered over the forewing). In Britain both species can be found, during the day, on creeping buttercup (Ranunculus repens), but the UKmoths website recommends searching the lower flowers of hawthorn Crataegus monogyna for M. aruncella.

Larva

The larva feeds on detritus at the base of herbaceous plants before pupating in a tough cocoon.

== Distribution ==
Found throughout mainland Europe except Bulgaria and Portugal.

== Taxonomy ==
The name Micropterix was raised by the German entomologist, Jacob Hübner in 1825 and comes from the Greek for mikros – little, and pterux – a wing. The specific name aruncella refers to the plant, goat's beard (Spiraea aruncus), on which moths have been found feeding on the pollen.
