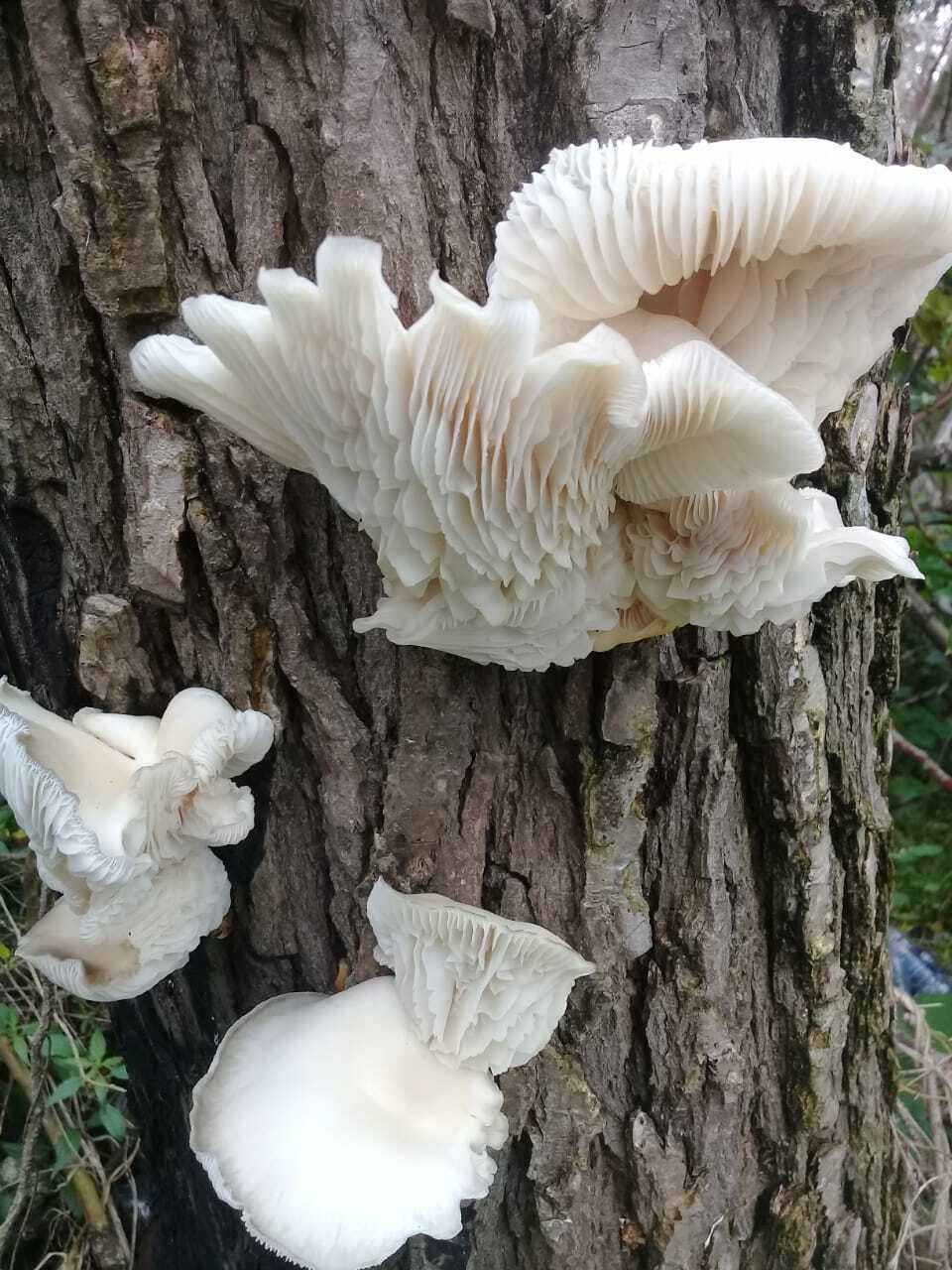

Conservation status
- Near Threatened (IUCN 3.1)

Scientific classification
- Kingdom: Fungi
- Division: Basidiomycota
- Class: Agaricomycetes
- Order: Agaricales
- Family: Pleurotaceae
- Genus: Pleurotus
- Species: P. albidus

Binomial name
- Pleurotus albidus (Berk.) Pegler 1983

Synonyms
- Pleurotus calvescens (Berk.) Singer 1957; Pleurotus laciniatocrenatus (Speg.) Speg. 1919; Dendrosarcus jacksonii (Berk. & Cooke) Kuntze 1898; Pocillaria laciniatocrenata (Speg.) Kuntze 1898; Pocillaria calvescens (Berk.) Kuntze 1891; Pocillaria albida (Berk.) Kuntze 1891; Pleurotus jacksonii (Berk. & Cooke) Sacc. 1887; Agaricus laciniatocrenatus (Speg.) Speg. 1883; Panus crenatolobatus Speg. 1880; Panus laciniatocrenatus Speg. 1880; Agaricus jacksonii Berk. & Cooke 1877; Lentinus calvescens Berk. 1856; Lentinus albidus Berk. 1843

= Pleurotus albidus =

Species of fungus

Pleurotus albidus is a species of edible fungus in the family Pleurotaceae. Found in Caribbean, Central America and South America, it was described as new to science by Miles Joseph Berkeley, and given its current name by David Norman Pegler in 1983. It grows on trees such as Salix humboldtiana, other willows, Populus and Araucaria angustifolia, and can be cultivated by humans. Phylogenetic research has shown that while it belongs to P. ostreatus clade, it forms its own intersterility group.

== See also ==
- List of Pleurotus species
