= Goatsbeard =

Goatsbeard or Goat's beard is a common name for several plants and may refer to:

- Aruncus, in the family Rosaceae
- Tragopogon, in the family Asteraceae
- Astilbe, some species of which are known as "False Goat's Beard"
