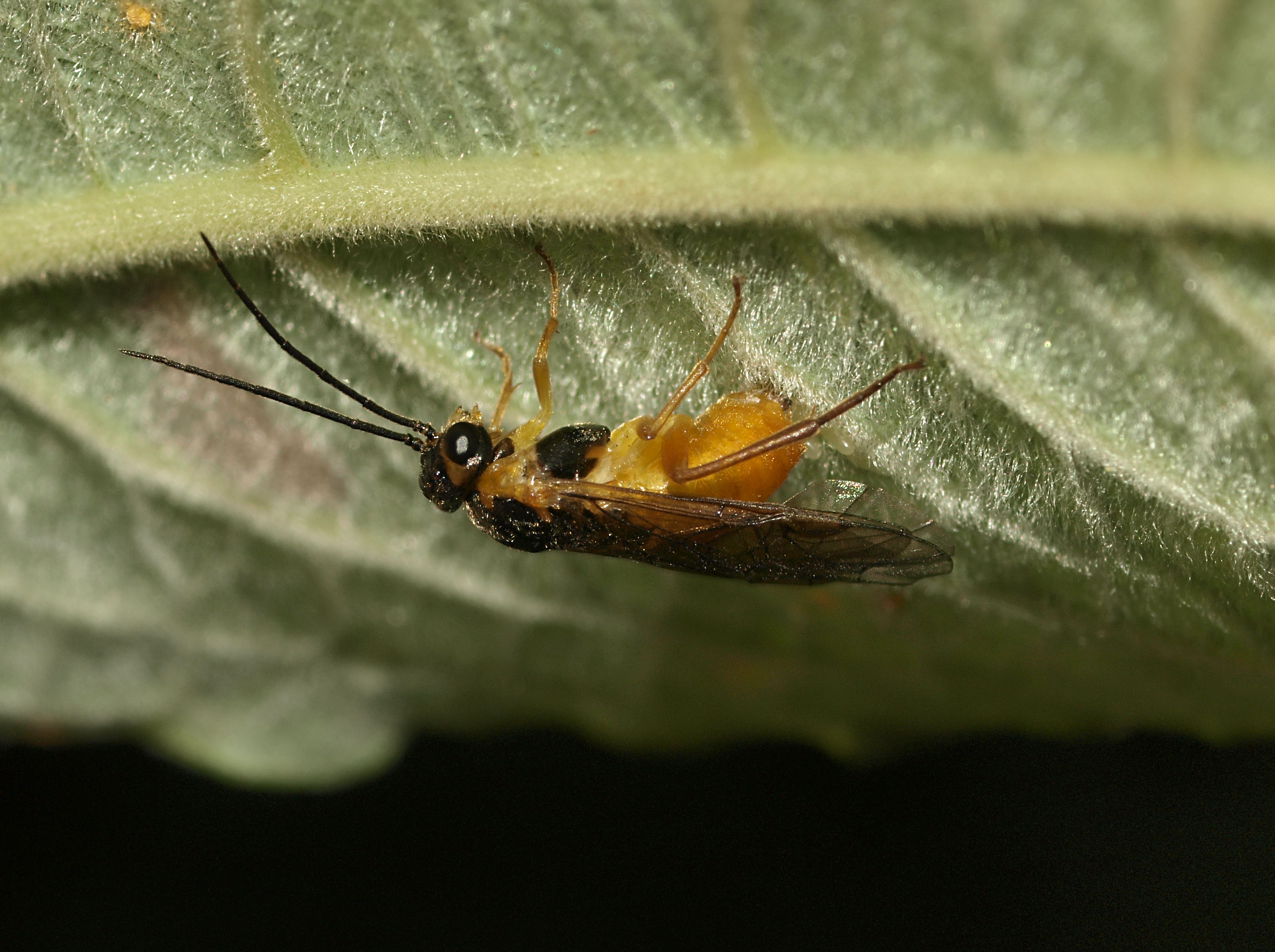
- Nematus pavidus Denmark

Scientific classification
- Kingdom: Animalia
- Phylum: Arthropoda
- Class: Insecta
- Order: Hymenoptera
- Suborder: Symphyta
- Family: Tenthredinidae
- Genus: Nematus
- Species: N. pavidus

Binomial name
- Nematus pavidus Serville, 1823

Synonyms
- Cryptocampus quadrum A.Costa, 1859; Euura pavida (Audinet-Serville, 1823); Hypolaepus pavidus (Audinet-Serville, 1823); Nematus cameronii Dalla Torre, 1894; Nematus ochraceus Hartig, 1837; Nematus semiorbitalis Förster, 1854; Nematus wittewaalli Snellen Van Vollenhoven, 1862; Nematus wttewaali Vollenhoven, 1862; Pteronidea pavidus Lepeltier, 1823; Pteronus pavidus (Lepeletier, 1823)

= Nematus pavidus =

Species of sawfly

Nematus pavidus is a Palearctic species of sawfly.
