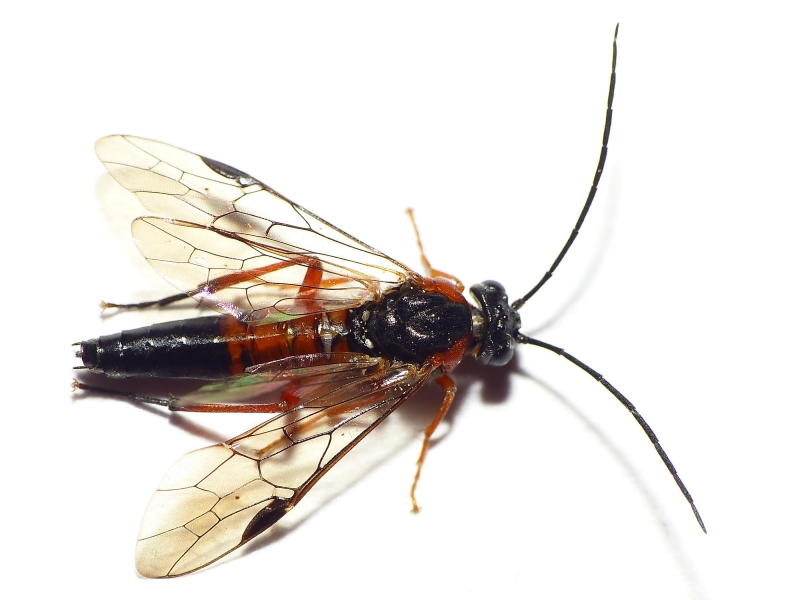
- Nematus lucidus Wageningen, the Netherlands

Scientific classification
- Domain: Eukaryota
- Kingdom: Animalia
- Phylum: Arthropoda
- Class: Insecta
- Order: Hymenoptera
- Suborder: Symphyta
- Family: Tenthredinidae
- Genus: Nematus
- Species: N. lucidus

Binomial name
- Nematus lucidus (Panzer, 1801)

= Nematus lucidus =

Species of sawfly

Nematus lucidus is a Palearctic species of sawfly.
