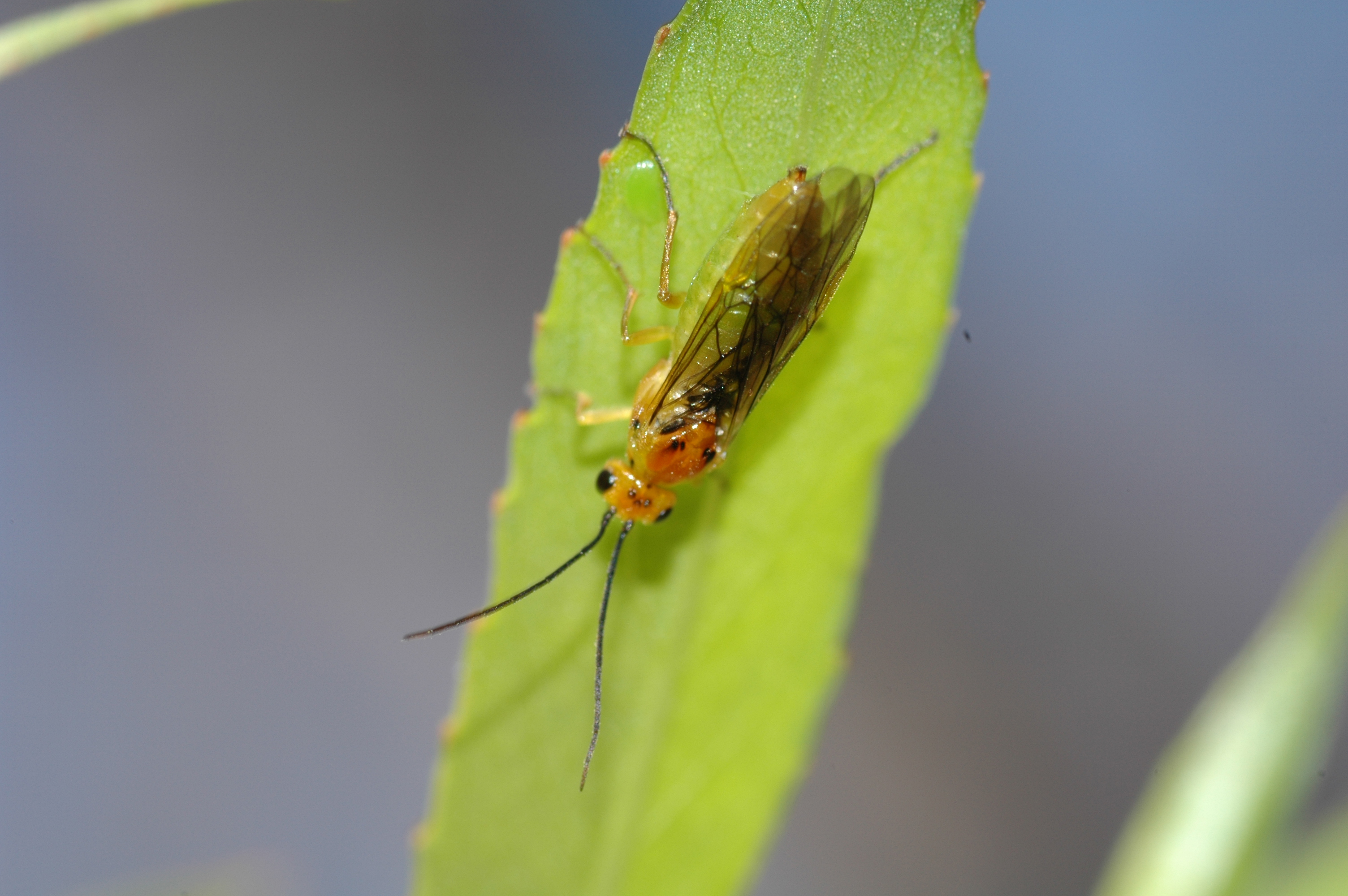
- Adult

Scientific classification
- Domain: Eukaryota
- Kingdom: Animalia
- Phylum: Arthropoda
- Class: Insecta
- Order: Hymenoptera
- Suborder: Symphyta
- Family: Tenthredinidae
- Subfamily: Nematinae
- Genus: Nematus
- Species: N. oligospilus

Binomial name
- Nematus oligospilus Förster, 1854

Synonyms
- Nematus desantisi

= Nematus oligospilus =

Willow sawfly

Species of sawfly

Nematus oligospilus, commonly known as the willow sawfly, is a species of sawfly in the family Tenthredinidae. Native to central and northern Europe and Asia, it was first recorded in South America in the 1980s and New Zealand in 1997, and has also been introduced to Australia, South Africa and Lesotho. Its larvae feed on the leaves of various species of willow.

== Description ==
An adult is between 8 and 10 mm (0.3 and 0.4 in) long. It is a slender insect with two pairs of membranous wings with black veins, the fore-wings having a yellow leading edge. The head bears a pair of long antennae, a pair of black compound eyes and three ocelli. The sides of the thorax are pale yellowish-brown while the dorsal surface is mid-brown. The abdomen is greenish and the legs are yellowish-brown at the base and darker brown near the clawed tips. The larva resembles a lepidopteran caterpillar; it has a white head with brown markings, a green body, three pairs of true legs near the front and seven pairs of pro-legs behind.

== Distribution ==
The willow sawfly is widespread in the Holarctic region and has spread to other parts of the world. It was recorded in South America for the first time in the 1980s, in Argentina and Chile where it caused severe defoliation of various species of willow (Salix). In 2017 it was recorded in Colombia on the ornamental willow Salix humboldtiana. It had reached New Zealand by 1997 and was also present around this time in Australia. In both of these countries it spread rapidly, with the larvae feeding on species of willow, which are not native plants in Australia and New Zealand. It has also been found in South Africa and Lesotho.

== Life cycle ==
Eggs are laid on the leaves of the host tree, and the developing larvae feed on the leaf tissue. Larvae have a variable number of instar stages and fall to the ground when fully developed. They make their way underground and overwinter as non-feeding prepupae in the cocoons they form. However, in Colombia it was found that larvae remain on the tree and form their cocoons there; these are green and easily overlooked among the foliage. The prepupae pupate in the spring, the adults emerging when new foliage is available. Adults each lay about thirty eggs soon after emerging.

In South America, all adults are female and reproduction is by parthenogenesis. The same is true in other parts of the Southern Hemisphere where it has been introduced, but in its native range in the Northern Hemisphere, both males and females occur. Shifting from sexual to parthenogenetic reproduction is fairly common in invasive species and offers several advantages. The small number of individuals initially introduced into a new habitat would make it difficult for sexual partners to find each other. Also, a population that is all female can potentially expand at twice the maximum rate of a population with two sexes, allowing an invasive species to establish itself more rapidly. Sexual reproduction with its usual advantage of genetic recombination is not as favored in invasive populations, which lack predators.
