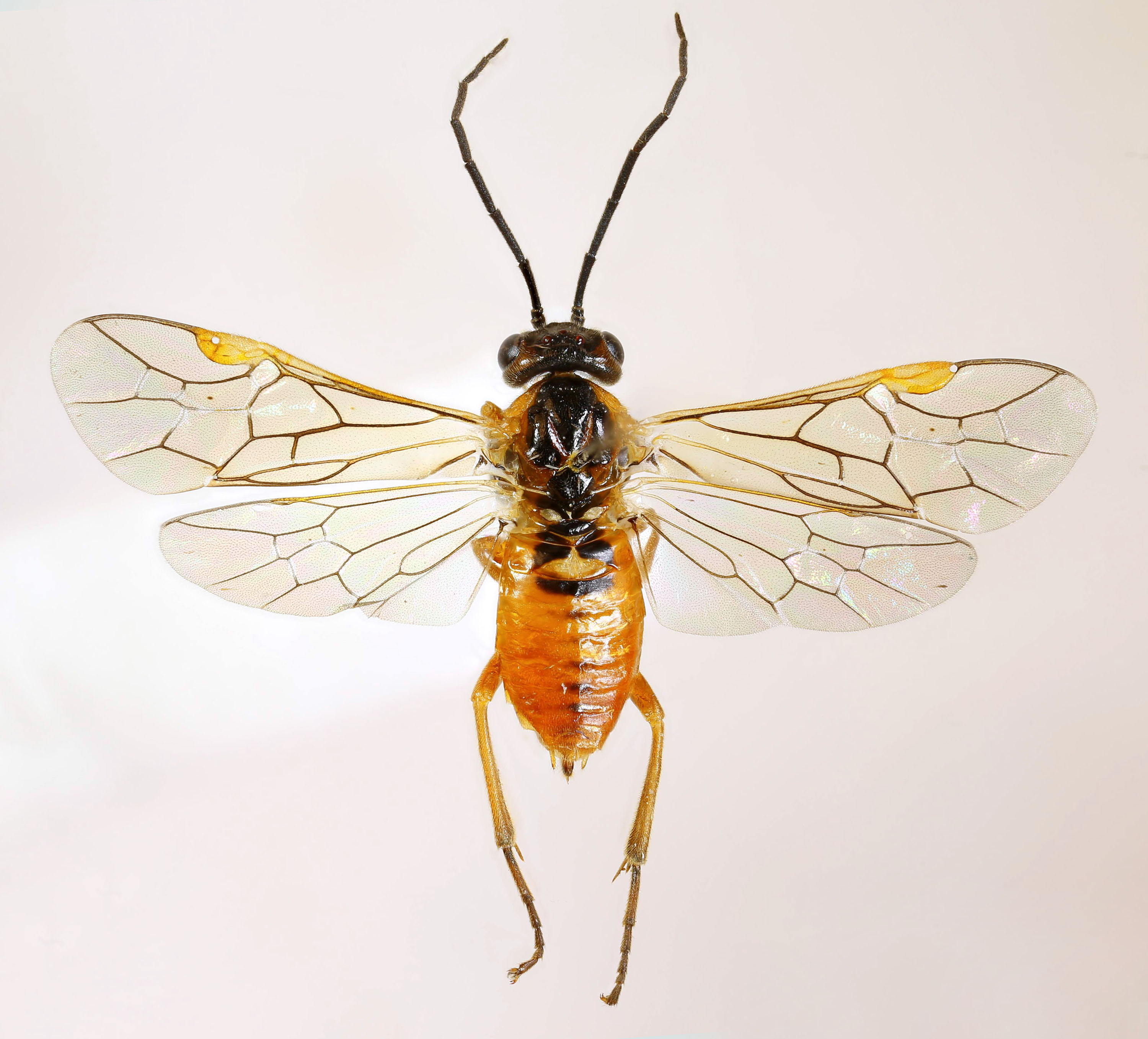
- Nematus myosotidis female North Wales

Scientific classification
- Domain: Eukaryota
- Kingdom: Animalia
- Phylum: Arthropoda
- Class: Insecta
- Order: Hymenoptera
- Suborder: Symphyta
- Family: Tenthredinidae
- Genus: Nematus
- Species: N. myosotidis

Binomial name
- Nematus myosotidis (Fabricius, 1804)

= Nematus myosotidis =

Species of sawfly

Nematus myosotidis is a Palearctic species of sawfly.
