= Nematus ventralis =

Scientific classification
- Domain: Eukaryota
- Kingdom: Animalia
- Phylum: Arthropoda
- Class: Insecta
- Order: Hymenoptera
- Suborder: Symphyta
- Family: Tenthredinidae
- Genus: Nematus
- Species: N. ventralis

Binomial name
- Nematus ventralis Say

Species of sawfly

Nematus ventralis, the willow sawfly, is a species of common sawfly in the family Tenthredinidae.
