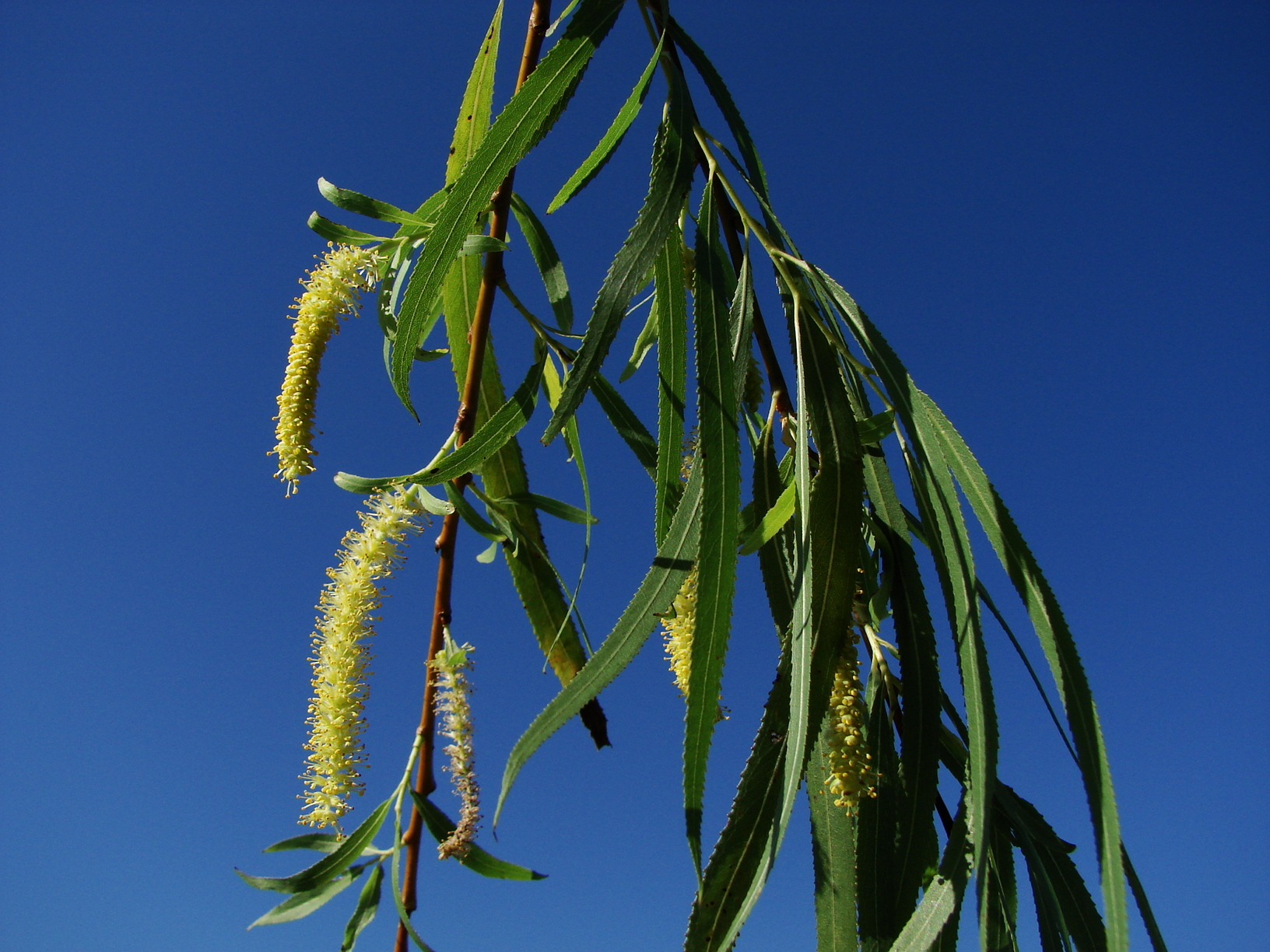

Scientific classification
- Kingdom: Plantae
- Clade: Embryophytes
- Clade: Tracheophytes
- Clade: Spermatophytes
- Clade: Angiosperms
- Clade: Eudicots
- Clade: Rosids
- Order: Malpighiales
- Family: Salicaceae
- Genus: Salix
- Species: S. chilensis

Binomial name
- Salix chilensis Molina

Synonyms
- List: Pleiarina humboldtiana (Willd.) Raf.; Salix chilensis var. crispa Stuck. ex Seckt; Salix humboldtiana Willd.; Salix humboldtiana var. stipulacea (M.Martens & Galeotti) C.K.Schneid.; Salix magellanica Poir.; Salix stipulacea M.Martens & Galeotti

= Salix chilensis =

Species of plant

Salix chilensis, the Chilean pencil willow, is a species of willow native to Mexico, Central America and South America, described by Molina in 1782. Some authorities consider it conspecific with Salix humboldtiana, which Willdenow described in 1805.
