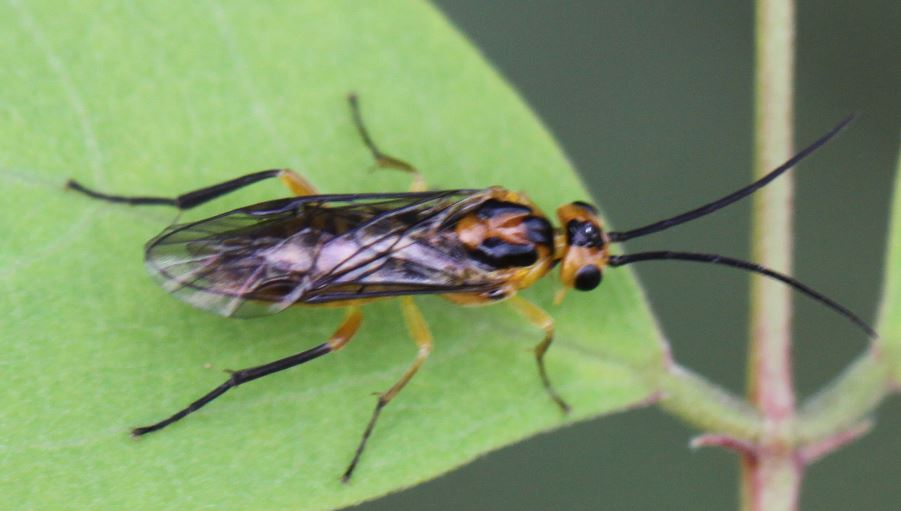

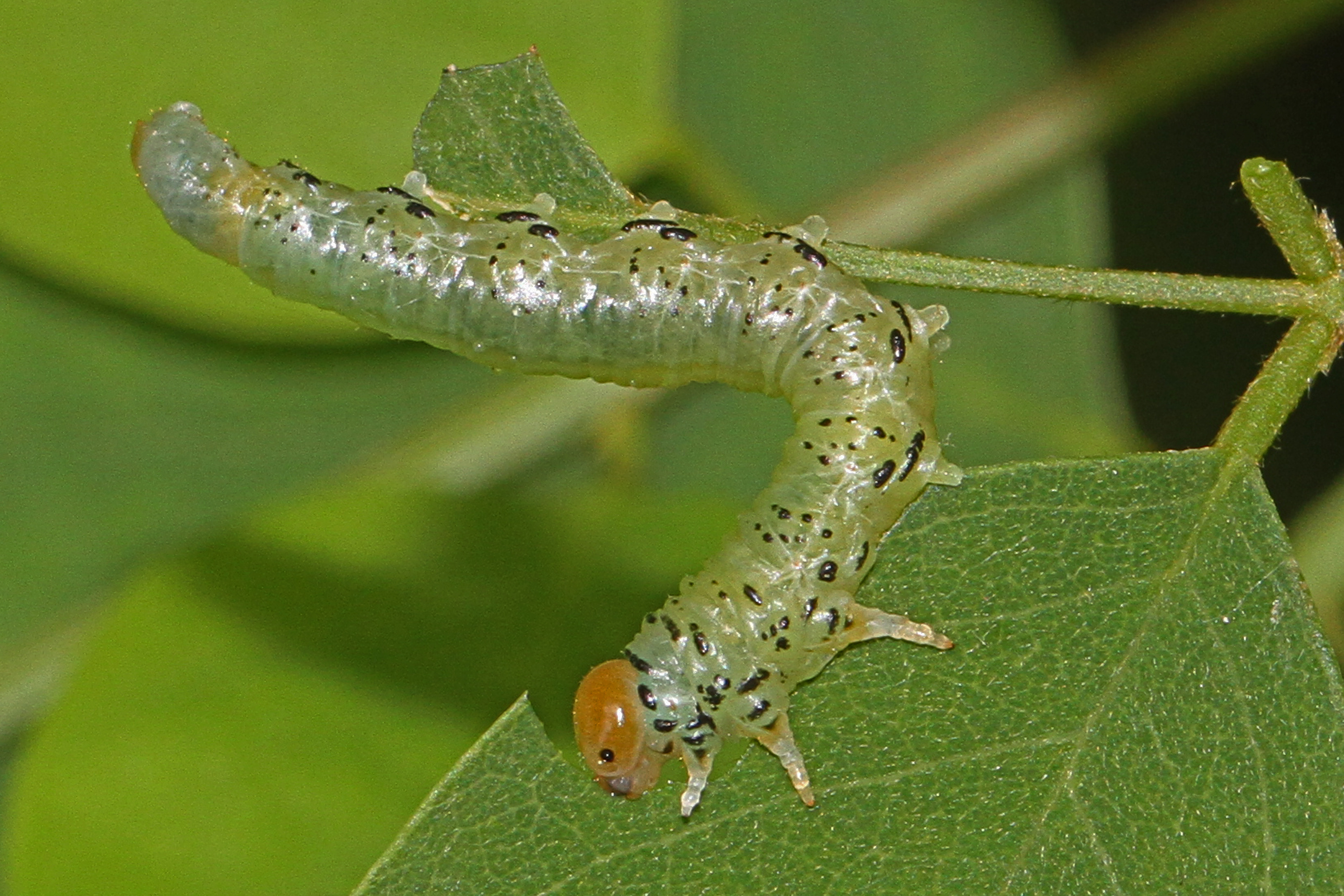
- Adult (top) and larva (bottom)

Scientific classification
- Domain: Eukaryota
- Kingdom: Animalia
- Phylum: Arthropoda
- Class: Insecta
- Order: Hymenoptera
- Suborder: Symphyta
- Family: Tenthredinidae
- Genus: Nematus
- Species: N. tibialis

Binomial name
- Nematus tibialis Newman, 1837

Synonyms
- Euura tibialis (Newman, 1837)

= Nematus tibialis =

Species of sawfly

Nematus tibialis, known generally as the locust sawfly or false acacia sawfly, is a species of common sawfly in the family Tenthredinidae.
