= Parthenogenesis =

Asexual reproduction without fertilization

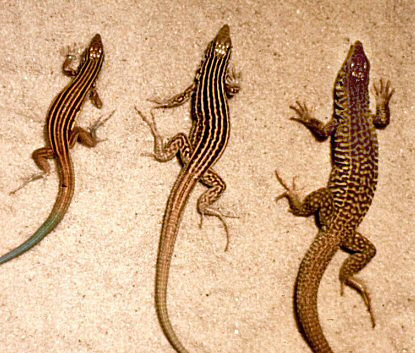
The asexual, all-female whiptail species Aspidoscelis neomexicanus (center), which reproduces via parthenogenesis, is shown flanked by two sexual species having males, A. inornatus (left) and A. tigris (right), which naturally hybridized to form A. neomexicanus.

Parthenogenesis (/ˌpɑːrθɪnoʊˈdʒɛnɪsɪs, -θɪnə-/; from the Greek παρθένος, parthénos, 'virgin' + γένεσις, génesis, 'creation') is a natural form of asexual reproduction in which the embryo develops directly without need for fertilization. In animals, parthenogenesis means the development of an embryo from an unfertilized egg cell. Parthenogenesis occurs naturally in some plants and animals, and in a few other eukaryotes such as oomycetes. It has been induced artificially in some mammals.

Normal egg cells form in the process of meiosis and are haploid, with half as many chromosomes as their mother's body cells. Haploid individuals, however, are usually non-viable, and parthenogenetic offspring usually have the diploid chromosome number. Depending on the mechanism involved in restoring the diploid number of chromosomes, parthenogenetic offspring may have anything between all and half of the mother's alleles. In some types of parthenogenesis, the offspring that have all of the mother's genetic material are called full clones and those having only half are called half clones. Full clones are usually formed without meiosis. If meiosis occurs, the offspring get only a fraction of the mother's alleles, since crossing over of DNA takes place during meiosis, creating variation.

Parthenogenetic offspring in species that use either the XY or the XO sex-determination system have two X chromosomes and are female. In species that use the ZW sex-determination system, they have either two Z chromosomes (male) or two W chromosomes (mostly non-viable but rarely a female), or they could have one Z and one W chromosome (female).

== Life history types ==
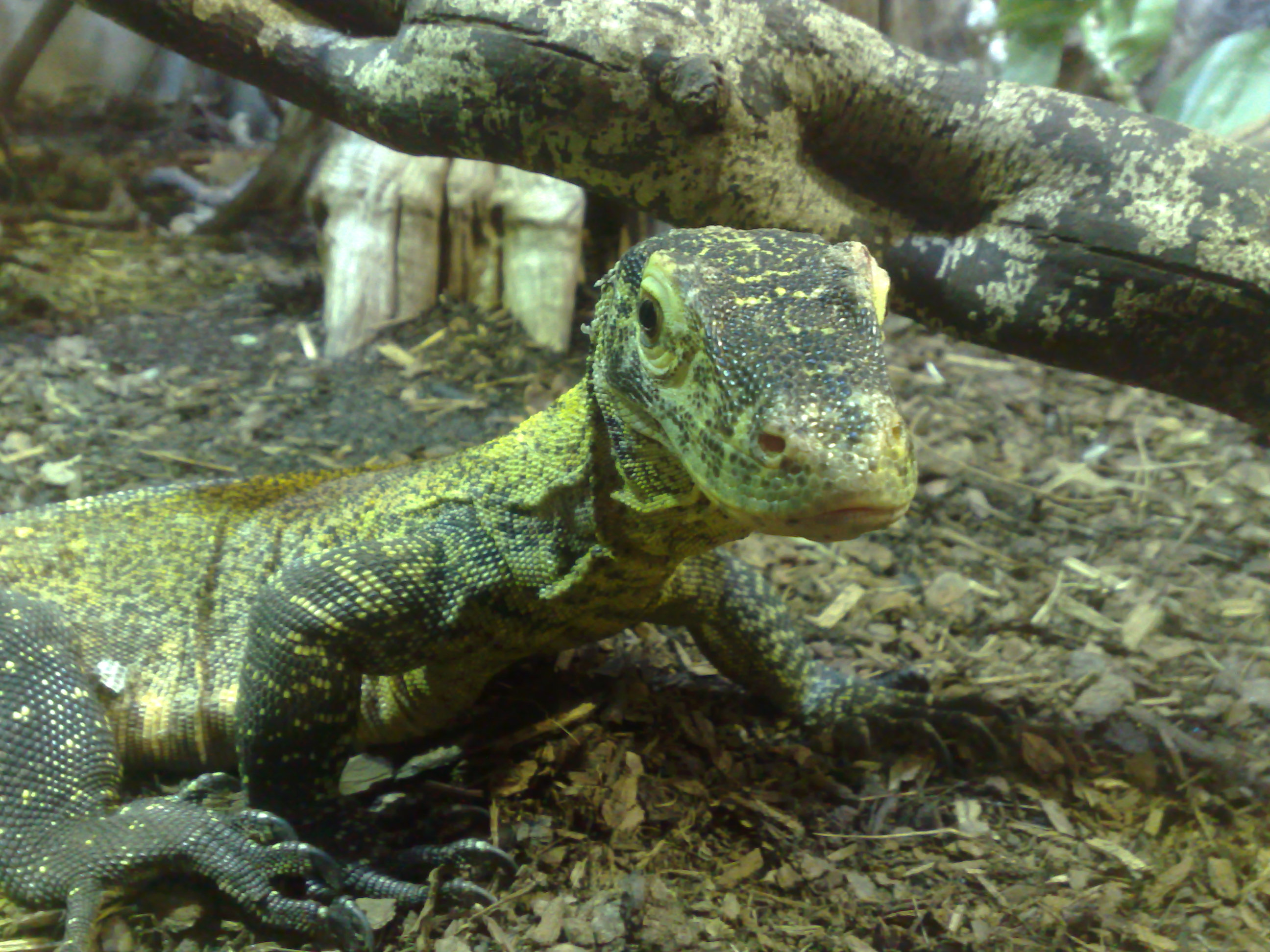
A young Komodo dragon, Varanus komodoensis, produced through parthenogenesis. Komodo dragons can produce offspring through both sexual reproduction and parthenogenesis.

Some species reproduce exclusively by parthenogenesis (such as the bdelloid rotifers), while others can switch between sexual reproduction and parthenogenesis. This is called facultative parthenogenesis (other terms are cyclical parthenogenesis, heterogamy and heterogony). Some species can reproduce both sexually and through parthenogenesis: offspring in the same clutch of a species of tropical lizard can be a mix of sexually produced offspring and parthenogenically produced offspring. In California condors, parthenogenesis is facultative, and can occur even when a male is present and available for a female to breed with. In times of stress, offspring produced by sexual reproduction may be fitter as they have new, possibly beneficial gene combinations. In addition, sexual reproduction provides the benefit of meiotic recombination between non-sister chromosomes, a process associated with repair of DNA double-strand breaks and other DNA damages that may be induced by stressful conditions.

Many taxa with heterogony have within them species that have lost the sexual phase and are now completely asexual. Many other cases of obligate parthenogenesis (or gynogenesis) are found among polyploids and hybrids where the chromosomes cannot pair for meiosis.

In animals, the production of female offspring by parthenogenesis is called thelytoky (found among aphids) while the production of males by parthenogenesis is called arrhenotoky (found among bees). When unfertilized eggs develop into both males and females, the phenomenon is called deuterotoky.

== Mechanisms ==
Parthenogenesis can occur without meiosis. This occurs when mature egg cells are produced by ordinary cell division (mitosis); these cells directly develop into embryos in a process called apomixis. In plants, this can happen in cells of the gametophyte, which is haploid. Parthenogenesis occurs in some 10% of fern species and around 1% of flowering plants. The offspring produced by apomixis are full clones of their mother, as in aphids.

Parthenogenesis involving meiosis, the reduction division that normally produces haploid eggs and sperms from diploid cells, is more complicated. In some cases, the offspring are haploid (e.g., male honey bees). In other species, where haploid individuals are unable to breed, the cells are restored to diploidy by various means in a process called automixis. Offspring produced by automixis differ from one another and from their mother, as they are randomised half clones of their mother.

=== Automixis ===
In automixis, recombination means that the offspring are not necessarily identical to the parent: both central fusion and terminal fusion affect heterozygosity.

Automixis covers several ways that offspring can be produced neither fully sexually nor by cloning; some of these are parthenogenetic. Meiosis begins normally with a halving of the number of chromosomes to create haploid cells. Diploidy is however then restored by the doubling of the chromosomes without cell division, either before meiosis begins or after meiosis is completed. This is called an endomitotic cycle. Diploidy can be restored by fusion of the first two blastomeres, or by fusion of the meiotic products. The chromosomes may not separate at one of the two anaphases (restitutional meiosis) or the nuclei produced may fuse, or one of the polar bodies may fuse with the egg cell at some stage during its maturation.

Some authors consider all forms of automixis sexual, since genetic recombination is involved. Others classify the endomitotic variants as asexual, and consider the resulting embryos parthenogenetic, but vary in the threshold for classifying automixis as a sexual process according to when the products of anaphase I or of anaphase II are joined. The criterion for sexuality ranges from restitutional meiosis, to those where the nuclei fuse, or to only those where gametes are mature at the time of fusion.

The genetic composition of the offspring depends on what type of automixis takes place. When endomitosis occurs before meiosis, or when central fusion occurs (restitutional meiosis of anaphase I or the fusion of its products), the offspring get all to more than half of the mother's genetic material and heterozygosity is mostly preserved; if the mother has two alleles for a locus, the offspring will likely get both. This is because in anaphase I the homologous chromosomes are separated. Heterozygosity is not completely preserved when crossing over occurs in central fusion. In the case of pre-meiotic doubling, recombination, if it happens, occurs between identical sister chromatids (half chromosomes).

If terminal fusion (restitutional meiosis of anaphase II or the fusion of its products) occurs, a little over half of the mother's genetic material is present in the offspring, and the offspring are mostly homozygous.

=== Sex of the offspring ===
Parthenogenesis in XY, XO, and ZW sex-determination systems

In plants, apomixis is asexual development of seeds or embryos without fertilisation. In animals, offspring produced by apomixis are clones of the mother and hence are usually female. In the case of XO animals such as aphids, parthenogenetically produced males and females are clones of their mother except that the males lack one of the X chromosomes (XO).

When meiosis is involved, the sex of the offspring depends on the type of sex determination system and the type of apomixis. In species that use the XY sex-determination system, parthenogenetic offspring have two X chromosomes and are female. In species that use the ZW sex-determination system the offspring genotype may be one of ZW (female), ZZ (male), or WW (non-viable). In the ZW system, the offspring are produced by a variety of forms of endoreduplication (genome copying without mitotic cell division) within the egg cell, or by fusion of nuclei during meiosis.

In polyploid obligate parthenogens, like the whiptail lizard, all the offspring are female.

In the Hymenoptera, the sex-determination system involves haploid males created by parthenogenesis, and diploid females by sexual reproduction. System for honey bee shown.

Many hymenopteran insects, such as honey bees, are haplodiploid. This means that female eggs are produced sexually, using sperm from a drone father, while the production of further drones (males) depends on the queen (and occasionally workers) producing unfertilized eggs. This means that females (workers and queens) are always diploid, while males (drones) are always haploid, produced parthenogenetically.

=== Facultative ===
Facultative parthenogenesis occurs when a female can produce offspring either sexually or via asexual reproduction. Facultative parthenogenesis is extremely rare in nature; it is widespread in mayflies and may be the default reproductive mode of all mayfly species. It has been believed to be a response to a lack of a viable male. However, California condors and the tropical lizard Lepidophyma smithii can produce parthenogenic offspring in the presence of males, indicating that facultative parthenogenesis may occur more widely.

In aphids, a generation sexually conceived by a male and a female produces only females. This is because of non-random segregation of the sex chromosomes 'X' and 'O' during spermatogenesis.

The term facultative parthenogenesis is sometimes used to describe cases of spontaneous parthenogenesis in animals that usually reproduce sexually. Cases in sharks, snakes, Komodo dragons, and some domesticated birds have been described. The occurrence of such asexually produced eggs in sexual animals can be explained by a meiotic error, leading to eggs produced via automixis.

=== Obligate ===
Obligate parthenogenesis is the process in which organisms exclusively reproduce through asexual means. Many species have transitioned to obligate parthenogenesis over evolutionary time. Well-documented transitions to obligate parthenogenesis have been found in numerous metazoan taxa, albeit through highly diverse mechanisms. These transitions often occur as a result of inbreeding or mutation within large populations. Some salamanders and geckos reproduce entirely by parthenogenesis, as do more than 80 female-only species of reptiles (mostly lizards but including a snake species, Indotyphlops braminus), amphibians, and fishes. Such females produce an unfertilised diploid ovum, its two sets of genes provided solely by the mother. Thus, a male is not needed to provide sperm to fertilize the egg. This form of asexual reproduction could be a serious threat to biodiversity due to the subsequent lack of gene variation and potentially decreased fitness of the offspring.

Some invertebrate species that feature (partial) sexual reproduction in their native range reproduce solely by parthenogenesis in areas to which they have been introduced. Relying solely on parthenogenetic reproduction has several advantages for an invasive species: it obviates the need for individuals in a very sparse initial population to search for mates; and an exclusively female sex distribution allows a population to multiply and invade more rapidly (potentially twice as fast). Examples include several aphid species and the willow sawfly, Nematus oligospilus, which is sexual in its native Holarctic habitat but parthenogenetic where it has been introduced into the Southern Hemisphere.

== Evolution ==
=== Taxonomic distribution ===
Taxa that use parthenogenesis include those shown on the phylogenetic tree.

- Eukaryota
  - Diphoda
    - Oomycetes
    - Plants
      - Mosses
      - - Ferns
        - Flowering plants
  - Animals
    - - Protostomia
        - Ecdysozoa
          - Onychophora
          - - Crustaceans
            - - Spiders
              - Insects
        - Spiralia
          - Rotifers
          - - Snails
            - Flatworms
      - Vertebrates
        - Chondrichthyes (sharks, rays)
        - - Teleost fishes
          - Tetrapods
            - Amphibians (frogs, salamanders: hybrids only)
            - - [Mammals (induced only)]
              - - Squamata (snakes, lizards)
                - - Crocodiles
                  - Birds

Parthenogenesis does not apply to isogamous species such as protists.

=== Evolutionary mechanisms ===
It has been asserted that "obligate parthenogenesis is an evolutionary dead end." However, as in sexually-reproducing species, a species reproducing only parthenogenetically reaches an equilibrium state of genetic variability when the rate of creation of variants (alleles) by mutation equals the rate of destruction by natural selection. Michael Lynch and Wilfried Gabriel demonstrated in 1983 that such a balance can be attained in "a few hundred generations". They suggested that evolution might proceed as fast in such parthenogens as in species that always reproduce sexually. They noted that sexual reproduction can sometimes occur in parthenogenetic species, including via backcrossing with a sexually-reproducing parent species.

A 2017 survey of 765 instances of parthenogenesis among haplodiploid arthropods found that the frequency of parthenogenesis varied widely between genera, from 0% to 38%; and that species often contained some parthenogenetic and some sexual lineages. Further, species of parasitoids and plant-eaters that were parthenogenetic had more host species (insects and plants respectively) and wider geographic distributions that reached further towards the poles than did related sexual species. The survey authors, Casper van der Kooi and colleagues, suggest that since these findings imply large population sizes, it may be that parthenogenesis arises more often in large populations of sexual species, or that parthenogens with large populations go extinct less often. They comment that parthenogenesis has evolved much more often than had been believed.

== Similar phenomena ==
=== Androgenesis ===
Androgenesis is a system of asexual reproduction and occurs when a zygote is produced with only paternal nuclear genes. Requiring the presence of eggs, one of two things can occur to produce offspring with exclusively paternal genetic material: The maternal nuclear genome can be eliminated from the zygote, or the female can produce an egg with no nucleus, resulting in an embryo developing with only the genome of the male gamete. Although androgenesis requires both male and females gametes, it is not strictly considered a form of sexual reproduction, because the offspring have uniparental nuclear DNA that has not undergone recombination. Androgenesis can lead to exclusively asexually reproducing species.

=== Gynogenesis ===
A form of asexual reproduction related to parthenogenesis is gynogenesis. Here, offspring are produced by the same mechanism as in parthenogenesis, but with the requirement that the egg merely be stimulated by the presence of sperm to develop. However, the sperm cell does not contribute any genetic material to the offspring. Since gynogenetic species are all female, activation of their eggs requires mating with males of a closely related species for the needed stimulus. Some salamanders of the genus Ambystoma are gynogenetic and appear to have been so for over a million years. The success of those salamanders may be due to rare fertilization of eggs by males, introducing new material to the gene pool, which may result from perhaps only one mating out of a million. In addition, the Amazon molly is known to reproduce by gynogenesis.

=== Hybridogenesis ===
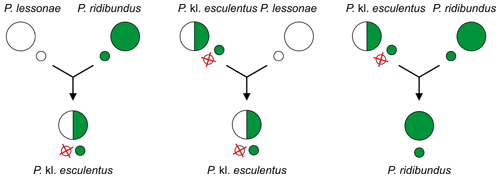
Example crosses between pool frog (Pelophylax lessonae), marsh frog (P. ridibundus) and their hybrid – edible frog (P. kl. esculentus). On the left, primary hybridisation generating a hybrid, while the middle is the most widespread type of hybridogenesis. Large circles - adult frogs, small circles - gametes, × - lack of gametes containing genome of one of the parental species.

Hybridogenesis is a mode of reproduction of hybrids. Hybridogenetic hybrids (for example AB genome), usually females, during gametogenesis exclude one of parental genomes (A) and produce gametes with unrecombined genome of second parental species (B), instead of containing mixed recombined parental genomes. First genome (A) is restored by fertilization of these gametes with gametes from the first species (AA, sexual host, usually male). Hybridogenesis is hemiclonal rather than completely asexual: half the genome is passed to the next generation clonally, unrecombined, intact (B), and the other half sexually, recombined (A). This process continues, so that each generation is half (or hemi-) clonal on the mother's side and has half new genetic material from the father's side.

This form of reproduction is seen in some live-bearing fish of the genus Poeciliopsis and in several Pelophylax waterfrogs.

Hybridogenesis is at least one of the modes of reproduction in the Iberian minnow Tropidophoxinellus alburnoides, spined loaches Cobitis, and Bacillus stick insects.

== Artificial induction ==
=== In plants ===
Apomixis can be induced in flowering plants, for instance as investigated in Arabidopsis and Taraxacum. Some of the genes involved have been identified in plants including cereal species such as pearl millet, rice, and maize. This in principle enables the use of apomixis in plant breeding, such as to produce cloned crop seeds.

=== In mammals ===
An electrical or chemical stimulus can trigger parthenogenesis in the asexual development of viable offspring from mammalian mothers.

Induction of parthenogenesis in pigs

During oocyte development, high metaphase-promoting factor (MPF) activity causes mammalian oocytes to arrest at the metaphase II stage until they are fertilized. Fertilization causes intracellular calcium oscillations and targeted degradation of cyclin B, a regulatory subunit of MPF; this permits the oocyte to proceed through meiosis.

Unfertilised development of pig oocytes is induced by artificial activation that mimics sperm entry, such as calcium ionophore treatment, microinjection of calcium ions, or electrical stimulation. Treatment with cycloheximide, a non-specific protein synthesis inhibitor, enhances the development of unfertilised eggs in pigs, presumably by continual inhibition of MPF/cyclin B. As meiosis proceeds, extrusion of the second polar is blocked by exposure to cytochalasin B. This treatment results in a diploid parthenote. The resulting embryos can be surgically transferred to a recipient oviduct for further development, but they succumb to developmental failure after around 30 days of gestation. The swine placenta in these cases often appears hypo-vascular.

Induced parthenogenesis of this type in mice and monkeys results in abnormal development. This is because mammals have imprinted genetic regions, where either the maternal or the paternal chromosome is inactivated in the offspring for development to proceed normally. A mammal developing from parthenogenesis would have double doses of maternally imprinted genes and would lack paternally imprinted genes, leading to developmental abnormalities. Defects in placental folding or interdigitation may be a cause of abortive development of pig parthenotes.

In 2022, viable offspring from unfertilized mouse eggs were created, addressing the problems of genomic imprinting by "targeted DNA methylation rewriting of seven imprinting control regions".

== Human aspects ==
=== History of discovery ===
The Genevan naturalist Charles Bonnet (1720–1793) showed by experiment that aphids were able to reproduce by parthenogenesis.

The Polish apiarist Jan Dzierżon (1811–1906) discovered that male honey bees were produced from unfertilised eggs.

The German-born American physiologist Jacques Loeb (1859–1924) showed by experiment that the eggs of sea urchins could begin embryonic development in the absence of sperm.

=== In culture ===
Parthenogenesis in Greek mythology: the earth goddess Gaia gave rise to the sky god Ouranos on her own, and then had sex with him to produce the Titans and the Cyclopes.

Parthenogenesis, in the form of reproduction from a mother alone, is common in mythology, religion, and folklore around the world. In ancient Greek myth, the goddess Gaia (the earth) gives birth to the god Ouranos (the heavens), and according to Hesiod and others, the god Hephaestus is born from Hera. In Christianity and Islam, Jesus has a virgin birth; stories of miraculous births appear in other global religions. The theme is one of several aspects of reproductive biology explored in science fiction.

=== Towards human parthenogenesis ===
In 1955, the geneticist Helen Spurway claimed that parthenogenesis might rarely occur in humans, leading to so-called "virgin births". Sometimes an unfertilised embryo begins to develop; while it may create some skin and nerve cells, it cannot create others (such as skeletal muscle) and becomes an ovarian teratoma.

In 1995, a boy was found to have some of his white blood cells lacking any genetic content from his father. An unfertilized egg began to self-divide but then, early in development, had some of its cells fertilized by a sperm cell. The unfertilized cells eventually duplicated their DNA, boosting their chromosomes to 46. When the unfertilized cells hit a developmental block, the fertilized cells took over and developed that tissue. The boy had asymmetrical facial features and learning difficulties, but was otherwise healthy. This would make him a parthenogenetic chimera (a child with two cell lineages in his body). While over a dozen similar cases have since been reported, there have been no confirmed reports of a non-chimeric, clinically healthy human parthenote, i.e., produced from a single, parthenogenetic-activated oocyte.

In 2007, the International Stem Cell Corporation of California announced that Elena Revazova had intentionally created human stem cells from unfertilized human eggs. The process may offer a way to create stem cells genetically matched to a particular female to treat degenerative diseases. The same year, Revazova and ISCC described how to produce human stem cells homozygous in the HLA region of DNA. These stem cells would enable the creation of implants safe from immune rejection. By selecting oocyte donors according to HLA haplotype, it would be possible to generate a bank of cell lines whose tissue derivatives, collectively, could be MHC-matched within the human population.

An independent investigation found that the discredited South Korean scientist Hwang Woo-suk had unknowingly produced the first human embryos by parthenogenesis. Hwang had claimed, falsely, that his team had extracted stem cells from cloned human embryos. The chromosomes of these cells showed indications of parthenogenesis in extracted stem cells, similar to those of the mice created by Tokyo scientists in 2004.

== See also ==
- Telescoping generations – Reproduction without ovum fertilization
- Parthenocarpy – Production of seedless fruit without fertilisation
