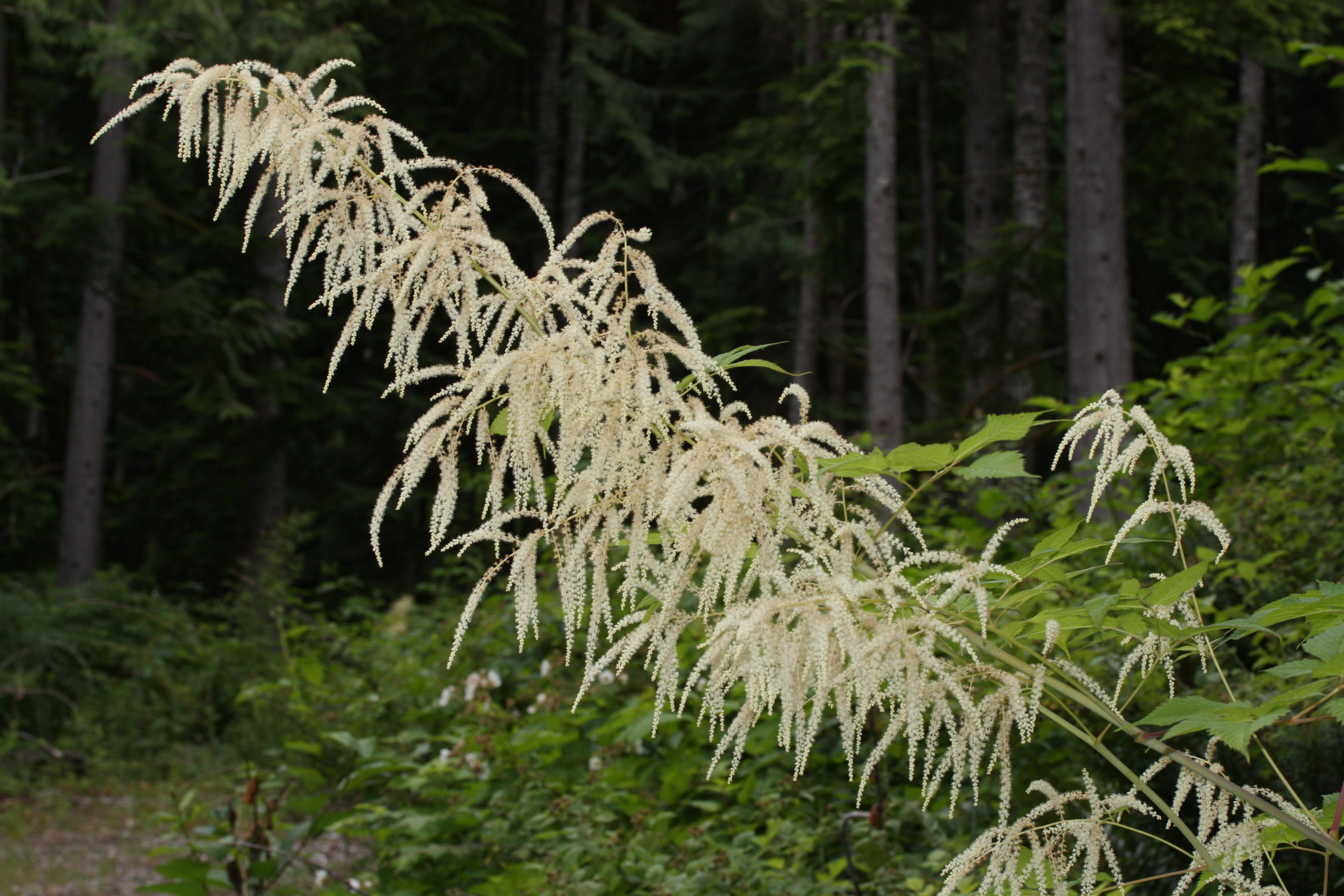
- Inflorescence

Scientific classification
- Kingdom: Plantae
- Clade: Tracheophytes
- Clade: Angiosperms
- Clade: Eudicots
- Clade: Rosids
- Order: Rosales
- Family: Rosaceae
- Genus: Aruncus
- Species: A. dioicus

Binomial name
- Aruncus dioicus (Walter) Fernald

= Aruncus dioicus =

Species of flowering plant

Aruncus dioicus, known as goat's beard, buck's-beard or bride's feathers, is a flowering herbaceous perennial plant in the family Rosaceae, found in Europe, Asia, and eastern and western North America. It is the type species of the genus Aruncus. It has alternate, pinnately compound leaves, on thin, stiff stems, with plumes of feathery white or cream flowers borne in summer.

The Latin specific epithet dioicus means "having the male reproductive organs on one plant, and the female on another".

== Description ==
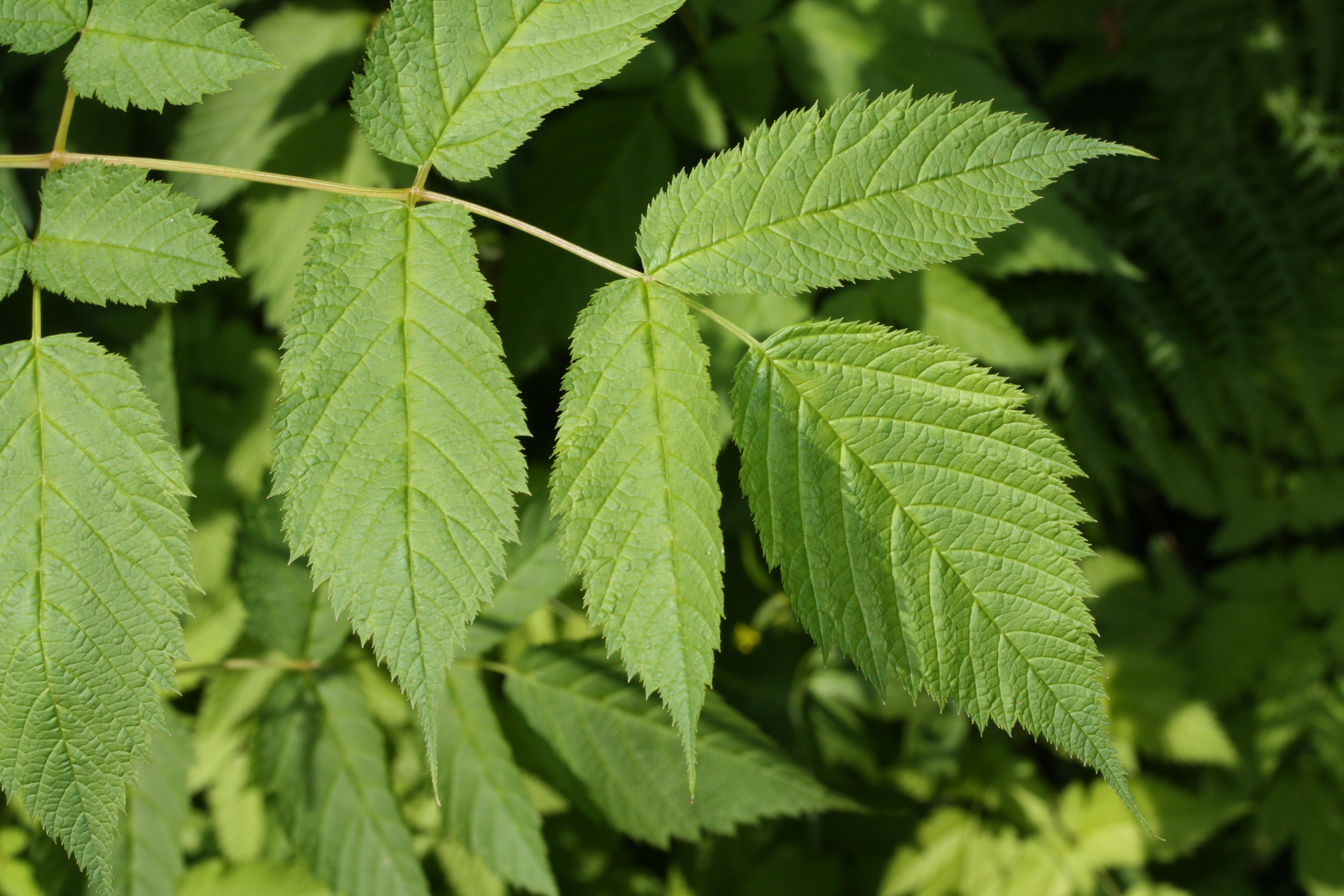
The leaves are alternate and pinnately compound. Leaflets are sharply compoundly-serrate.

The species is from 1.2 to 1.8 metres (4 to 6 ft) tall, with compound leaves consisting of 3 or 5 leaflets. Very small, 5-petaled white or cream flowers are displayed in showy panicles, blooming in late spring to early summer. Male and female flowers are borne on different plants. The flower spikes rise high above the plant, adding to the showiness of the species. Plants with male flowers have a showier bloom than the ones with female flowers.

== Varieties ==
- Aruncus dioicus var. aethusifolius (H.Lév.) H.Hara – Korean goatsbeard

== Distribution and habitat ==
This plant can be found in moist woodland, often at higher altitudes, throughout temperate areas of Europe, Asia, and eastern and western North America. In the UK it is considered suitable for planting in and around water areas, and has gained the Royal Horticultural Society's Award of Garden Merit. Goat's beard prefers humus-rich soil and shade or partial shade. It can be grown in full sun if it has consistent moisture.

== Ecology ==
Aruncus dioicus is the host plant for the dusky azure butterfly.

== Uses ==
In Italy the young shoots are eaten, usually boiled briefly in herb infused water, and then cooked with eggs and cheese. In Friuli it is one of the ingredients in the local home-made soup based on wild greens called 'pistic'.

Aruncus dioicus var. kamtschaticus has shown potent cytotoxicity against Jurkat T cells.

Native Americans in the Northwest used the plant medicinally as a diuretic, as a poultice, and to treat blood diseases, smallpox, and sore throats.
