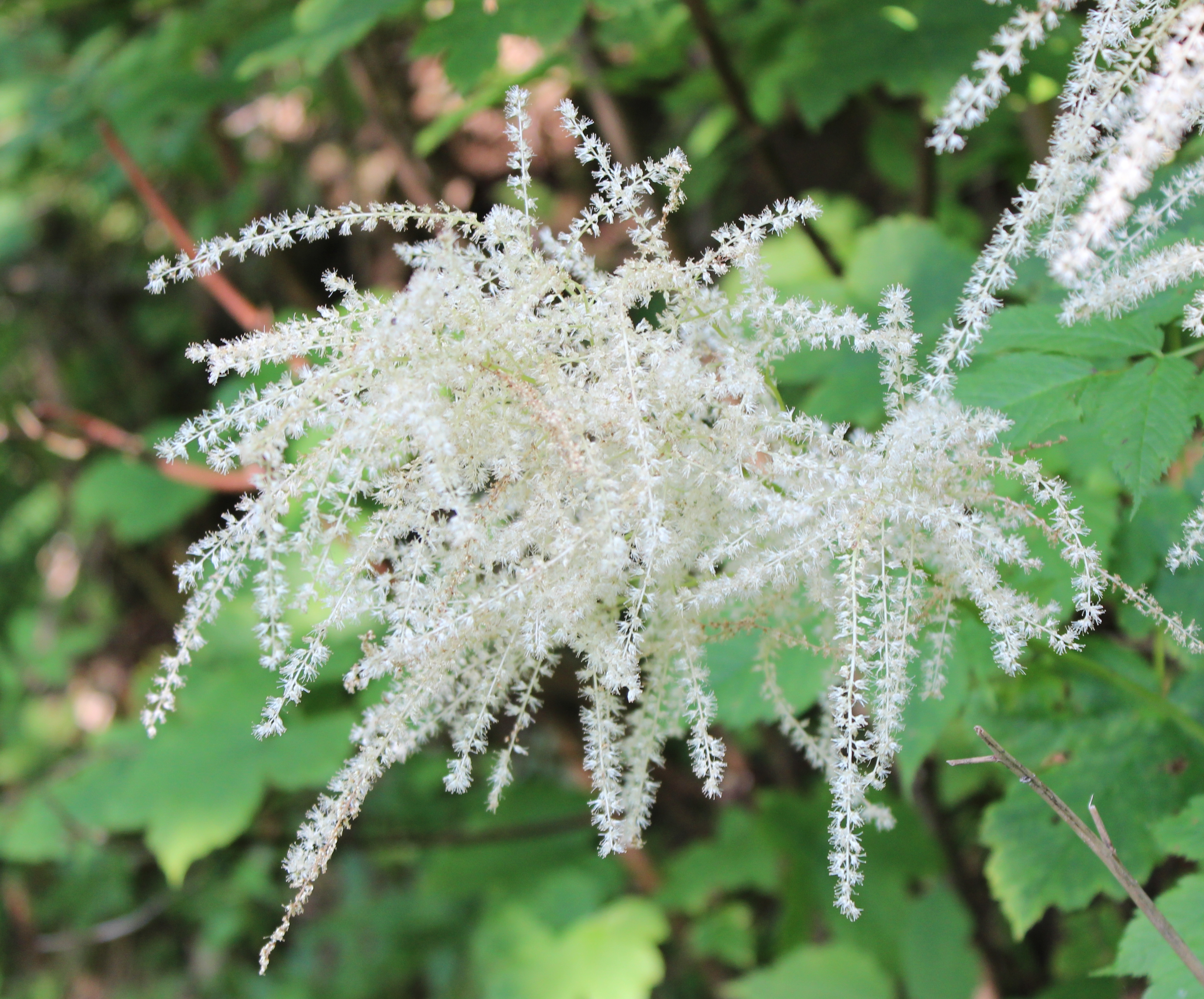
- In bloom
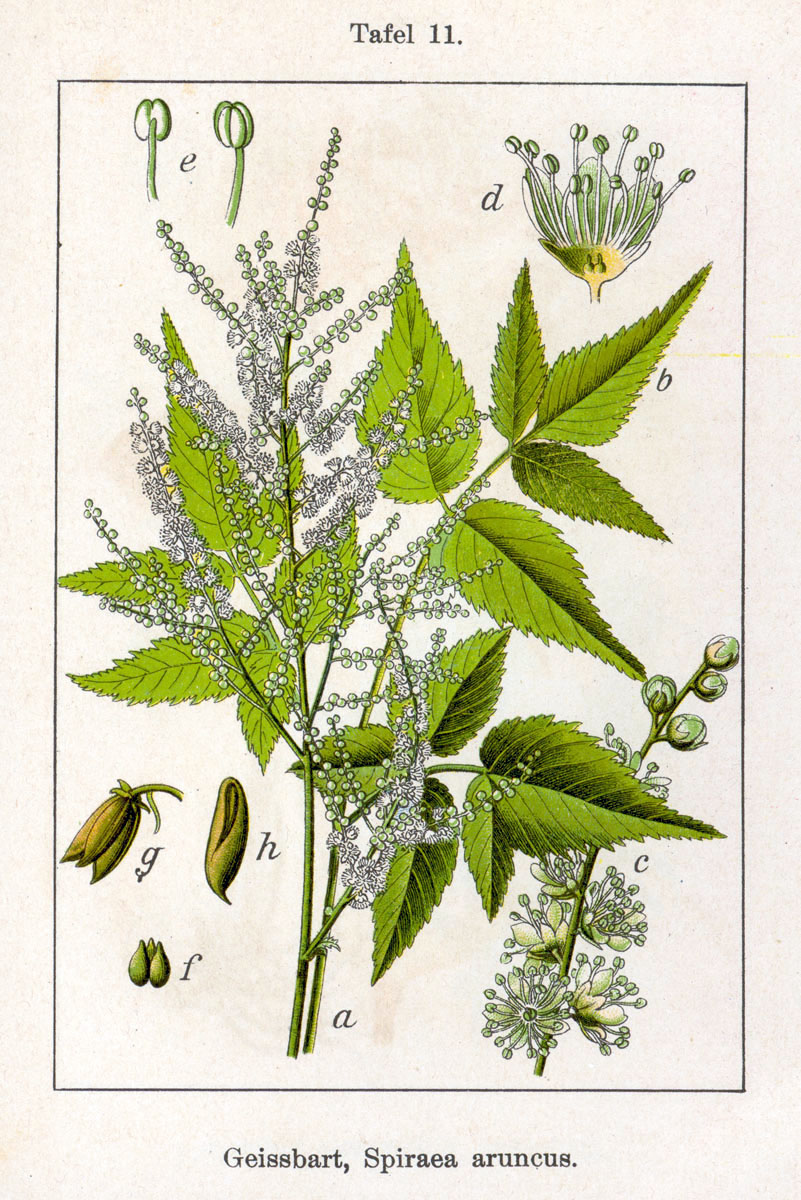
- Botanical illustration

Scientific classification
- Kingdom: Plantae
- Clade: Embryophytes
- Clade: Tracheophytes
- Clade: Spermatophytes
- Clade: Angiosperms
- Clade: Eudicots
- Clade: Rosids
- Order: Rosales
- Family: Rosaceae
- Genus: Aruncus
- Species: A. sylvester

Binomial name
- Aruncus sylvester Kostel. ex Maxim.

Synonyms
- List: Aruncus aethusifolius (H.Lév.) Nakai; Aruncus aruncus (L.) H.Karst.; Aruncus asiaticus Pojark.; Aruncus dioicus var. aethusifolius (H.Lév.) H.Hara; Aruncus dioicus var. asiaticus (Pojark.) Kitag.; Aruncus dioicus f. laciniatus (H.Hara) H.Ikeda; Aruncus dioicus var. laciniatus (H.Hara) H.Hara; Aruncus dioicus var. tenuifolius (Nakai ex H.Hara) H.Hara; Aruncus dioicus f. tomentosus (Koidz.) H.Hara; Aruncus dioicus subsp. vulgaris (Maxim.) Tzvelev; Aruncus dioicus var. vulgaris (Maxim.) H.Hara; Aruncus kyusianus Koidz.; Aruncus laciniatus H.Hara; Aruncus sylvester f. incisus Liou & C.Y.Li; Aruncus sylvester var. tenuifolius Nakai ex H.Hara; Aruncus sylvester var. tomentosus Koidz.; Aruncus sylvester var. vulgaris Maxim.; Aruncus sylvestris Kostel.; Aruncus tomentosus (Koidz.) Koidz.; Aruncus vulgaris (Maxim.) Raf. ex H.Hara; Aruncus vulgaris var. laciniatus H.Hara; Astilbe thunbergii var. aethusifolia H.Lév.; Spiraea aruncus L.; Ulmaria aruncus (L.) Hill

= Aruncus sylvester =

Species of flowering plant

Aruncus sylvester, the goat's beard, is a species of flowering plant in the family Rosaceae, found from the Himalayas to the Russian Far East and Japan. As its synonym Aruncus aethusifolius it has gained the Royal Horticultural Society's Award of Garden Merit.

== Subtaxa ==
The following varieties are accepted:

- Aruncus sylvester var. laciniatus (H.Hara) H.Hara – northern Japan
- Aruncus sylvester var. sylvester
