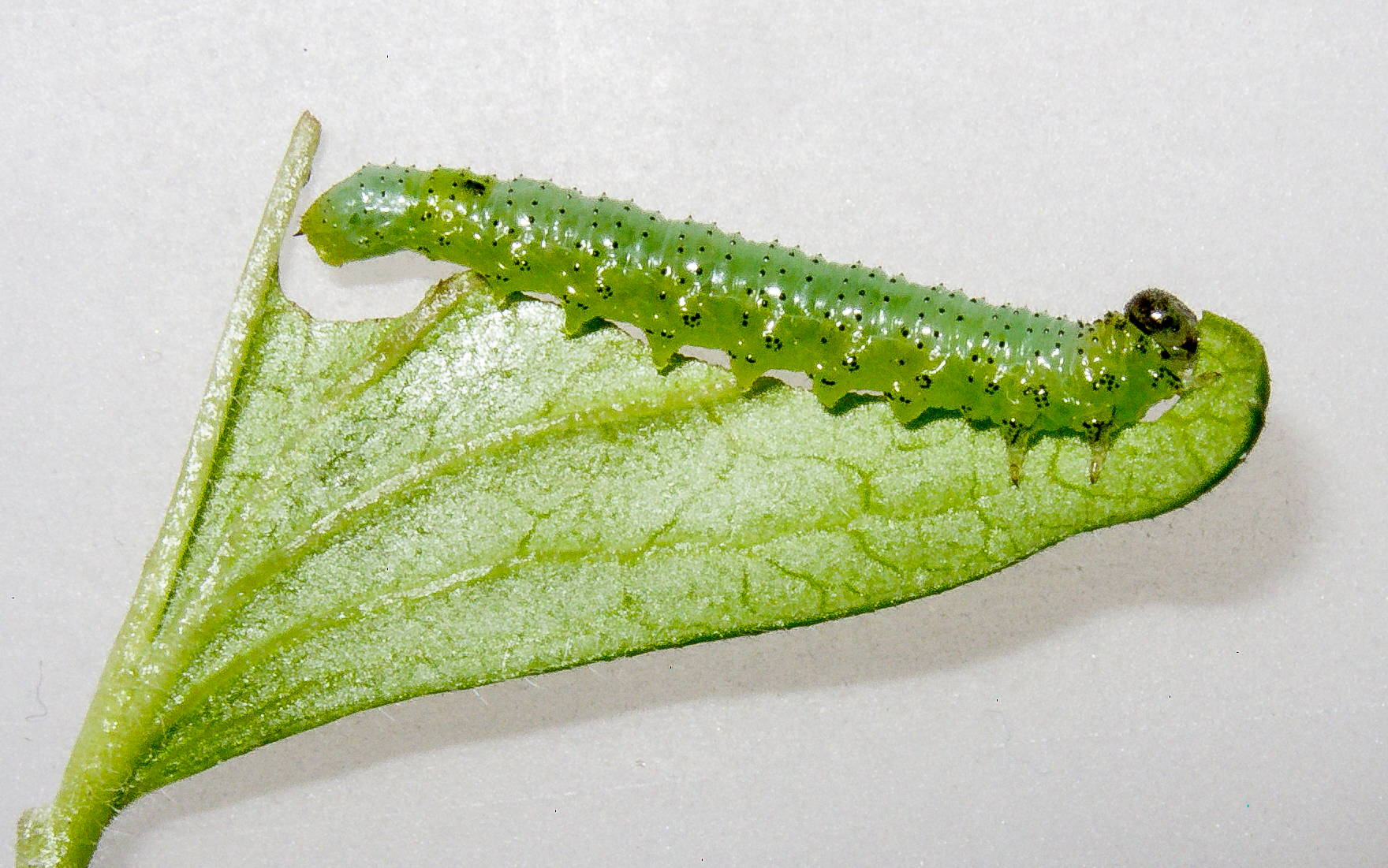
- Larva on gooseberry leaf

Scientific classification
- Domain: Eukaryota
- Kingdom: Animalia
- Phylum: Arthropoda
- Class: Insecta
- Order: Hymenoptera
- Suborder: Symphyta
- Family: Tenthredinidae
- Subfamily: Nematinae
- Genus: Nematus
- Species: N. leucotrochus

Binomial name
- Nematus leucotrochus Hartig, 1837

= Nematus leucotrochus =

Pale-spotted gooseberry sawfly

Species of sawfly

Nematus leucotrochus is a species of sawfly in the family Tenthredinidae, known as the pale-spotted gooseberry sawfly. Widespread throughout central and northern Europe, this insect is best known as a pest of gooseberries. The larvae feed on the foliage of the plant, defoliating it. Unlike Nematus ribesii, the common gooseberry sawfly, the species has a single brood. Adults appear in early May and larvae in May and June.

Control measures include hand-picking larvae in the early stages of an attack, or spraying with a recommended insecticide.
