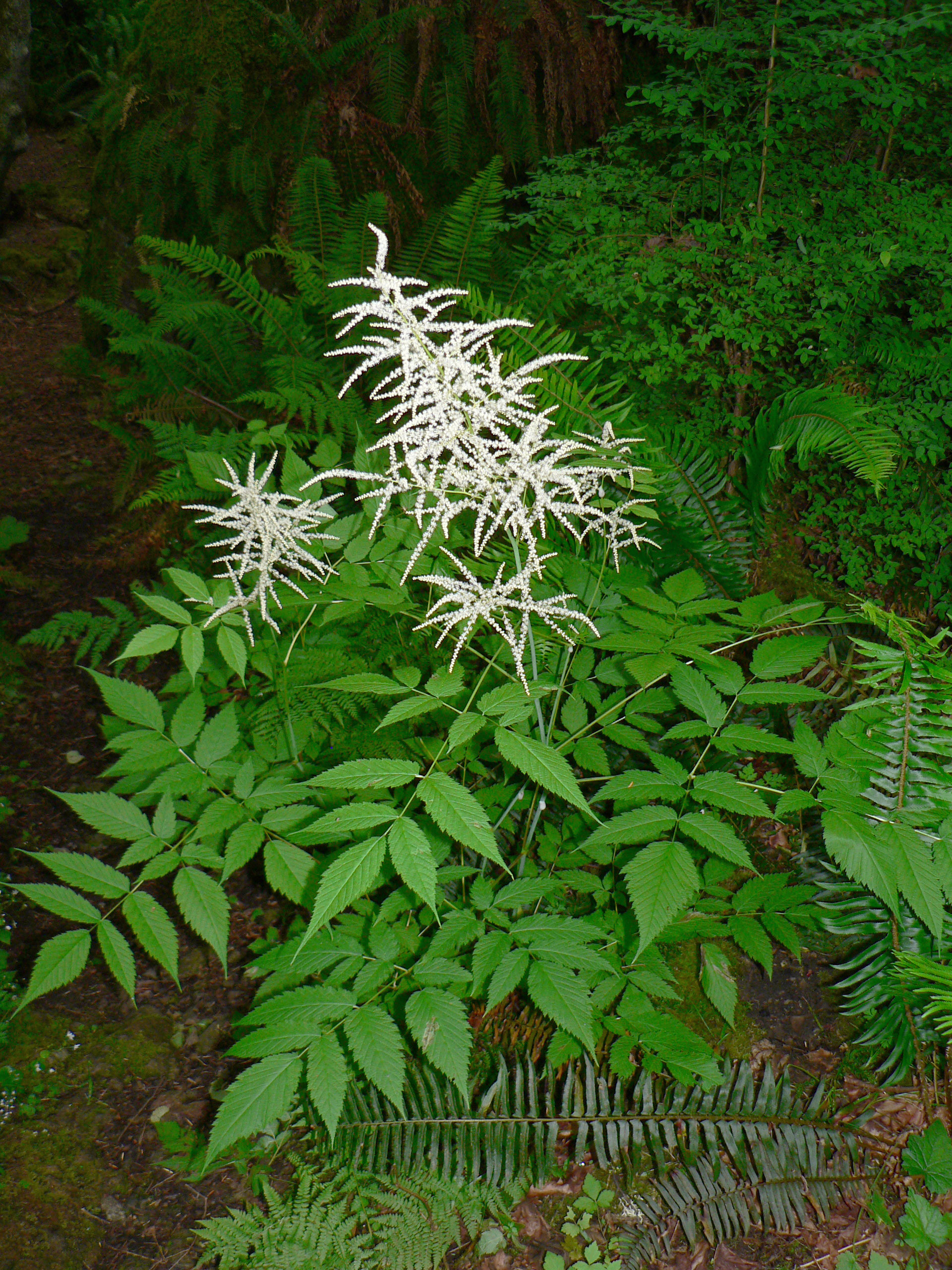
- Aruncus dioicus

Scientific classification
- Kingdom: Plantae
- Clade: Tracheophytes
- Clade: Angiosperms
- Clade: Eudicots
- Clade: Rosids
- Order: Rosales
- Family: Rosaceae
- Subfamily: Amygdaloideae
- Tribe: Spiraeeae
- Genus: Aruncus; L.

Species
- Aruncus aethusifolius; Aruncus dioicus; Aruncus gombalanus; Aruncus sylvester

= Aruncus =

Genus of flowering plants

Aruncus is a genus of clump-forming herbaceous perennial plants in the family Rosaceae. Botanical opinion of the number of species differs, with from one to four species accepted. They are closely related to the genus Spiraea. Phylogenetic studies have shown that they are less closely related to the genus Filipendula, which is now placed in another subfamily, Rosoideae, whereas the species of these three genera look alike, and in the past were considered members of the single genus Spiraea. Aruncus is native to mountainous damp woodland in temperate regions of the Northern Hemisphere. Creamy white plumes of flowers are produced above veined and toothed leaflets.

- Aruncus dioicus (goatsbeard) occurs throughout the cooler parts of Europe, Asia and North America. In the broad sense, this is the only species in the genus, with the species below treated as synonyms or varieties of it by some botanists.
- Aruncus aethusifolius (dwarf goatsbeard or Korean goatsbeard) has a restricted range, limited to Korea. This species appears in cultivation, and has gained the Royal Horticultural Society's Award of Garden Merit.
- Aruncus gombalanus (Yunnan goatsbeard) occurs in the mountains of northwest Yunnan and adjacent Tibet.
- Aruncus sylvester (Asian goatsbeard) covers the widespread Asian forms of A. dioicus.

Tragopogon is also known as "goatsbeard" but is not closely related.

== Cultivation ==
Goatsbeard does well in USDA Plant Hardiness Zones 4–9 in almost any soil, in sun, or light shade. Set plants approximately 18 – 24 inches apart. To get new plants, divide clumps in spring or fall; otherwise clumps can remain undisturbed indefinitely.

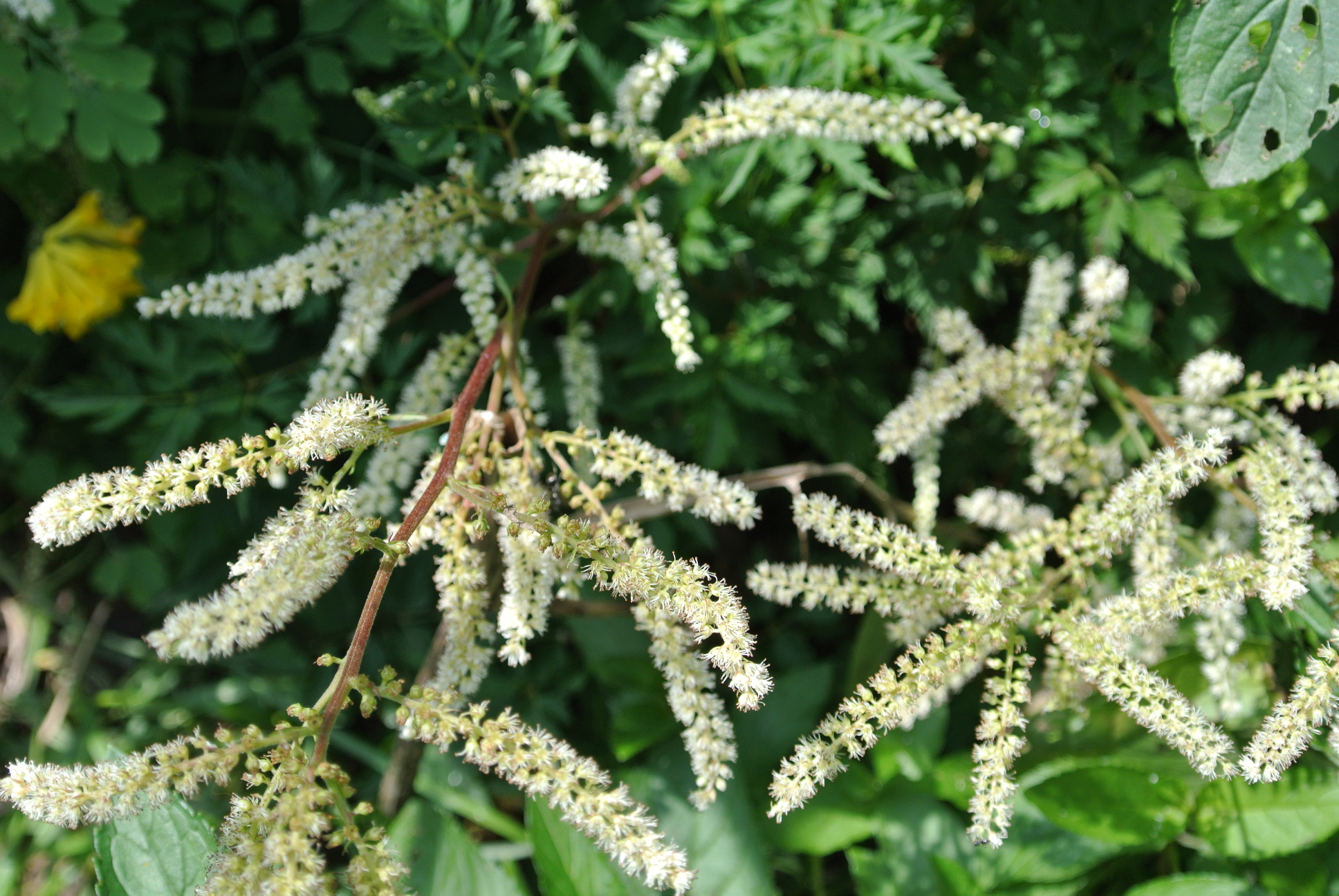
Aruncus aesthusifolius
