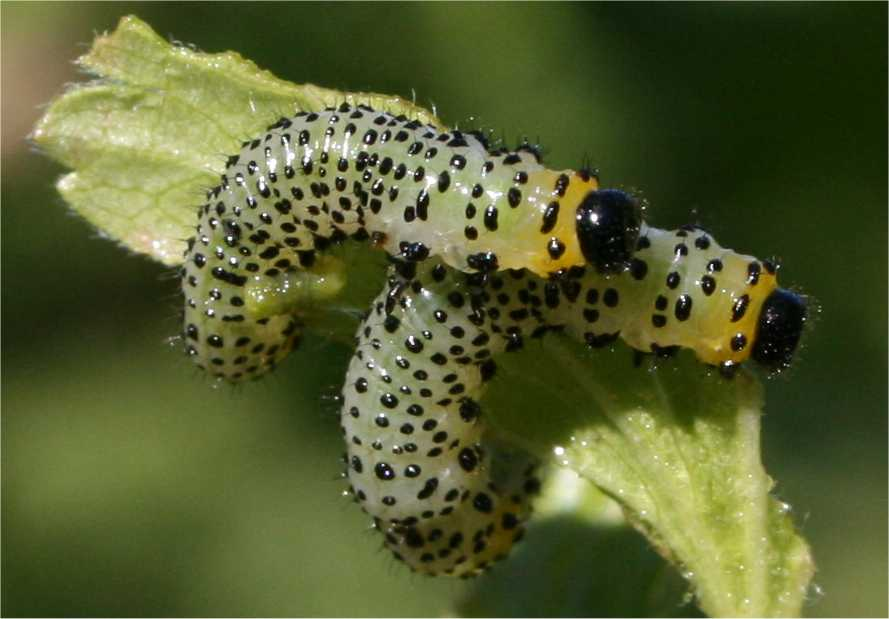
- Larvae

Scientific classification
- Domain: Eukaryota
- Kingdom: Animalia
- Phylum: Arthropoda
- Class: Insecta
- Order: Hymenoptera
- Suborder: Symphyta
- Family: Tenthredinidae
- Subfamily: Nematinae
- Genus: Nematus
- Species: N. ribesii

Binomial name
- Nematus ribesii (Scopoli, 1763)

= Nematus ribesii =

Species of sawfly

Nematus ribesii is a species of sawfly in the family Tenthredinidae. English names include common gooseberry sawfly and imported currantworm. This insect is best known as a pest of gooseberries. The larvae feed on the foliage of the plant, often defoliating it completely.

Like all sawflies, this species is a hymenopteran, not a true fly. This insect can produce three generations per year, with larvae emerging between April and September. It differs in this respect from Nematus leucotrochus, the pale-spotted gooseberry sawfly, which has a single generation. The female sawfly lays eggs on the undersides of the leaves and the larvae work their way upwards, stripping the plant of foliage. The larva of this species of sawfly is up to 2 centimeters long and green in color with a black head and black spots along the body. The adult is yellowish with black markings, the females slightly larger than the males.
