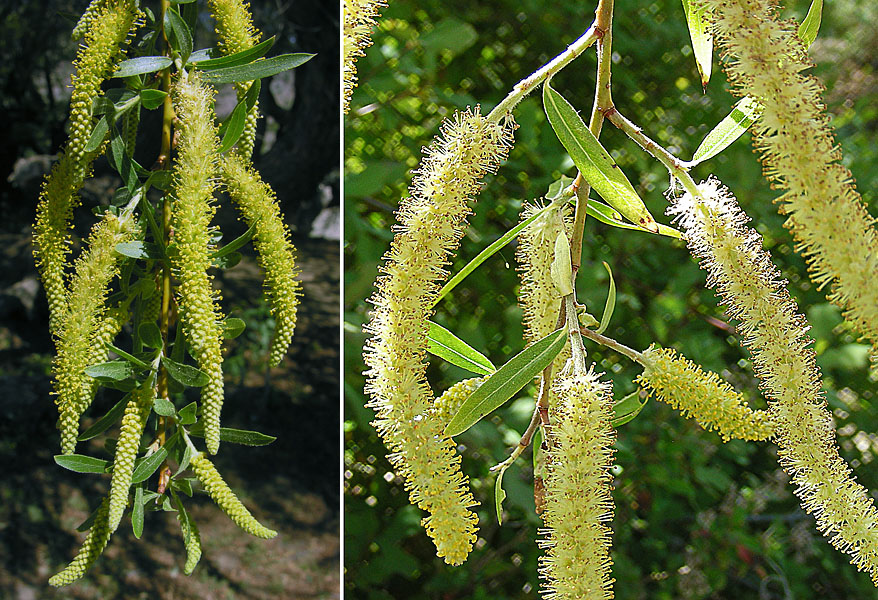

Conservation status
- Least Concern (IUCN 3.1)

Scientific classification
- Kingdom: Plantae
- Clade: Tracheophytes
- Clade: Angiosperms
- Clade: Eudicots
- Clade: Rosids
- Order: Malpighiales
- Family: Salicaceae
- Genus: Salix
- Species: S. humboldtiana

Binomial name
- Salix humboldtiana Willd.

= Salix humboldtiana =

Species of willow

Salix humboldtiana, called Humboldt's willow, is a tree species of willow native to North and South America, growing along watercourses. Some authorities consider it a synonym of Salix chilensis, which Molina described in 1782. Willdenow described Salix humboldtiana in 1805.

== Description ==
The species is evergreen or deciduous, depending on climate. It can grow up to 25 meters tall, with a narrow triangular or columnar crown shape. The trunk has a maximum d.b.h. of 80 cm and dark brown to gray fissured bark. Other characteristics are: narrow lanceolate leaves up to 15 cm long, with serrate margin and light green color, that in temperate climates, turn yellow in autumn; catkins 4–10 cm long; male flowers yellowish green, with an ovate-lanceolate bract, six stamens; and female flowers green.

== Distribution and habitat ==
The natural range of Salix humboldtiana spans from central Mexico to southern Chile and Argentina, growing in areas with tropical, subtropical and temperate climate between near sea level to 3,300 metres (10,800 ft) of elevation.
