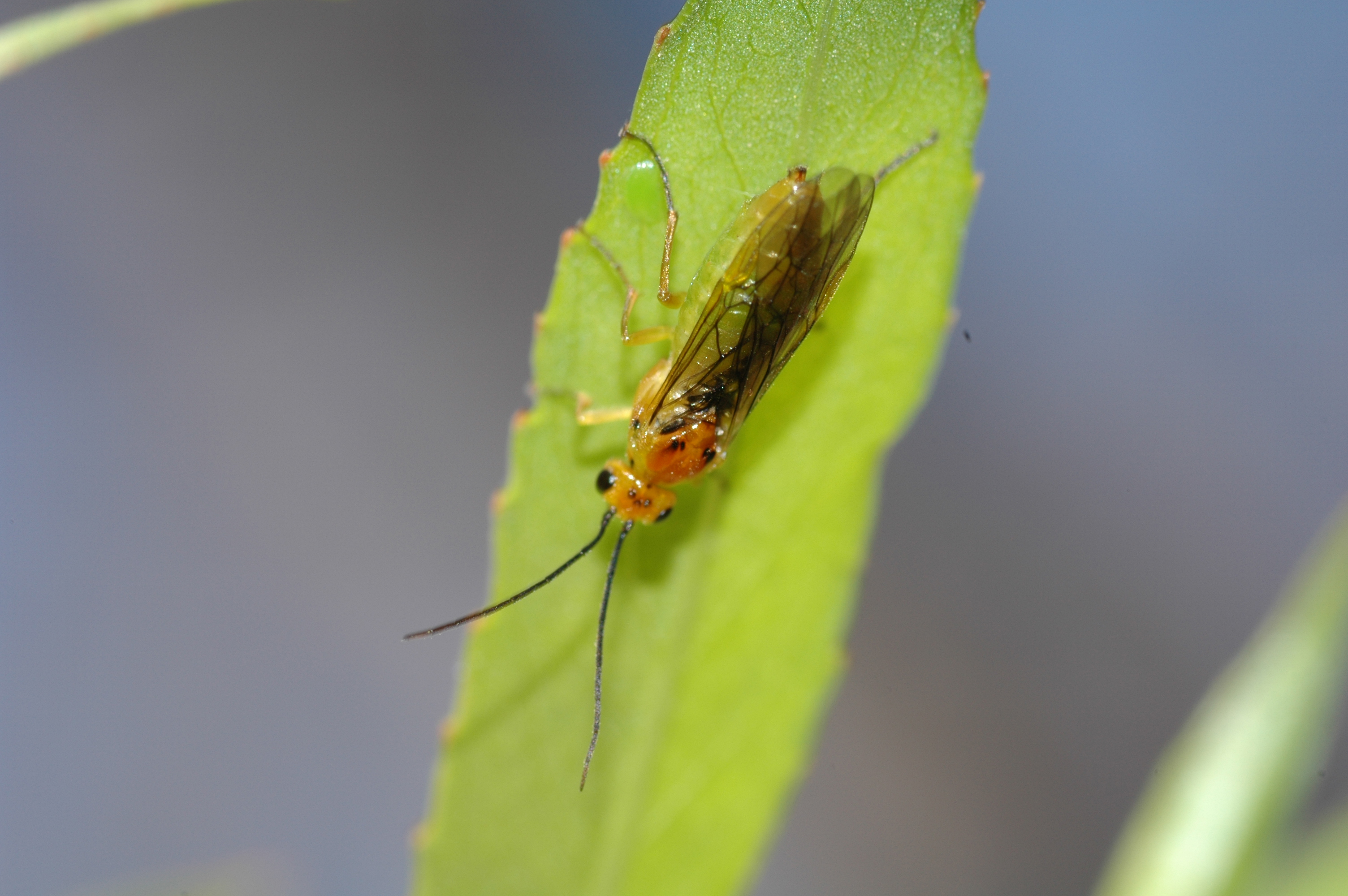
- Adult willow sawfly, Nematus oligospilus

Scientific classification
- Domain: Eukaryota
- Kingdom: Animalia
- Phylum: Arthropoda
- Class: Insecta
- Order: Hymenoptera
- Suborder: Symphyta
- Family: Tenthredinidae
- Subfamily: Nematinae
- Genus: Nematus; Panzer, 1801

= Nematus =

Genus of sawflies

Nematus is a genus of sawfly in the family Tenthredinidae. Some of its species, including Nematus leucotrochus, Nematus olfaciens and Nematus ribesii, eat the leaves of fruit bushes and trees, and can be serious pests.

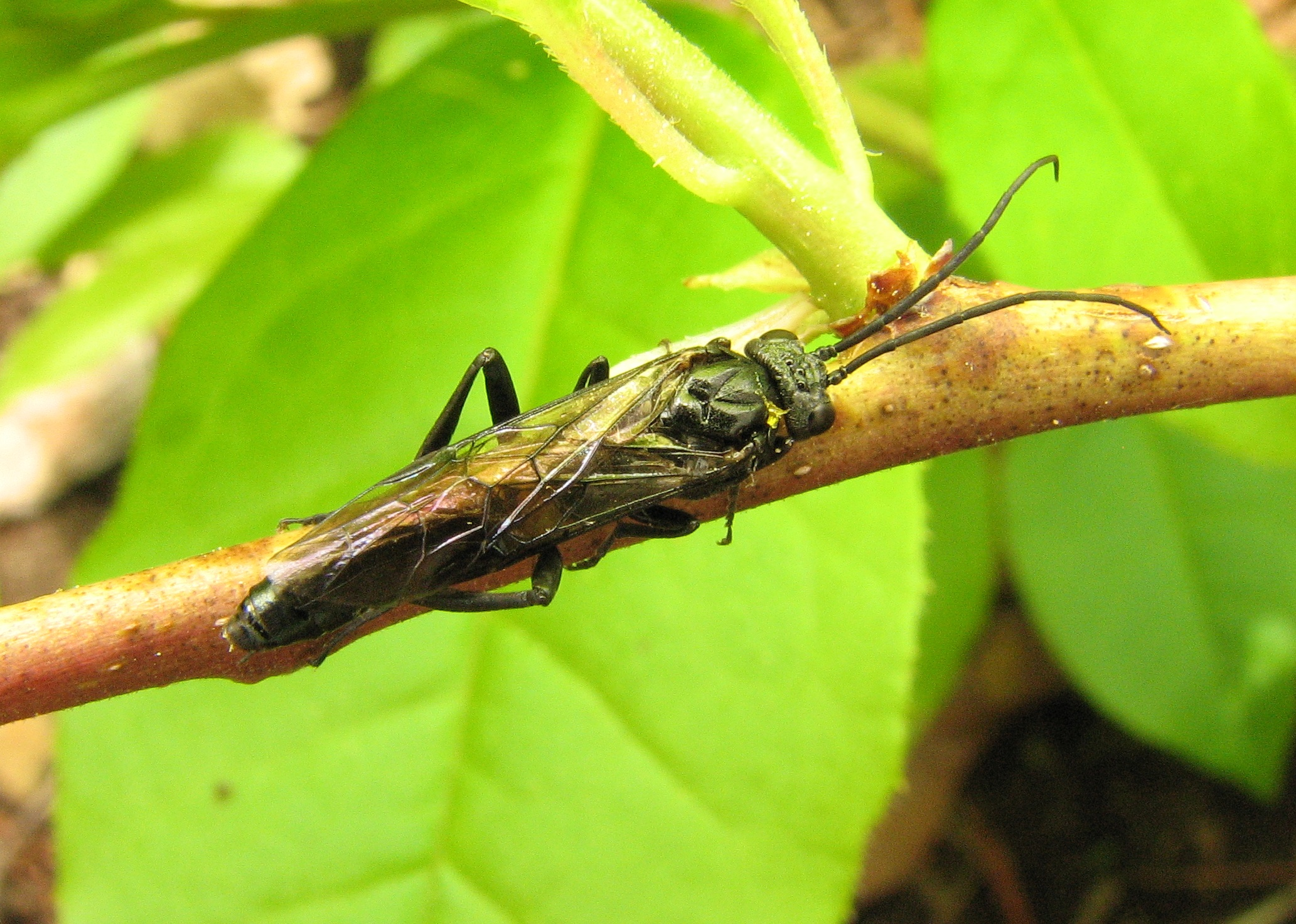
Nematus abbotii

Larvae

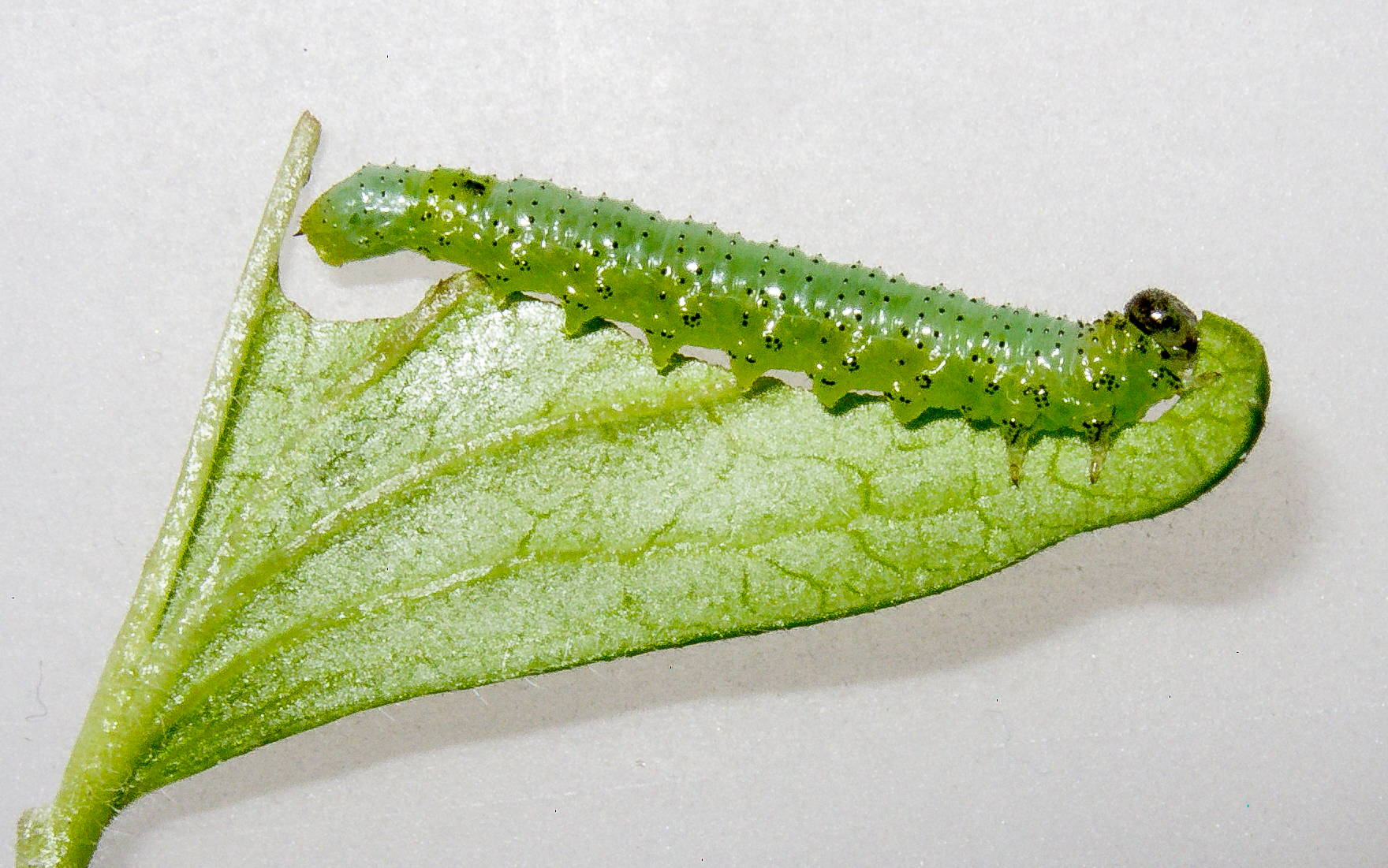
Nematus leucotrochus, pale-spotted gooseberry sawfly

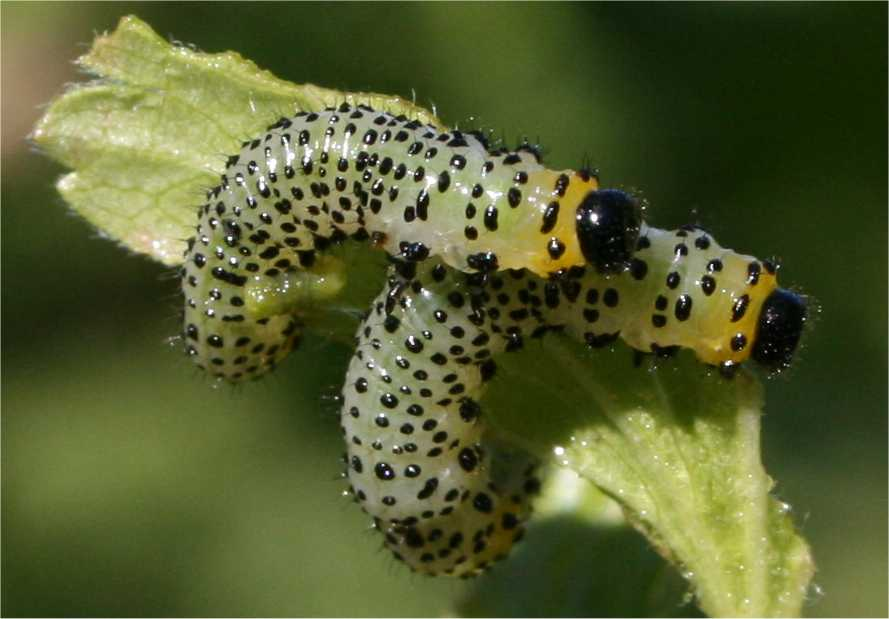
Nematus ribesii, common gooseberry sawfly

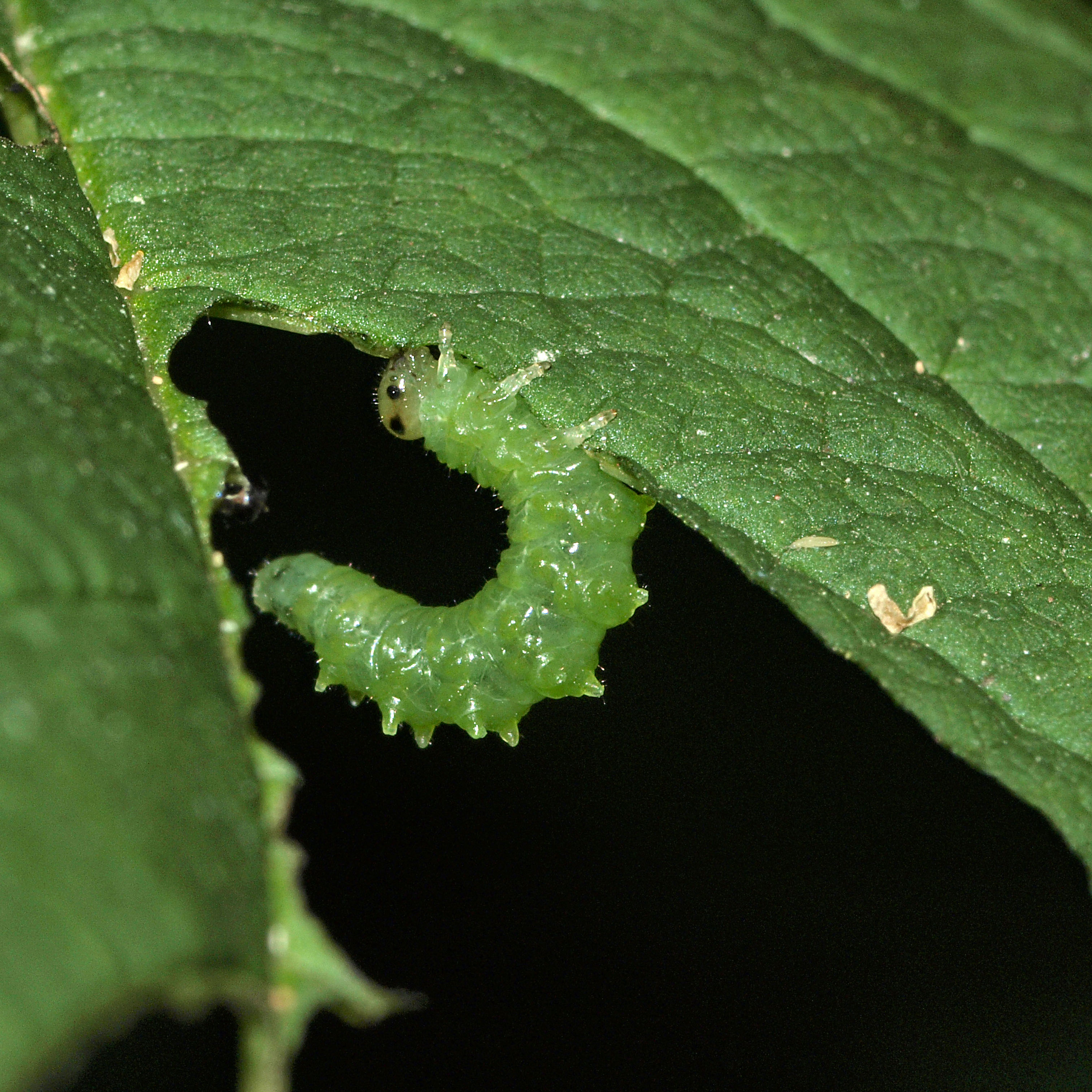
Nematus spiraeae

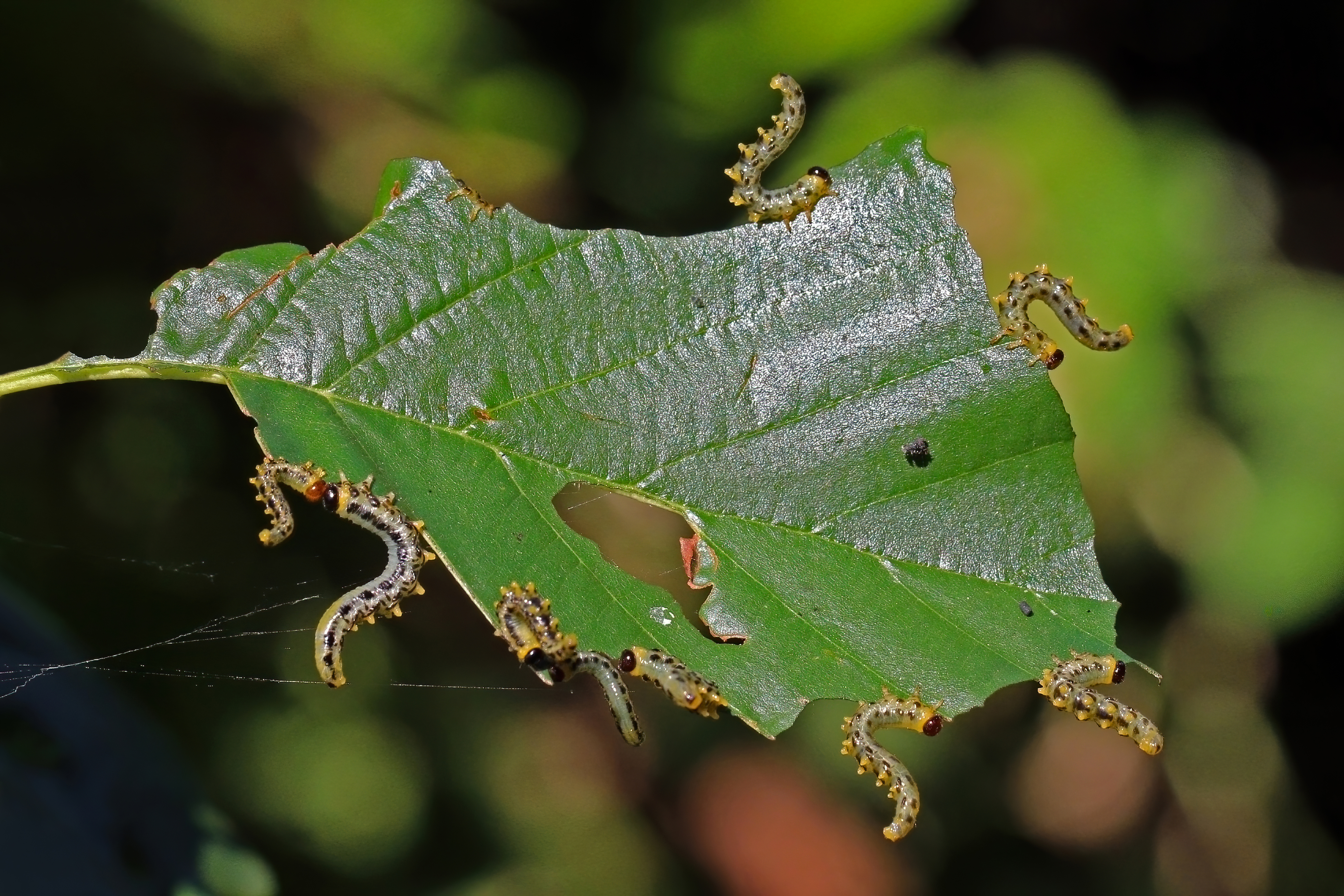
Nematus septentrionalis
Adult

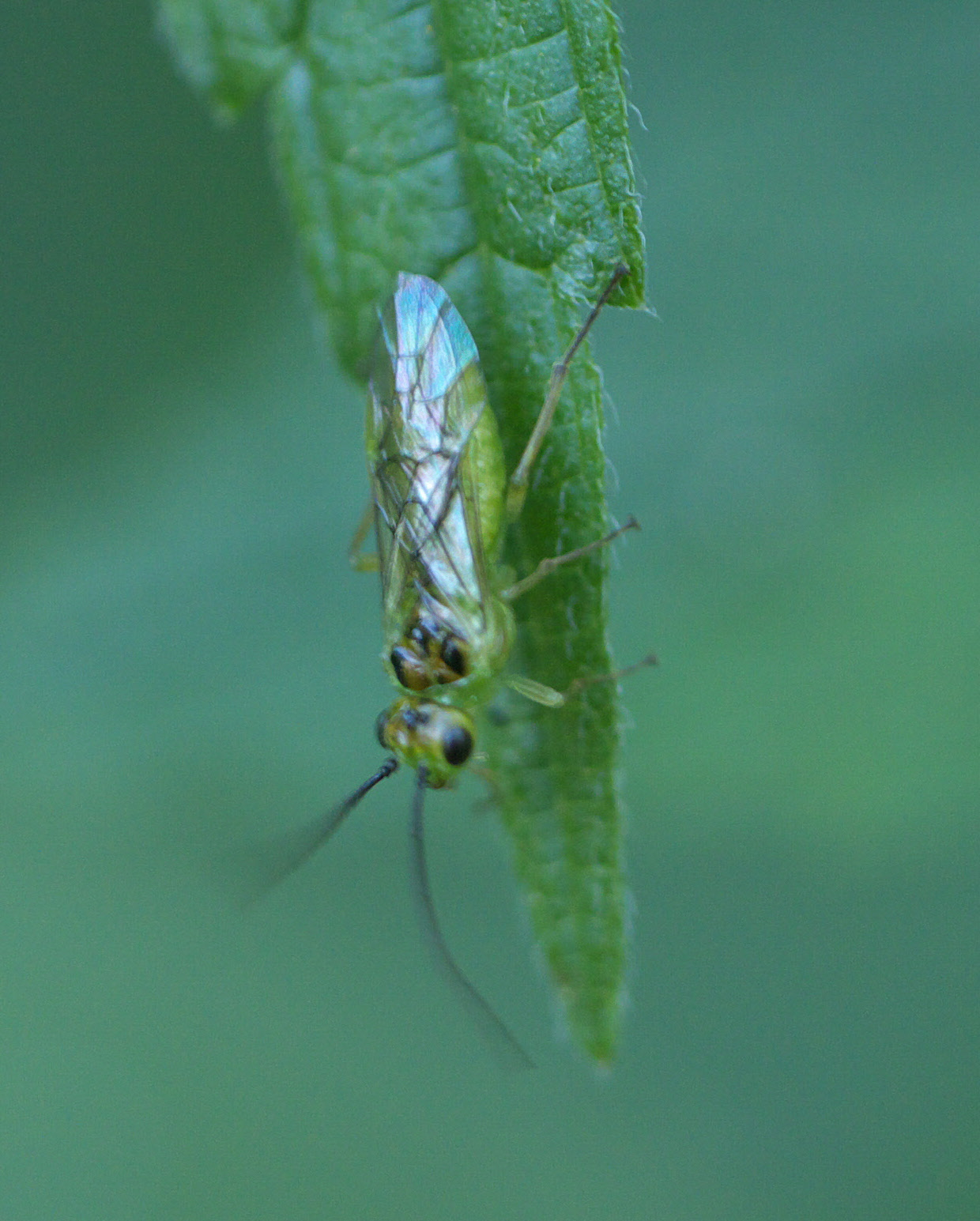

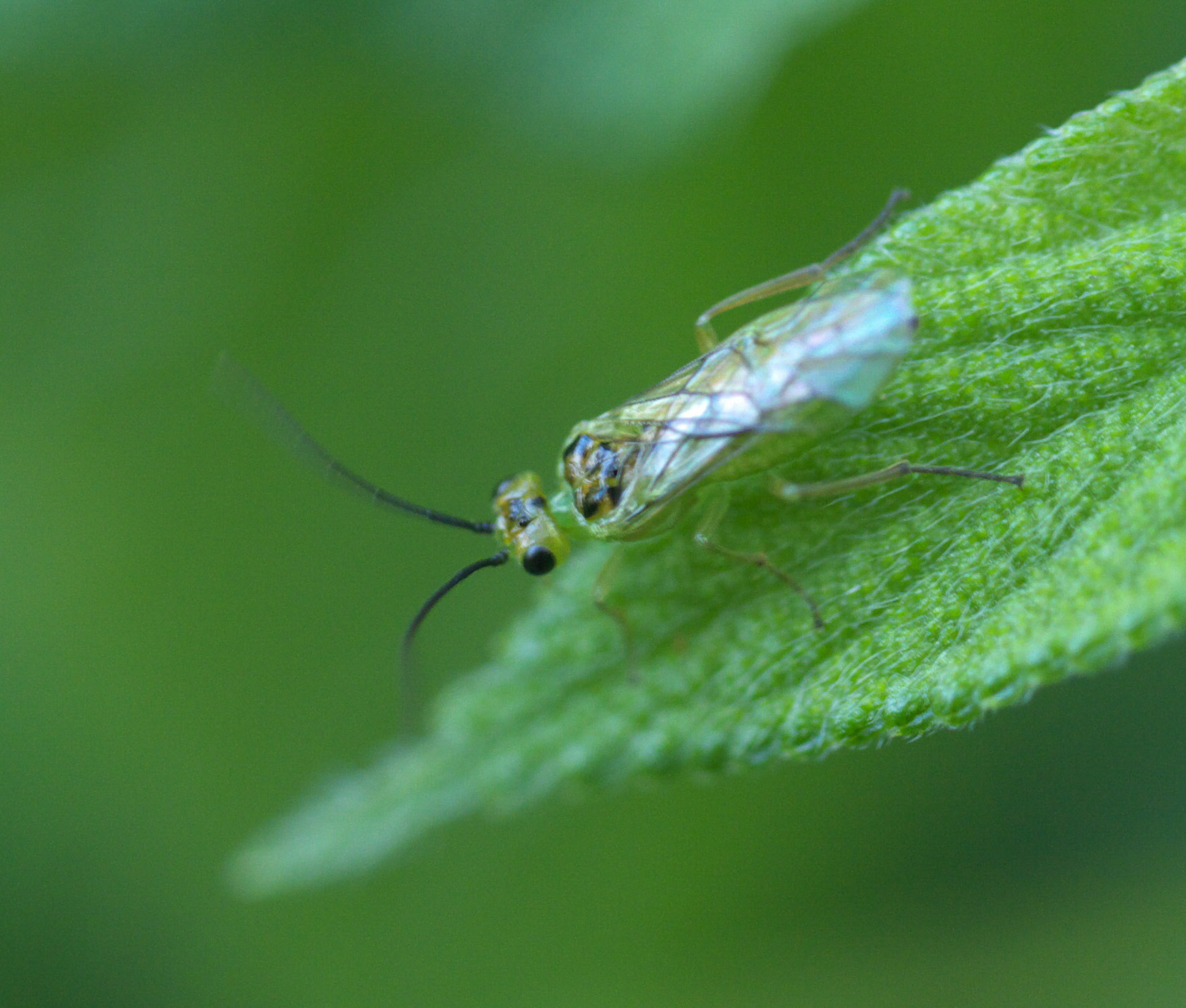

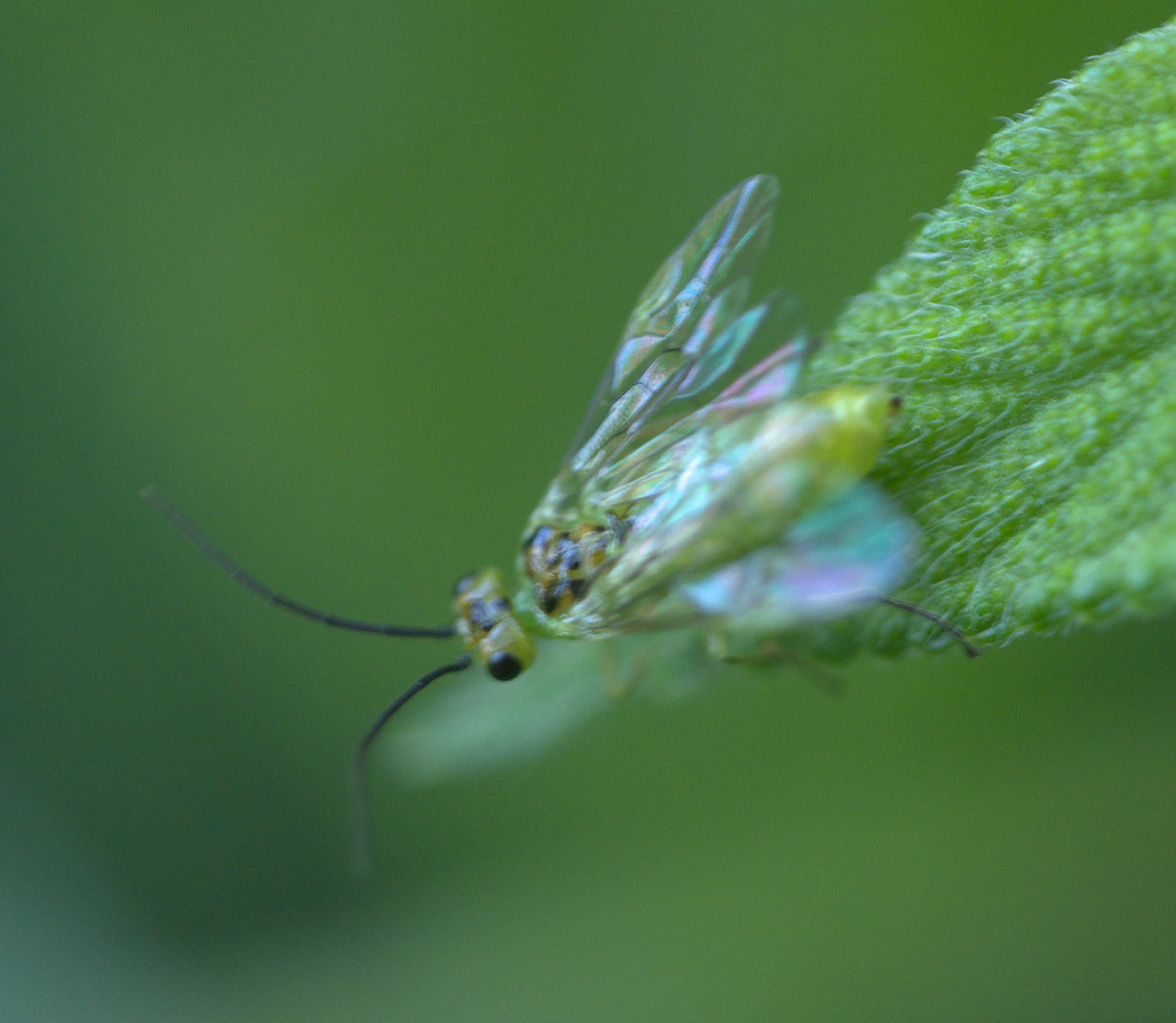

== See also ==
- List of Nematus species
