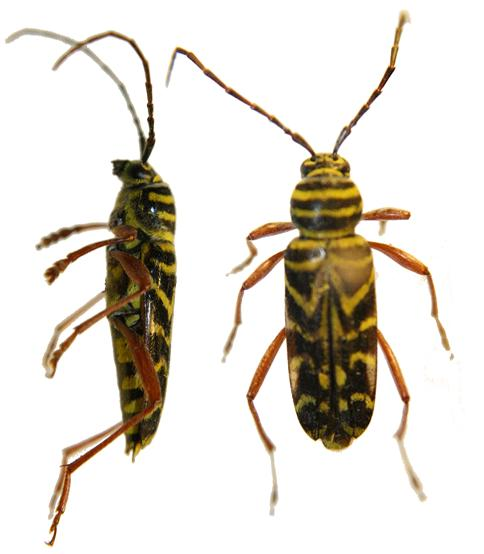
- Adult locust borer

Scientific classification
- Kingdom: Animalia
- Phylum: Arthropoda
- Class: Insecta
- Order: Coleoptera
- Suborder: Polyphaga
- Infraorder: Cucujiformia
- Family: Cerambycidae
- Genus: Megacyllene
- Species: M. robiniae

Binomial name
- Megacyllene robiniae (Forster, 1771)

Synonyms
- Megacyllene flexuosum (Fabricius, 1775); Megacyllene pictus (Drury, 1773)

= Megacyllene robiniae =

Species of beetle

Megacyllene robiniae, commonly known as the locust borer, is a species of longhorn beetle endemic to eastern North America. It is a serious pest of Robinia pseudoacacia, the black locust tree, with which it is sympatric.

== Etymology ==
The specific name, robiniae, is derived from the name Robinia, which is the generic name of the black locust tree, Robinia pseudoacacia, on which the larvae feed. The name Robinia was coined by Linnaeus to honor the royal French gardeners Jean Robin (father) and Vespasien Robin (son).

== Description ==
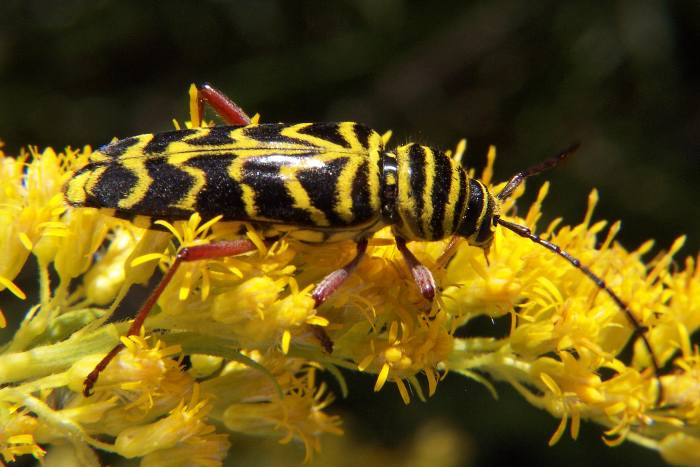
Adult on Solidago

From a distance, M. robiniae can easily be mistaken for a wasp or bee, due to its black and yellow striped pattern. It can also be mistaken for two closely related species: M. caryae and M. decora. The adult beetle can be 11 to 28 mm (0.43 to 1.10 in) long, and it has a W-shaped third stripe on the elytra. The antennae of both sexes are dark brown to black. The male's antennae are two-thirds its body length, and the female's are one-half. The legs are reddish brown. The full grown larvae are legless, white, and robust, growing to roughly 25 mm (0.98 in) long.

== Geographic range and habitat ==
Because there has been increasing use of R. pseudoacacia as an ornamental tree, the range of M. robiniae has expanded along with that of the tree. It is, however, still confined to North America and has not been recorded on any other continent where black locust has been introduced.

The beetle can be found almost anywhere that unprotected black locust trees grow, and the beetle is often more abundant when Solidago, commonly called goldenrod, is also present. Adults feed on the pollen of goldenrod. Because of the adults' floral preferences, they tend to stay in uncultivated fields and meadows.

== Life cycle and diet ==
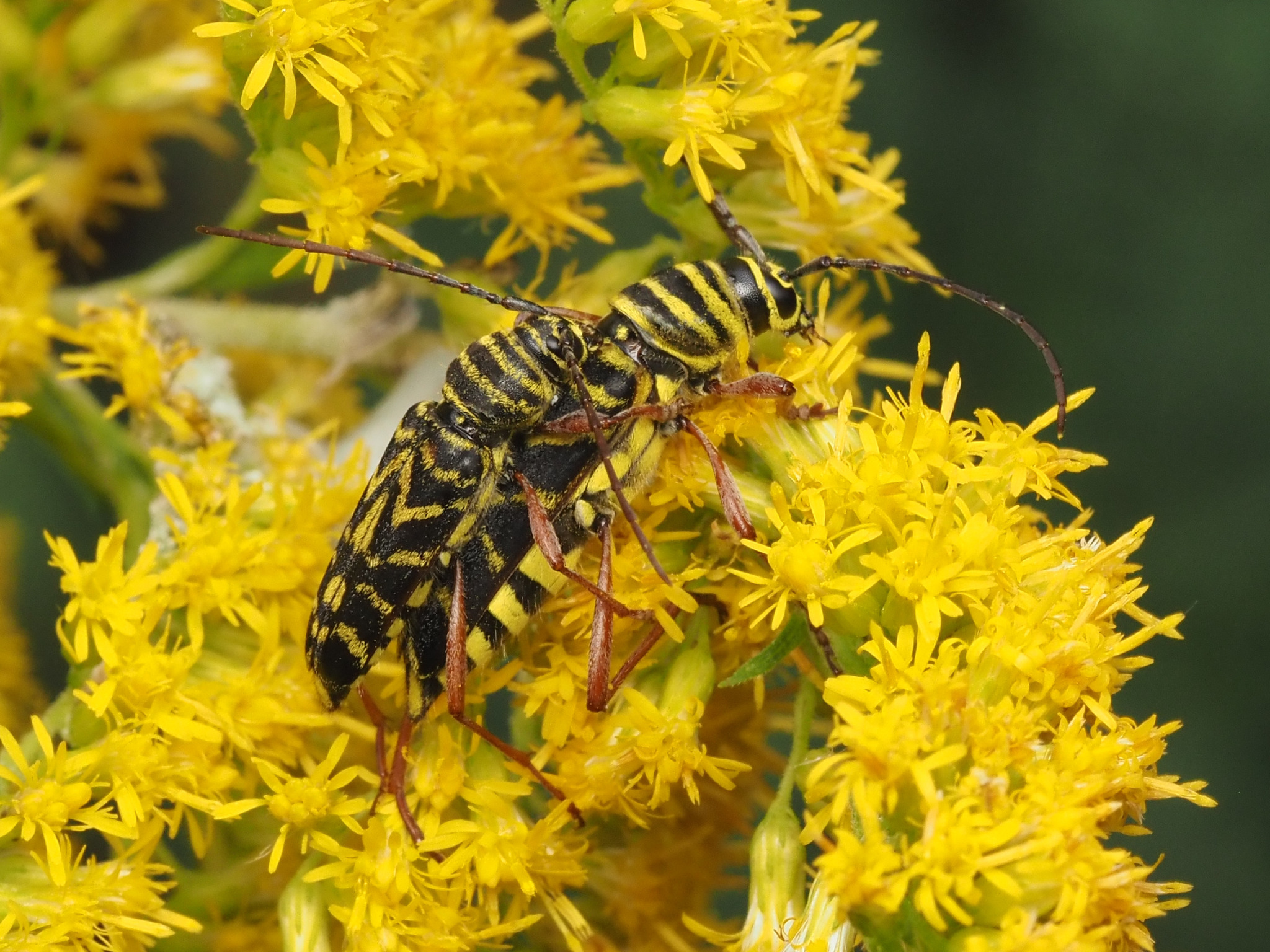
Male (left) and female (right) mating

The females are often found running up and down black locust trunks in search of wounds in which to lay their eggs in the fall. Both sexes are most common from late day to dusk. Adults feed on pollen of goldenrods of the genus Solidago. They lay eggs in crevices and near wounds of the locust tree. The eggs hatch and the larvae spend the winter hibernating within the bark. Once winter ends, the larvae burrow into the tree trunk and start to tunnel. These tunnels are around 10 cm (3.9 in) long by 7 mm (0.28 in) wide, and serve as a primary infection site for wind-borne spores of the fungus Fulvifomes robiniae, which causes a damaging heart rot disease of Robinia species, causing them to be more susceptible to wind damage. The larvae overwinter within the tree and then pupate in late July and early August, and adults start to emerge in late August and throughout September. Adults are generally active from August through October.

== Pest status ==
In 1900, due to attack by M. robiniae, the value of Robinia pseudoacacia (black locust tree) was reported to be practically destroyed in nearly all parts of the United States beyond the mountain forests which are its home. Were it not for these beetles and their larval tunnels promoting fungal infections, it could be one of the most valuable timber trees that could be planted in the northern and middle states; young trees grow quickly and vigorously for a number of years, but soon become stunted and diseased, and rarely live long enough to attain any commercial value. Currently, only one registered product, carbaryl, is effective against M. robiniae. It is applied in a single dose when adults are most active (August/September).
