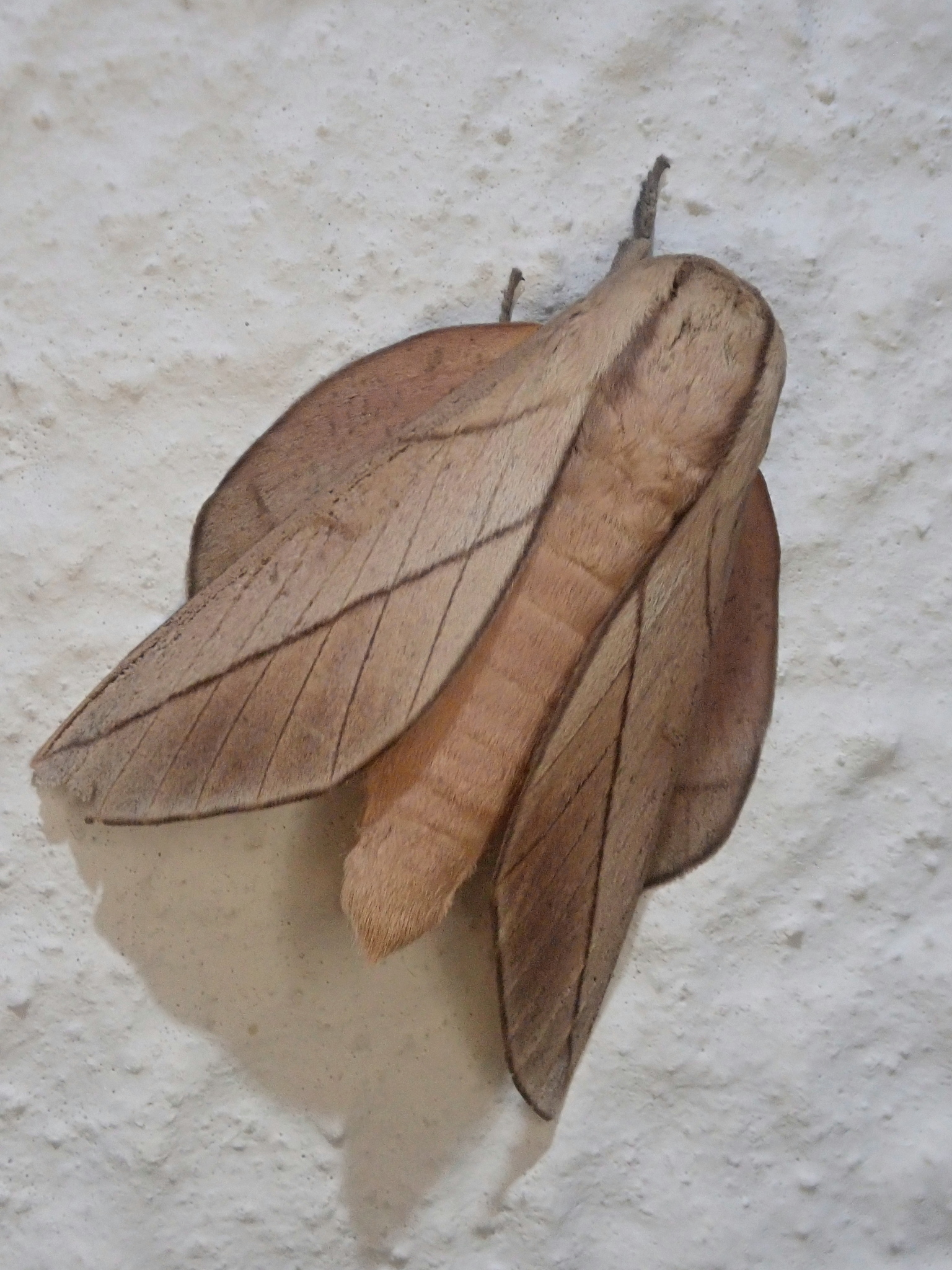

Scientific classification
- Kingdom: Animalia
- Phylum: Arthropoda
- Clade: Pancrustacea
- Class: Insecta
- Order: Lepidoptera
- Family: Saturniidae
- Genus: Citioica
- Species: C. anthonilis

Binomial name
- Citioica anthonilis (Herrich-Schäffer, 1854)

Synonyms
- Adelocephala anthonilis Herrich-Schäffer, [1854]

= Citioica anthonilis =

Species of moth

Citioica anthonilis is a species of moth in the family Saturniidae, which can be found from Central America to Brazil. The species was first described by Gottlieb August Wilhelm Herrich-Schäffer in 1854.

Adult males are gray.

== Ecology ==
The larvae feed on Robinia pseudoacacia and Salix caprea. They are green coloured, and have a black stripe on the side.
