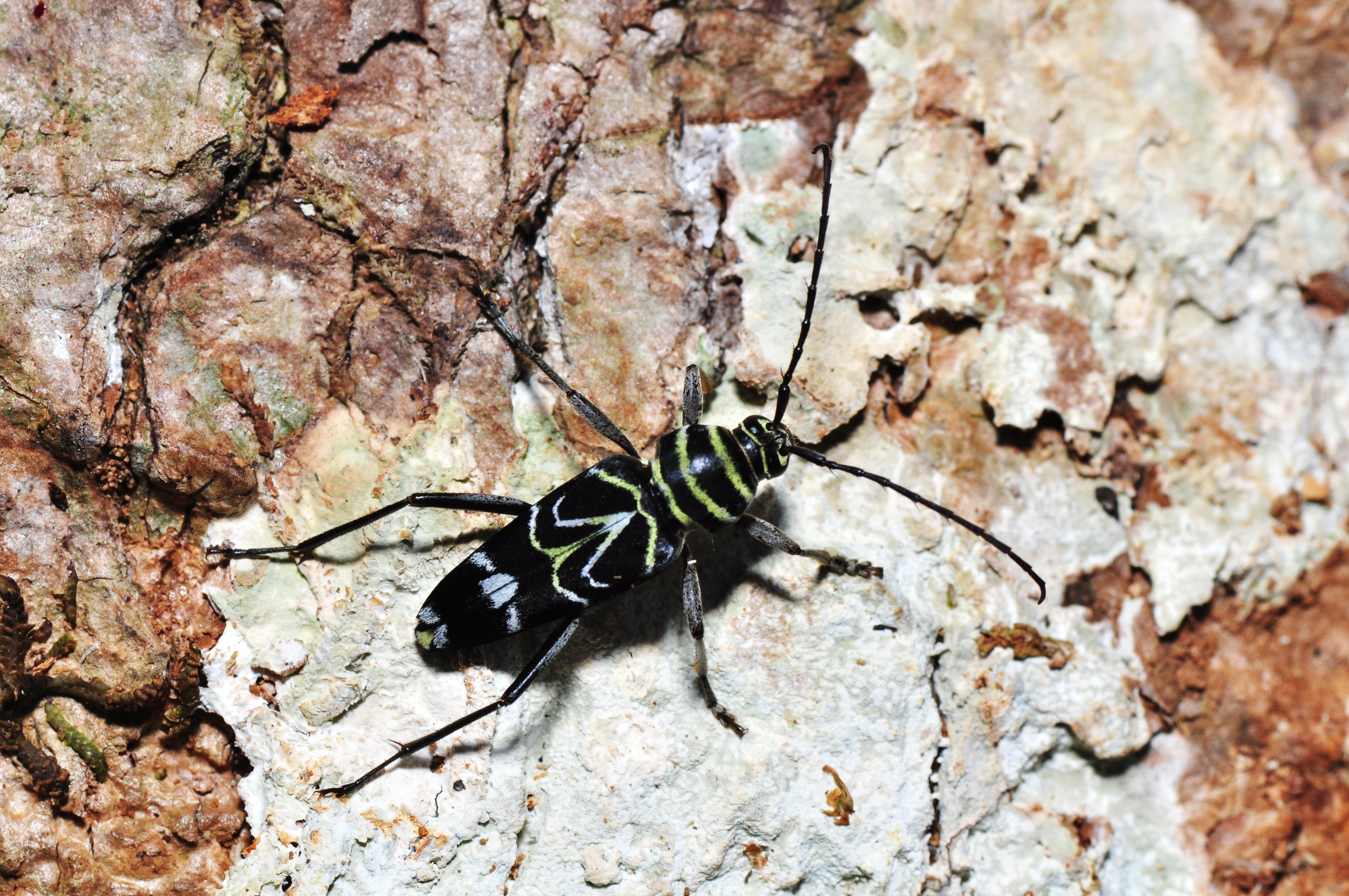

Scientific classification
- Kingdom: Animalia
- Phylum: Arthropoda
- Class: Insecta
- Order: Coleoptera
- Suborder: Polyphaga
- Infraorder: Cucujiformia
- Family: Cerambycidae
- Genus: Megacyllene
- Species: M. angulata

Binomial name
- Megacyllene angulata (Fabricius, 1775)

= Megacyllene angulata =

Species of beetle

Megacyllene angulata is a species of beetle in the family Cerambycidae. It was described by Johan Christian Fabricius in 1775.
