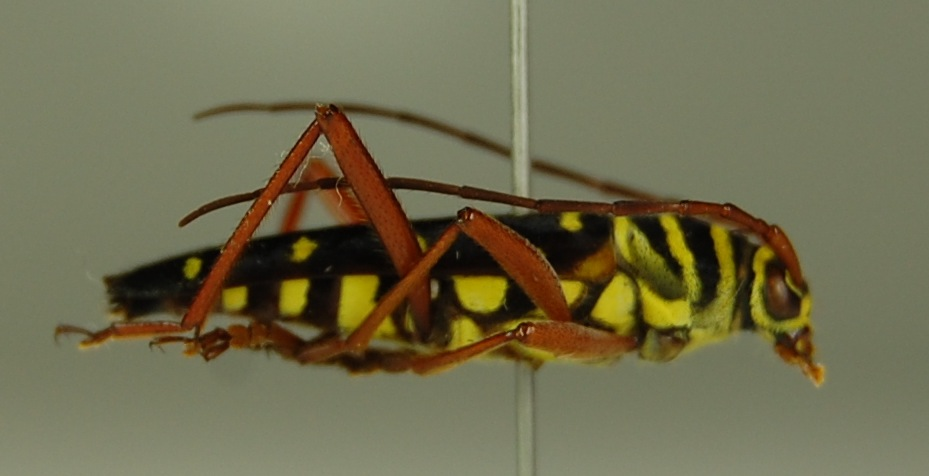

Scientific classification
- Kingdom: Animalia
- Phylum: Arthropoda
- Clade: Pancrustacea
- Class: Insecta
- Order: Coleoptera
- Suborder: Polyphaga
- Infraorder: Cucujiformia
- Family: Cerambycidae
- Genus: Megacyllene
- Species: M. proxima

Binomial name
- Megacyllene proxima (Laporte & Gory, 1835)

= Megacyllene proxima =

Species of beetle

Megacyllene proxima is a species of beetle in the family Cerambycidae. It was described by Laporte and Gory in 1835. It is found in Venezuela, Ecuador, Peru, Bolivia (Cochabamba, Santa Cruz), Brazil (Goiás, Minas Gerais, Espírito Santo, Rio de Janeiro, São Paulo, Paraná, Santa Catarina, Rio Grande do Sul), Paraguay and Argentina (Salta, Catamarca, Tucumán, Mendoza, Córdoba, San Luís, Santa Fé, Misiones).
