= Megacyllene globosa =

Scientific classification
- Kingdom: Animalia
- Phylum: Arthropoda
- Class: Insecta
- Order: Coleoptera
- Suborder: Polyphaga
- Infraorder: Cucujiformia
- Family: Cerambycidae
- Genus: Megacyllene
- Species: M. globosa

Binomial name
- Megacyllene globosa Aragao & Monne, 2011

Species of beetle

Megacyllene globosa is a species of beetle in the family Cerambycidae. It was described by Aragao and Monne in 2011.
