= Megacyllene powersi =

Scientific classification
- Kingdom: Animalia
- Phylum: Arthropoda
- Class: Insecta
- Order: Coleoptera
- Suborder: Polyphaga
- Infraorder: Cucujiformia
- Family: Cerambycidae
- Genus: Megacyllene
- Species: M. powersi

Binomial name
- Megacyllene powersi Linsley & Chemsak, 1963

Species of beetle

Megacyllene powersi is a species of beetle in the family Cerambycidae occurring in the Dakotas. It was described by Linsley and Chemsak in 1963.
