= Megacyllene mellyi =

Scientific classification
- Kingdom: Animalia
- Phylum: Arthropoda
- Class: Insecta
- Order: Coleoptera
- Suborder: Polyphaga
- Infraorder: Cucujiformia
- Family: Cerambycidae
- Genus: Megacyllene
- Species: M. mellyi

Binomial name
- Megacyllene mellyi (Chevrolat, 1862)

Species of beetle

Megacyllene mellyi is a species of beetle in the family Cerambycidae. It was described by Louis Alexandre Auguste Chevrolat in 1862.
