= Megacyllene tafivallensis =

Scientific classification
- Kingdom: Animalia
- Phylum: Arthropoda
- Class: Insecta
- Order: Coleoptera
- Suborder: Polyphaga
- Infraorder: Cucujiformia
- Family: Cerambycidae
- Genus: Megacyllene
- Species: M. tafivallensis

Binomial name
- Megacyllene tafivallensis Di Iorio, 1998

Species of beetle

Megacyllene tafivallensis is a species of beetle in the family Cerambycidae. It was described by Di Iorio in 1998.
