= Megacyllene designata =

Scientific classification
- Kingdom: Animalia
- Phylum: Arthropoda
- Class: Insecta
- Order: Coleoptera
- Suborder: Polyphaga
- Infraorder: Cucujiformia
- Family: Cerambycidae
- Genus: Megacyllene
- Species: M. designata

Binomial name
- Megacyllene designata (Chevrolat, 1862)

Species of beetle

Megacyllene designata is a species of beetle in the family Cerambycidae. It was described by Louis Alexandre Auguste Chevrolat in 1862.
