= Megacyllene ebenina =

Scientific classification
- Kingdom: Animalia
- Phylum: Arthropoda
- Class: Insecta
- Order: Coleoptera
- Suborder: Polyphaga
- Infraorder: Cucujiformia
- Family: Cerambycidae
- Genus: Megacyllene
- Species: M. ebenina

Binomial name
- Megacyllene ebenina Monne & Napp, 2004

Species of beetle

Megacyllene ebenina is a species of beetle in the family Cerambycidae. It was described by Monne and Napp in 2004.
