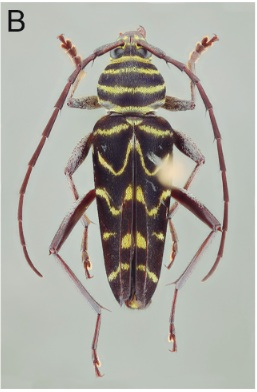

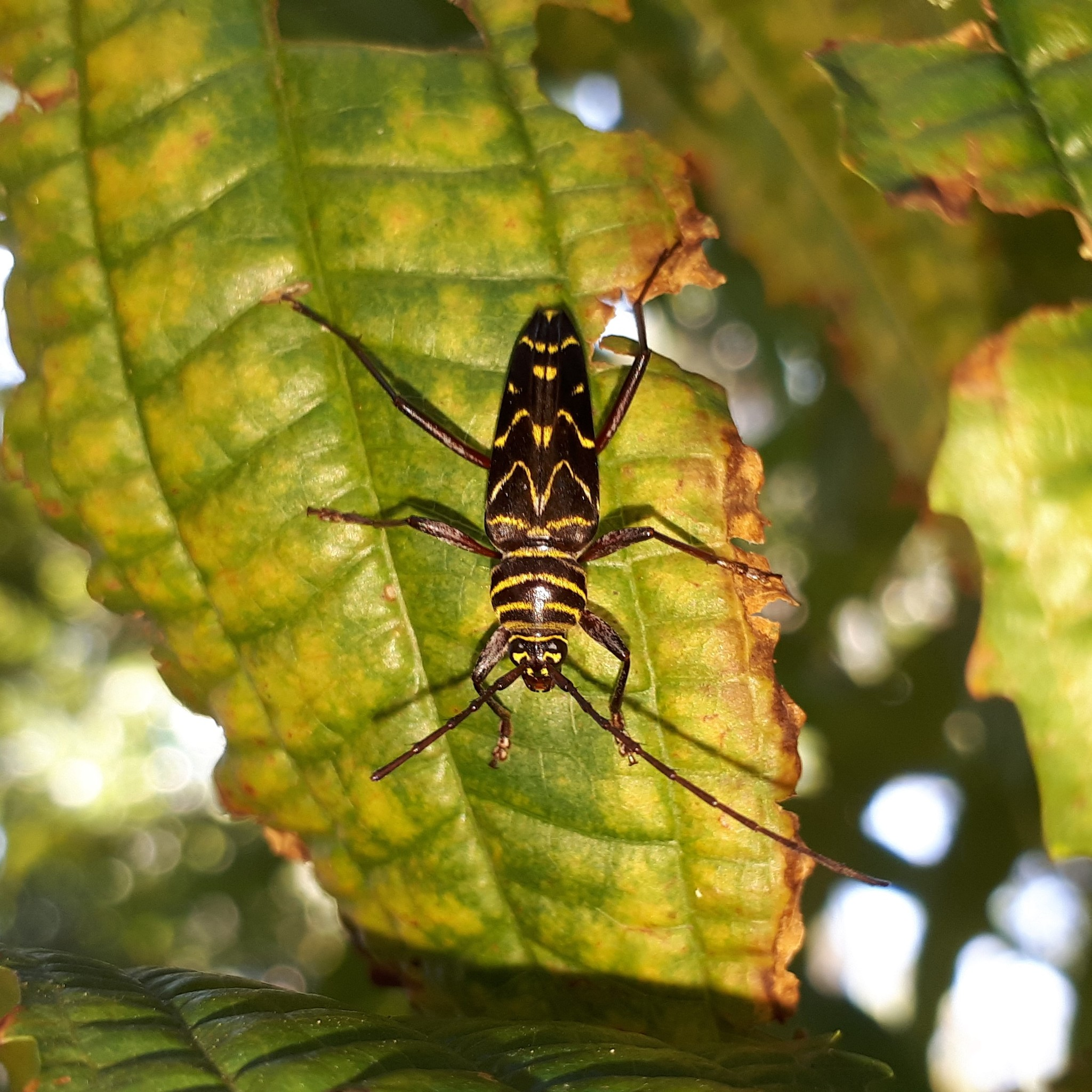

Scientific classification
- Kingdom: Animalia
- Phylum: Arthropoda
- Clade: Pancrustacea
- Class: Insecta
- Order: Coleoptera
- Suborder: Polyphaga
- Infraorder: Cucujiformia
- Family: Cerambycidae
- Genus: Megacyllene
- Species: M. acuta

Binomial name
- Megacyllene acuta (Germar, 1821)

Synonyms
- Clytus acutus Germar, 1821; Clytus rufipes Laporte & Gory, 1836; Cyllene consimilis Chevrolat, 1862; Cyllene exsanguis Chevrolat, 1862

= Megacyllene acuta =

Species of beetle

Megacyllene acuta is a species of beetle in the family Cerambycidae. It was described by Ernst Friedrich Germar in 1821. It is found in Bolivia, Brazil, Paraguay, Argentina and Uruguay.
