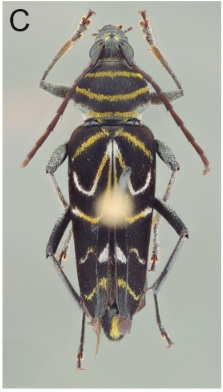

Scientific classification
- Kingdom: Animalia
- Phylum: Arthropoda
- Clade: Pancrustacea
- Class: Insecta
- Order: Coleoptera
- Suborder: Polyphaga
- Infraorder: Cucujiformia
- Family: Cerambycidae
- Genus: Megacyllene
- Species: M. falsa

Binomial name
- Megacyllene falsa (Chevrolat, 1862)

Synonyms
- Cyllene falsa Chevrolat, 1862

= Megacyllene falsa =

Species of beetle

Megacyllene falsa is a species of beetle in the family Cerambycidae. It was described by Chevrolat in 1862. It is found in Brazil, Paraguay, Argentina and Uruguay.
