= Megacyllene angulifera =

Scientific classification
- Kingdom: Animalia
- Phylum: Arthropoda
- Class: Insecta
- Order: Coleoptera
- Suborder: Polyphaga
- Infraorder: Cucujiformia
- Family: Cerambycidae
- Genus: Megacyllene
- Species: M. angulifera

Binomial name
- Megacyllene angulifera (Casey, 1912)

Synonyms
- Megacyllene comanchei Rice & Morris, 1992

Species of beetle

Megacyllene angulifera is a species of beetle in the family Cerambycidae occurring in central North America from Alberta to Texas. It was described by Casey in 1912.
