= Megacyllene snowi =

Scientific classification
- Kingdom: Animalia
- Phylum: Arthropoda
- Class: Insecta
- Order: Coleoptera
- Suborder: Polyphaga
- Infraorder: Cucujiformia
- Family: Cerambycidae
- Genus: Megacyllene
- Species: M. snowi

Binomial name
- Megacyllene snowi (Casey, 1912)

Species of beetle

Megacyllene snowi is a species of beetle in the family Cerambycidae. It was described by Casey in 1912.
