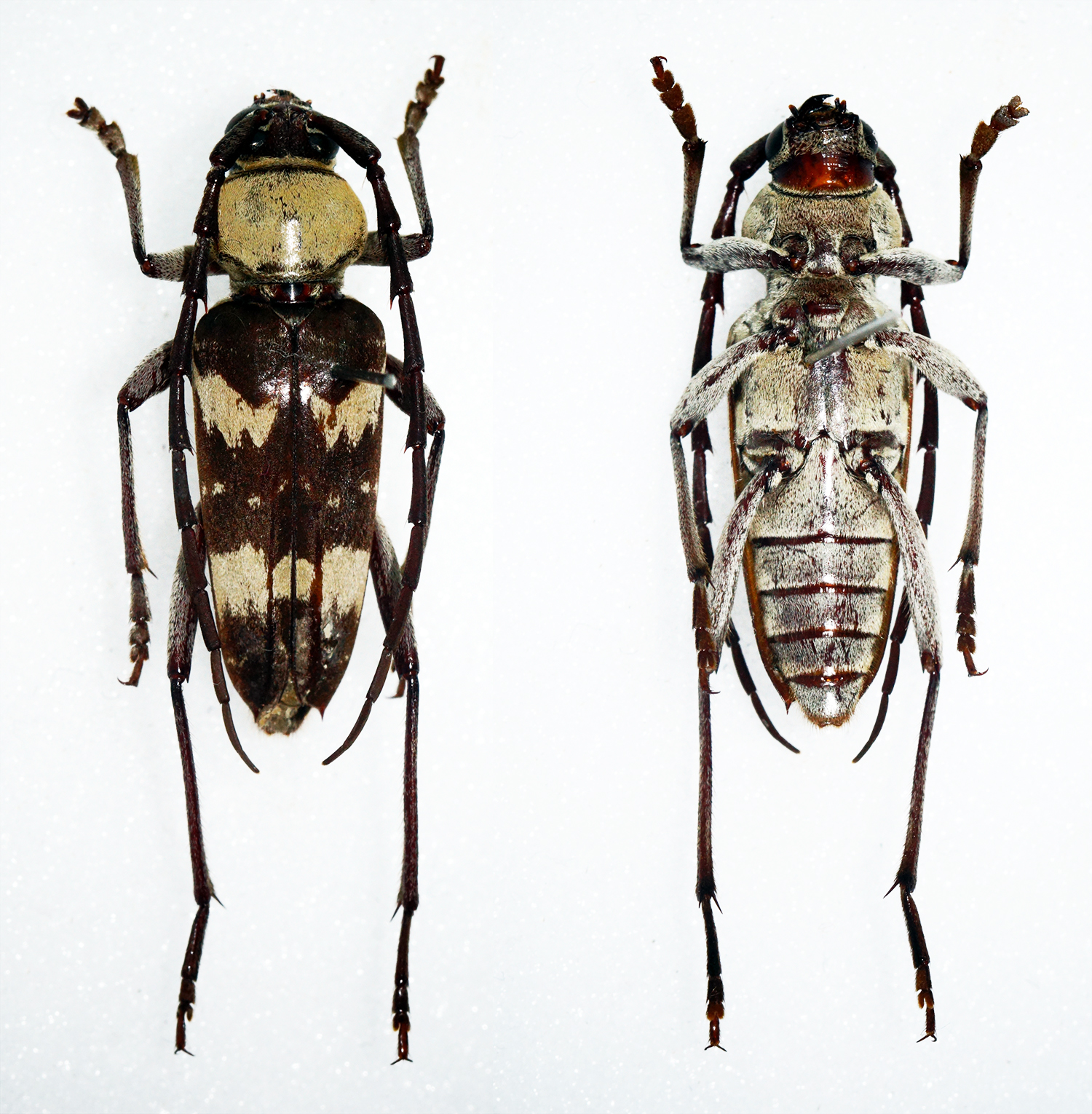

Scientific classification
- Kingdom: Animalia
- Phylum: Arthropoda
- Class: Insecta
- Order: Coleoptera
- Suborder: Polyphaga
- Infraorder: Cucujiformia
- Family: Cerambycidae
- Genus: Megacyllene
- Species: M. antennata

Binomial name
- Megacyllene antennata (White, 1855)

= Megacyllene antennata =

Species of beetle

Megacyllene antennata is a species of beetle in the family Cerambycidae occurring in the southwestern United States, where its larvae feed on mesquite trees. It was described by White in 1855.
