= Megacyllene menalaspis =

Scientific classification
- Kingdom: Animalia
- Phylum: Arthropoda
- Clade: Pancrustacea
- Class: Insecta
- Order: Coleoptera
- Suborder: Polyphaga
- Infraorder: Cucujiformia
- Family: Cerambycidae
- Genus: Megacyllene
- Species: M. menalaspis

Binomial name
- Megacyllene menalaspis (Chevrolat, 1862)

Species of beetle

Megacyllene menalaspis is a species of beetle in the family Cerambycidae. It was described by Chevrolat in 1862. It has distinct red legs and attennea, which are as long as its body. It has a black 3 part abdomen covered. The head and midsection are covered in yellow stripes, like an inverted bee. Its back section has yellow spots in a pattern reminiscent of spots on butterfly wings. It is has been documented in Peru.
