= Megacyllene castroi =

Scientific classification
- Kingdom: Animalia
- Phylum: Arthropoda
- Class: Insecta
- Order: Coleoptera
- Suborder: Polyphaga
- Infraorder: Cucujiformia
- Family: Cerambycidae
- Genus: Megacyllene
- Species: M. castroi

Binomial name
- Megacyllene castroi Prosen, 1947

Species of beetle

Megacyllene castroi is a species of beetle in the family Cerambycidae. It was described by Prosen in 1947.
