= Megacyllene abnormis =

Scientific classification
- Kingdom: Animalia
- Phylum: Arthropoda
- Class: Insecta
- Order: Coleoptera
- Suborder: Polyphaga
- Infraorder: Cucujiformia
- Family: Cerambycidae
- Genus: Megacyllene
- Species: M. abnormis

Binomial name
- Megacyllene abnormis (Aurivillius, 1920)

Species of beetle

Megacyllene abnormis is a species of beetle in the family Cerambycidae. It was described by Per Olof Christopher Aurivillius in 1920.
