= Megacyllene unicoloricollis =

Scientific classification
- Kingdom: Animalia
- Phylum: Arthropoda
- Class: Insecta
- Order: Coleoptera
- Suborder: Polyphaga
- Infraorder: Cucujiformia
- Family: Cerambycidae
- Genus: Megacyllene
- Species: M. unicoloricollis

Binomial name
- Megacyllene unicoloricollis E. Fuchs, 1961

Species of beetle

Megacyllene unicoloricollis is a species of beetle in the family Cerambycidae. It was described by Ernst Fuchs in 1961.
