= Megacyllene multiguttata =

Scientific classification
- Kingdom: Animalia
- Phylum: Arthropoda
- Class: Insecta
- Order: Coleoptera
- Suborder: Polyphaga
- Infraorder: Cucujiformia
- Family: Cerambycidae
- Genus: Megacyllene
- Species: M. multiguttata

Binomial name
- Megacyllene multiguttata (Burmeister, 1865)

Species of beetle

Megacyllene multiguttata is a species of beetle in the family Cerambycidae. It was described by Hermann Burmeister in 1865.
