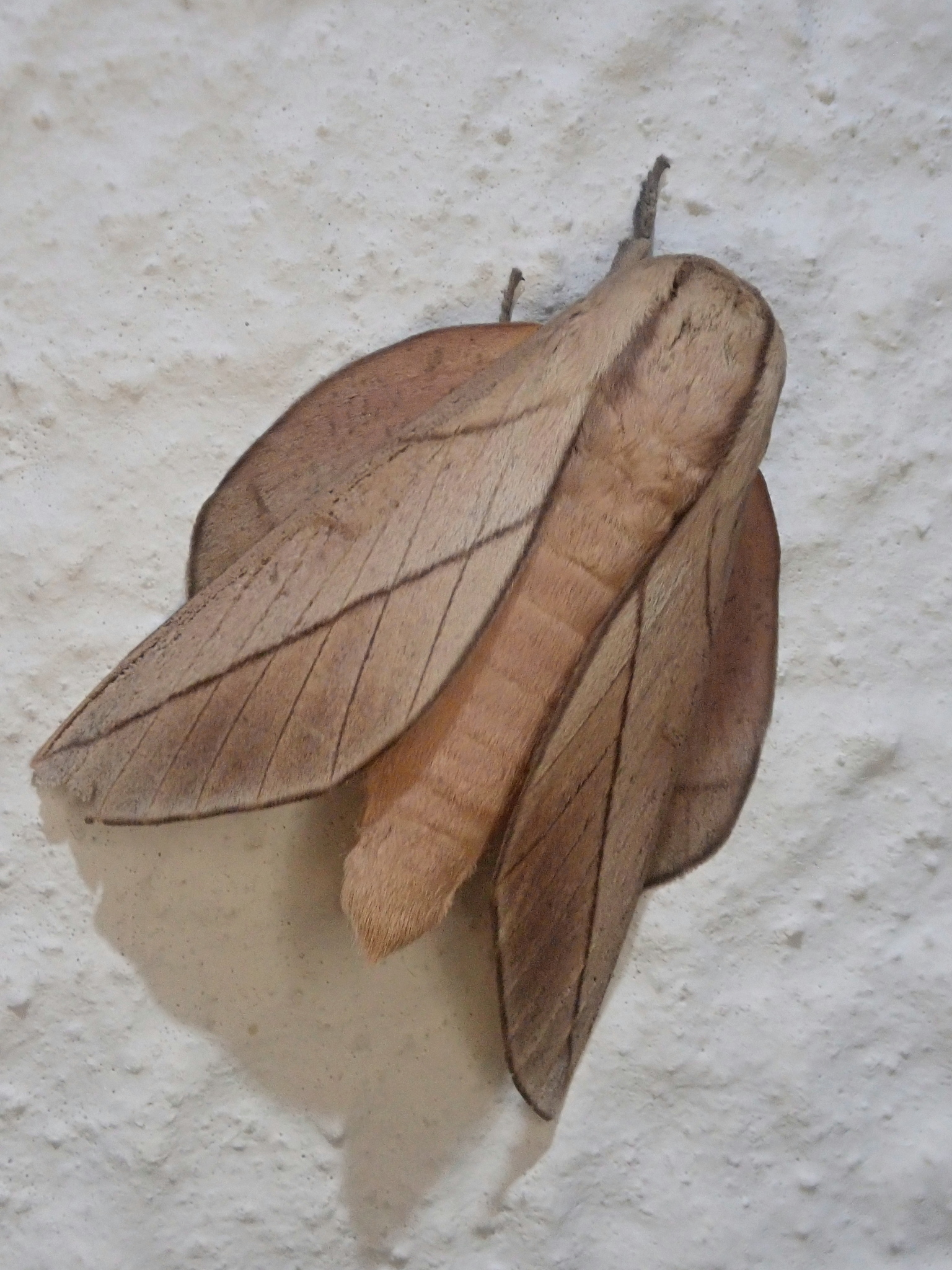
- Citioica anthonilis

Scientific classification
- Kingdom: Animalia
- Phylum: Arthropoda
- Clade: Pancrustacea
- Class: Insecta
- Order: Lepidoptera
- Family: Saturniidae
- Subfamily: Ceratocampinae
- Genus: Citioica; Travassos & Noronha, 1965

Species
- See text

= Citioica =

Genus of moths

Citioica is a genus of moths in the family Saturniidae.

== Species ==
The genus includes the following species:

- Citioica anthonilis (Herrich-Schäffer, 1854) — Ecuador, Mexico
- Citioica guyaensis Brechlin & Meister, 2011
- Citioica homonea (Rothschild, 1907) — Ecuador
- Citioica rubrocanescens Brechlin & Meister, 2011
