= Megacyllene murina =

Scientific classification
- Kingdom: Animalia
- Phylum: Arthropoda
- Class: Insecta
- Order: Coleoptera
- Suborder: Polyphaga
- Infraorder: Cucujiformia
- Family: Cerambycidae
- Genus: Megacyllene
- Species: M. murina

Binomial name
- Megacyllene murina (Burmeister, 1879)

Species of beetle

Megacyllene murina is a species of beetle in the family Cerambycidae. It was described by Hermann Burmeister in 1879.
