= Megacyllene sahlbergi =

Scientific classification
- Kingdom: Animalia
- Phylum: Arthropoda
- Class: Insecta
- Order: Coleoptera
- Suborder: Polyphaga
- Infraorder: Cucujiformia
- Family: Cerambycidae
- Genus: Megacyllene
- Species: M. sahlbergi

Binomial name
- Megacyllene sahlbergi (Aurivillius, 1913)

Species of beetle

Megacyllene sahlbergi is a species of beetle in the family Cerambycidae. It was described by Per Olof Christopher Aurivillius in 1913.
