= Megacyllene trifasciata =

Scientific classification
- Kingdom: Animalia
- Phylum: Arthropoda
- Class: Insecta
- Order: Coleoptera
- Suborder: Polyphaga
- Infraorder: Cucujiformia
- Family: Cerambycidae
- Genus: Megacyllene
- Species: M. trifasciata

Binomial name
- Megacyllene trifasciata Viana, 1994

Species of beetle

Megacyllene trifasciata is a species of beetle in the family Cerambycidae. It was described by Viana in 1994.
