= Megacyllene unicolor =

Scientific classification
- Kingdom: Animalia
- Phylum: Arthropoda
- Class: Insecta
- Order: Coleoptera
- Suborder: Polyphaga
- Infraorder: Cucujiformia
- Family: Cerambycidae
- Genus: Megacyllene
- Species: M. unicolor

Binomial name
- Megacyllene unicolor E. Fuchs, 1955

Species of beetle

Megacyllene unicolor is a species of beetle in the family Cerambycidae. It was described by Ernst Fuchs in 1955.
