= Megacyllene costaricensis =

Scientific classification
- Kingdom: Animalia
- Phylum: Arthropoda
- Class: Insecta
- Order: Coleoptera
- Suborder: Polyphaga
- Infraorder: Cucujiformia
- Family: Cerambycidae
- Genus: Megacyllene
- Species: M. costaricensis

Binomial name
- Megacyllene costaricensis (Thomson, 1860)

Species of beetle

Megacyllene costaricensis is a species of beetle in the family Cerambycidae. It was described by Thomson in 1860.
