= Megacyllene ellifranziana =

Scientific classification
- Kingdom: Animalia
- Phylum: Arthropoda
- Class: Insecta
- Order: Coleoptera
- Suborder: Polyphaga
- Infraorder: Cucujiformia
- Family: Cerambycidae
- Genus: Megacyllene
- Species: M. ellifranziana

Binomial name
- Megacyllene ellifranziana (E. Fuchs, 1961)

Species of beetle

Megacyllene ellifranziana is a species of beetle in the family Cerambycidae. It was described by Ernst Fuchs in 1961.
