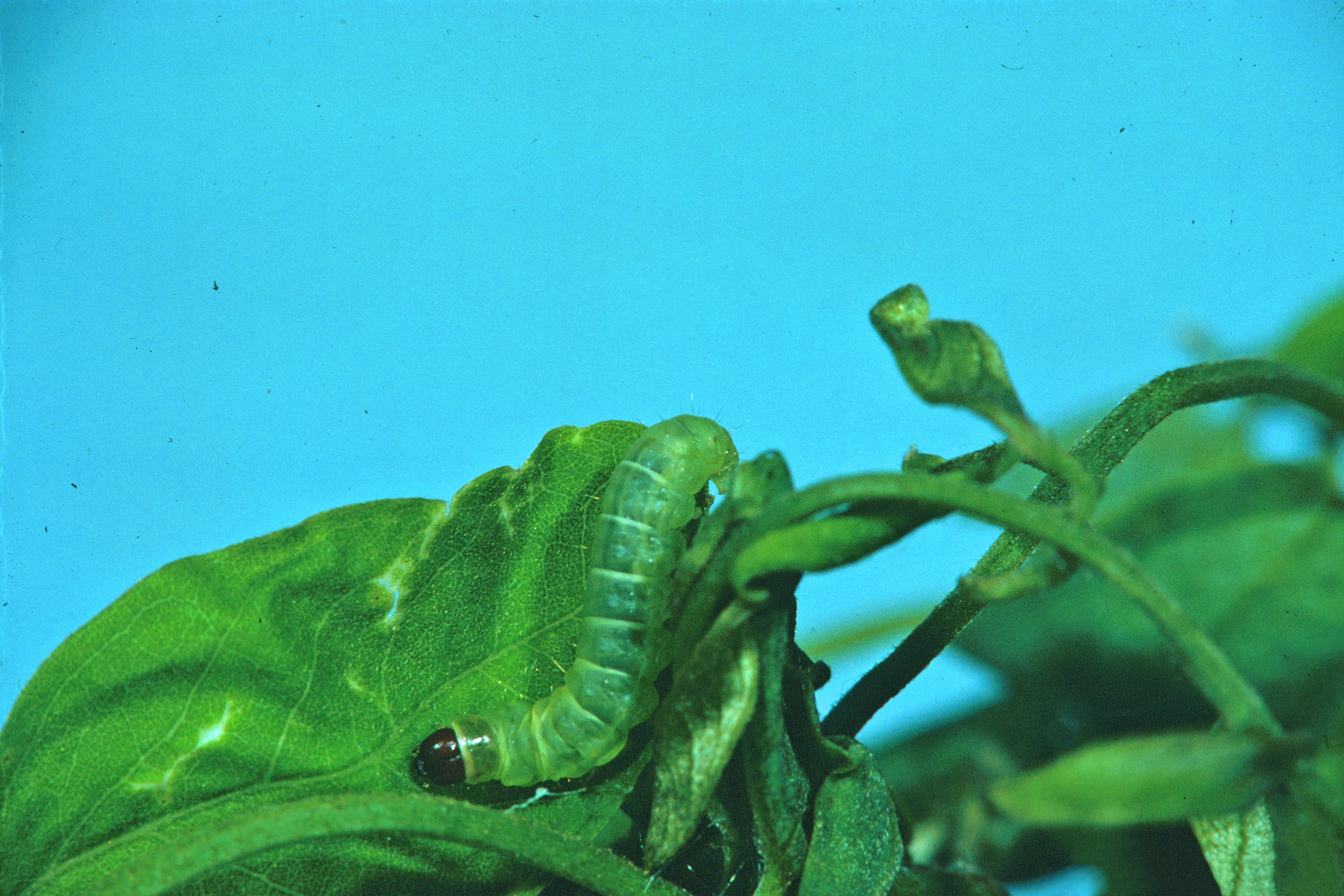

Scientific classification
- Kingdom: Animalia
- Phylum: Arthropoda
- Clade: Pancrustacea
- Class: Insecta
- Order: Lepidoptera
- Family: Depressariidae
- Genus: Agonopterix
- Species: A. robiniella

Binomial name
- Agonopterix robiniella (Packard, 1869)

Synonyms
- Depressaria robiniella Packard, 1869; Depressaria hilarella Zeller, 1873

= Agonopterix robiniella =

Species of moth

Agonopterix robiniella, the four-dotted agonopterix moth or locust leaf roller, is a moth of the family Depressariidae. It is found in North America, where it has been recorded to appear in places from Nova Scotia to Georgia, west to Oklahoma, north to Illinois, Michigan and southern Ontario.

The wingspan is about 16–20 mm. The forewings are yellow, mottled and overlaid with brick red and irrorated (speckled) and shaded with fuscous and black. There are two black discal spots at the basal third and a poorly defined dark band before the termen. There is also a series of indistinct blackish spots along the costa and around the termen. The hindwings are greyish fuscous with a narrowly blackish fuscous terminal edge. Adults are on wing from June to October.

The larvae feed on the leaves of Robinia pseudoacacia. The larvae have a green body with a thin pale band across each abdominal segment and a black head.
