= Megacyllene lutosa =

Scientific classification
- Kingdom: Animalia
- Phylum: Arthropoda
- Class: Insecta
- Order: Coleoptera
- Suborder: Polyphaga
- Infraorder: Cucujiformia
- Family: Cerambycidae
- Genus: Megacyllene
- Species: M. lutosa

Binomial name
- Megacyllene lutosa (LeConte, 1861)

Species of beetle

Megacyllene lutosa is a rare species of beetle in the family Cerambycidae occurring primarily in the US state of Kansas. It was described by John Lawrence LeConte in 1861.
