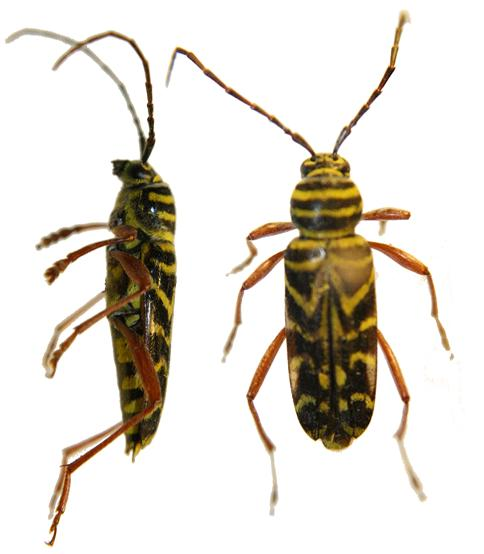
- Megacyllene robiniae

Scientific classification
- Kingdom: Animalia
- Phylum: Arthropoda
- Class: Insecta
- Order: Coleoptera
- Suborder: Polyphaga
- Infraorder: Cucujiformia
- Family: Cerambycidae
- Subfamily: Cerambycinae
- Tribe: Clytini
- Genus: Megacyllene; Casey, 1912

= Megacyllene =

Genus of beetles

Megacyllene is a genus of beetles in the family Cerambycidae, containing the following species:

- Megacyllene abnormis (Aurivillius, 1920)
- Megacyllene acuta (Germar, 1821)
- Megacyllene anacantha (Chevrolat, 1862)
- Megacyllene andesiana (Casey, 1912)
- Megacyllene angulata (Fabricius, 1775)
- Megacyllene angulifera (Casey, 1912)
- Megacyllene antennata (White, 1855)
- Megacyllene bonplandi (Gounelle, 1911)
- Megacyllene boryi (Laporte & Gory, 1835)
- Megacyllene caryae (Gahan, 1908)
- Megacyllene castanea (Laporte & Gory, 1835)
- Megacyllene castroi Prosen, 1947
- Megacyllene chalybeata (White, 1855)
- Megacyllene cleroides (Melzer, 1931)
- Megacyllene comanchei Rice & Morris, 1992
- Megacyllene congener (Laporte & Gory, 1835)
- Megacyllene costaricensis (Thomson, 1860)
- Megacyllene decora (Olivier, 1795)
- Megacyllene designata (Chevrolat, 1862)
- Megacyllene ebenina Monne & Napp, 2004
- Megacyllene ellifranziana (Fuchs, 1961)
- Megacyllene falsa (Chevrolat, 1862)
- Megacyllene gaucha Martins & Galileo, 2011
- Megacyllene globosa Aragao & Monne, 2011
- Megacyllene guarani Aragao & Monne, 2011
- Megacyllene hoffmanni (Laporte & Gory, 1835)
- Megacyllene horioni Tippmann, 1960
- Megacyllene insignita Perroud, 1855
- Megacyllene lanei (Tippmann, 1953)
- Megacyllene latreillei (Laporte & Gory, 1835)
- Megacyllene lutosa (LeConte, 1861)
- Megacyllene magna Di Iorio, 1997
- Megacyllene mellyi (Chevrolat, 1862)
- Megacyllene menalaspis (Chevrolat, 1862)
- Megacyllene multiguttata (Burmeister, 1865)
- Megacyllene murina (Burmeister, 1879)
- Megacyllene neblinosa Di Iorio, 1995
- Megacyllene nebulosa Laporte & Gory, 1835
- Megacyllene nevermanni Martins & Galileo, 2008
- Megacyllene panamensis (Bates, 1885)
- Megacyllene powersi Linsley & Chemsak, 1963
- Megacyllene proxima (Laporte & Gory, 1835)
- Megacyllene punensis Martins & Galileo, 2008
- Megacyllene quinquefasciata (Melzer, 1931)
- Megacyllene robiniae (Forster, 1771)
- Megacyllene robusta Linsley & Chemsak, 1963
- Megacyllene rotundicollis Zajciw, 1963
- Megacyllene rufofemorata Di Iorio, 1997
- Megacyllene sahlbergi (Aurivillius, 1913)
- Megacyllene snowi (Casey, 1912)
- Megacyllene spixii (Laporte & Gory, 1835)
- Megacyllene tafivallensis Di Iorio, 1998
- Megacyllene trifasciata Viana, 1994
- Megacyllene unicolor Fuchs, 1955
- Megacyllene unicoloricollis Fuchs, 1961
