= Megacyllene magna =

Scientific classification
- Kingdom: Animalia
- Phylum: Arthropoda
- Class: Insecta
- Order: Coleoptera
- Suborder: Polyphaga
- Infraorder: Cucujiformia
- Family: Cerambycidae
- Genus: Megacyllene
- Species: M. magna

Binomial name
- Megacyllene magna Di Iorio, 1997

Species of beetle

Megacyllene magna is a species of beetle in the family Cerambycidae. It was described by Di Iorio in 1997.
