= Megacyllene insignita =

Scientific classification
- Kingdom: Animalia
- Phylum: Arthropoda
- Class: Insecta
- Order: Coleoptera
- Suborder: Polyphaga
- Infraorder: Cucujiformia
- Family: Cerambycidae
- Genus: Megacyllene
- Species: M. insignita

Binomial name
- Megacyllene insignita Perroud, 1855

Species of beetle

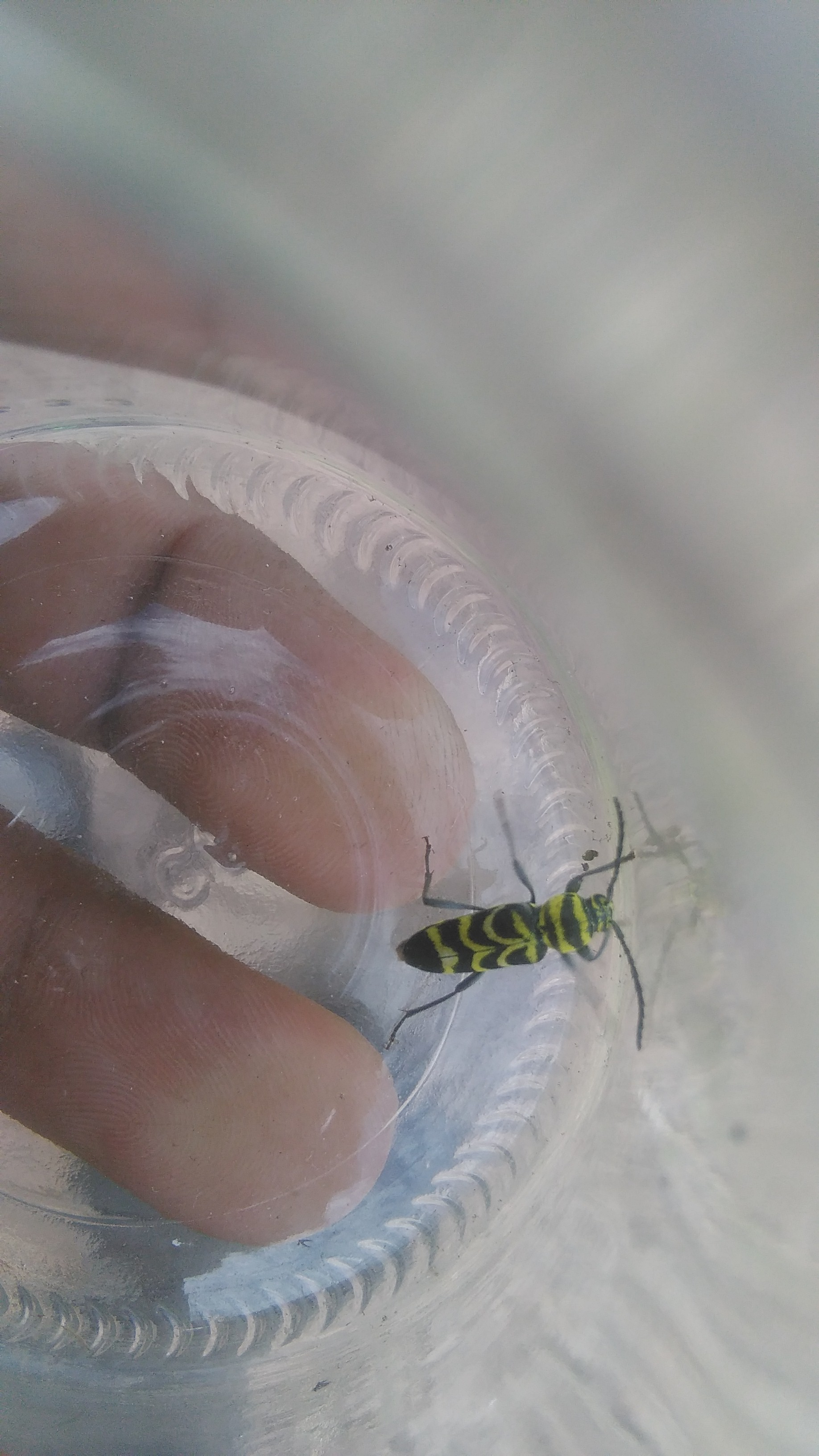
Megacyllene insignita

Megacyllene insignita is a species of beetle in the family Cerambycidae. It was described by Perroud in 1855.
