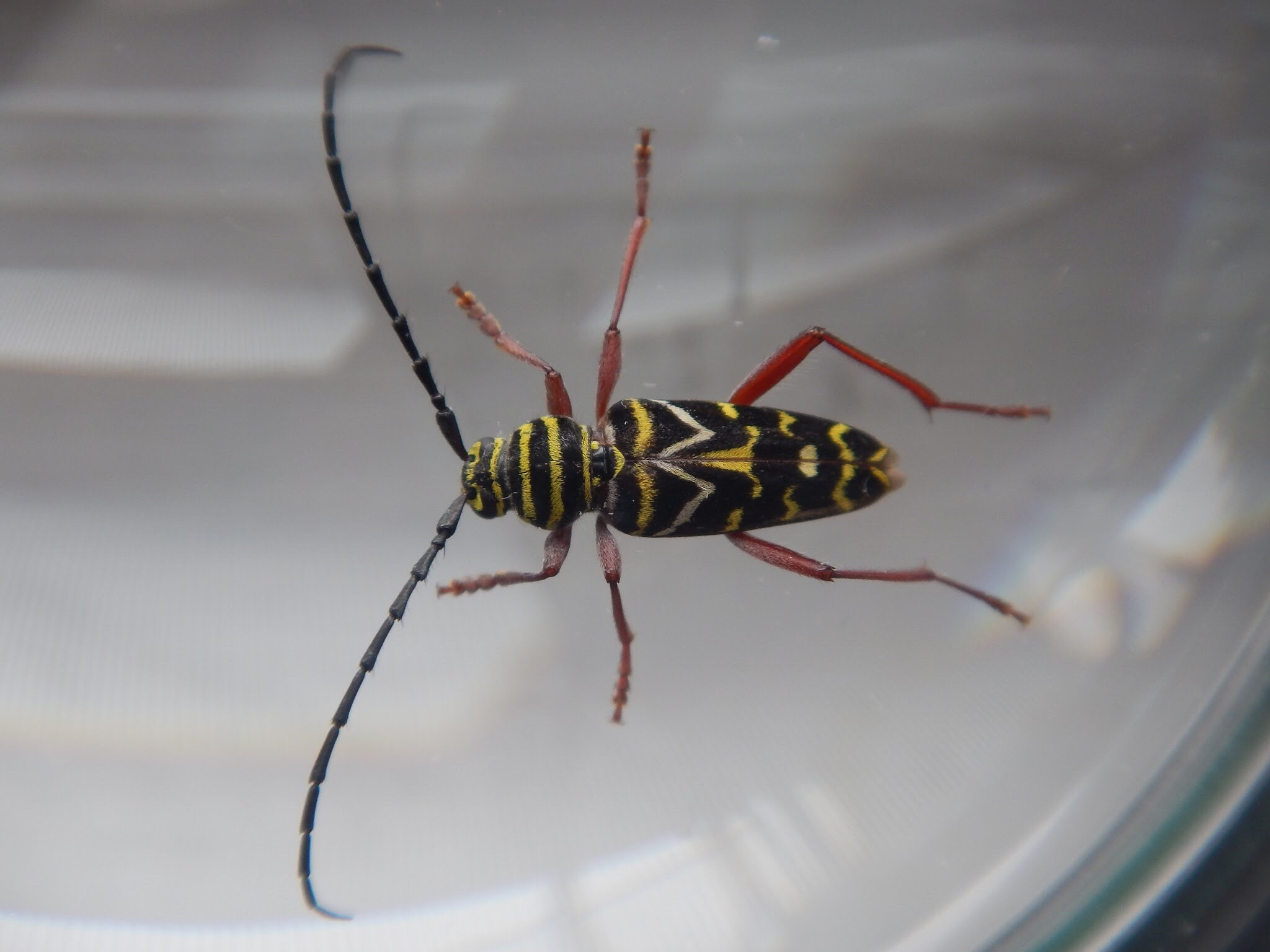

Scientific classification
- Kingdom: Animalia
- Phylum: Arthropoda
- Clade: Pancrustacea
- Class: Insecta
- Order: Coleoptera
- Suborder: Polyphaga
- Infraorder: Cucujiformia
- Family: Cerambycidae
- Genus: Megacyllene
- Species: M. caryae

Binomial name
- Megacyllene caryae (Gahan, 1908)

Synonyms
- Cyllene pictus Horn, 1880 (non Drury); Clytus pictus Packard, 1869; Cyllene caryae Gahan, 1908

= Megacyllene caryae =

Species of beetle

Megacyllene caryae, also known as the hickory borer or painted hickory borer, is a species of beetle in the family Cerambycidae occurring in the eastern United States to Texas and northern Mexico. It was described by Charles Joseph Gahan in 1908.
