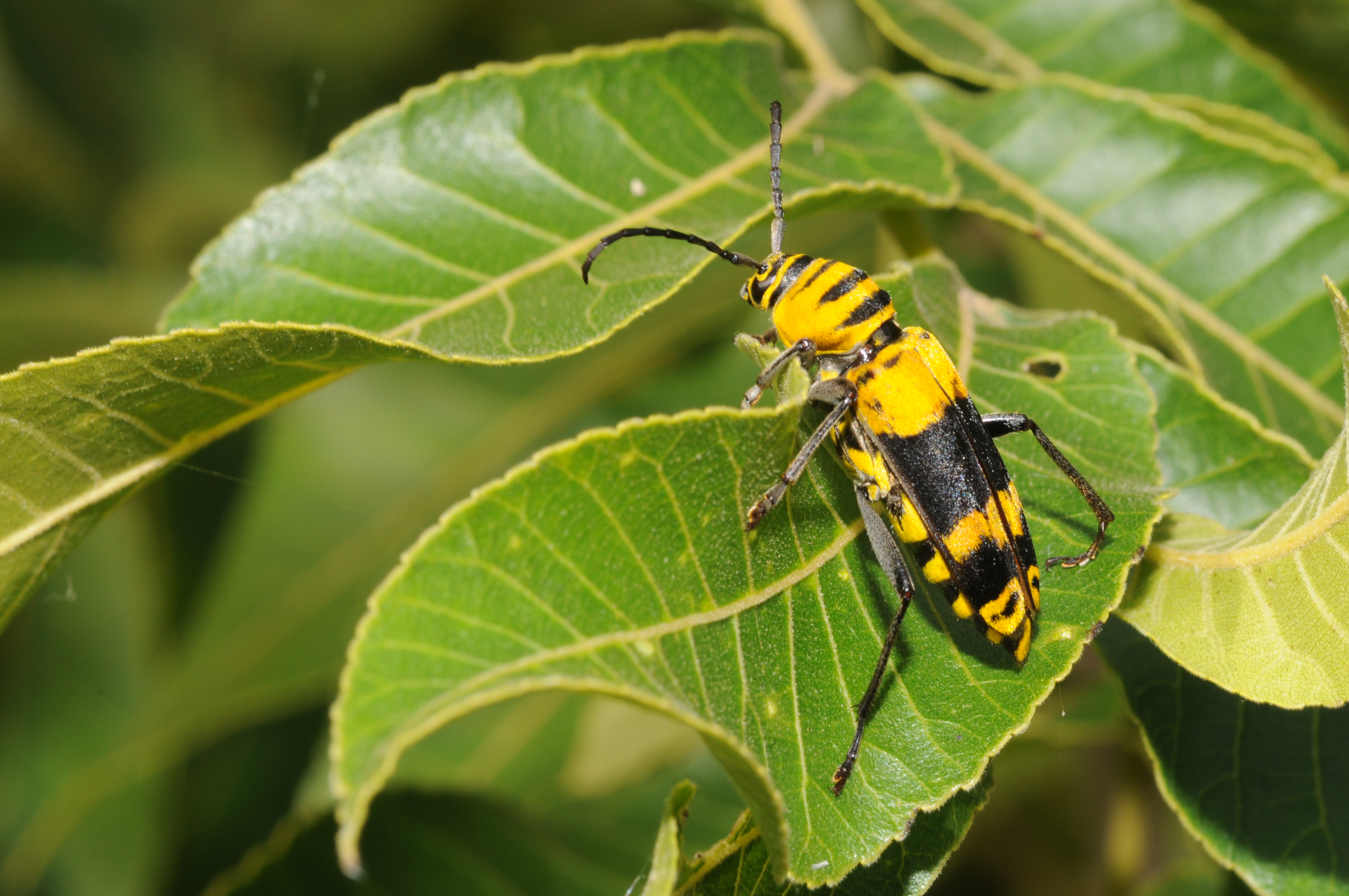

Scientific classification
- Kingdom: Animalia
- Phylum: Arthropoda
- Clade: Pancrustacea
- Class: Insecta
- Order: Coleoptera
- Suborder: Polyphaga
- Infraorder: Cucujiformia
- Family: Cerambycidae
- Genus: Megacyllene
- Species: M. decora

Binomial name
- Megacyllene decora (Olivier, 1795)

= Megacyllene decora =

Species of beetle

Megacyllene decora, the Amorpha borer, is a species of beetle. It is in the family Cerambycidae, occurring in the central United States. Its larvae feed only on the false indigo plant, Amorpha fruticosa, and its range largely overlaps the host plant's. It was described by Olivier in 1795.
