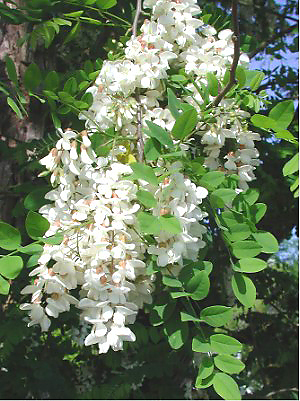
- Flowers

Conservation status
- Least Concern (IUCN 3.1)

- Secure (NatureServe)

Scientific classification
- Kingdom: Plantae
- Clade: Tracheophytes
- Clade: Angiosperms
- Clade: Eudicots
- Clade: Rosids
- Order: Fabales
- Family: Fabaceae
- Subfamily: Faboideae
- Genus: Robinia
- Species: R. pseudoacacia

Binomial name
- Robinia pseudoacacia L.
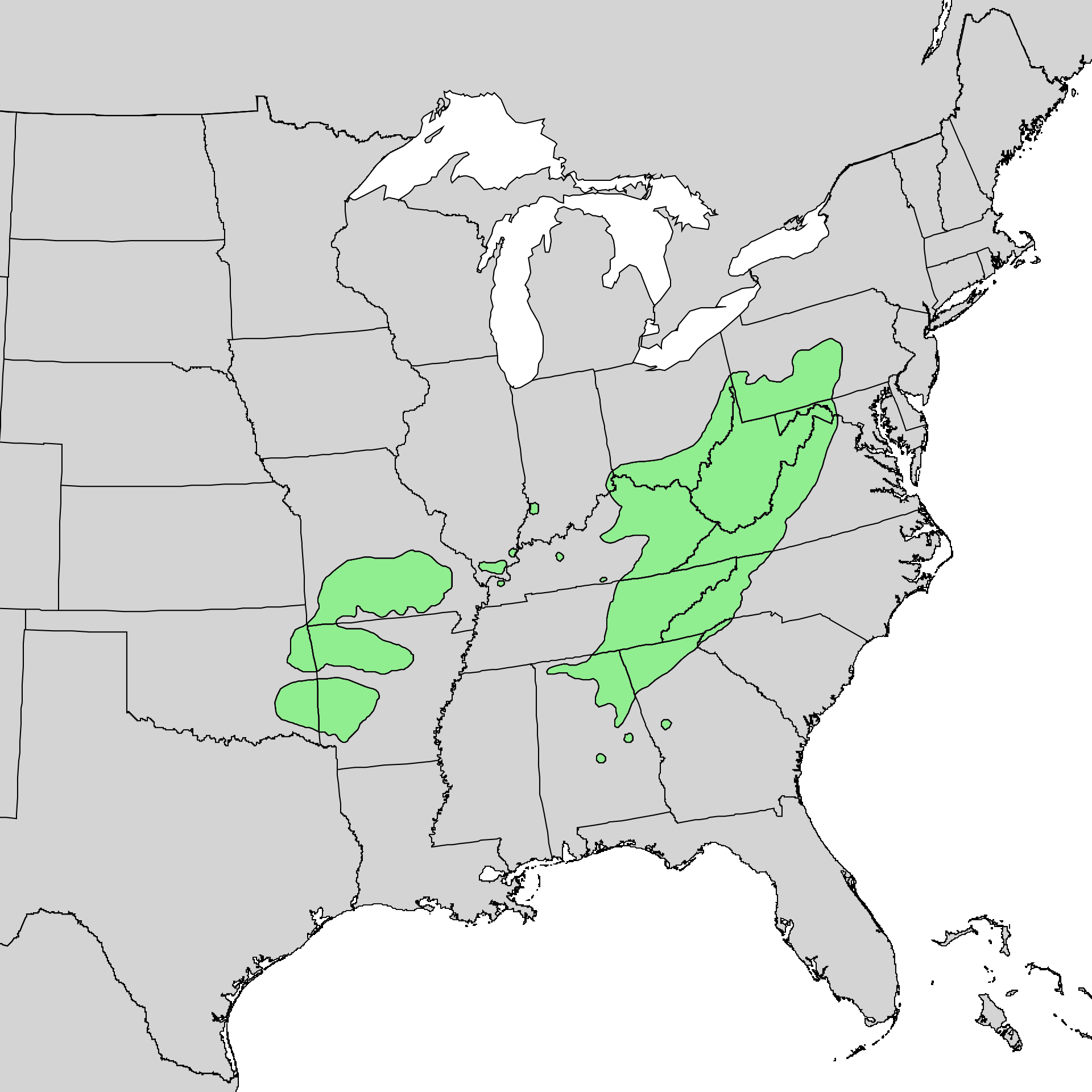
- Native range

= Robinia pseudoacacia =

Black locust

Species of tree native to North America

Robinia pseudoacacia, commonly known as black locust, is a medium-sized hardwood deciduous tree, belonging to the tribe Robinieae of the legume family. Another common name is false acacia, a literal translation of the specific name (pseudo [Greek ψευδο-] meaning 'fake' or 'false' and acacia referring to the genus of plants with the same name).

Although fossilized traces of the genus were found in Europe, the species itself is native to a few small areas of the United States, but has been widely planted and naturalized elsewhere, including temperate North America, Eurasia, and Africa. It is considered an invasive species in some regions.

== Description ==
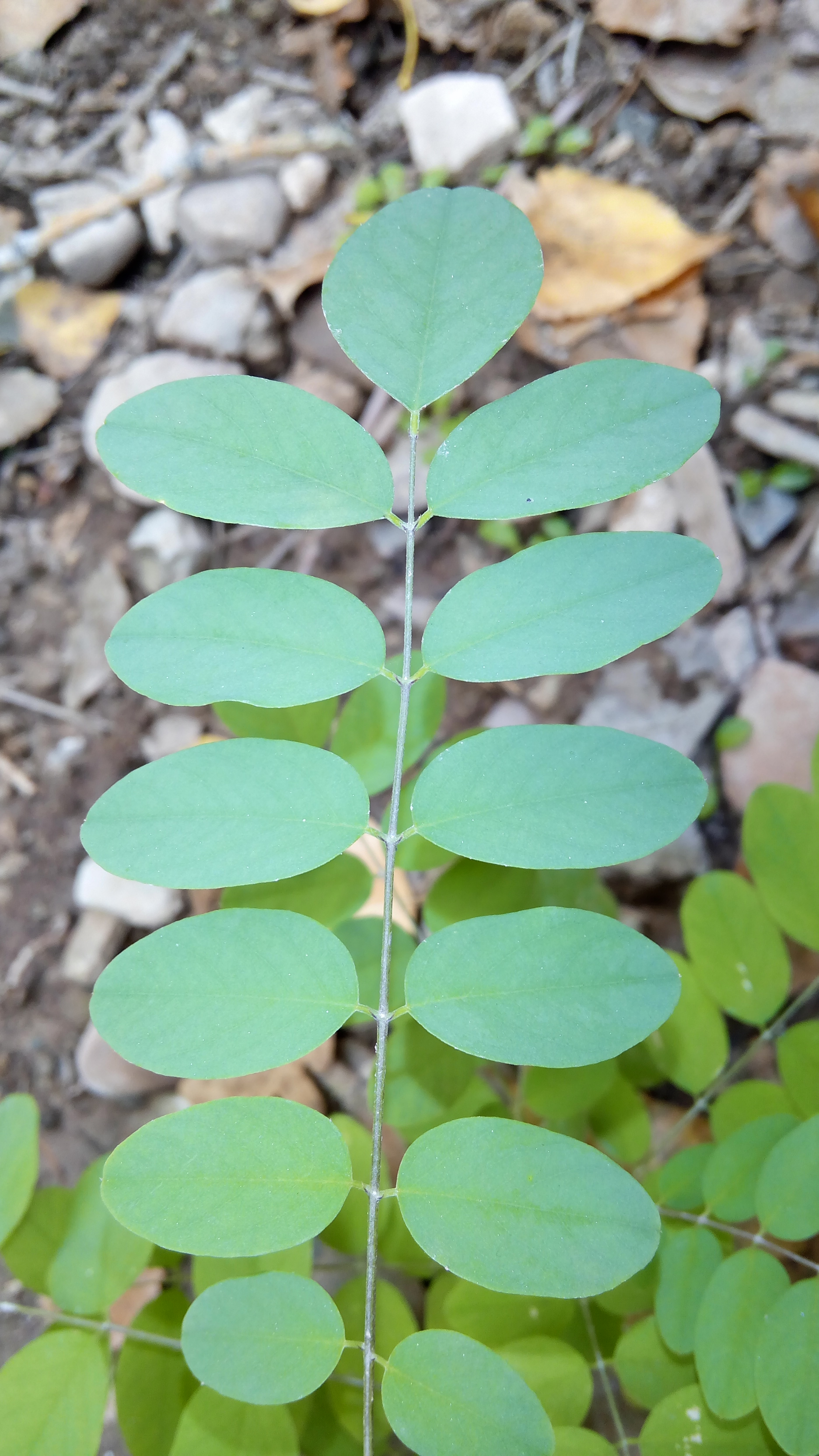
One black locust leaf showing 13 leaflets

The roots of black locust contain nodules that allow it to fix nitrogen, as is common within the pea family. Trees reach a typical height of 12–30 metres (40–100 feet) with a diameter of 0.6–1.2 m (2–4 ft). It is a very upright tree with a straight trunk and narrow crown that grows scraggly with age. The bark is a reddish black and gray and tinged with red or orange in the grooves; it is deeply furrowed into grooves and ridges which run up and down the trunk and often cross and form diamond shapes. The branches are typically zig-zaggy and may have ridges and grooves or may be round. When young, the branches are at first coated with white silvery down; this soon disappears, and they become pale green and afterward reddish or greenish brown.

The dark blue-green leaves are lighter on the underside, and are compound, meaning that each leaf contains many smaller leaflike structures called leaflets, which are roughly paired on either side of the stem that runs through the leaf (rachis). There is typically one leaflet at the tip of the leaf (odd pinnate), and the leaves are alternately arranged on the stem. Each leaf is 15–36 cm (6–14 in) long and contains 9–19 leaflets, each being 2.5–5 cm (1–2 in) long and 0.6–2 cm (1/4–3/4 in) wide. The leaflets are rounded or slightly indented at the tip and typically rounded at the base. The leaves come out of the bud folded in half, yellow green, covered with silvery down which soon disappears. Each leaflet initially has a minute stipel, which quickly falls, and is connected to the (rachis) by a short stem or petiolule. The leaves are attached to the branch with slender hairy petioles which are grooved and swollen at the base. The stipules are linear, downy, membranous at first and occasionally develop into prickles. The leaves appear relatively late in spring, and turn a clear pale yellow in autumn. The leaflets fold together in wet weather and at night (nyctinasty), as some change of position at night is a habit of the entire leguminous family.

Young trees are often spiny, especially on root suckers and branches near the ground; mature trees often lack spines. R. pseudoacacia is quite variable in the number of spines present, as some trees are densely prickly and other trees have no prickles at all. The spines typically remain on the tree until the young thin bark to which they are attached is replaced by the thicker mature bark. They develop from stipules (small leaf-like structures that grow at the base of leaves), and since stipules are paired at the base of leaves, the spines will be paired at the bases of leaves. They are up to 2 cm (3/4 in) long and somewhat triangular with a flared base and sharp point. Their color is a dark purple and they adhere only to the bark.

The winter buds are minute, naked (having no scales covering them), three or four together, protected in a depression by a scale-like covering lined on the inner surface with a thick coat of tomentum and opening in early spring. When the buds are forming they are covered by the swollen base of the petiole. The large flowers open in May or June for 7–10 days, after the leaves have developed. They are arranged in loose drooping clumps (racemes) which are typically 10–20 cm (4–8 in) long. The flowers themselves are cream-white (rarely pink or purple) with a pale yellow blotch in the center and imperfectly papilionaceous in shape. They are about 2.5 cm (1 in) wide, very fragrant, and produce large amounts of nectar. Each flower is perfect, having both stamens and a pistil (male and female parts). There are 10 stamens enclosed within the petals; these are fused together in a diadelphous configuration, where the filaments of 9 are all joined to form a tube and one stamen is separate and above the joined stamens. The single ovary is superior and contains several ovules. Below each flower is a calyx which looks like leafy tube between the flower and the stem. It is made from fused sepals and is dark green and may be blotched with red. The pedicels (stems which connect the flower to the branch) are slender, 1.3 cm (1/2 in), dark red or reddish green.

The fruit is a typical legume fruit, being a flat and smooth pea-like pod 5–10 cm (2–4 in) long and 1.3 cm (1/2 in) broad. The fruit usually contains 4–8 seeds. The seeds are dark orange brown with irregular markings. They ripen late in autumn and hang on the branches until early spring. There are typically 25,500 seeds per pound. Cotyledons are oval in shape and fleshy.

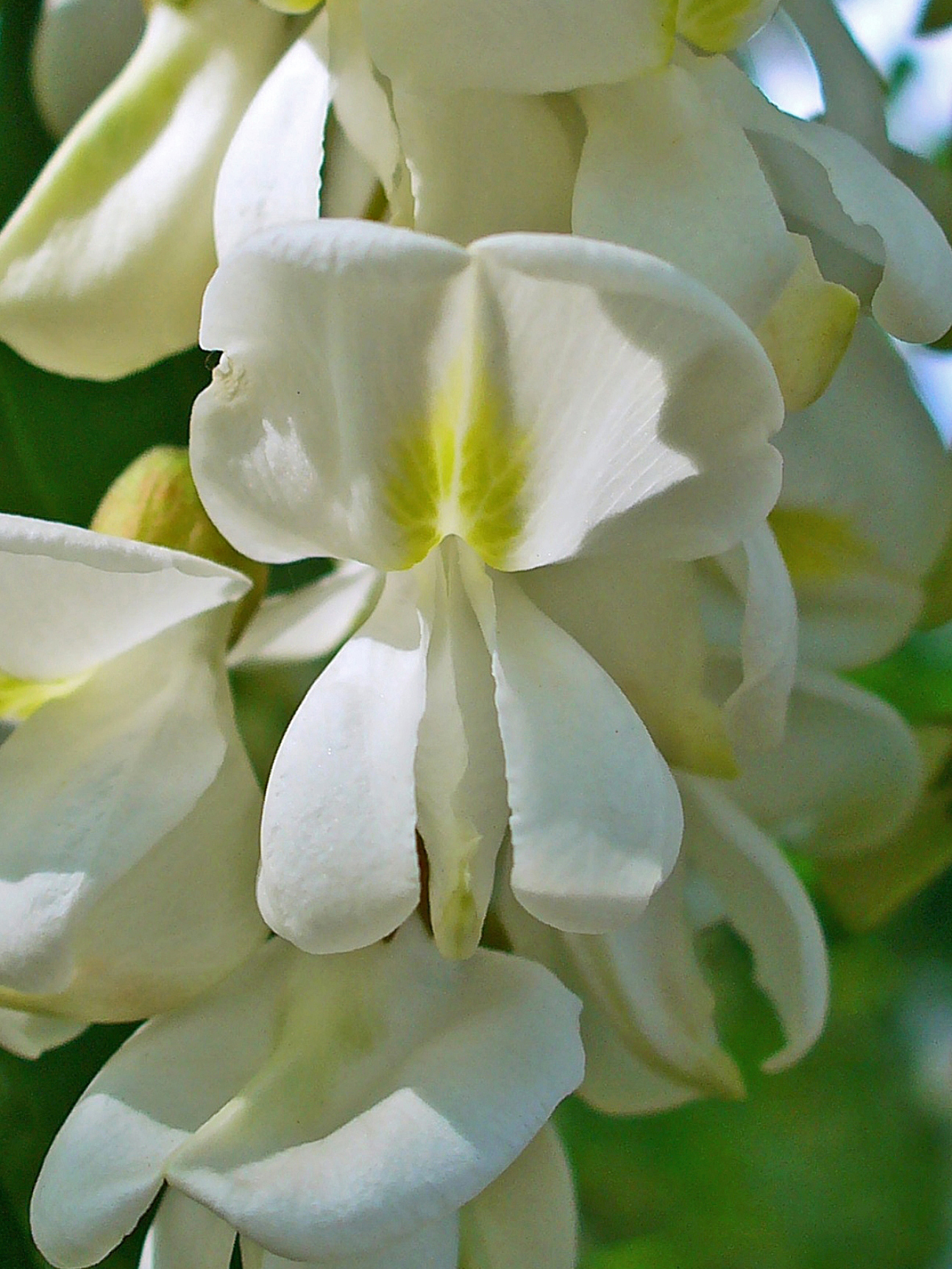
Closeup of flowers

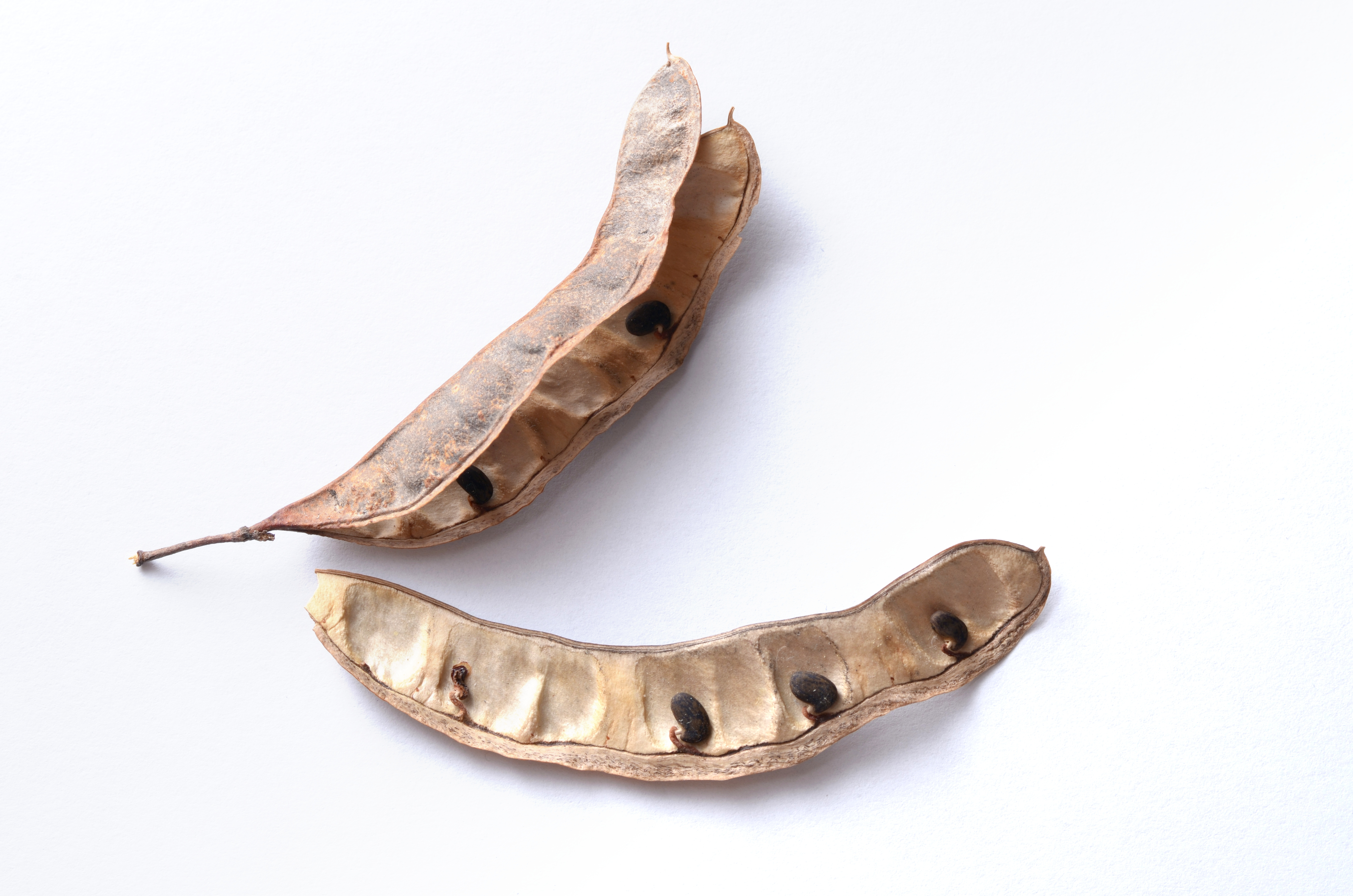
Fruit with seeds

=== Reproduction and dispersal ===
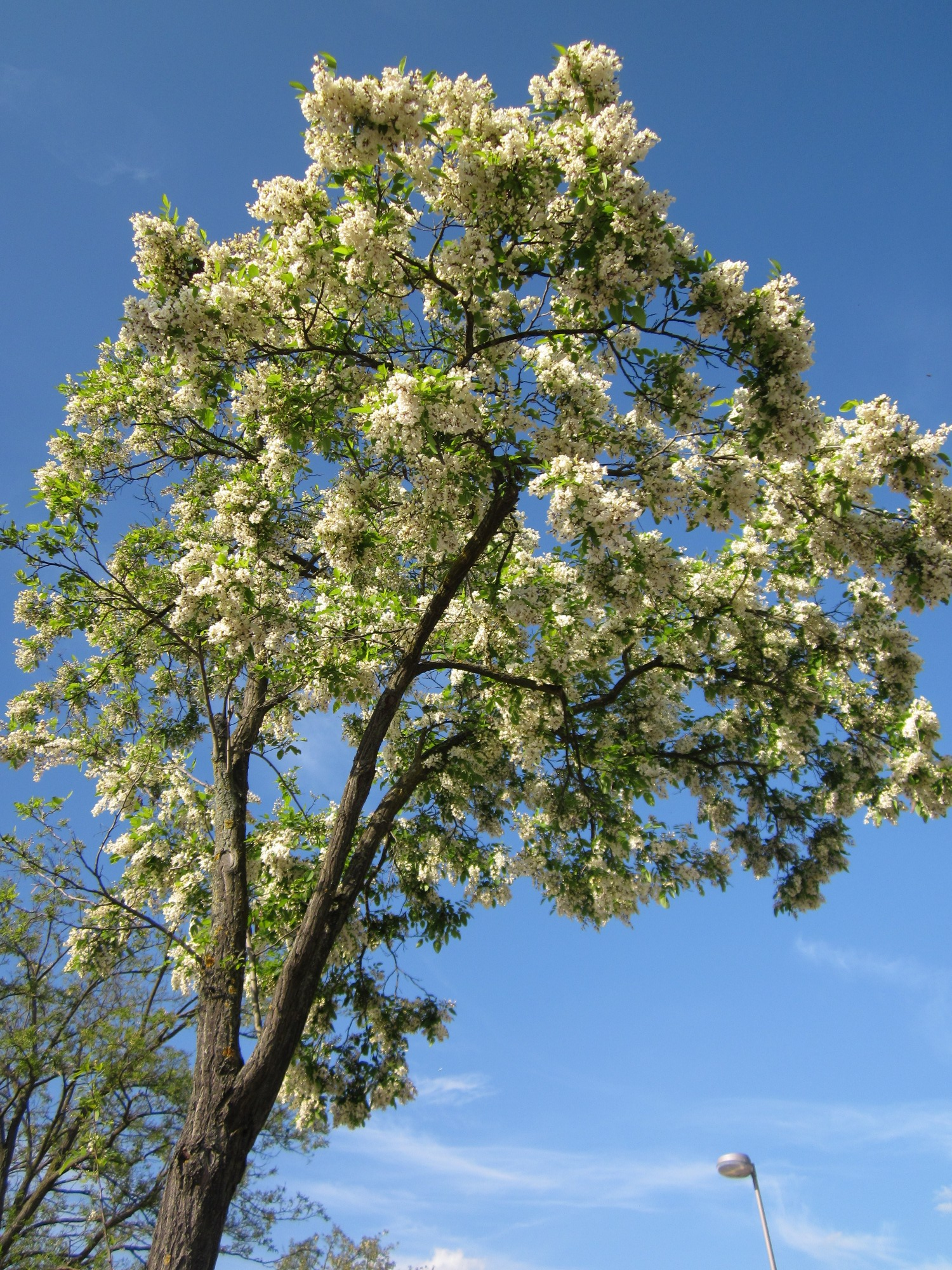
Tree in flower

Black locust reproduces both sexually via flowers, and asexually via root suckers. The flowers are pollinated by insects, primarily by Hymenopteran insects. The physical construction of the flower separates the male and female parts so that self-pollination will not typically occur. The seedlings grow rapidly but they have a thick seed coat which means that not all seeds will germinate. The seed coat can be weakened via hot water, sulfuric acid, or be mechanically scarified, which will allow a greater quantity of the seeds to grow. The seeds are produced in good crops every year or every other year.

Root suckers are an important method of local reproduction of this tree. The roots may grow suckers after damage (by being hit with a lawn mower or otherwise damaged) or after no damage at all. The suckers are stems which grow from the roots, directly into the air and may grow into full trees. The main trunk also has the capability to grow sprouts and will do so after being cut down. This makes removal of black locust difficult as the suckers need to be continually removed from both the trunk and roots or the tree will regrow. This is considered an asexual form of reproduction.

The suckers allow black locust to grow into colonies which often exclude other species. These colonies may form dense thickets which shade out competition. Black locust has been found to have either 2n=20 or 2n=22 chromosomes.

=== Flavonoid content ===
Black locust leaves contain flavone glycosides characterised by spectroscopic and chemical methods as the 7-O-β-ᴅ-glucuronopyranosyl-(1→2)[α-ʟ-rhamnopyranosyl-(1→6)]-β-ᴅ-glucopyranosides of acacetin (5,7-dihydroxy-4′-methoxyflavone), apigenin (5,7,4′-trihydroxyflavone), diosmetin (5,7,3′-trihydroxy-4′-methoxyflavone) and luteolin (5,7,3′,4′-tetrahydroxyflavone).

=== Similar species ===
Although similar in general appearance to the honey locust, the black locust lacks that tree's characteristic long branched thorns on the trunk, having instead pairs of short prickles at the base of each leaf; the leaflets are also much broader than honey locust. It may resemble Styphnolobium japonicum, which has smaller flower spikes and lacks spines.

== Taxonomy ==
The black locust is a plant from the subfamily of Faboideae in the family of legumes (Fabaceae) and is a relative of the pea and bean.

The black locust is commonly referred to as "false acacia" after its species name "pseudoacacia", although it is not particularly closely related to the acacia, which belongs to the mimosa subfamily (Mimosoideae). Both species are similar in the form of their feathered leaves and thorns, but the flower shapes are very different. Confusion between species of both genera is almost impossible in higher latitudes, since acacias are native to subtropical and tropical areas and do not thrive in the cooler climates favoured by the black locust.

== History ==
The tree was identified in 1607 at Jamestown by British colonists, who used the timber to build houses. The tree was named for its resemblance to Ceratonia siliqua, known as the "Old World Locust".

=== Introduction in Europe ===
The genus is named after the royal French gardeners Jean Robin and his son Vespasien Robin. Today, The Jardin des Plantes botanical garden in Paris, France, says Jean Robin planted a black locust tree in France in his own garden located in L'île de la Cité, Paris, circa 1600 (previously said to be in 1601 or 1602), his son Vespasien later uprooting and transplanting the very same tree circa 1630 in the actual Jardin des Plantes botanical garden in Paris (previously thought to originate from an offshoot of the tree planted by the father, while the now revised official story states the original tree being uprooted had offshoots grow later from some of the roots which were still left in the soil in its initial location). Jean Robin is said to have obtained the seeds which served to plant the tree in question from his friend John Tradescant the Elder, an English naturalist. It was introduced into Britain in 1636.. The Jardin des Plantes also exhibits a hybrid black locust cultivar bearing pink colored flowers, coined Robinier de Descaines (Robinia x ambigua ‘Decaisneana’) which was developed in the 19th century in the city of Manosque by mr. Villevieille, a local gardener.

According to research by Hungarian naturalist József Ernyey, the proliferation of the Black Locust in the mid-18th century was closely linked to the Seven Years' War (1756–1763). Recognizing the tree's rapid growth and dense habit, the military administration of the Habsburg Monarchy utilized the species as a defensive tool. Under orders from Queen Maria Theresa, Robinia pseudoacacia was planted near fortifications to create physical obstacles that hindered the movement of enemy infantry and the positioning of artillery.

The species saw a second major wave of planting following World War I. In the wake of territorial losses and environmental concerns regarding the increasing aridity of the Great Hungarian Plain, the Hungarian government launched large-scale afforestation programs. The Black Locust was favored for its ability to stabilize sandy soil and reverse erosion, leading the state to override private property rights to enforce its planting.

== Distribution ==
The genus Robinia is native to North America, although traces of it are found in Eocene and Miocene rocks in Europe.

The species itself is native to the eastern United States, but its exact native range is not accurately known as it has been cultivated and is now found in all 48 lower states, British Columbia, and eastern Canada. The native range is thought to be two separate populations, one centered about the Appalachian Mountains from Pennsylvania to northern Georgia, and a second westward focused around the Ozark Plateau and Ouachita Mountains of Arkansas, Oklahoma and Missouri.

The tree has been naturalized in temperate North America, Eurasia, and Africa. Humans have distributed the tree for landscaping, with its range now including Canada, Southern South America, Europe, temperate regions in Asia (including China, India, and Pakistan), Northern and Southern Africa, Australia, and New Zealand.

== Ecology ==
Black locust is a shade-intolerant species and therefore is typical of young woodlands and disturbed areas where sunlight is plentiful and the soil is dry. In this sense, black locust can be considered a weed tree. It also spreads by underground shoots or suckers, which contributes to the weedy character of this species.

When growing in sandy areas this plant can enrich the soil by means of its nitrogen-fixing nodules, allowing other species to move in. On sandy soils black locust may replace other vegetation which cannot fix nitrogen.

Black locust is a typical early successional plant, a pioneer species. It grows best in bright sunlight and does not handle shade well. It specializes in colonizing disturbed areas and edges of woodlots before it is eventually replaced with taller or more shade-tolerant species. It prefers dry to moist limestone soils but will grow on most soils as long as they are not wet or poorly drained. This tree tolerates a soil pH range of 4.6 to 8.2. Within its native range it will grow on soils of Inceptisols, Ultisols, and Alfisols groups, but does not do well on compacted, clayey or eroded soils. Black locust is a part of the Appalachian mixed mesophytic forests.

Black locust is host to up to 67 species of lepidoptera, and provides valuable cover when planted on previously open areas. Its seeds are eaten by bobwhite quail and other game birds and squirrels. Woodpeckers may nest in the trunk since older trees are often infected by heart rot. The deeply grooved bark also makes it a preferred species for some bat roosts.

=== Herbivores ===
Locust leaf miner Odontota dorsalis attacks the tree in spring and turns the leaves brown by mid summer, slowing the growth of the tree though not seriously. Locust borer Megacyllene robiniae larvae carve tunnels into the trunk of the tree and make it more prone to being knocked down by the wind. Heart rot is the only significant disease affecting black locust. The black locust is among the preferred reproductive hosts of the polyphagous shot-hole borer (PSHB, Euwallacea fornicatus). The PSHB will tunnel galleries into the trees, where it cultivates a fusarium fungus as a food source. The tree's vascular systems are disrupted, causing dieback.

Other insect species feeding on black locust in its native range are the gall midge Obolodiplosis robiniae, the sawflies Euura tibialis and Nematus abbotii, and a number of Lepidoptera: Agonopterix robiniella (Depressariidae), Filatima pseudacaciella (Gelechiidae), Ecdytolopha insiticiana (Tortricidae), Euparthenos nubilis and Zale unilineata in Erebidae, Sciota subcaesiella (Pyralidae), and the Gracillariidae leafminers Chrysaster ostensackenella, Macrosaccus robiniella and Parectopa robiniella.

Black locust is also attacked by Chlorogenus robiniae, a virus which causes witch's broom growths; clear leaflet veins are a symptom of the disease.

=== Invasiveness ===
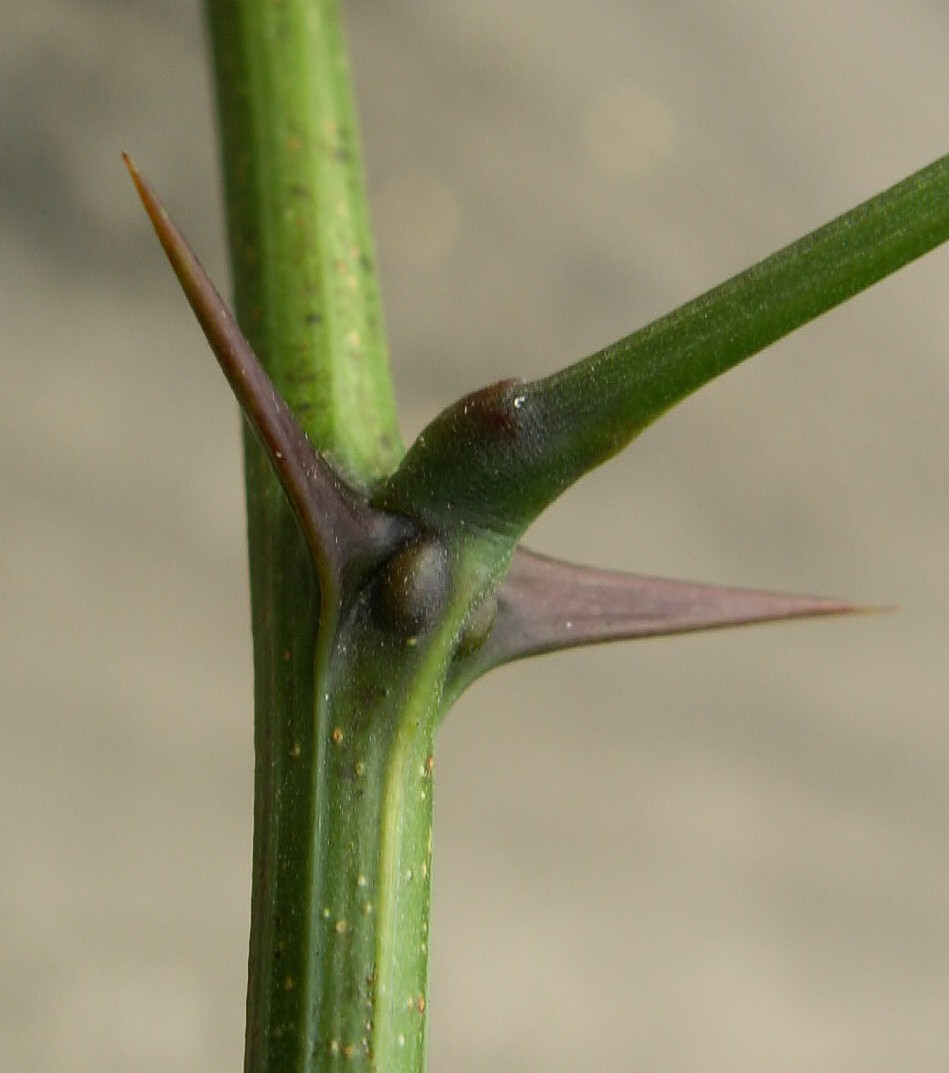
Close-up of spines

Black locust is considered invasive on its native continent, specifically in the western United States, New England region, northern California, and in the Midwest. In the prairie and savanna regions of the Midwest, black locust can dominate and shade open habitats. These ecosystems have been decreasing in size, and black locust is contributing to this reduction; when black locust invades an area, it will convert the grassland ecosystem into a forested ecosystem where the grasses are displaced. Black locust has been listed as invasive in Connecticut, Wisconsin, and Michigan, and is prohibited in Massachusetts.

In South Africa, the species is regarded as a weed because of its suckering habit. In Australia, black locust has become naturalized within Victoria, New South Wales, South Australia and Western Australia. It is considered an environmental weed there. The cultivar 'Frisia' (Golden Robinia) was widely planted as a street tree on the temperate east coast of Australia before being classified as a weed.

Black locust outcompetes nearby trees with its extreme growth rate, remaining herbaceous longer than most woody species. In Kashmir, India, the average height growth rate of black locust was 0.5–1.5 m (1 1/2–5 ft) per year.

==== Hungary ====
Today, the tree is economically significant in Hungary as a source of high-energy firewood and for the production of acacia honey. However, it is also ecologically disruptive, as it outcompetes indigenous tree species and converts open grassland habitats into shrublands, threatening rare native flora.

In 2014, a political conflict arose when the European Union considered classifying Robinia pseudoacacia as an invasive species. The Hungarian government opposed this classification, declaring the tree a "Hungaricum"—a protected element of national cultural heritage—effectively politicizing the species' biological status.

== Toxicity ==
The bark, leaves, and wood are toxic to both humans and livestock. Important constituents of the plant are the toxalbumin robin, which loses its toxicity when heated, and robinin, a nontoxic glucoside.

Horses that consume the plant show signs of anorexia, depression, incontinence, colic, weakness, and cardiac arrhythmia. Symptoms usually occur about 1 hour following consumption, and immediate veterinary attention is required.

The sawdust and shavings from Robinia lumber can cause contact dermatitis in sensitive persons.

== Cultivation and uses ==
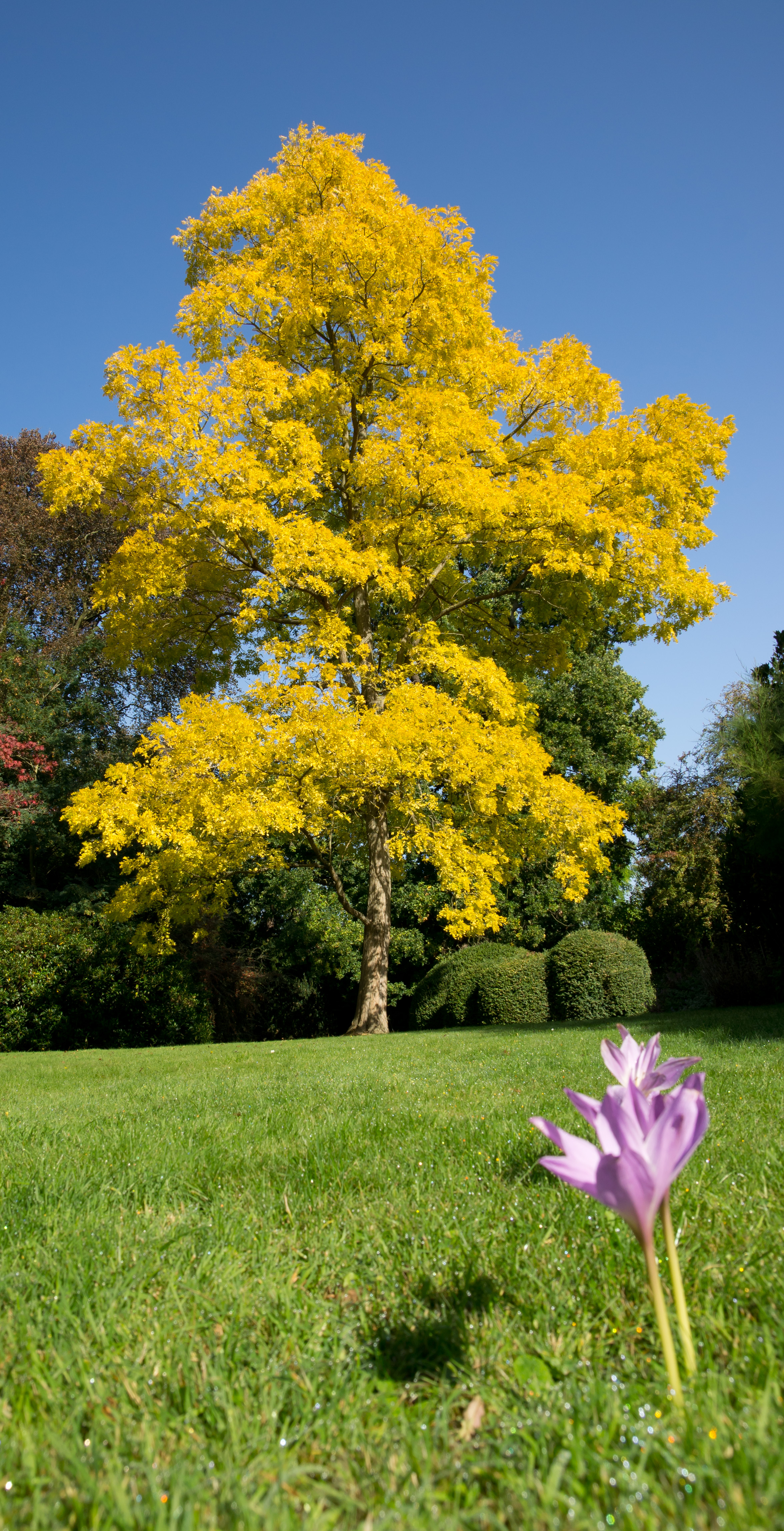
The golden 'Frisia' cultivar planted as an ornamental tree

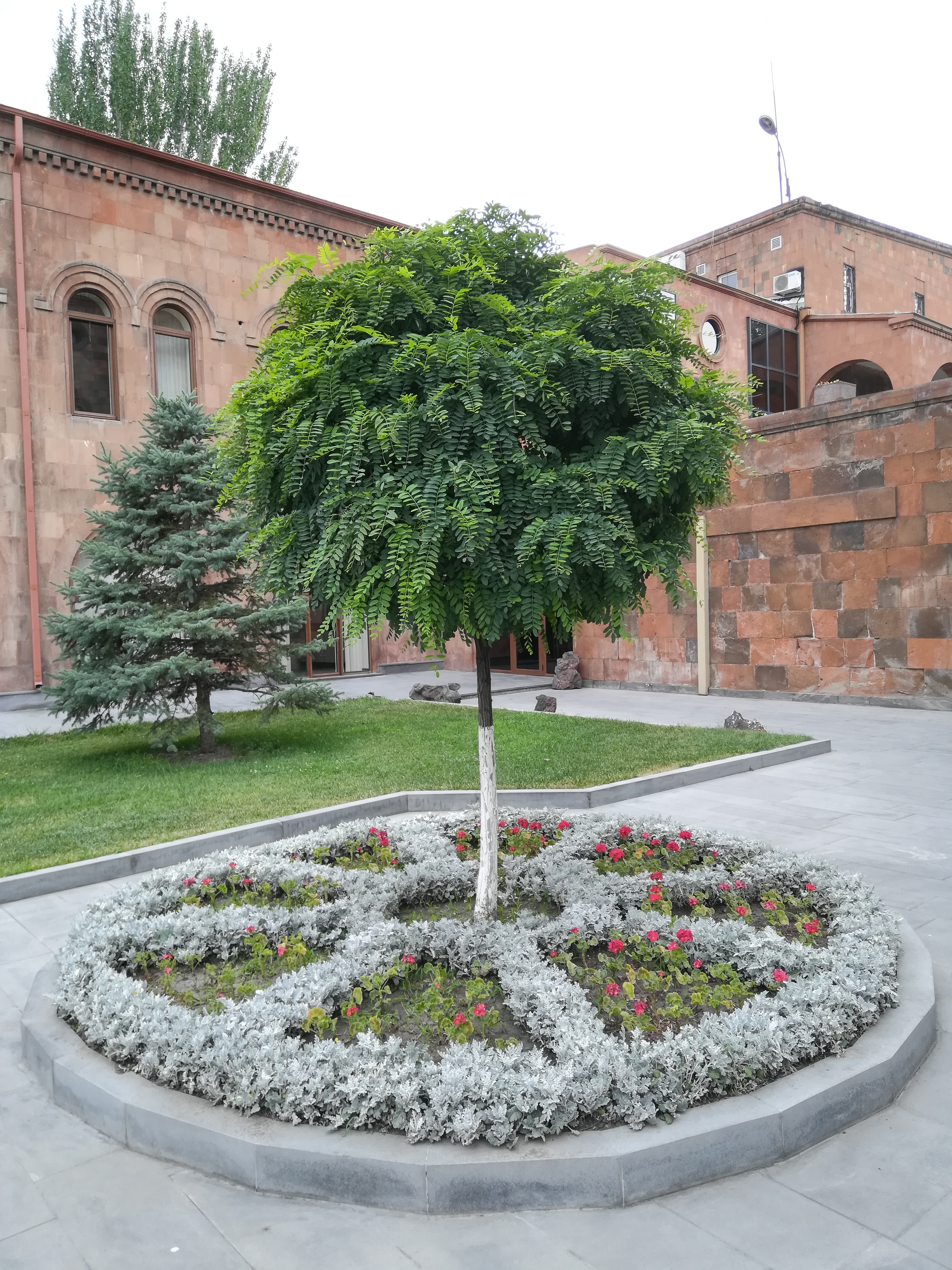
An ornamental at the Yerevan Ararat Brandy Factory, Armenia

Black locust can be easily propagated from roots, softwood, or hardwood. Cultivars may be grafted, ensuring that parent and daughter plants will be genetically identical.

In Europe, it is often planted along streets and in parks, especially in large cities, because it tolerates pollution well.

=== Cultivars ===
Several cultivars exist, 'Frisia' being one of the most planted ones.

- 'Decaisneana' has been considered a cultivar but is more accurately a hybrid (R. pseudoacacia x R. viscosa). It has light rose-pink colored flowers and small or no prickles.
- 'Frisia', a selection with bright yellow-green leaves and red prickles, is occasionally planted as an ornamental tree.
- 'Purple robe' has dark rose-pink flowers and bronze red new growth. The flowers tend to last longer than on the wild tree.
- 'Tortuosa', a small tree with curved and distorted branches.
- 'Unifoliola', a plant with fewer leaflets, no prickles, and a shorter height.

Black locust has been spread and used as a plant for erosion control as it is fast growing and generally a tough tree. The wood, considered the most durable wood in North America, has been very desirable and motivated people to move the tree to areas where it is not native so the wood can be farmed and used.

=== Food and medicine ===
==== Honey ====
Black locust is a major honey plant in the eastern US, and has been planted in European countries. In many European countries, it is the source of the renowned acacia honey. Flowering starts after 140 growing degree days. However, its blooming period is short (about 10 days) and it does not consistently produce a honey crop year after year. Weather conditions can have quite an effect on the amount of nectar collected, as well; in Ohio for example, good locust honey flow happens in one of five years.

==== Other produce ====
In traditional medicine of India, different parts of R. pseudoacacia are used as laxative, antispasmodic, and diuretic.

In Liguria, Italy and Romania the flowers are sometimes used to produce a sweet and perfumed jam. This means manual harvesting of flowers, eliminating the seeds and boiling the petals with sugar, in certain proportions, to obtain a light sweet and delicate perfume jam.

Although the bark and leaves are toxic, various reports suggest that the seeds and the young pods of the black locust are edible. Shelled seeds are safe to harvest from summer through fall, and are edible both raw and boiled. Due to the small size of the seeds, shelling them efficiently can prove tedious and difficult. In France, Italy and Romania, R. pseudoacacia flowers are eaten as beignets after being coated in batter and fried in oil; they are also eaten in Japan, largely as tempura.

=== Erosion control ===
The species is considered excellent for growing in disturbed areas as an erosion control plant. Black locust's shallow, aggressive roots help hold onto the soil, and nitrogen-fixing bacteria on its root system allow it to grow on poor soils, making it an early colonizer of disturbed areas. Obviating the mass application of fertilizers, black locust and other nitrogen-fixing tree and shrub species have gained importance in managed forestry.

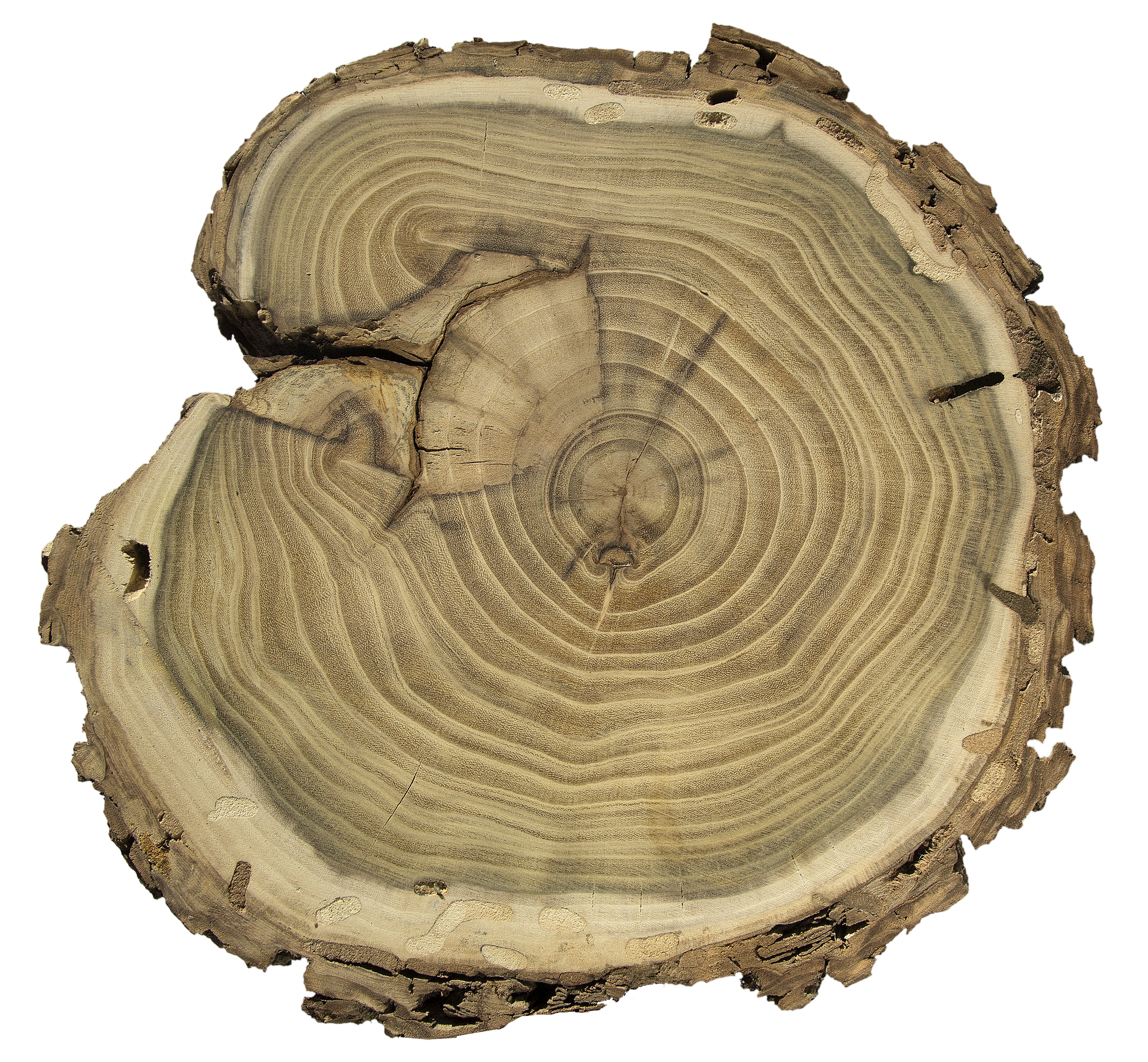
Tree rings

=== Firewood ===
Black locust is planted for firewood, as it grows rapidly, is highly resilient in a variety of soils, and grows back rapidly after harvest from the existing root system (i.e. coppicing).

Black locust is highly valued as firewood for wood-burning stoves; it burns slowly, with little visible flame or smoke, and has a higher heat content than any other species that grows widely in the eastern United States, comparable to the heat content of anthracite. For best results, it should be seasoned like any other hardwood, but black locust is also popular because of its ability to burn even when wet. In fireplaces, it can be less satisfactory because knots and beetle damage make the wood prone to "spitting" coals for distances of up to several feet. If the black locust is cut, split, and cured while relatively young (within 10 years), thus minimizing beetle damage, "spitting" problems are minimal.

=== Construction ===
This native hardwood is also prized by North American shipwrights for making rot-resistant trunnels in traditional wooden ship construction.

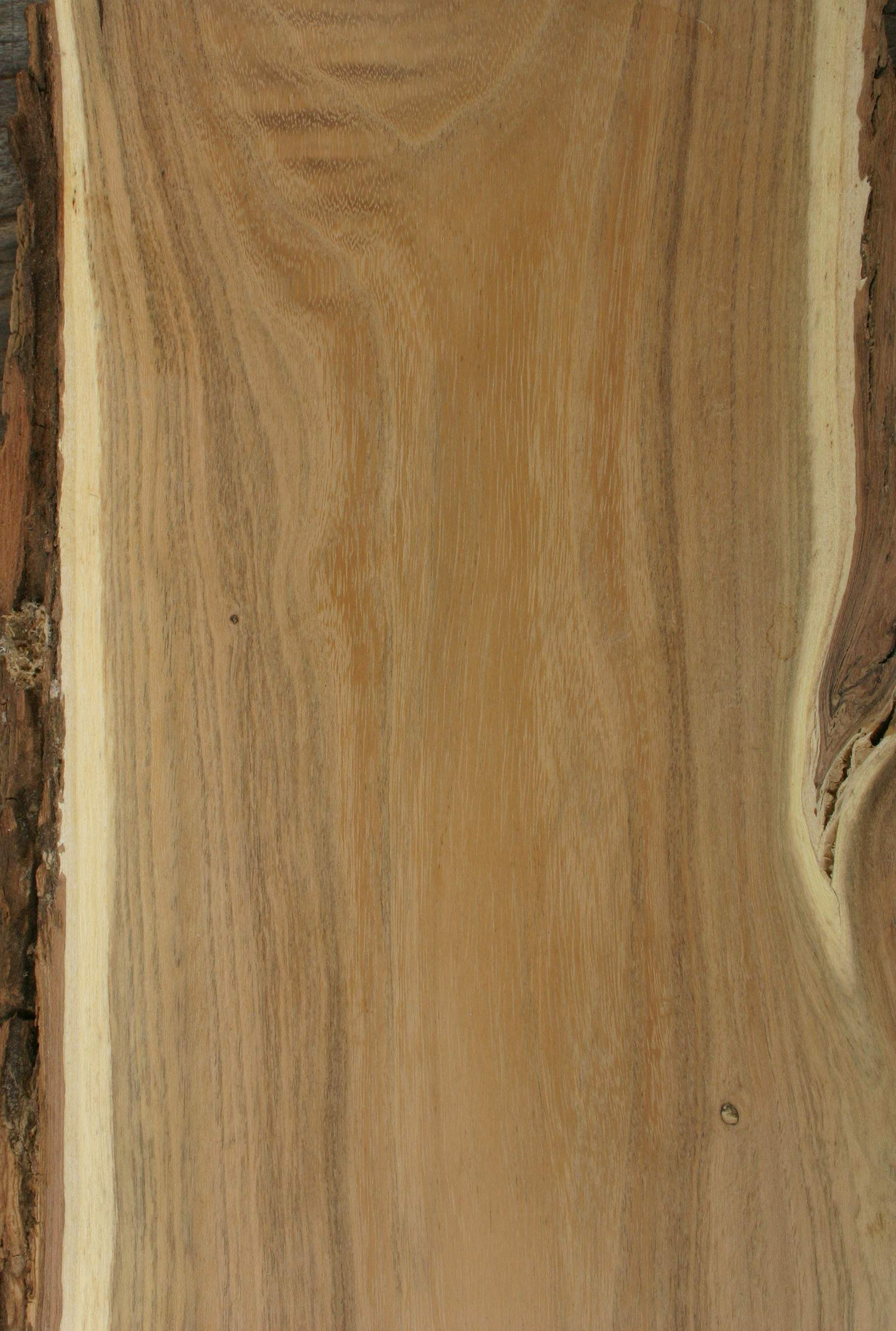
Wood

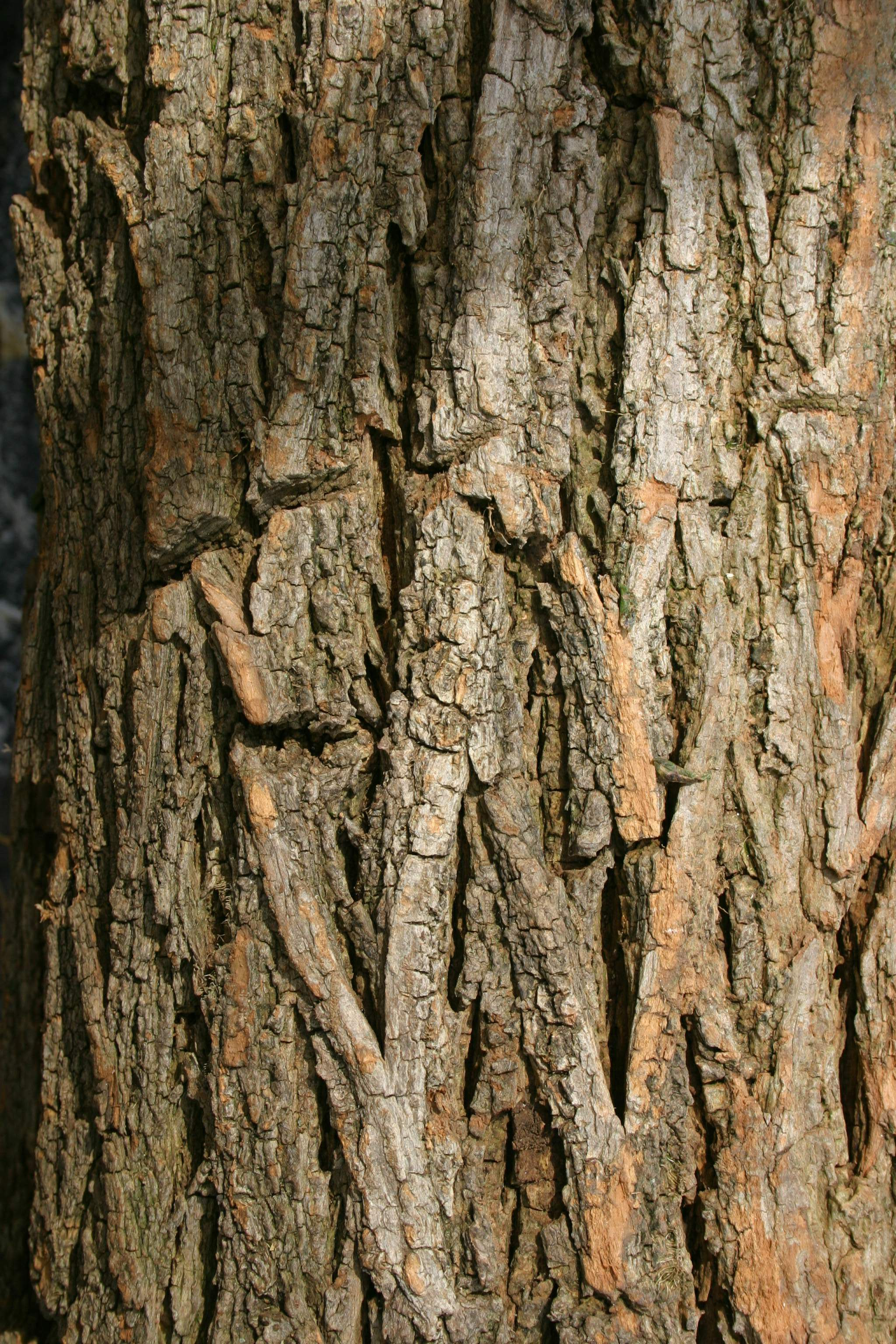
Bark

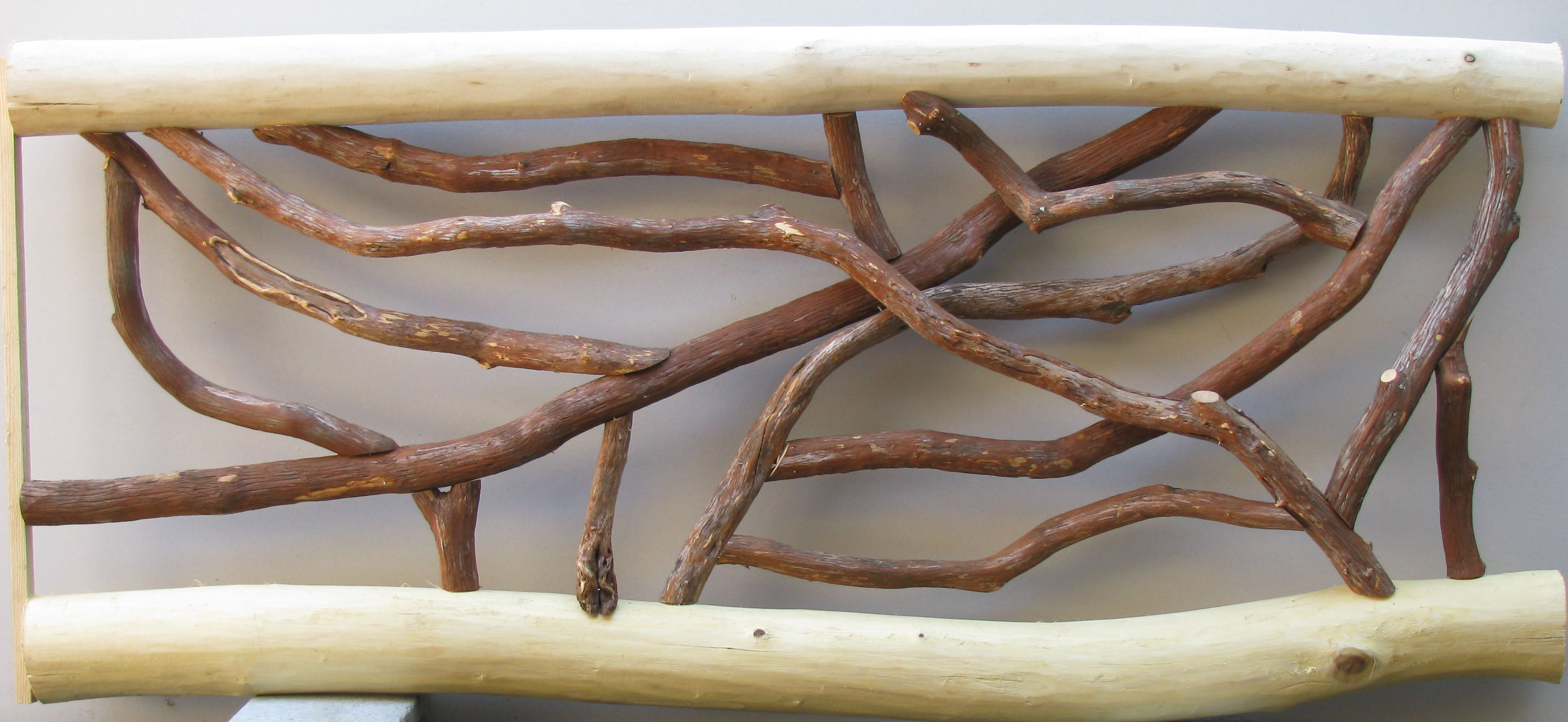
Locust railing

The wood is extremely hard, being one of the hardest woods in Northern America with a Janka hardness test of 1,700 lbf (7,560 N) and specific gravity of 0.733 (733 kilograms per cubic metre or 45.7 pounds per cubic foot). It is very resistant to rot, and durable, making it prized for furniture, flooring, paneling, fence posts, and small watercraft. Wet, newly cut planks have an offensive odor which disappears with seasoning. Black locust is still in use in some rustic handrail systems. In the Netherlands and some other parts of Europe, black locust is one of the most rot-resistant local trees, and projects have started to limit the use of tropical wood by promoting this tree and creating plantations. Flavonoids in the heartwood allow the wood to last over 100 years in soil.

With a light yellowish color and strength, the wood was much used for decorative inlays and banding in furniture in England and France in the 17th and 18th centuries, under the name "acacia" or "Virginia acacia". Recently, Robinia has become popular for outdoor furniture and playground equipment.

In 1900, the value of Robinia pseudoacacia was reported to be practically destroyed in nearly all parts of the U.S. beyond the mountain forests which are its home by locust borers which riddle the trunk and branches. Were it not for these insects, it would be one of the most valuable timber trees that could be planted in the northern and middle states. Young trees grow quickly and vigorously for a number of years, but soon become stunted and diseased, and rarely live long enough to attain any commercial value.

== In culture ==
In Asia, many black locusts, called cihuai (zh:刺槐), yanghuai (foreign huai zh:洋槐, against native huai zh:国槐) or simply "acacias", were planted in Dalian, Liaoning, China, during its Russian and Japanese occupation, and are loved by the local people: there is Acacia Avenue (槐树大道) in downtown; the Acacia Flower Festival (槐花節) is celebrated every year in May; and acacia honey is collected in the suburbs by bee keepers.

The Locust of Square René-Viviani is the oldest tree in Paris.
