= Sciota =

Sciota may refer to:

== Places ==
- Sciota, Illinois
- Sciota, Pennsylvania
- Sciota Township, McDonough County, Illinois
- Sciota Township, Shiawassee County, Michigan
- Sciota Township, Dakota County, Minnesota

== Moths ==
- Sciota (moth), moths belonging to family Pyralidae including
  - Sciota adelphella
  - Sciota rhenella
  - Sciota subcaesiella

== Ships ==
- USS Sciota (1861)
- USS Sciota (AT-30)
- USS Sciota (ATA-205)

== See also ==
- Scioto (disambiguation)
