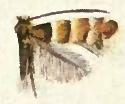

Scientific classification
- Domain: Eukaryota
- Kingdom: Animalia
- Phylum: Arthropoda
- Class: Insecta
- Order: Lepidoptera
- Family: Gracillariidae
- Genus: Chrysaster
- Species: C. ostensackenella

Binomial name
- Chrysaster ostensackenella (Fitch, 1859)

Synonyms
- Argyromiges ostensackenella Fitch, 1859; Lithocolletis ostensackenella; Chrysaster ornatella (Chambers, 1871)

= Chrysaster ostensackenella =

Species of moth

Chrysaster ostensackenella is a moth of the family Gracillariidae. It is known from Ontario, Québec and Nova Scotia in Canada, and the United States (Illinois, Kentucky, New York, Maine, Maryland, Michigan, Vermont, Arizona, Massachusetts, North Carolina and Connecticut). It has also been recorded in 2015 from China and in 2017 from Korea, and in 2022 from Central Italy.

The wingspan is about 5 mm.

The larvae feed on Robinia species, including Robinia hispida, Robinia neomexicana, Robinia pseudacacia and Robinia viscosa. They mine the leaves of their host plant.
