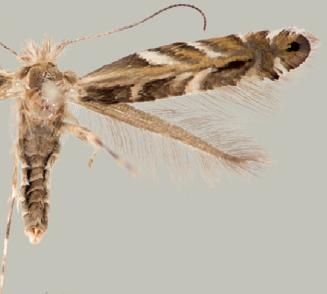

Scientific classification
- Kingdom: Animalia
- Phylum: Arthropoda
- Class: Insecta
- Order: Lepidoptera
- Family: Gracillariidae
- Genus: Macrosaccus
- Species: M. neomexicanus

Binomial name
- Macrosaccus neomexicanus Davis, 2011

= Macrosaccus neomexicanus =

Species of moth

Macrosaccus neomexicanus is a moth of the family Gracillariidae. It is known from the south-western United States in the states of Arizona and New Mexico.

The length of the forewings is 2.7–3.5 mm.

The larvae feed on Robinia neomexicana. They mine the leaves of their host plant. The mine begins as a relatively short, serpentine track which enlarges to an elongate-oval, whitish blotch located on the underside of the leaflet. As the larva develops and begins laying down silk, the mine becomes strongly tentiform, causing the upper surface to roll over.

== Etymology ==
The specific name is derived from the specific name of its plant host.

== Gallery ==
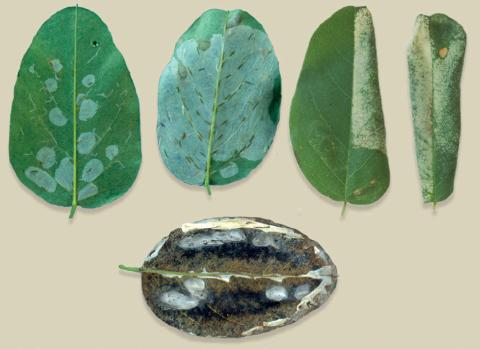
Mines
