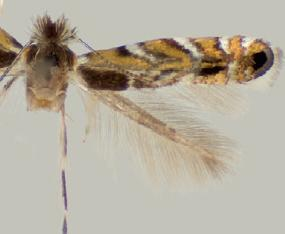

Scientific classification
- Kingdom: Animalia
- Phylum: Arthropoda
- Class: Insecta
- Order: Lepidoptera
- Family: Gracillariidae
- Genus: Macrosaccus
- Species: M. uhlerella

Binomial name
- Macrosaccus uhlerella (Fitch, 1859)

Synonyms
- Lithocolletis uhlerella Fitch, 1859; Phyllonorycter uhlerella; Phyllonorycter amorphae (Frey & Boll, 1878); Phyllonorycter amorphaeella (Chambers, 1877)

= Macrosaccus uhlerella =

Species of moth

Macrosaccus uhlerella is a moth of the family Gracillariidae. It is known from Illinois, Missouri, New York, Colorado and Texas in the United States.

The wingspan is 6-6.5 mm.

The larvae feed on Amorpha species (including Amorpha fruticosa) and Robinia species. They mine the leaves of their host plant. The mature mine is an elongate-oval, whitish blotch located on the underside of the leaf usually near the edge of the leaflet. Eventually, as the mine becomes tentiform, the leaf edge is slightly curled.

== Gallery ==
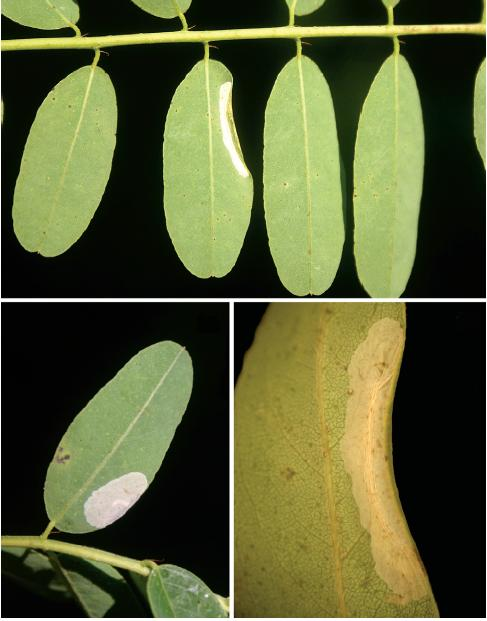
Mines on Amorpha fruticosa
