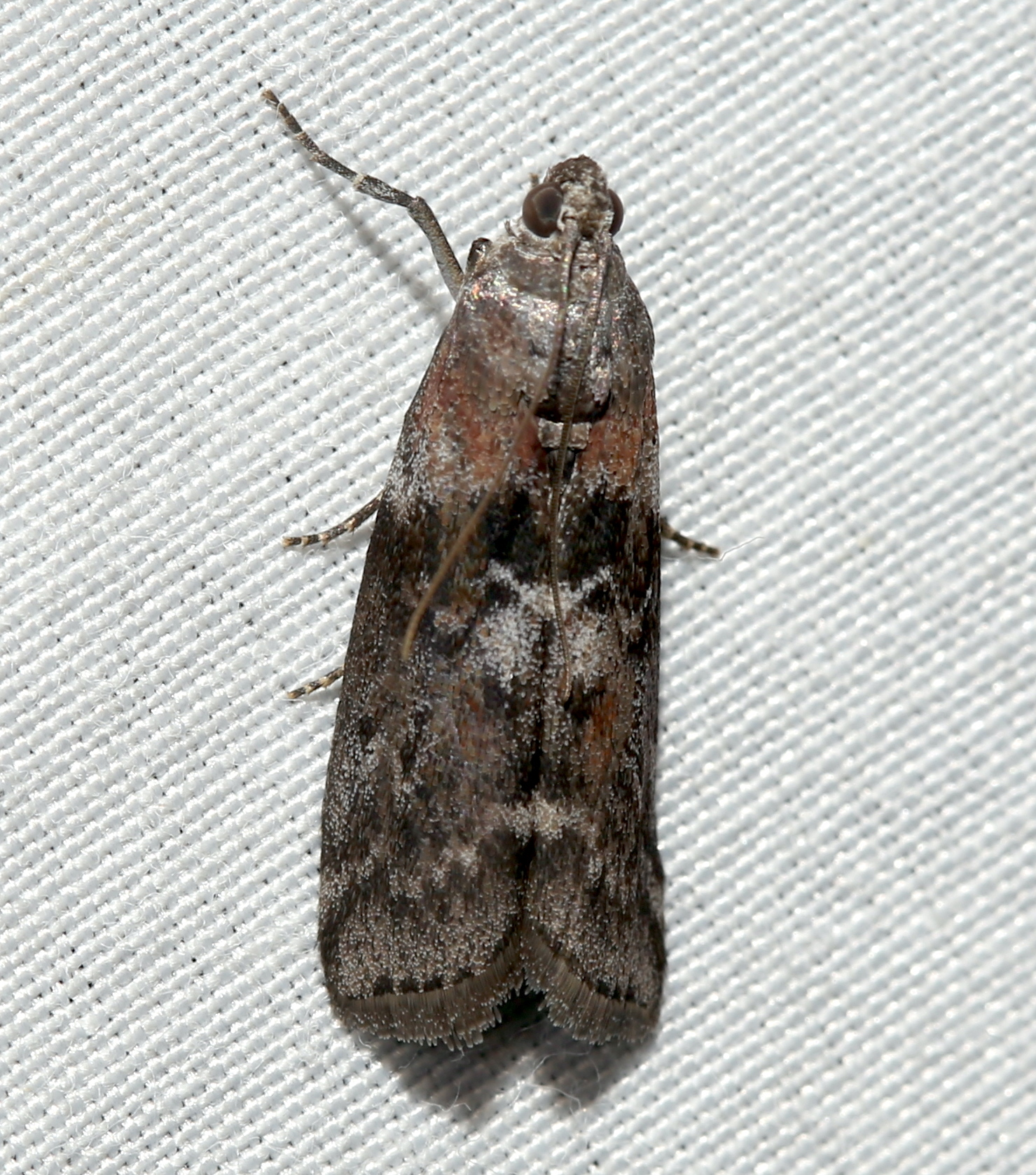

Scientific classification
- Kingdom: Animalia
- Phylum: Arthropoda
- Clade: Pancrustacea
- Class: Insecta
- Order: Lepidoptera
- Family: Pyralidae
- Genus: Sciota
- Species: S. subcaesiella

Binomial name
- Sciota subcaesiella (Clemens, 1860)

Synonyms
- Pempelia subcaesiella Clemens, 1860; Nephopterix subcaesiella; Nephopterix contatella Grote, 1880

= Sciota subcaesiella =

Species of moth

Sciota subcaesiella, the locust leafroller moth, is a species of moth of the family Pyralidae. It is found in North America, including Maryland, New Jersey, Oklahoma, Iowa, North Carolina, South Carolina, Georgia, Alabama, Mississippi, Maine, New Hampshire, New York, Massachusetts, Pennsylvania, the District of Columbia, Virginia, Tennessee, Illinois, Missouri, Arkansas, Nova Scotia and Ontario.

The larvae feed on Robinia hispida, Robinia pseudoacacia, Robinia viscosa and Robinia nana.
