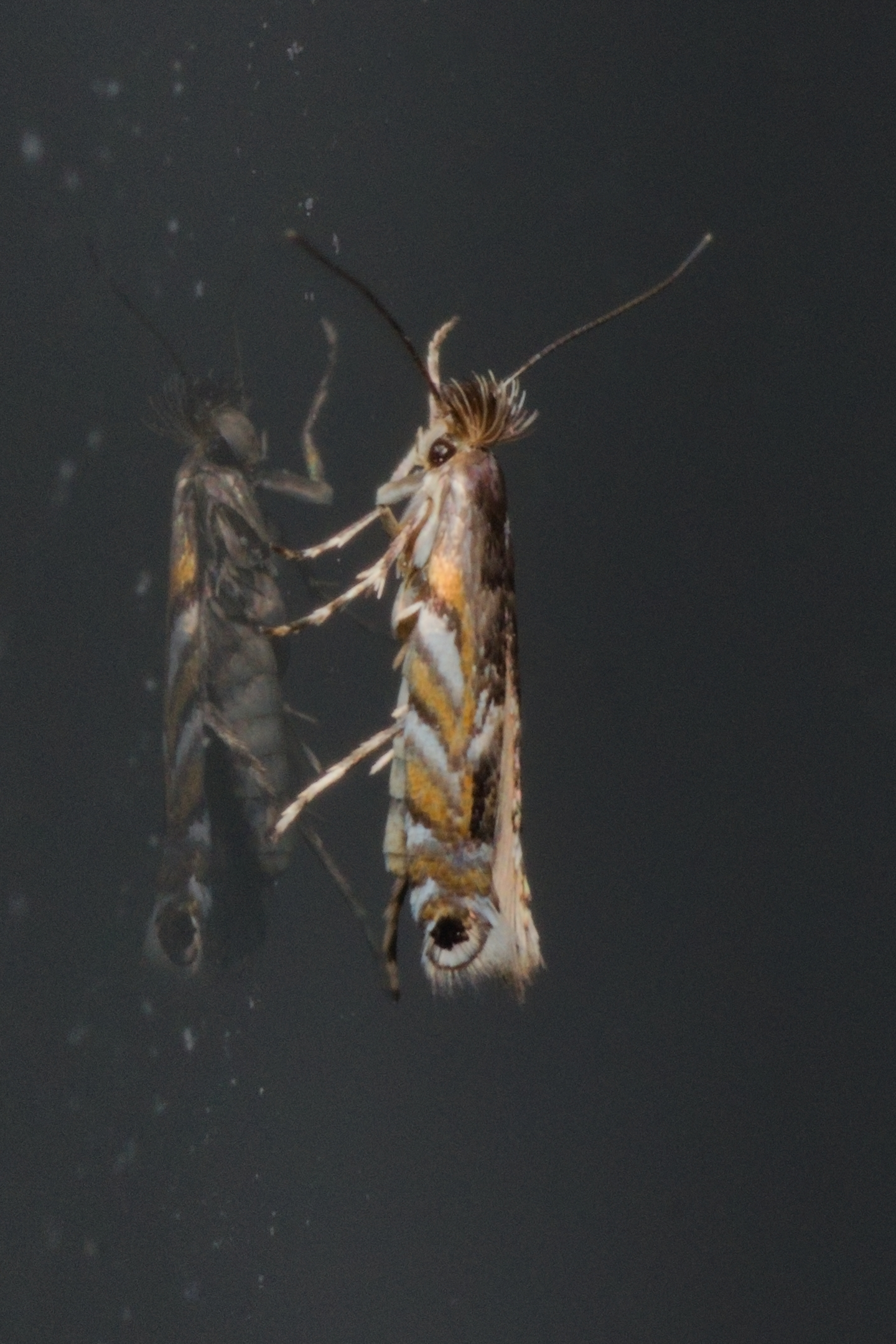
- Adult

Scientific classification
- Kingdom: Animalia
- Phylum: Arthropoda
- Class: Insecta
- Order: Lepidoptera
- Family: Gracillariidae
- Genus: Macrosaccus
- Species: M. robiniella

Binomial name
- Macrosaccus robiniella (Clemens, 1859)

Synonyms
- Lithocolletis robiniella Clemens, 1859; Phyllonorycter robiniella; Argyromiges pseudacaciella Fitch, 1859; Lithocolletis pseudacaciella

= Macrosaccus robiniella =

Species of moth

Macrosaccus robiniella is a moth of the family Gracillariidae.

== Distribution ==
It is native to and widely distributed in North America, but is an introduced species in Europe, where it was first reported near Basel, Switzerland, in 1983. Later, it was also reported in France, Germany, northern Italy (1988), Austria (1989), and Slovakia (1992). It spread gradually through Austria, reaching Hungary in the mid 1990s.

== Adult description ==
The wingspan is 5.5 to 6.5 mm. There are two to three generations per year.

== Life history ==
The larvae feed on Robinia pseudoacacia, Robinia viscosa and Robinia hispida. They mine the leaves of their host plant. The mine begins as an elongate serpentine track which enlarges to an elongate-oval, whitish blotch located on one side of the midrib and usually on the underside of the leaflet. Eventually the mine becomes slightly tentiform due to the silk laid down by the later instar larvae. There are five larval instars. The earliest instars are highly modified sapfeeders with strongly depressed bodies and reduced chaetotaxy with a maximum length 3.7 mm. Later instars are tissue feeders, with cylindrical bodies and a maximum length of 4.7 mm. The body colour is pale green to white.

== Natural enemies ==
Fifty seven parasitoid species (including two unidentified) of Hymenoptera are recorded for M. robiniella, the great majority of which belongs to the family Eulophidae.

== Gallery ==
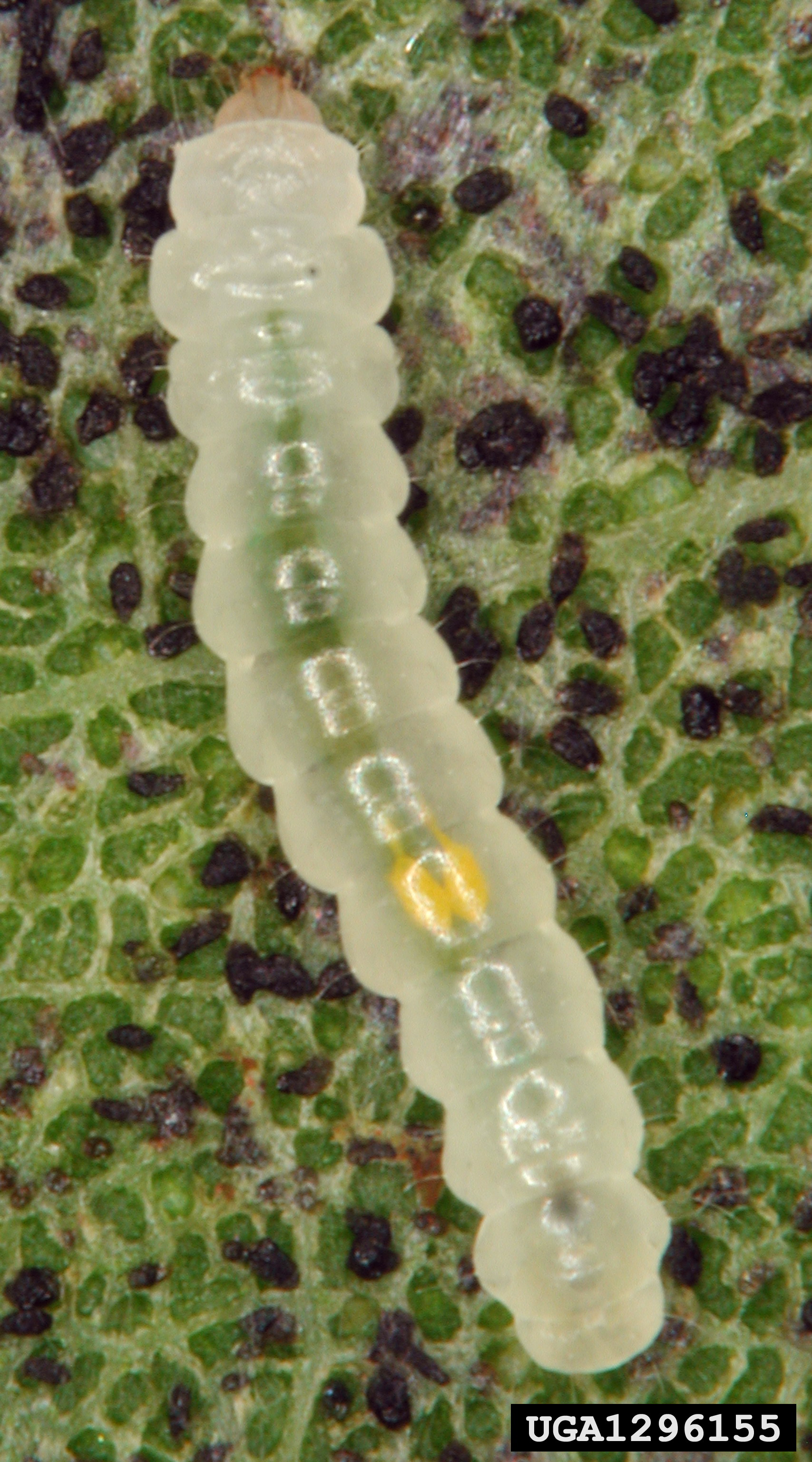
Larva

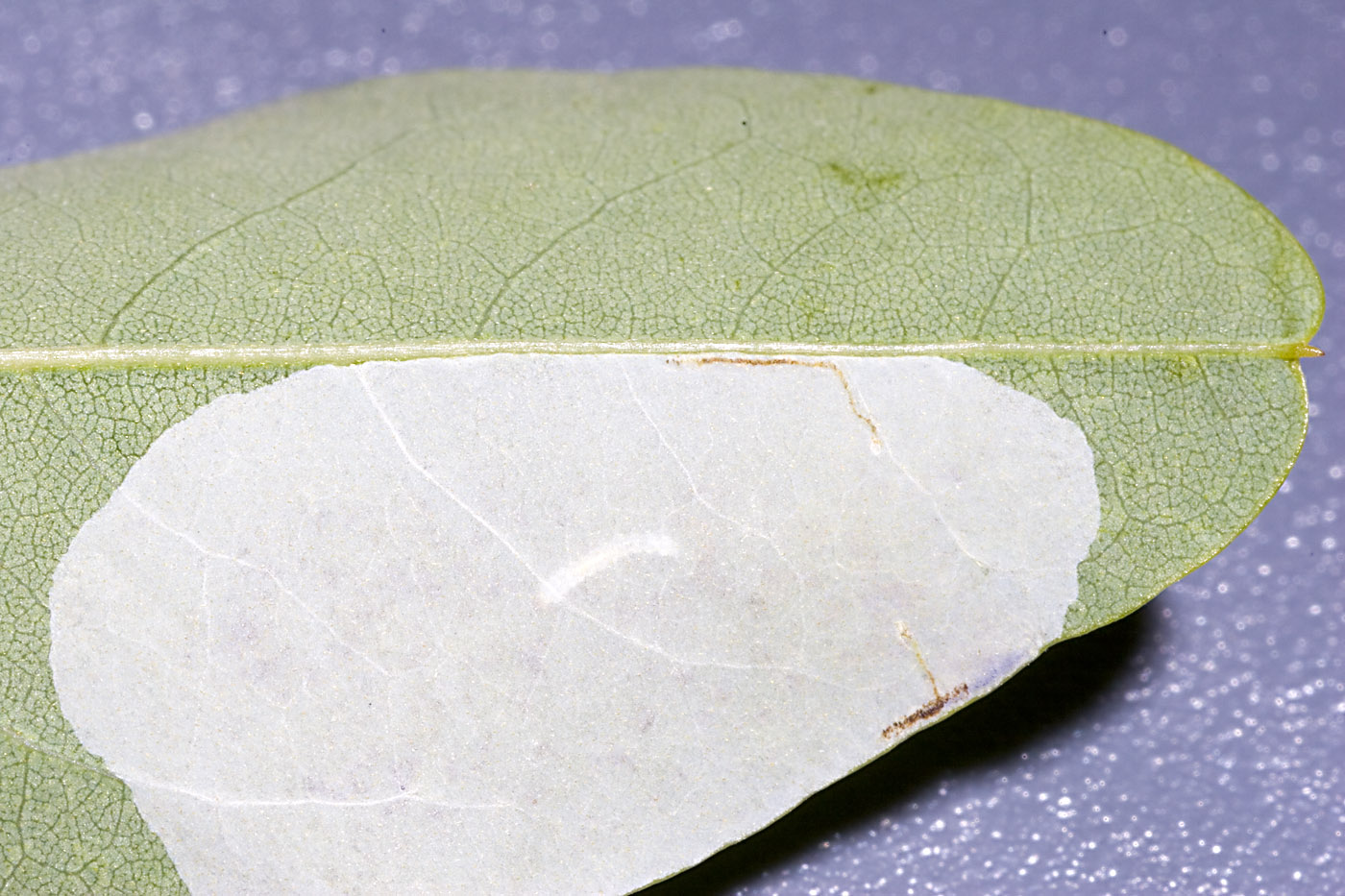
Larva on a leaf

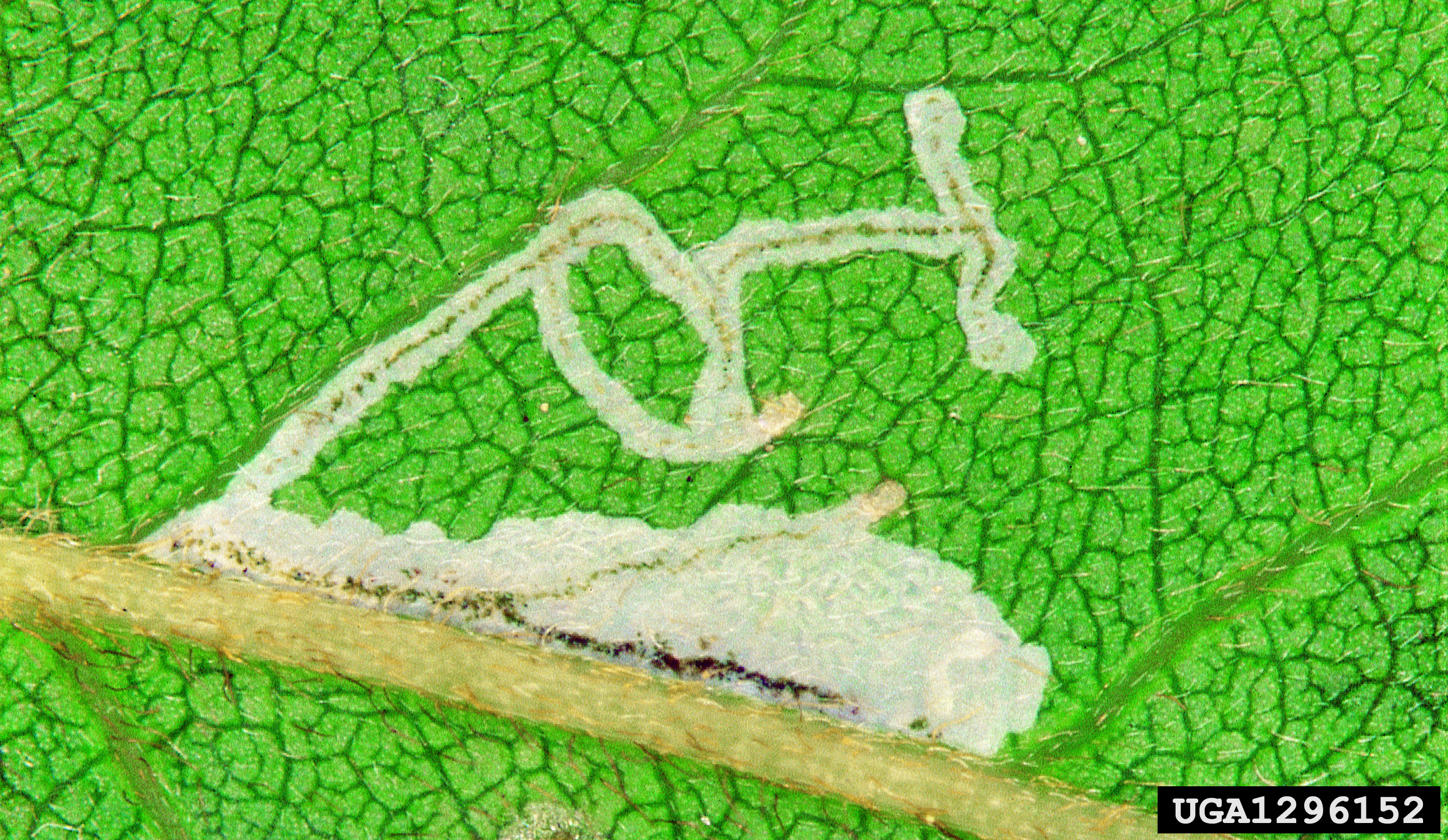
Close-up of damage

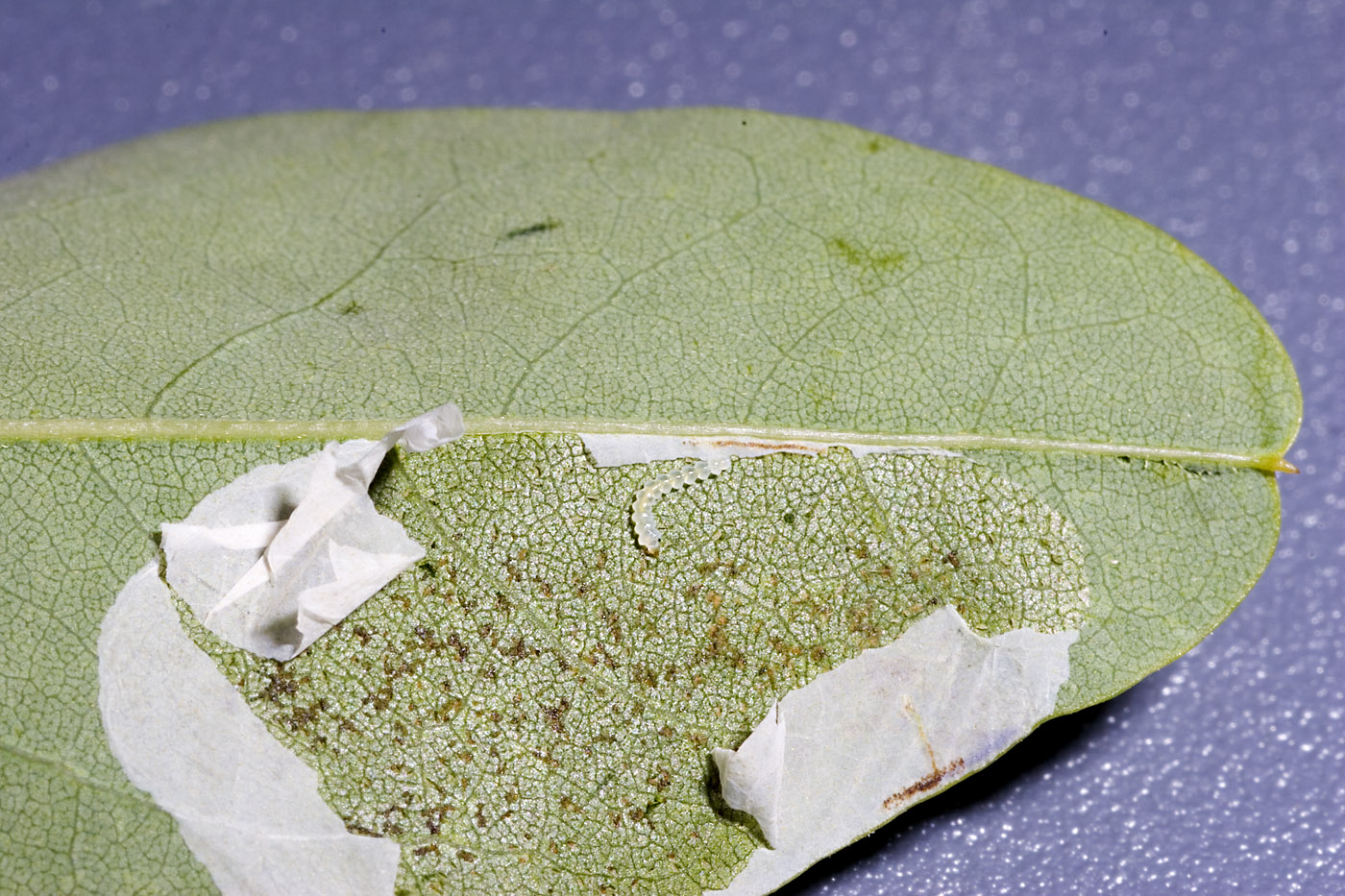
Leaf showing damage by Macrosaccus robiniella

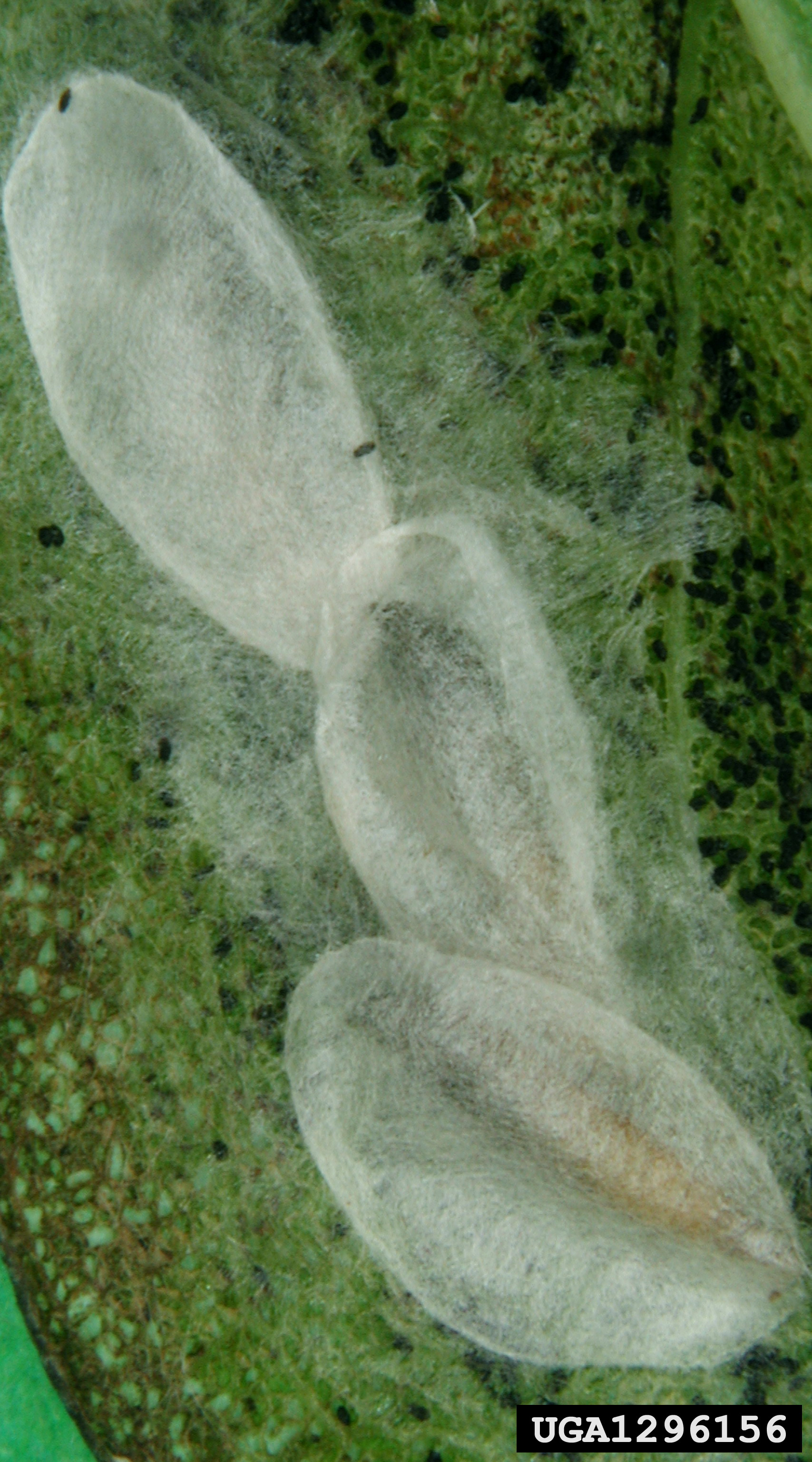
Cocoon
