= Sciota Township =

Sciota Township may refer to the following places in the United States:

- Sciota Township, McDonough County, Illinois
- Sciota Township, Shiawassee County, Michigan
- Sciota Township, Dakota County, Minnesota

See also

- Sciota (disambiguation)
