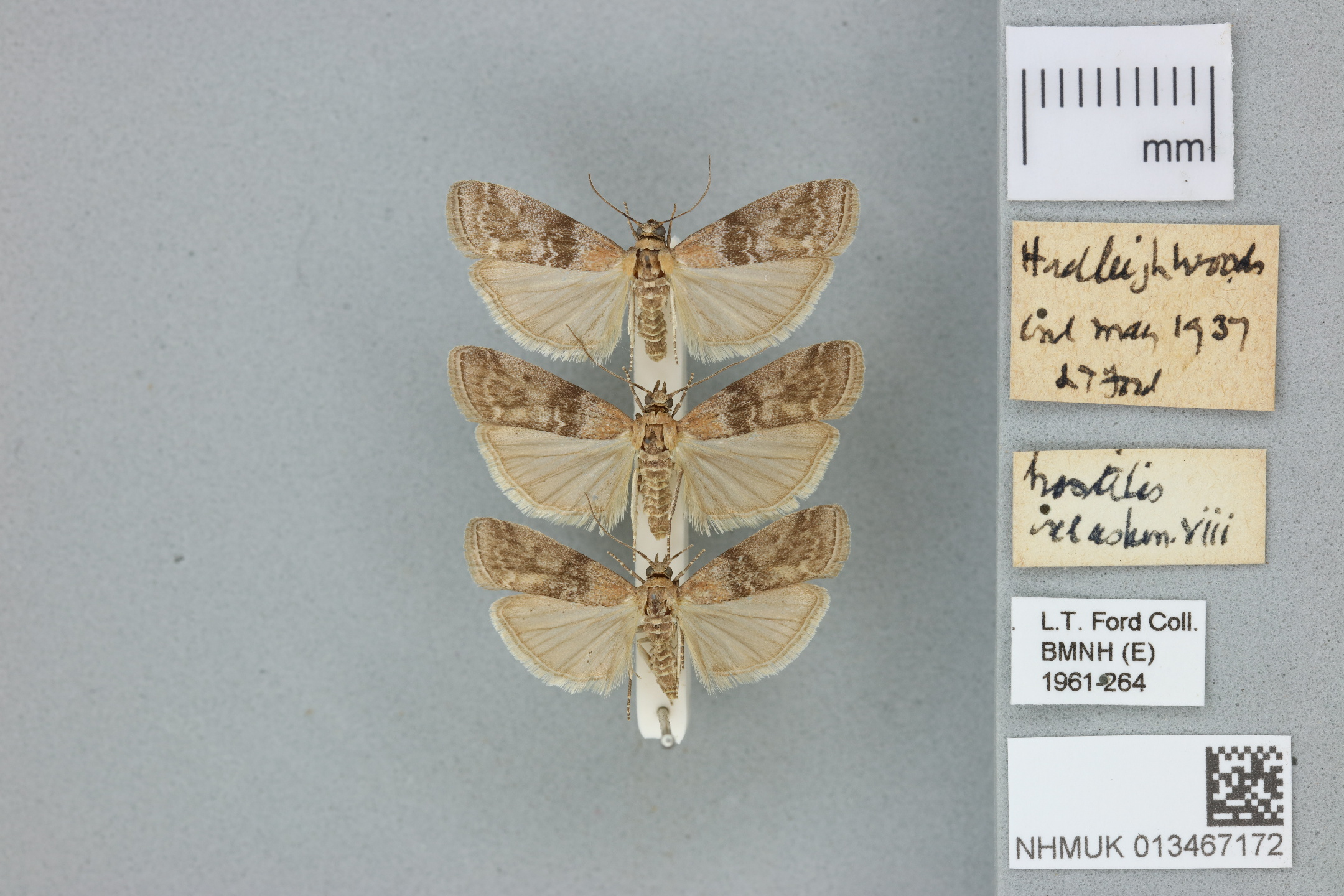
- Sciota hostilis specimen - (Stephens, 1834)

Scientific classification
- Domain: Eukaryota
- Kingdom: Animalia
- Phylum: Arthropoda
- Class: Insecta
- Order: Lepidoptera
- Family: Pyralidae
- Genus: Sciota
- Species: S. hostilis

Binomial name
- Sciota hostilis (Stephens, 1834)

Synonyms
- Phycita hostilis Stephens, 1834; Sciota hostilis betuleti Gozmány, 1953

= Sciota hostilis =

Species of moth

Sciota hostilis is a species of snout moth in the genus Sciota. It was described by Stephens in 1834. It is found in most of Europe (except the Iberian Peninsula, Ireland and most of the Balkan Peninsula).

The wingspan is 20–24 mm.

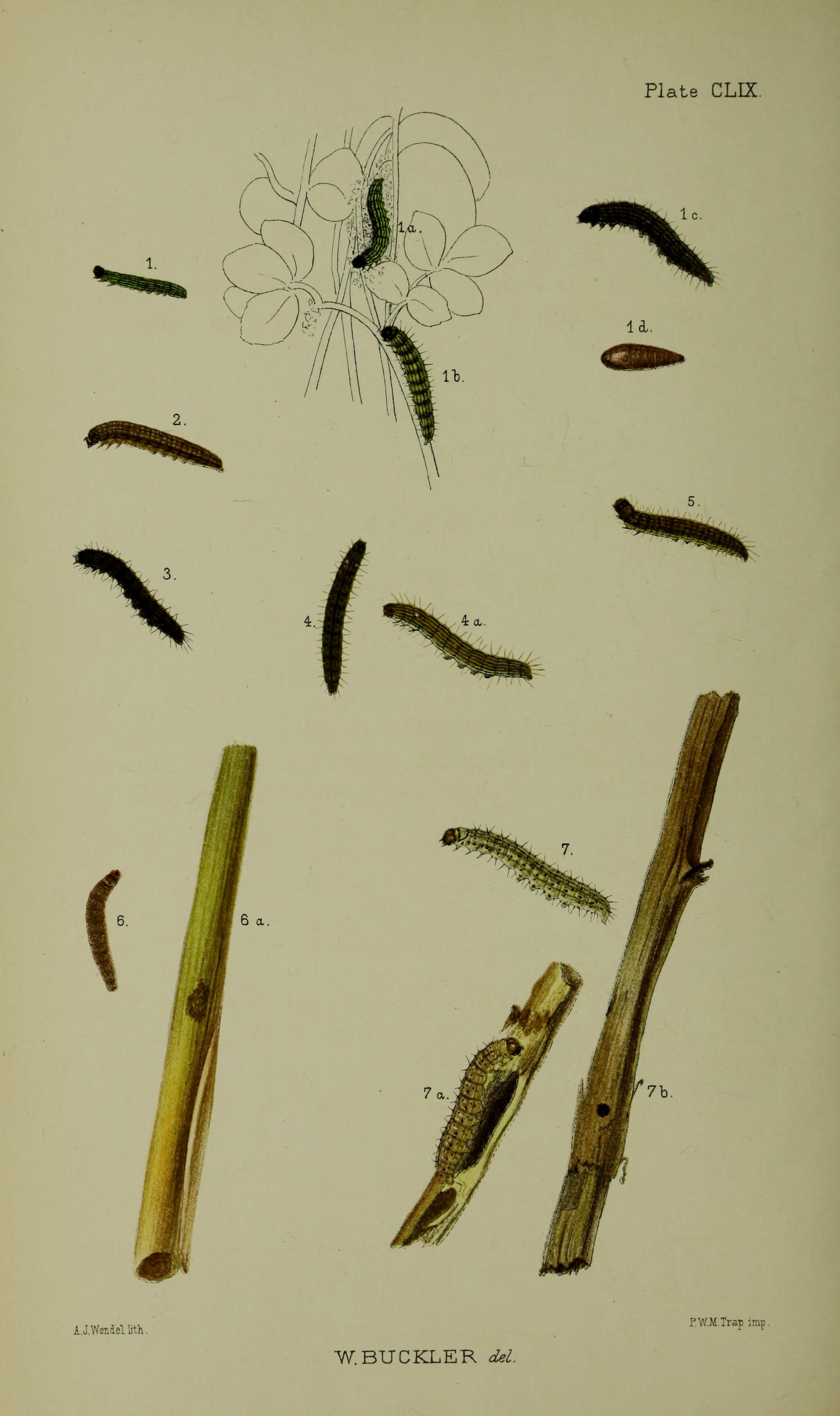
Fig. 5 larva after final moult
