= Sciota imperialella =

Scientific classification
- Domain: Eukaryota
- Kingdom: Animalia
- Phylum: Arthropoda
- Class: Insecta
- Order: Lepidoptera
- Family: Pyralidae
- Genus: Sciota
- Species: S. imperialella

Binomial name
- Sciota imperialella (Ragonot, 1887)

Synonyms
- Nephopterix imperialella Ragonot, 1887

Species of moth

Sciota imperialella is a species of snout moth in the genus Sciota. It was described by Ragonot in 1887. It is found in Greece and North Macedonia.

The wingspan is about 30 mm.
