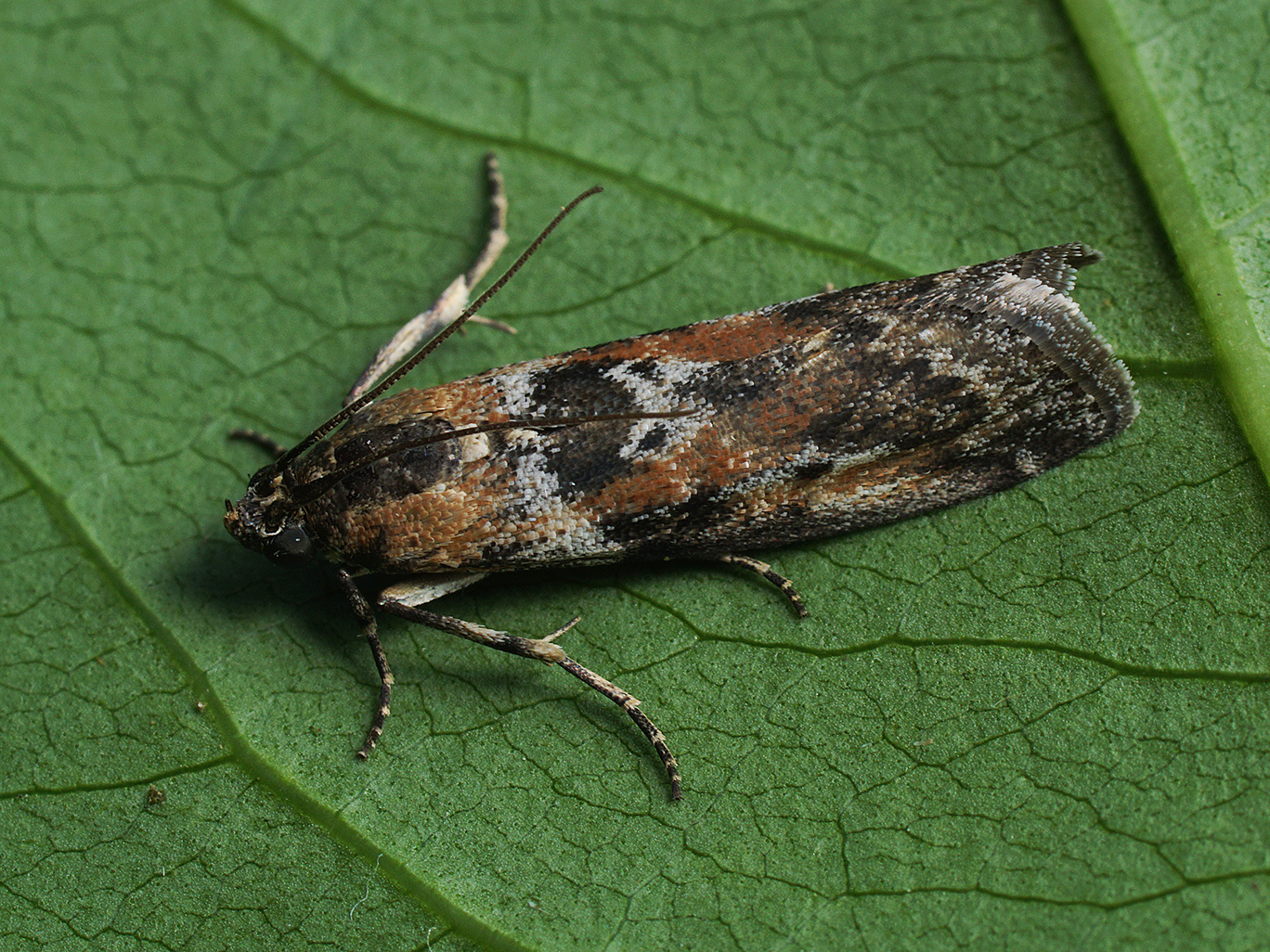

Scientific classification
- Domain: Eukaryota
- Kingdom: Animalia
- Phylum: Arthropoda
- Class: Insecta
- Order: Lepidoptera
- Family: Pyralidae
- Genus: Sciota
- Species: S. marmorata

Binomial name
- Sciota marmorata (Alphéraky, 1877)

Synonyms
- Nephopterix marmorata Alphéraky, 1876; Myrlaea marmorata

= Sciota marmorata =

Species of moth

Sciota marmorata is a species of snout moth in the genus Sciota. It was described by Sergei Alphéraky in 1877. It is found in Romania, Ukraine and Russia.

The larvae have been recorded feeding on Caragana arborescens and Robinia pseudoacacia.
