= Sciota barteli =

Scientific classification
- Domain: Eukaryota
- Kingdom: Animalia
- Phylum: Arthropoda
- Class: Insecta
- Order: Lepidoptera
- Family: Pyralidae
- Genus: Sciota
- Species: S. barteli

Binomial name
- Sciota barteli (Caradja, 1910)

Synonyms
- Salebria adelphella var. barteli Caradja, 1910

Species of moth

Sciota barteli is a species of snout moth in the genus Sciota. It was described by Aristide Caradja in 1910. It is found in Kazakhstan.
