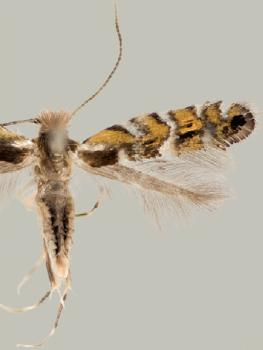

Scientific classification
- Domain: Eukaryota
- Kingdom: Animalia
- Phylum: Arthropoda
- Class: Insecta
- Order: Lepidoptera
- Family: Gracillariidae
- Genus: Macrosaccus
- Species: M. morrisella

Binomial name
- Macrosaccus morrisella (Fitch, 1859)

Synonyms
- Argyromiges morrisella Fitch, 1859; Lithocolletis morrisella (Fitch, 1859); Phyllonorycter morrisella (Fitch, 1859); Phyllonorycter amphicarpaeella (Dyar, 1903); Phyllonorycter amphicarpeaeella (Chambers, 1877); Phyllonorycter texanella (Zeller, 1875)

= Macrosaccus morrisella =

Hog peanut moth

Species of moth

Macrosaccus morrisella (hog peanut moth) is a moth of the family Gracillariidae. In North America it is known from Manitoba, Ontario, and Quebec, south and west to Texas and Colorado.

The wingspan is 6–7 mm.

The larvae feed on Amphicarpaea bracteata, Strophostyles leiosperma, and soybean (Glycine max). They mine the leaves of their host plant. The mine begins as an elongate serpentine track on the underside of the leaflet. This enlarges to an elongate-oval, whitish blotch which eventually becomes strongly tentiform.

== Gallery ==
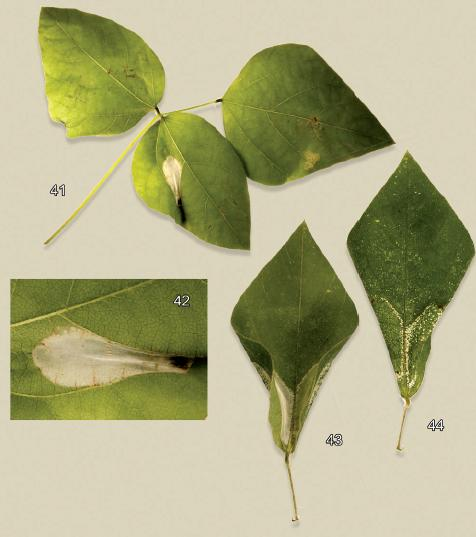
Mines on Amphicarpaea bracteata
