= Sciota obscurella =

Scientific classification
- Kingdom: Animalia
- Phylum: Arthropoda
- Class: Insecta
- Order: Lepidoptera
- Family: Pyralidae
- Genus: Sciota
- Species: S. obscurella

Binomial name
- Sciota obscurella (Caradja in Caradja & Meyrick, 1937)

Synonyms
- Dentinosa obscurella Caradja in Caradja & Meyrick, 1937; Denticera obscurella; Apodentinodia obscurella

Species of moth

Sciota obscurella is a species of snout moth. It is found in China (Yunnan).
