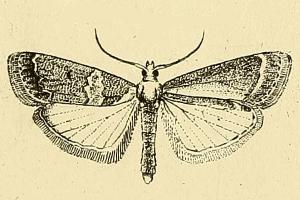

Scientific classification
- Domain: Eukaryota
- Kingdom: Animalia
- Phylum: Arthropoda
- Class: Insecta
- Order: Lepidoptera
- Family: Pyralidae
- Genus: Sciota
- Species: S. insignella

Binomial name
- Sciota insignella (J. J. Mann, 1862)

Synonyms
- Nephopteryx insignella J. J. Mann, 1862

= Sciota insignella =

Species of moth

Sciota insignella is a species of snout moth in the genus Sciota. It was described by Josef Johann Mann in 1862. It is found in Romania, Bulgaria, Turkey and Croatia.
