= Sciota rungsi =

Scientific classification
- Domain: Eukaryota
- Kingdom: Animalia
- Phylum: Arthropoda
- Class: Insecta
- Order: Lepidoptera
- Family: Pyralidae
- Genus: Sciota
- Species: S. rungsi

Binomial name
- Sciota rungsi Leraut, 2002

Species of moth

Sciota rungsi is a species of snout moth in the genus Sciota. It was described by Patrice J.A. Leraut in 2002. It is found in Spain.
