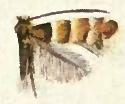
- Chrysaster ostensackenella

Scientific classification
- Kingdom: Animalia
- Phylum: Arthropoda
- Class: Insecta
- Order: Lepidoptera
- Family: Gracillariidae
- Subfamily: Lithocolletinae
- Genus: Chrysaster; Kumata, 1961

Species
- See text

= Chrysaster =

Genus of moths

Chrysaster is a genus of moths in the family Gracillariidae.

== Species ==
- Chrysaster hagicola Kumata, 1961
- Chrysaster ostensackenella (Fitch, 1859)
