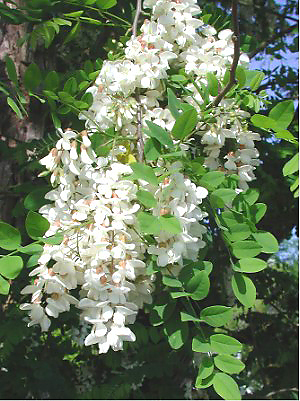
- Robinia pseudoacacia

Scientific classification
- Kingdom: Plantae
- Clade: Tracheophytes
- Clade: Angiosperms
- Clade: Eudicots
- Clade: Rosids
- Order: Fabales
- Family: Fabaceae
- Subfamily: Faboideae
- Tribe: Robinieae
- Genus: Robinia; L. (1753)

Species
- 4; see text

Synonyms
- Pseudacacia Moench (1794), nom. superfl.; Pseudo-acacia Duhamel (1755), nom. superfl.

= Robinia =

Genus of (flowering) plants

Robinia is a genus of flowering plants in the family Fabaceae, tribe Robinieae, native to North America. Commonly known as locusts, they are deciduous trees and shrubs growing 4–25 metres (13–82 ft) tall. The leaves are pinnate with 7–21 oval leaflets. The flowers are white or pink, in usually pendulous racemes. Many species have thorny shoots, and several have sticky hairs on the shoots.

The genus is named after the royal French gardeners Jean Robin and his son Vespasien Robin, who introduced the plant to Europe in 1601.

The number of species is disputed between different authorities, with as few as four recognised by some authors, while others recognise up to 10 species. Several natural hybrids are also known.

Some species of Robinia are used as food by caterpillars of Lepidoptera, including such moths as the brown-tail (Euproctis chrysorrhoea), the buff-tip (Phalera bucephala), the engrailed (Ectropis crepuscularia), the giant leopard moth (Hypercompe scribonia), the locust underwing (Euparthenos nubilis), and Gracillariidae leaf miners like Chrysaster ostensackenella, Macrosaccus robiniella and Parectopa robiniella.

== Toxicity ==
All species produce toxic lectins, throughout the entire plant, with the exception of the flowers. The flowers are used in teas and in pancakes, and are consumed as fritters in many parts of Europe.

== Species ==
- Robinia hispida L.– bristly locust
  - Robinia hispida var. rosea (syn. R. boyntonii)
  - Robinia hispida var. nana (syns. R. elliottii & R. nana)
  - Robinia hispida var. kelseyi (syn. R. kelseyi)
- Robinia neomexicana A.Gray (syn. R. luxurians) – New Mexican locust
- Robinia pseudoacacia L. – black locust, false acacia
- Robinia viscosa Michx. ex Vent. – clammy locust
  - Robinia viscosa var. hartwegii (syn. R. hartwegii or R. hartwigii)
- †Robinia zirkelii

=== Hybrids ===
- Robinia × ambigua (R. pseudoacacia × R. viscosa) – Idaho locust
- Robinia × holdtii (R. neomexicana × R. pseudoacacia)
- Robinia × longiloba (R. hispida × R. viscosa)
- Robinia × margarettiae (R. hispida × R. pseudoacacia)
