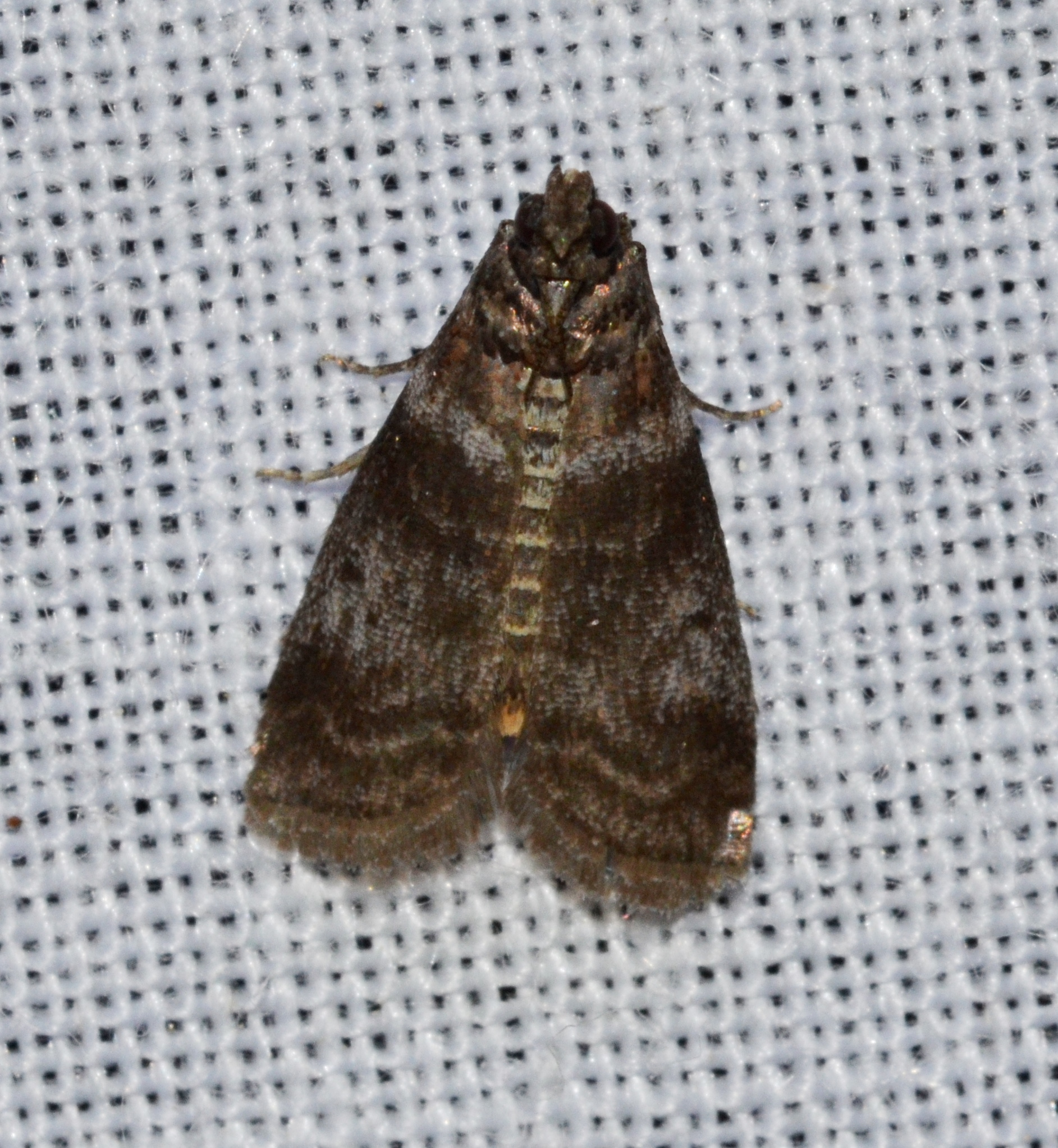

Scientific classification
- Domain: Eukaryota
- Kingdom: Animalia
- Phylum: Arthropoda
- Class: Insecta
- Order: Lepidoptera
- Family: Pyralidae
- Genus: Sciota
- Species: S. uvinella

Binomial name
- Sciota uvinella (Ragonot, 1887)

Synonyms
- Meroptera uvinella Ragonot, 1887; Meroptera liquidambarella Dyar, 1904; Salebria afflictella Hulst, 1900

= Sciota uvinella =

Species of moth

Sciota uvinella, the sweetgum leafroller moth, is a species of snout moth in the genus Sciota. It was described by Ragonot in 1887. It is found in North America, where it has been recorded from New Jersey to Florida, west to Texas and Kentucky. Adults are on wing from April to September.

The larvae feed on Liquidambar styraciflua.

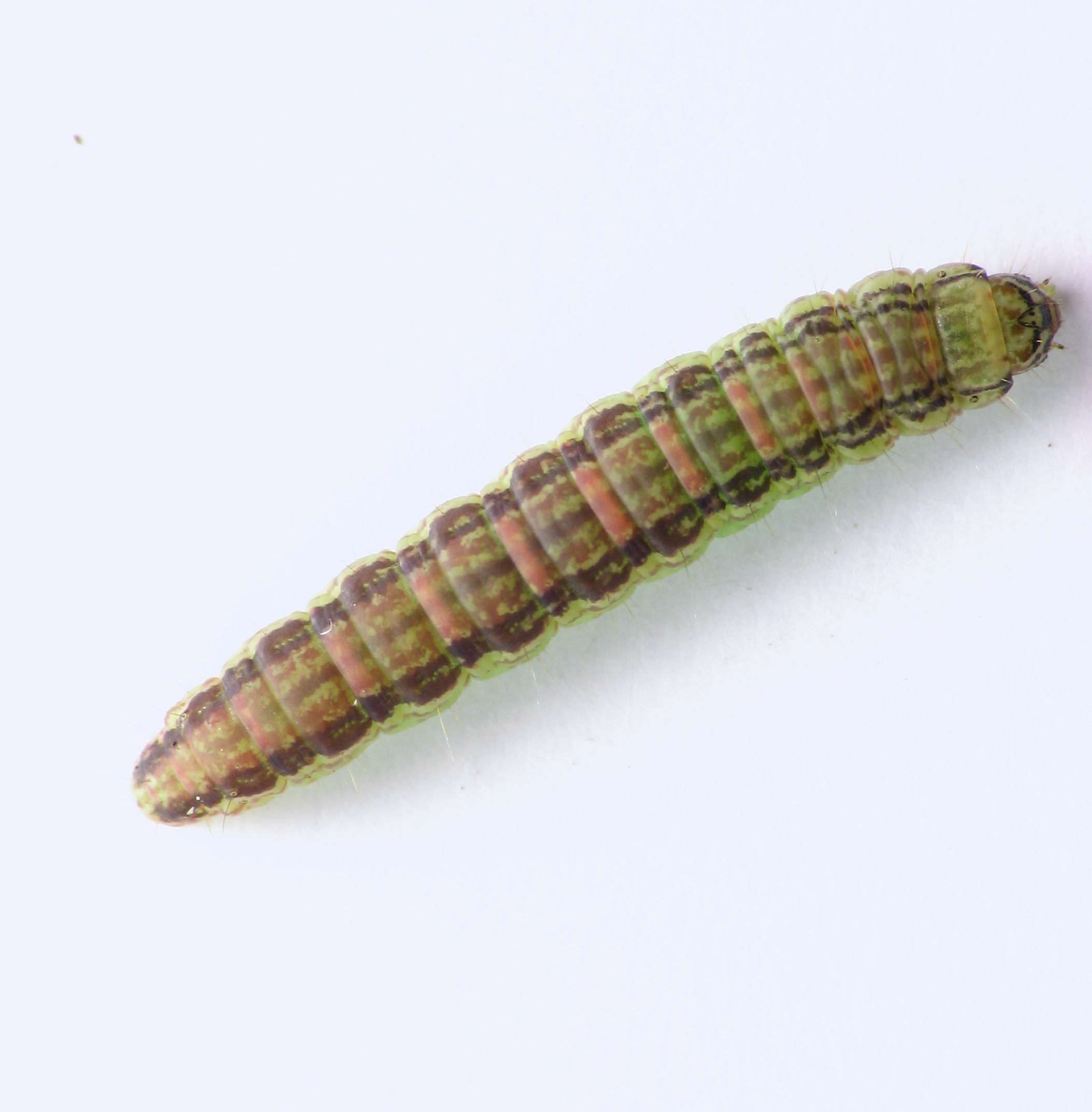
Larva found on sweetgum
