= Macrosaccus coursetiae =

Scientific classification
- Kingdom: Animalia
- Phylum: Arthropoda
- Class: Insecta
- Order: Lepidoptera
- Family: Gracillariidae
- Genus: Macrosaccus
- Species: M. coursetiae

Binomial name
- Macrosaccus coursetiae Eiseman & Davis, 2017

Species of moth

Macrosaccus coursetiae is a moth of the family Gracillariidae. It is known from Arizona in the United States.

The larvae feed on Coursetia glandulosa. They mine the leaves of their host plant.

Larvae are parasitized by Chrysocharis walleyi, a parasitoid wasp in the family (Eulophidae).
