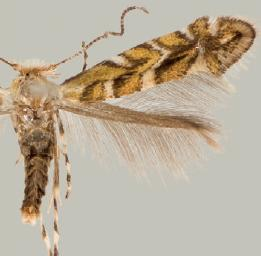

Scientific classification
- Kingdom: Animalia
- Phylum: Arthropoda
- Class: Insecta
- Order: Lepidoptera
- Family: Gracillariidae
- Genus: Macrosaccus
- Species: M. gliricidius

Binomial name
- Macrosaccus gliricidius Davis, 2011

= Macrosaccus gliricidius =

Species of moth

Macrosaccus gliricidius is a moth of the family Gracillariidae. It is known from Central America (such as Honduras) and the West Indies (such as Guadeloupe).

The length of the forewings is 2.2–2.6 mm.

The larvae feed on Gliricidia sepium. They mine the leaves of their host plant. The mine begins as an elongate serpentine track which abruptly enlarges to an elongate-oval, whitish blotch located on either the upper or lower side of the leaflet. When present on the under side, the blotch mines usually develop along the midrib. Only the upperside blotch mines occurred directly on top of the midrib.

== Etymology ==
The species name is derived from the generic name of its host, Gliricidia.

== Gallery ==
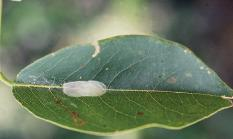
Blotch mine

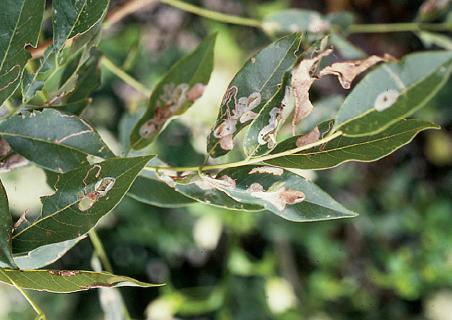
Damage

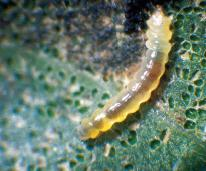
Tissue feeding instar

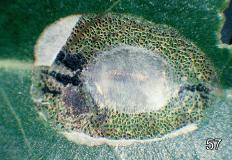
Open blotch mine with single cocoon

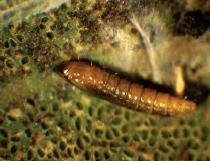
Pupa with cocoon removed
