= Chrysaster hagicola =

Scientific classification
- Kingdom: Animalia
- Phylum: Arthropoda
- Class: Insecta
- Order: Lepidoptera
- Family: Gracillariidae
- Genus: Chrysaster
- Species: C. hagicola

Binomial name
- Chrysaster hagicola Kumata, 1961

Species of moth

Chrysaster hagicola is a moth of the family Gracillariidae. It is known from Japan (Hokkaidō, Honshū, Shikoku and Kyūshū), Korea and the Russian Far East.

The wingspan is 4.5–5 mm.

The larvae feed on Lespedeza bicolor and Lespedeza cyrtobotrya. They mine the leaves of their host plant.
