= Sciota basilaris =

Scientific classification
- Kingdom: Animalia
- Phylum: Arthropoda
- Clade: Pancrustacea
- Class: Insecta
- Order: Lepidoptera
- Family: Pyralidae
- Genus: Sciota
- Species: S. basilaris

Binomial name
- Sciota basilaris Zeller, 1872

Species of moth

Sciota basilaris is a species of moth in the family Pyralidae. It was described by Philipp Christoph Zeller in 1872, and is known from northern North America.
