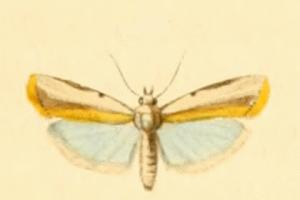

Scientific classification
- Domain: Eukaryota
- Kingdom: Animalia
- Phylum: Arthropoda
- Class: Insecta
- Order: Lepidoptera
- Family: Pyralidae
- Genus: Sciota
- Species: S. divisella

Binomial name
- Sciota divisella (Duponchel, 1842)

Synonyms
- Phycis divisella Duponchel, 1842; Denticera divisella; Denticera sardzeella Amsel, 1961

= Sciota divisella =

Species of moth

Sciota divisella is a species of snout moth. It was described by Philogène Auguste Joseph Duponchel in 1842 and is found in Spain, France, Italy, Croatia, Bosnia and Herzegovina, Greece, Bulgaria, Ukraine and Iran.
