= Sciota lucipetella =

Scientific classification
- Domain: Eukaryota
- Kingdom: Animalia
- Phylum: Arthropoda
- Class: Insecta
- Order: Lepidoptera
- Family: Pyralidae
- Genus: Sciota
- Species: S. lucipetella

Binomial name
- Sciota lucipetella (Jalava, 1978)

Synonyms
- Nephopterix lucipetella Jalava, 1978

Species of moth

Sciota lucipetella is a species of snout moth in the genus Sciota. It was described by Jalava in 1978. It is found in Finland, Estonia and Latvia. It has also been recorded in Russia.

The wingspan is 17–22 mm.
