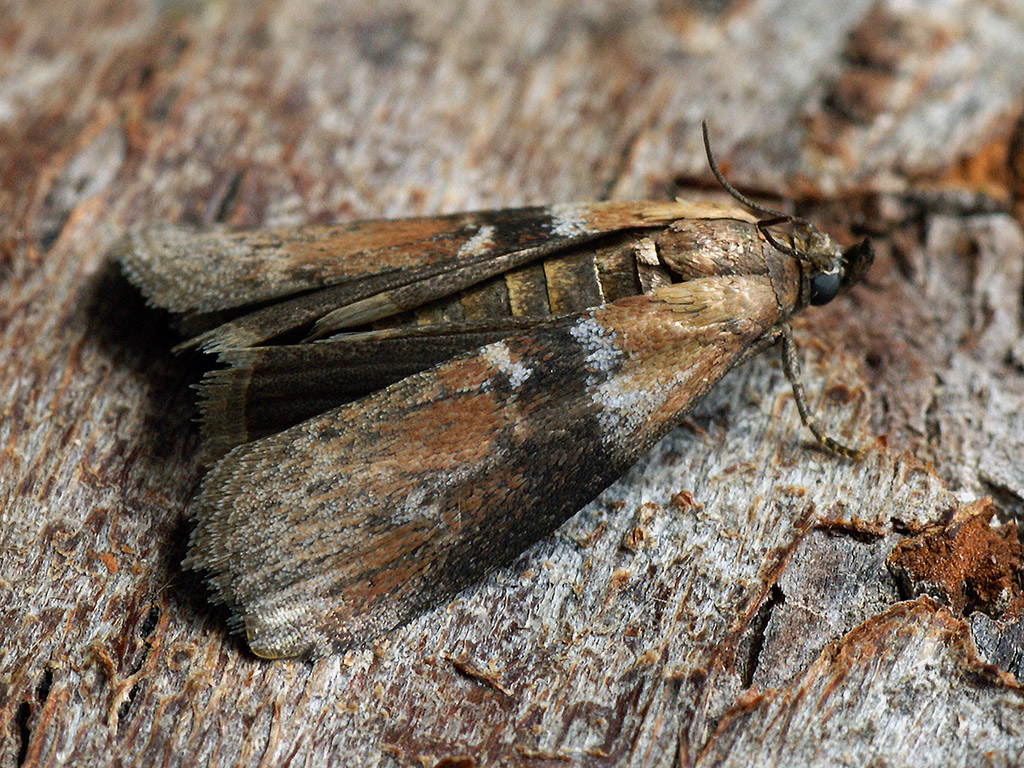

Scientific classification
- Domain: Eukaryota
- Kingdom: Animalia
- Phylum: Arthropoda
- Class: Insecta
- Order: Lepidoptera
- Family: Pyralidae
- Genus: Sciota
- Species: S. fumella

Binomial name
- Sciota fumella (Eversmann, 1844)

Synonyms
- Phycis fumella Eversmann, 1844; Clasperopsis fumella; Nephopterix hartigi Roesler, 1974; Sciota hartigi; Nephopterix tristis Alphéraky, 1880

= Sciota fumella =

Species of moth

Sciota fumella is a species of snout moth in the genus Sciota. It was described by Eduard Friedrich Eversmann in 1844. It is found in France, Switzerland, Austria, Italy, Poland, the Czech Republic, Slovakia, Hungary, Slovenia, Romania, Ukraine, Russia, Finland and the Baltic region.

The wingspan is about 20–24 mm.
