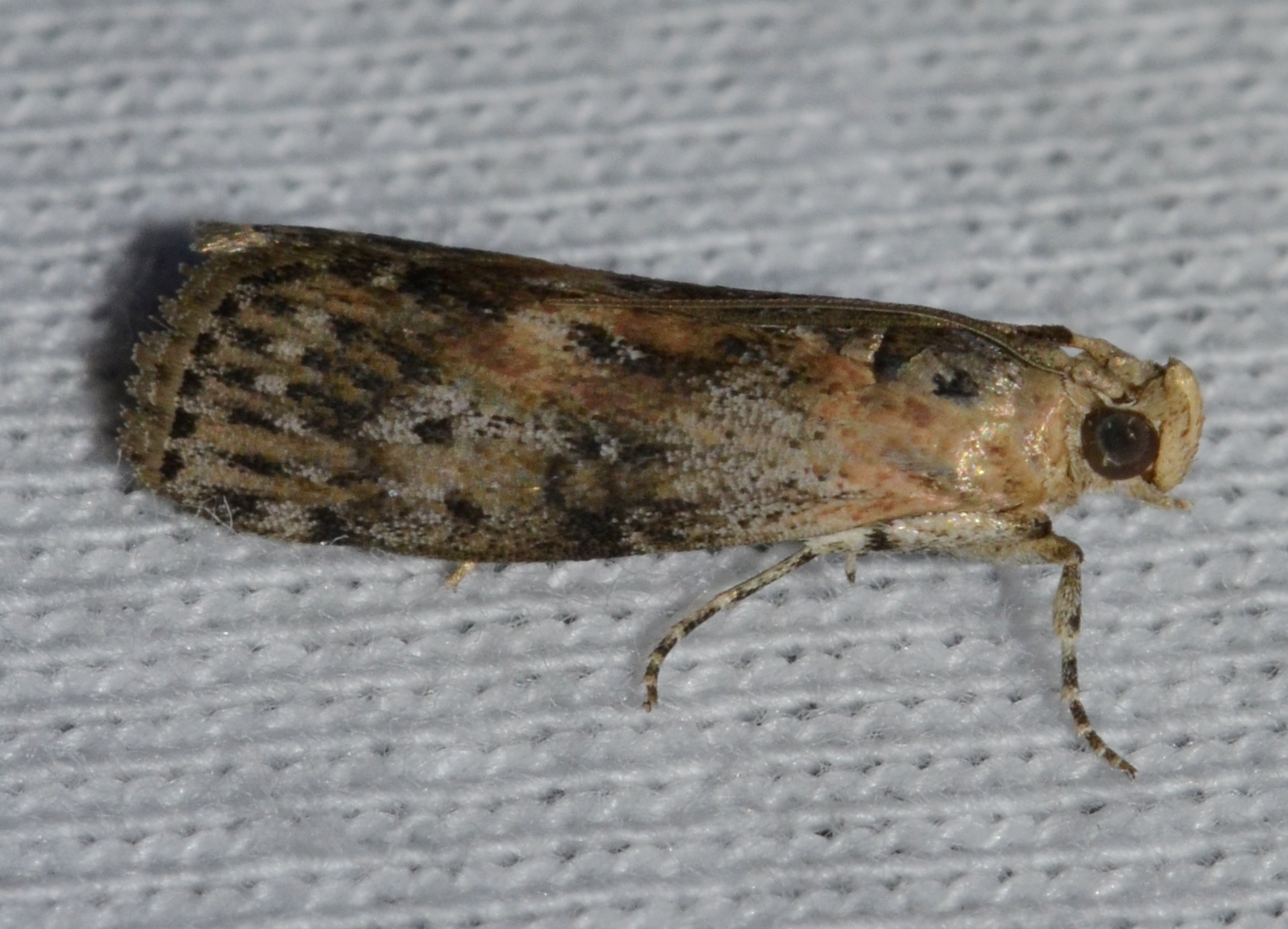

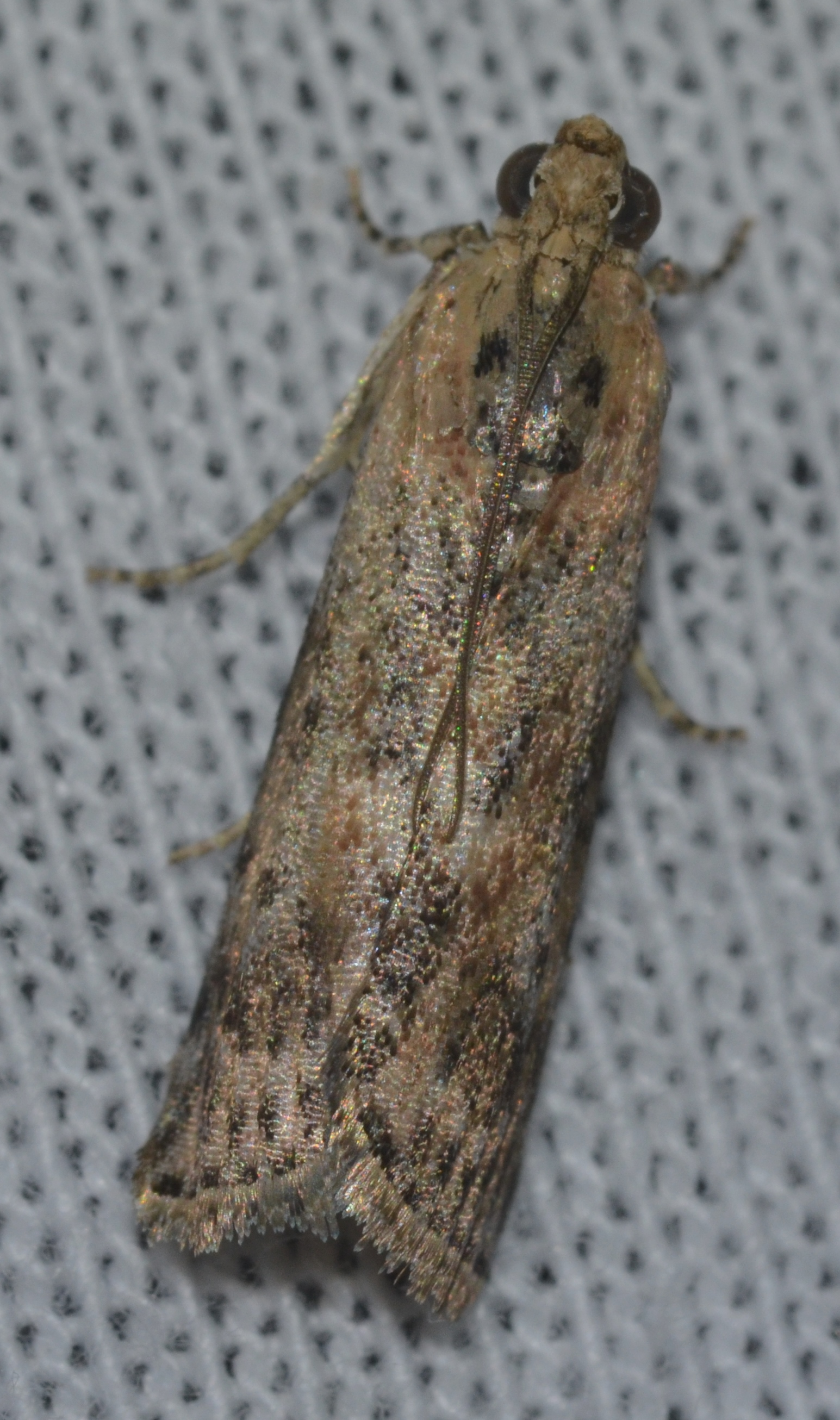

Scientific classification
- Kingdom: Animalia
- Phylum: Arthropoda
- Clade: Pancrustacea
- Class: Insecta
- Order: Lepidoptera
- Family: Pyralidae
- Genus: Sciota
- Species: S. virgatella

Binomial name
- Sciota virgatella (Clemens, 1860)

Synonyms
- Pempelia virgatella Clemens, 1860; Nephopterix virgatella; Pempelia contatella quinquepunctella Grote, 1880

= Sciota virgatella =

Species of moth

Sciota virgatella, the black-spotted leafroller moth, is a species of snout moth in the genus Sciota. It was described by James Brackenridge Clemens in 1860. It is found in North America, where it has been recorded from Arkansas, Florida, Georgia, Illinois, Indiana, Maine, Maryland, Massachusetts, Minnesota, New Jersey, New York, North Carolina, Ohio, Oklahoma, Ontario, Pennsylvania, Quebec, South Carolina, Tennessee, Texas, Virginia and West Virginia.

The wingspan is reported to be 22–26 mm. Adults are on wing from February to September.
