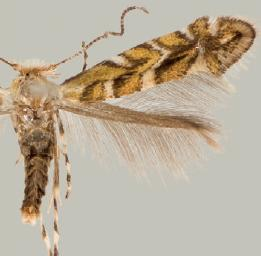
- Macrosaccus gliricidius

Scientific classification
- Kingdom: Animalia
- Phylum: Arthropoda
- Clade: Pancrustacea
- Class: Insecta
- Order: Lepidoptera
- Family: Gracillariidae
- Subfamily: Lithocolletinae
- Genus: Macrosaccus; Davis and De Prins, 2011

Type species
- Macrosaccus robiniella Clemens, 1859

Species
- See text

= Macrosaccus =

Genus of moths

Macrosaccus is a genus of moths in the family Gracillariidae.

== Etymology ==
The generic name is derived from the ancient Greek μακρο- (meaning long) and σάκκος (meaning bag) in reference to the elongate saccus in the male genitalia.

== Species ==
There are six species currently recognized:

- Macrosaccus coursetiae Eiseman & Davis, 2017
- Macrosaccus gliricidius Davis, 2011
- Macrosaccus morrisella (Fitch, 1859)
- Macrosaccus neomexicanus Davis, 2011
- Macrosaccus robiniella (Clemens, 1859)
- Macrosaccus uhlerella (Fitch, 1859)
