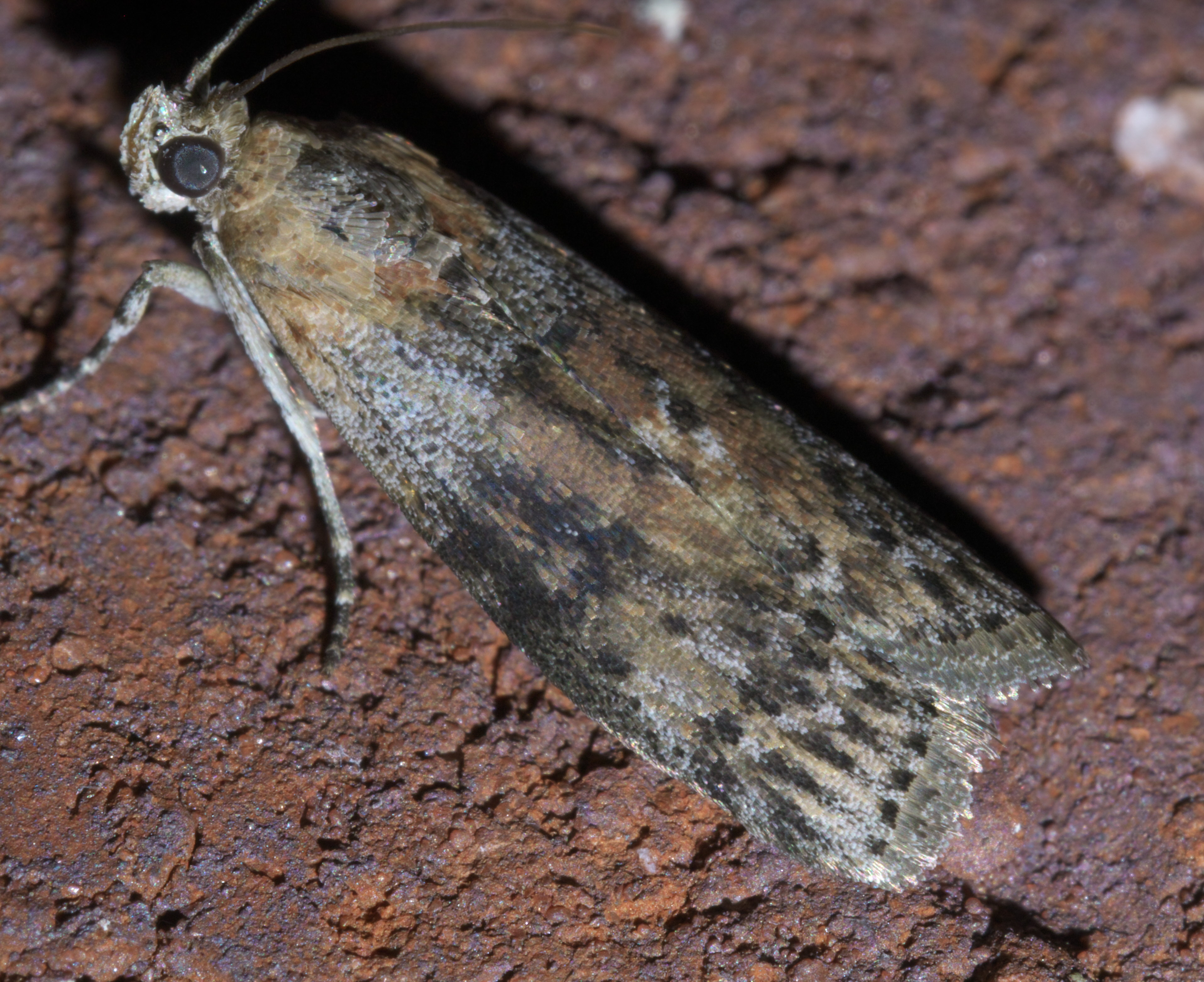

Scientific classification
- Domain: Eukaryota
- Kingdom: Animalia
- Phylum: Arthropoda
- Class: Insecta
- Order: Lepidoptera
- Family: Pyralidae
- Subfamily: Phycitinae
- Tribe: Phycitini
- Genus: Sciota; Hulst, 1888

Synonyms
- Apodentinodia Roesler, 1969; Clasperopsis Roesler, 1969; Paranephopterix Roesler, 1969; Denticera Amsel, 1961

= Sciota (moth) =

Genus of moth

Sciota is a genus of snout moths. It was described by George Duryea Hulst in 1888.

== Species ==
- Subgenus Clasperopsis Roesler, 1969
  - Sciota fumella (Eversmann, 1844)
  - Sciota lucipetella (Jalava, 1978)
- Subgenus Sciota Hulst, 1888
  - Sciota imperialella Ragonot, 1887
  - Sciota insignella (Mann, 1862)
  - Sciota ferruginella Zerny, 1914
  - Sciota rhenella (Zincken, 1818)
  - Sciota hostilis Stephens, 1834
- Subgenus Paranephopterix Roesler, 1969
  - Sciota adelphella Fischer von Röslerstamm, 1836
  - Sciota barteli (Caradja, 1910)
- Subgenus Denticera Amsel, 1961
  - Sciota divisella (Duponchel, 1842)

Subgenus unknown

  - Sciota basilaris (Zeller, 1872)
  - Sciota biareatella (Caradja, 1925)
  - Sciota bifasciella (Hulst, 1887)
  - Sciota bisra (Dyar, 1919)
  - Sciota carneella (Hulst, 1887)
  - Sciota celtidella (Hulst, 1890)
  - Sciota crassifasciella (Ragonot, 1887)
  - Sciota croceella Hulst, 1888
  - Sciota cynicella (Christoph, 1881)
  - Sciota dammersi (Heinrich, 1956)
  - Sciota delassalis (Hulst, 1886)
  - Sciota fernaldi (Ragonot, 1887)
  - Sciota furvicostella (Ragonot, 1893)
  - Sciota gilvibasella (Hulst, 1890)
  - Sciota inconditella (Ragonot, 1893)
  - Sciota marmorata (Alphéraky, 1876)
  - Sciota obscurella (Caradja in Caradja & Meyrick, 1937)
  - Sciota rubescentella (Hulst, 1900)
  - Sciota rubrisparsella (Ragonot, 1887)
  - Sciota rungsi Leraut, 2002
  - Sciota subcaesiella (Clemens, 1860)
  - Sciota subfuscella (Ragonot, 1887)
  - Sciota termitalis (Hulst, 1886)
  - Sciota umbrosella (Erschoff, 1877)
  - Sciota uvinella (Ragonot, 1887)
  - Sciota vetustella (Dyar, 1904)
  - Sciota virgatella (Clemens, 1860)

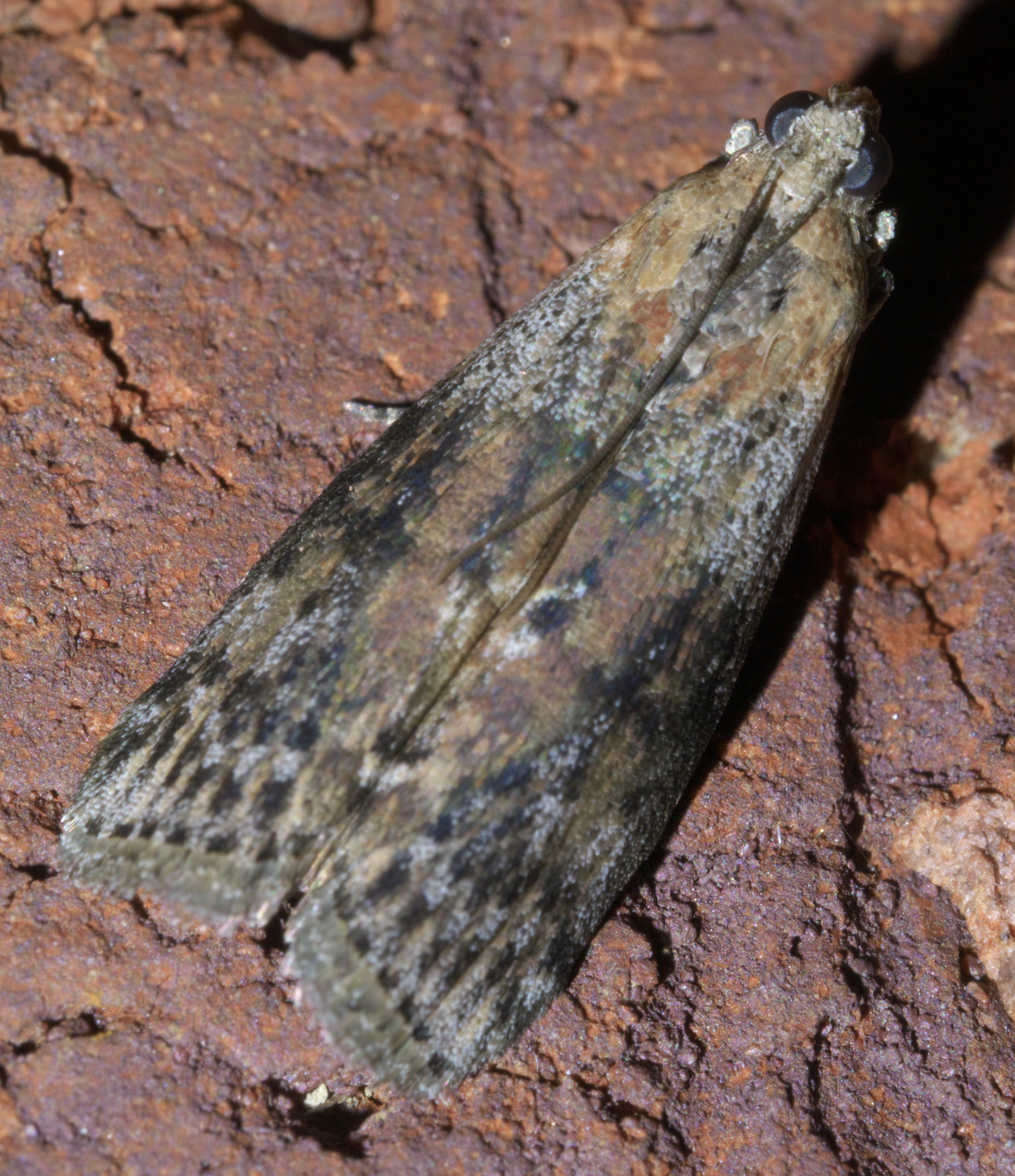
Sciota species
