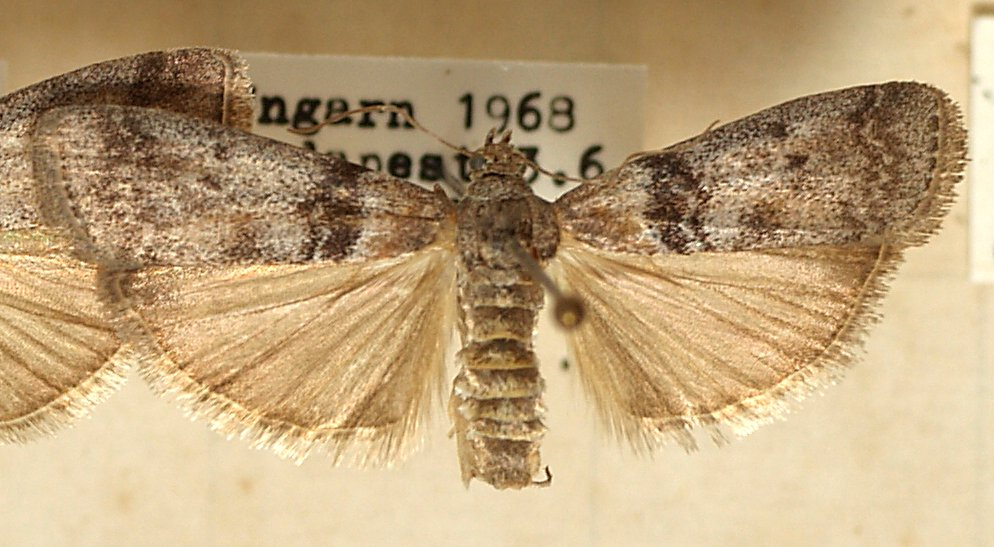

Scientific classification
- Domain: Eukaryota
- Kingdom: Animalia
- Phylum: Arthropoda
- Class: Insecta
- Order: Lepidoptera
- Family: Pyralidae
- Genus: Sciota
- Species: S. adelphella

Binomial name
- Sciota adelphella (Fischer von Röslerstamm, 1836)

Synonyms
- Phycis adelphella Fischer von Röslerstamm 1836; P. spissicella

= Sciota adelphella =

Species of moth

Sciota adelphella is a moth of the family Pyralidae. It was described by Josef Emanuel Fischer von Röslerstamm in 1836 and is found in Europe.

The wingspan is 20–24 mm. The moth flies in one generation from mid-June to August.

The caterpillars feed on Populus alba, Salix alba and Salix repens.

== Notes ==
1. The flight season refers to Belgium and the Netherlands. This may vary in other parts of the range.
