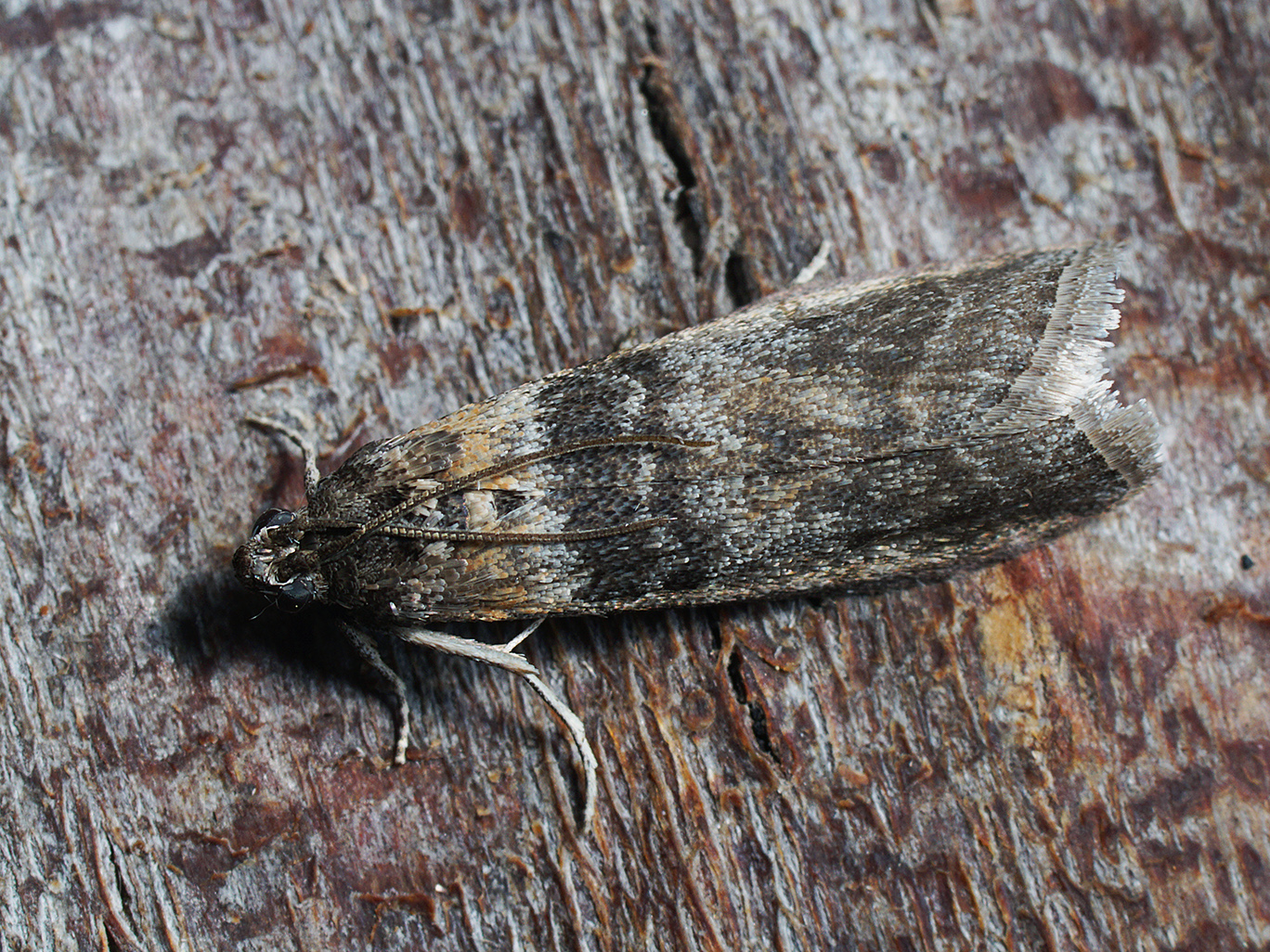

Scientific classification
- Kingdom: Animalia
- Phylum: Arthropoda
- Class: Insecta
- Order: Lepidoptera
- Family: Pyralidae
- Genus: Sciota
- Species: S. rhenella

Binomial name
- Sciota rhenella (Zincken, 1818)

Synonyms
- Phycis rhenella Zincken, 1818; Nephopteryx rhenella; Nephopteryx rhenella var. laetifica Ragonot, 1893

= Sciota rhenella =

Species of moth

Sciota rhenella is a moth of the family Pyralidae found in Europe. It was described by the German entomologist, Johann Leopold Theodor Friedrich Zincken in 1818. The caterpillars feed on poplars (Populus species).

== Notes ==
1. The flight season refers to Belgium and The Netherlands. This may vary in other parts of the range.
