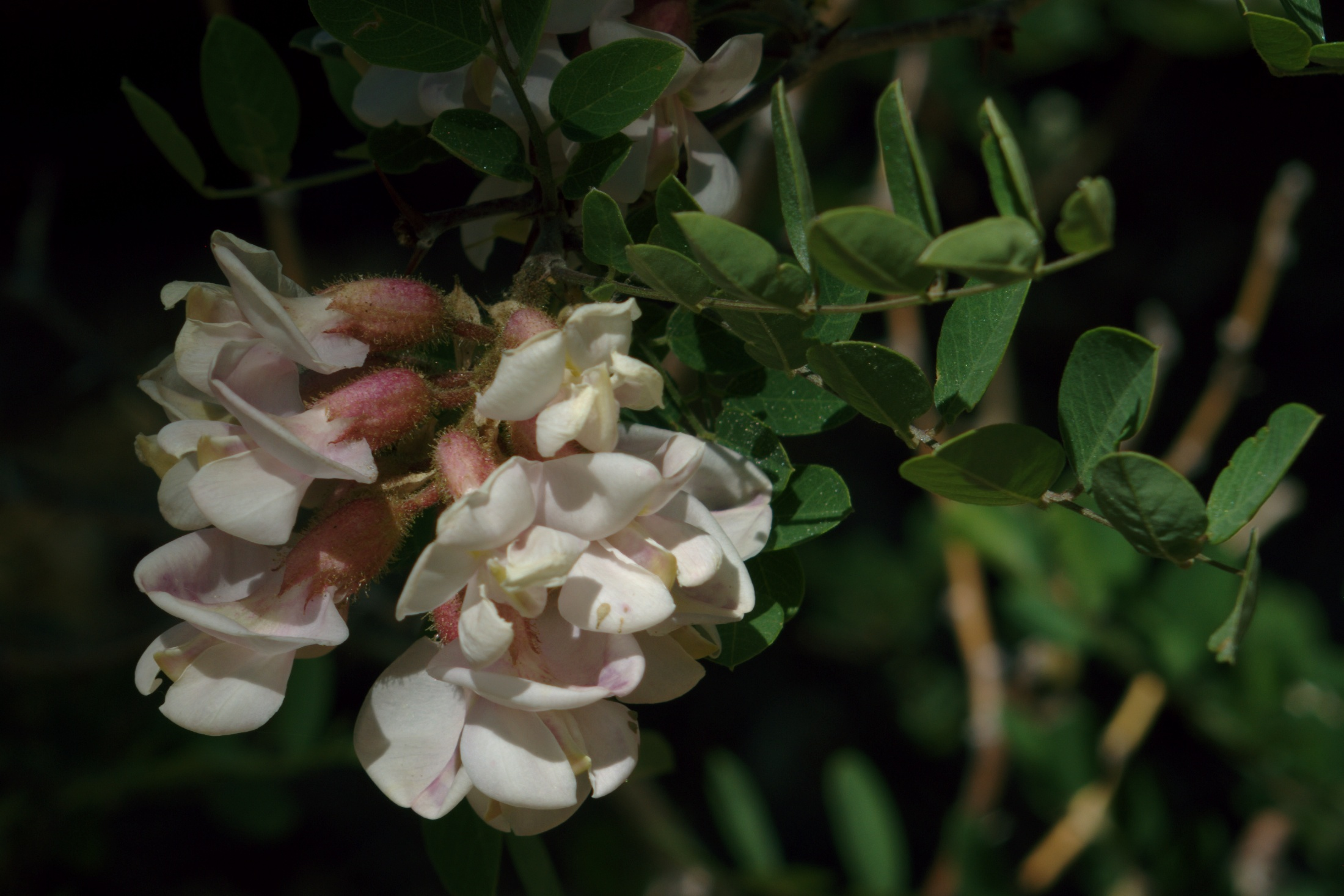

Conservation status
- Least Concern (IUCN 3.1)

- Apparently Secure (NatureServe)

Scientific classification
- Kingdom: Plantae
- Clade: Tracheophytes
- Clade: Angiosperms
- Clade: Eudicots
- Clade: Rosids
- Order: Fabales
- Family: Fabaceae
- Subfamily: Faboideae
- Genus: Robinia
- Species: R. neomexicana

Binomial name
- Robinia neomexicana A.Gray
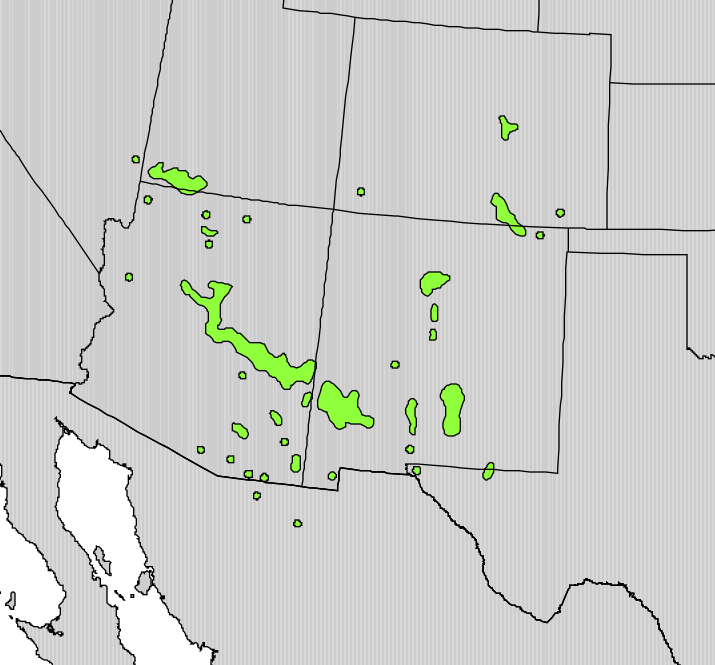
- Natural range

Synonyms
- List: Robinia breviloba Rydb. (1924); Robinia luxurians (Dieck) Silva Tar. & C.K.Schneid. (1922); Robinia neomexicana var. albiflora Kusche (1911); Robinia neomexicana var. luxurians Dieck (1892); Robinia neomexicana var. rusbyi (Wooton & Standl.) W.C.Martin & C.R.Hutchins ex Peabody (1984); Robinia neomexicana var. subvelutina (Rydb.) Kearney & Peebles (1939); Robinia rusbyi Wooton & Standl. (1913); Robinia subvelutina Rydb. (1924)

= Robinia neomexicana =

Plant species in the pea family

Robinia neomexicana, the New Mexican, New Mexico, Southwest, desert, pink, or rose locust, is a shrub or small tree in the subfamily Faboideae of the family Fabaceae.

== Distribution ==
Robinia neomexicana is native to the Southwestern United States (southeastern California and southwestern Utah, Virgin River region, east through Arizona and New Mexico, the Rio Grande valley, to far west Texas) and adjoining northern Mexico; from central New Mexico the range extends north into Colorado, mostly the eastern foothills of the Rocky Mountains. In Arizona, it ranges across the Arizona transition zone, the Mogollon Rim and White Mountains, and into western and southwestern New Mexico.

In California, it is uncommon below 1,500 m (4,900 ft) in canyons in the Mojave Desert and its sky island pinyon-juniper habitats (Pinus monophylla and Juniperus californica). Farther east, it is typically found between 1,200 and 2,600 meters (3,900 and 8,500 feet) along streams, in the bottoms of valleys, and on the sides of canyons.

== Description ==
Robinia neomexicana grows to 5–10 m tall (rarely to 15 m) with bristly shoots. The leaves are 10–15 cm long, pinnate with 7–15 leaflets; they have a pair of sharp, reddish-brown thorns at the base. The flowers are showy and white or pink, and considered fragrant. Blooms are produced in spring or early summer in dense racemes 5–10 cm long that hang from the branches near the ends. The fruits are brown bean-like pods with bristles like those on the shoots.

== Uses ==
In New Mexico, Pueblo Native Americans traditionally ate the flowers uncooked. The pods were also eaten raw and cooked by some Native Americans, such as the Mescalero and Chiricahua Apache.

Mule deer, cattle, and goats browse the plant foliage. Cattle also eat the plant's flowers. Squirrels and quail eat the locust's seeds.
