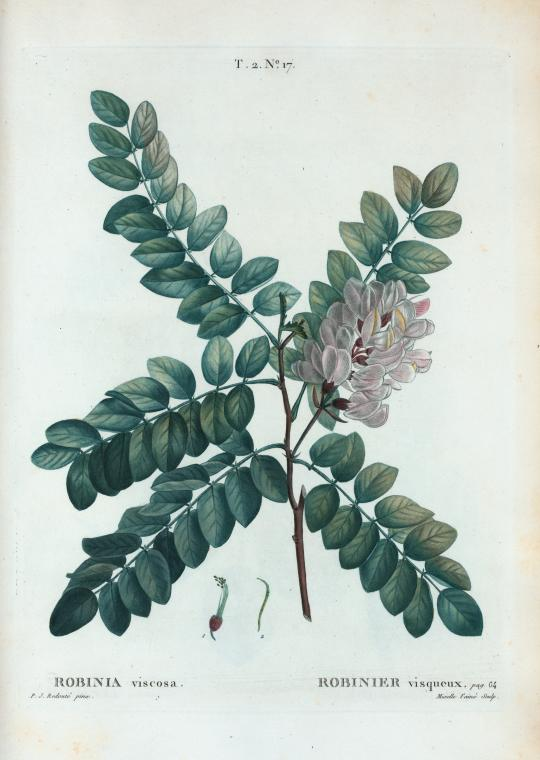

Scientific classification
- Kingdom: Plantae
- Clade: Tracheophytes
- Clade: Angiosperms
- Clade: Eudicots
- Clade: Rosids
- Order: Fabales
- Family: Fabaceae
- Subfamily: Faboideae
- Genus: Robinia
- Species: R. viscosa

Binomial name
- Robinia viscosa L.

= Robinia viscosa =

Species of plant native to North America

Robinia viscosa, commonly known in its native territory as clammy locust, is a medium-sized deciduous tree native to the southeastern United States.
