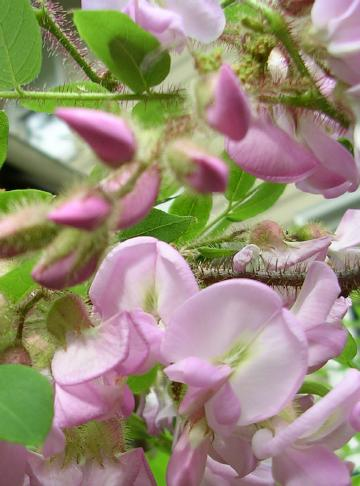

Conservation status
- Apparently Secure (NatureServe)

Scientific classification
- Kingdom: Plantae
- Clade: Tracheophytes
- Clade: Angiosperms
- Clade: Eudicots
- Clade: Rosids
- Order: Fabales
- Family: Fabaceae
- Subfamily: Faboideae
- Genus: Robinia
- Species: R. hispida

Binomial name
- Robinia hispida L.

Synonyms
- List: Aeschynomene hispida Roxb. ex Steud. publ.; Pseudo-acacia hispida (L.) Moench (1794); Robinia albicans Ashe (1923); Robinia boyntonii Ashe (1898); Robinia complexa K.Koch (1869); Robinia elliottii (Chapm.) Ashe (1903); Robinia fertilis Ashe (1923); Robinia glabrescens Hoffmanns. (1828); Robinia hirsuta Lindem. (1880); Robinia hispida var. boyntonii Ashe (1897); Robinia hispida var. elliottii Chapm. (1860); Robinia hispida var. fertilis (Ashe) R.T.Clausen (1940); Robinia hispida var. inermis G.Kirchn. (1864); Robinia hispida var. kelseyi (Cowell ex Hutch.) Isely (1982); Robinia hispida var. macrophylla DC. (1825); Robinia hispida f. macrophylla (DC.) Voss (1894); Robinia hispida var. nana (Elliott) DC. (1825); Robinia hispida var. rosea Pursh (1813); Robinia hispida f. rosea (Pursh) Voss (1894); Robinia hispida var. typica R.T.Clausen (1940); Robinia kelseyi Cowell ex Hutch. (1908); Robinia leucantha Rehder (1945); Robinia macrophylla (DC.) Schrad. ex G.Don (1832); Robinia michauxii Sarg. (1922); Robinia montana W.Bartram ex Pursh (1813); Robinia nana Elliott (1823); Robinia pallida Ashe (1923); Robinia pauciflora Ashe (1923); Robinia pedunculata Ashe (1923); Robinia rosea Loisel. (1812); Robinia speciosa Ashe (1922); Robinia unakae Ashe (1923)

= Robinia hispida =

Plant species in the pea family

Robinia hispida, known as the bristly locust, rose-acacia, or moss locust, is a shrub in the subfamily Faboideae of the pea family Fabaceae. It is native to the southeastern United States, and it is present in other areas, including other regions of North America, as an introduced species. It is grown as an ornamental and can escape cultivation and grow in the wild.

== Description ==
This deciduous shrub grows to 3 m (9.8 ft) tall, often with glandular, bristly (hispid) stems. The leaves are pinnate with up to 13 leaflets. The pink or purplish pealike flowers are borne in hanging racemes of up to five. The fruit is a flat pod. The variety of this species, called ambatch which is found in Cuba, has notably low density wood, about 40 kg/m^{3} (2.5 lb/cu ft); about one-third the density of balsa wood (Ochroma lagopus).

== Ethnobotany ==
The Cherokee had several uses for the plant. They used the root medicinally for toothache. They fed an infusion of the plant to cows as a tonic. The wood was useful for making fences, bows, and blowgun darts, and for building houses.

== Subtaxa ==
There are at least 5 varieties:

- Robinia hispida var. fertilis - Arnot bristly locust (North Carolina, Tennessee)
- Robinia hispida var. hispida - Common bristly locust (Originally endemic to the Southern Appalachian Mountains but now escaped from cultivation throughout much of eastern North America)
- Robinia hispida var. kelseyi - Kelsey's locust (North Carolina, sometimes considered to have arisen as a horticultural variety, sometimes considered a distinct species)
- Robinia hispida var. nana - Dwarf bristly locust (Found in the Piedmont and Coastal Plain from North Carolina south to Alabama, typically in dry, sandy soils such as those in the Sandhills region; sometimes considered a distinct species as R. nana)
- Robinia hispida var. rosea - Boynton's locust (North Carolina, Tennessee, South Carolina, Georgia, Alabama)
