= Saint-Julien-le-Pauvre =

Melkite Greek Catholic church in Paris, France

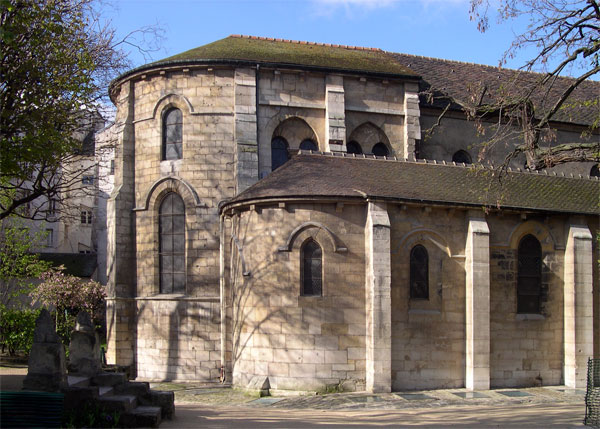
- Saint-Julien--Le-Pauvre, Paris

Religion
- Affiliation: Catholic Church
- Province: Archdiocese of Paris
- Rite: Melkite Greek

Location
- Location: 5th arrondissement, Paris
- Interactive map of Saint-Julien-le-Pauvre
- Coordinates: 48°51′7.5″N 2°20′49.5″E

Architecture
- Type: Church
- Style: Romanesque
- Completed: 13th century

Saint-Julien-le-Pauvre, in full Église Saint-Julien-le-Pauvre (French for Church of Saint Julian the Poor), is a Melkite Greek Catholic parish church in Paris, France, and one of the city's oldest religious buildings. Begun in Romanesque style during the 12th century, most of its architecture is Primary Gothic. It is in the 5th arrondissement, on the left bank of the Seine River, about 500 meters away from the Musée de Cluny and not far from the Maubert-Mutualité Paris Métro station. It shares a city block with the Square René Viviani.

Originally a Latin Catholic place of worship, Saint-Julien-le-Pauvre was built in stages from the 12th to the 19th centuries, and was granted to the Eastern Catholic Melkite community in 1889. The 12th-century design for the building was revised several times during the construction process, and the church is significantly smaller in size than originally planned.

== Name ==
The church was dedicated to two medieval French saints of the same name: Julian of Le Mans and a figure from the region of Dauphiné. "The poor" describes the modesty of the building, which makes it look very compact, compared with the contemporary cathedrals of the same style in the same region of Île-de-France.

== History ==
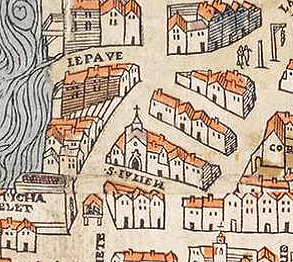
The church on the map of Paris (1550)

Saint-Julien-le-Pauvre replaced a 6th-century oratory dedicated to Saint Julien de Broude, which was part of a Merovingian hospice which sheltered pilgrims without funds.

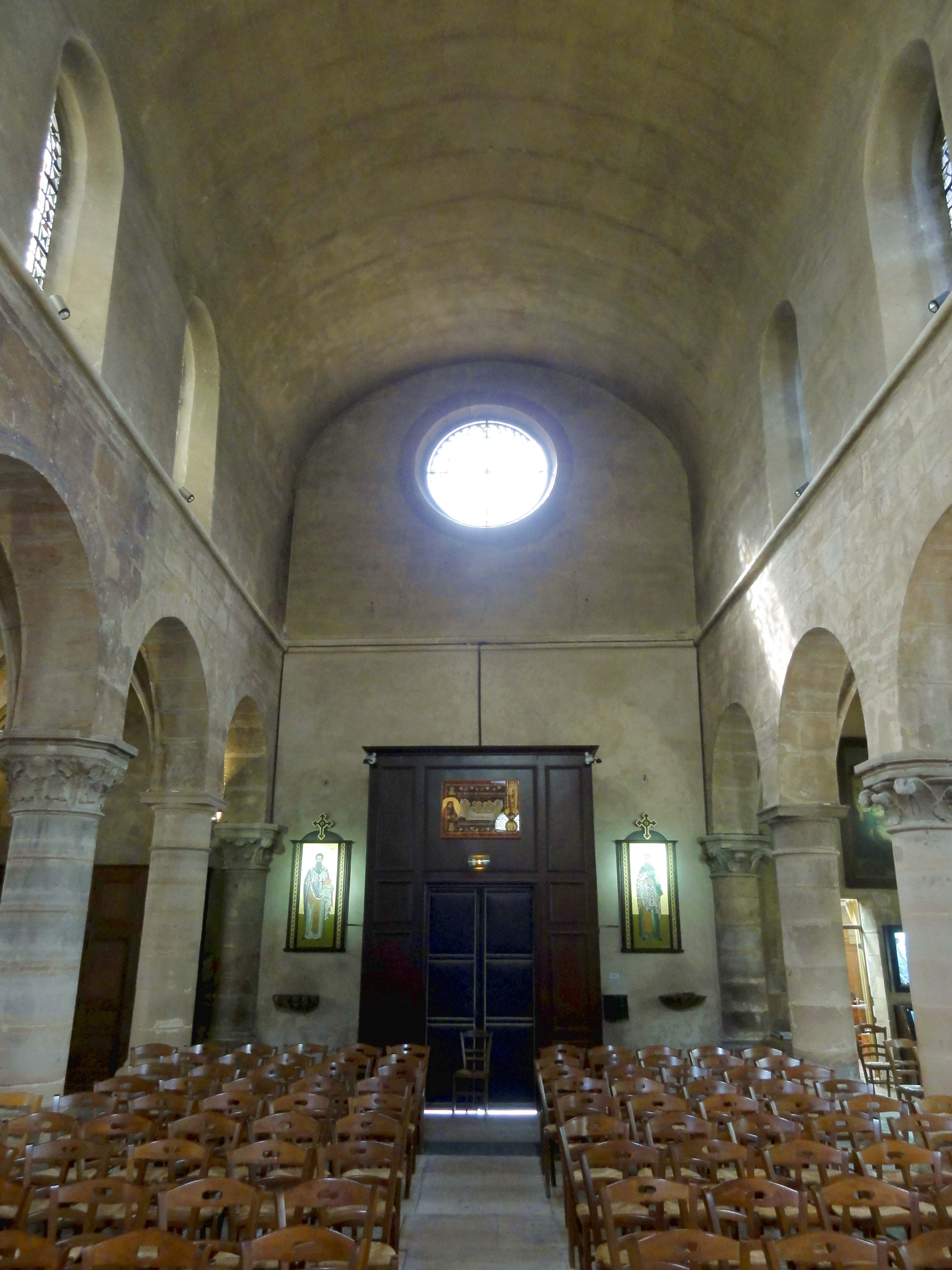
Nave with Romanesque arcades but a post-medieval cross section of the barrel vault

The earliest mention of such a site was found in texts authored by Gregory, bishop of Tours, who resided there in the 6th century during the rule of Chilperic I, king of Neustria. A synagogue serving the Jewish residents, probably the oldest in the city, was located in its environs. The buildings were badly damaged in the 9th century during the Norman invasion. In about 1120 the building was ceded to the monks of Clunisian order from the Abbey of Longpoint. It first took the name of Julian of Le Mans, the first bishop of Mans, then later was dedicated to Saint Julian the Hospitaller.

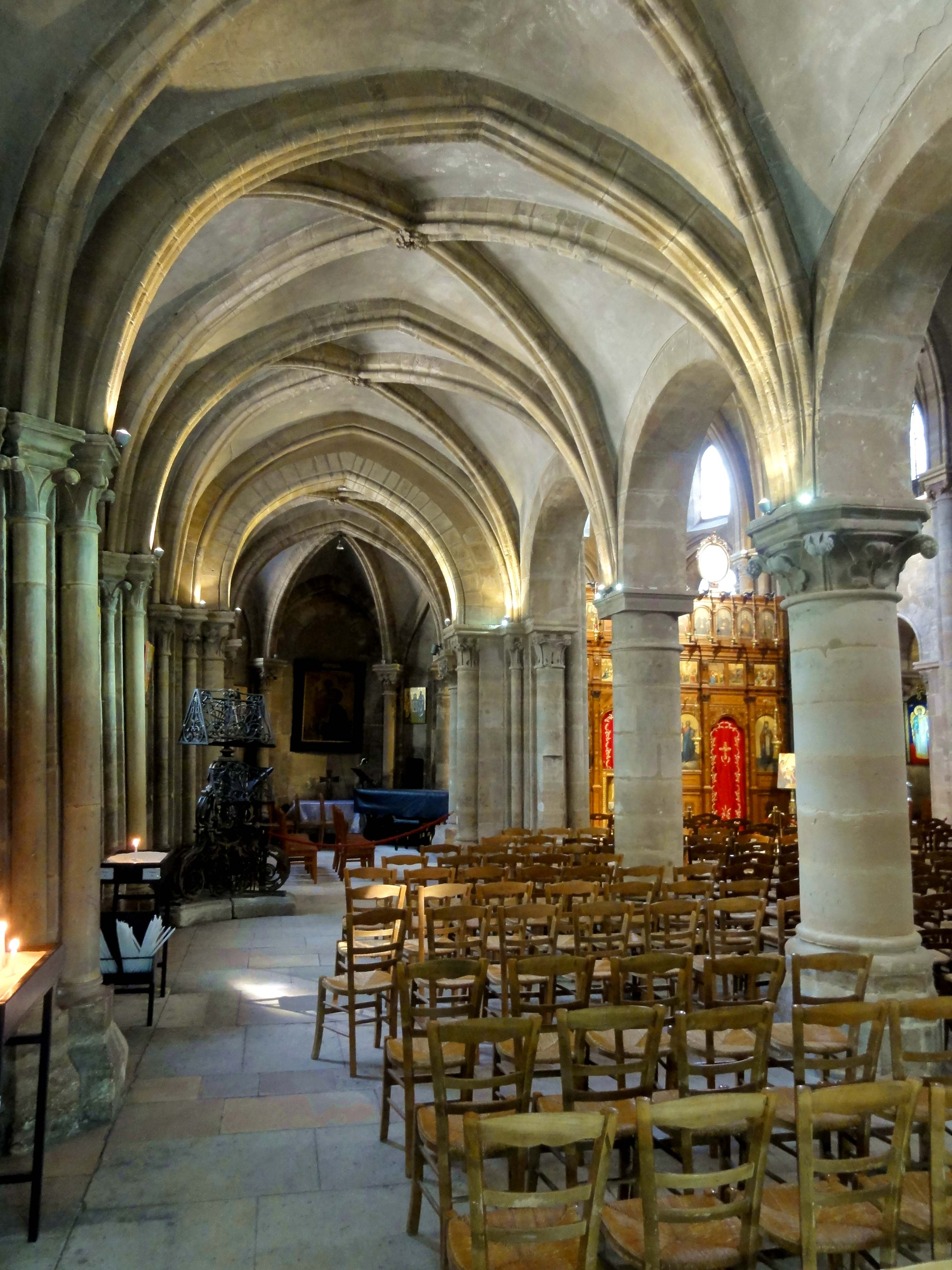
North aisle, Gothic rib vaults behind Romanesque arcades

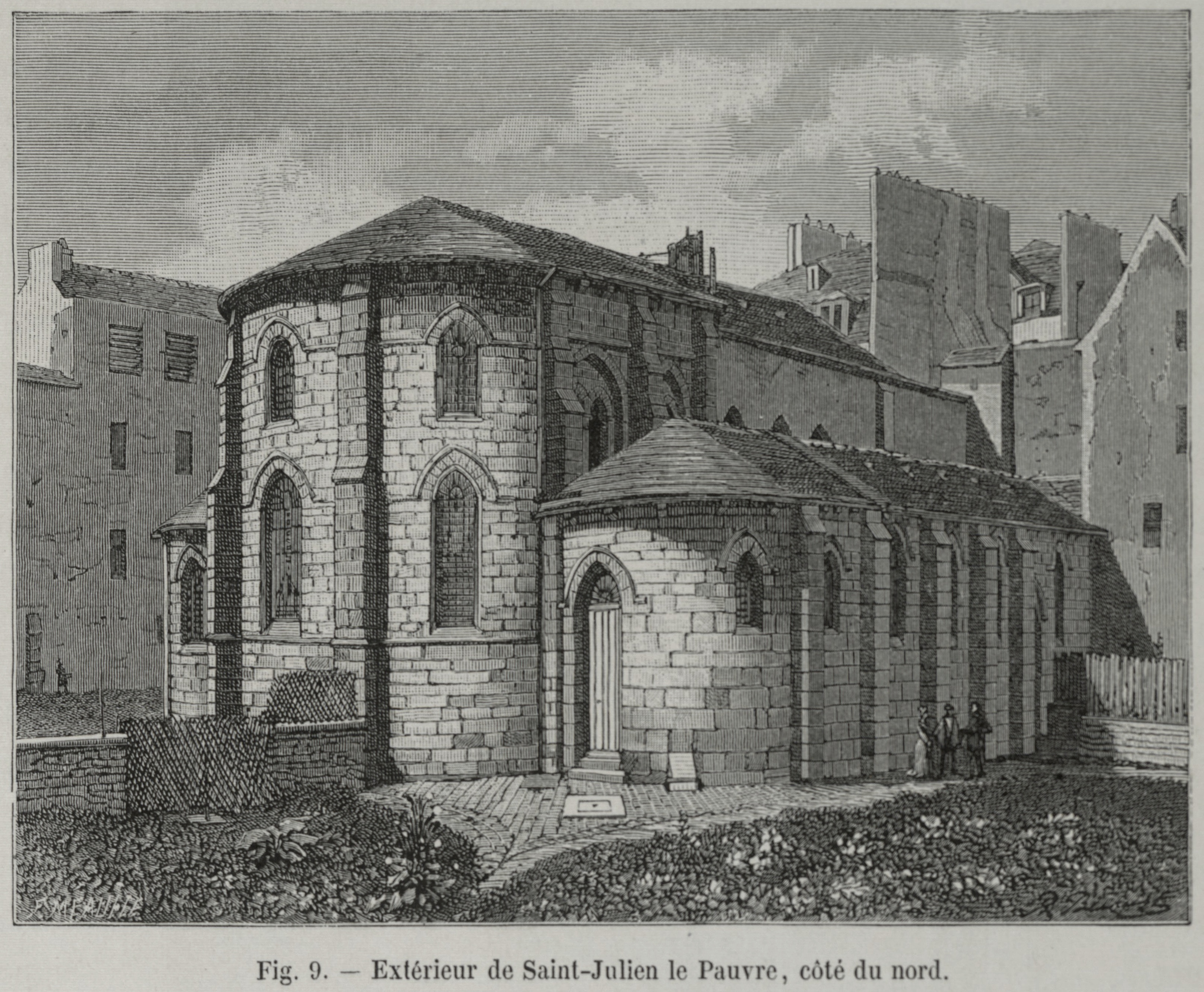
The church in the 1870s

The new church was begun between 1165 and 1170 upon the foundations of the older church. It was built under King Louis VII, the founder of the University of Paris, and of Notre-Dame de Paris. It is thirty years younger than the Saint Pierre de Montmartre church, the construction of the famous Gothic ambulatory of the Basilica of Saint-Denis lay between them. It was inspired by the contemporary Notre Dame de Paris. The building effort was supported by the Clunaic monastic community of Longpont. Their enterprise resulted in the completion of the choir and, most likely, the nave (ca. 1210–1220).

Saint-Julien-le-Pauvre was begun during the creation of Gothic style under the rule of King Louis the Younger, showing that the same principles of a style, under different economical conditions, can have different outcomes. The only one of the city's twelfth-century parish churches to have endured, it was never completed in its original design: the choir area was intended to be three stories high, and the clerestory is an incomplete triforium; the nave was supposed to be covered by sexpartite vaults, which were replaced by a wooden roof and, after the 17th century, by a new system of vaults; and, of a tower meant to stand on the church's southern side, only the staircase was begun. The eastern apses use material from an older building.

The church was closely associated with the nearby School of the Cathedral of Notre-Dame, and then University of Paris, or Sorbonne College whose charter was confirmed by the Pope in 1215. For three centuries the parishioners of the church included the students and the eminent scholars of the university, including Dante and Thomas Aquinas, and the church was used as the meeting place for college assemblies.

In the 17th century Cardinal Richelieu transferred the Sorbonne to a new campus and built a new chapel. the Saint Julien church entered a long decline. The upper part of the nave was rebuilt, using a non-Romanesque cross section of the barrel vault. The two western bays in the nave were demolished, and a northwestern facade was added. The northern aisle was preserved with its Gothic rib vaults, and two of its bays serve as a sacristy. In 1655 the church was downgraded to the status of a simple parish church.

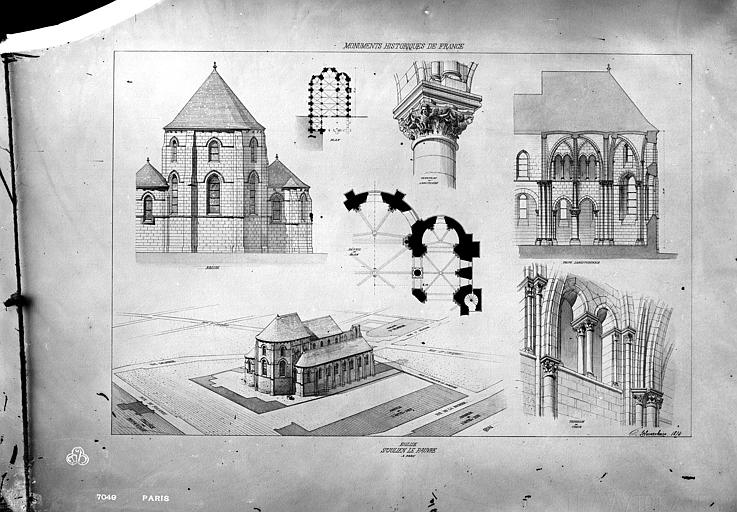
Views of the church in the 19th century

During the French Revolution, the church was closed and building was used as a storage depot for salt. It was listed for demolition, and suffered more damage as a result. The building was not returned to the Catholic Church until 1826. It underwent restoration under the direction of architect Franz Christian Gau.

In 1889 the church was assigned to the worshippers of the Melkite Greek Catholic Church, dependent upon the Patriarch of Antioch. The boiling was modified, with the addition of icons and an iconostasis between the choir and nave, the accommodate the new worshippers.

=== The Dada performance piece ===
On April 14, 1921, Saint-Julien-le-Pauvre was a venue for one of the last major performance art experiments in the history of the Dada avant-garde trend. Deemed a "Dada excursion", the event involved writers Tristan Tzara, André Breton, Philippe Soupault, as well as artist Francis Picabia. The group printed a pamphlet which read: "Today, at 15:00 hours, in the garden of St-Julien-le-Pauvre church, Dada [...] extends a free invitation to its friends and enemies to join it in visiting the church's buildings. It will not be an anticlerical demonstration, as one would be inclined to believe, but rather a new interpretation of nature applied this time not to art, but to life." As they distributed copies, they shouted insulting or provocative slogans to passers-by: "Be dirty!... One must trim his nose as one trims his hair!... One must wash her breasts like she washes facecloths..."

The "Dada excursion", conceived as a manner to revive the public's awareness of Dada, failed to gain needed attention, and, together with a mock trial of reactionary writer Maurice Barrès held later in the year, helped create a rift between Tzara's group and the future Surrealists Breton and Picabia.

== Exterior ==
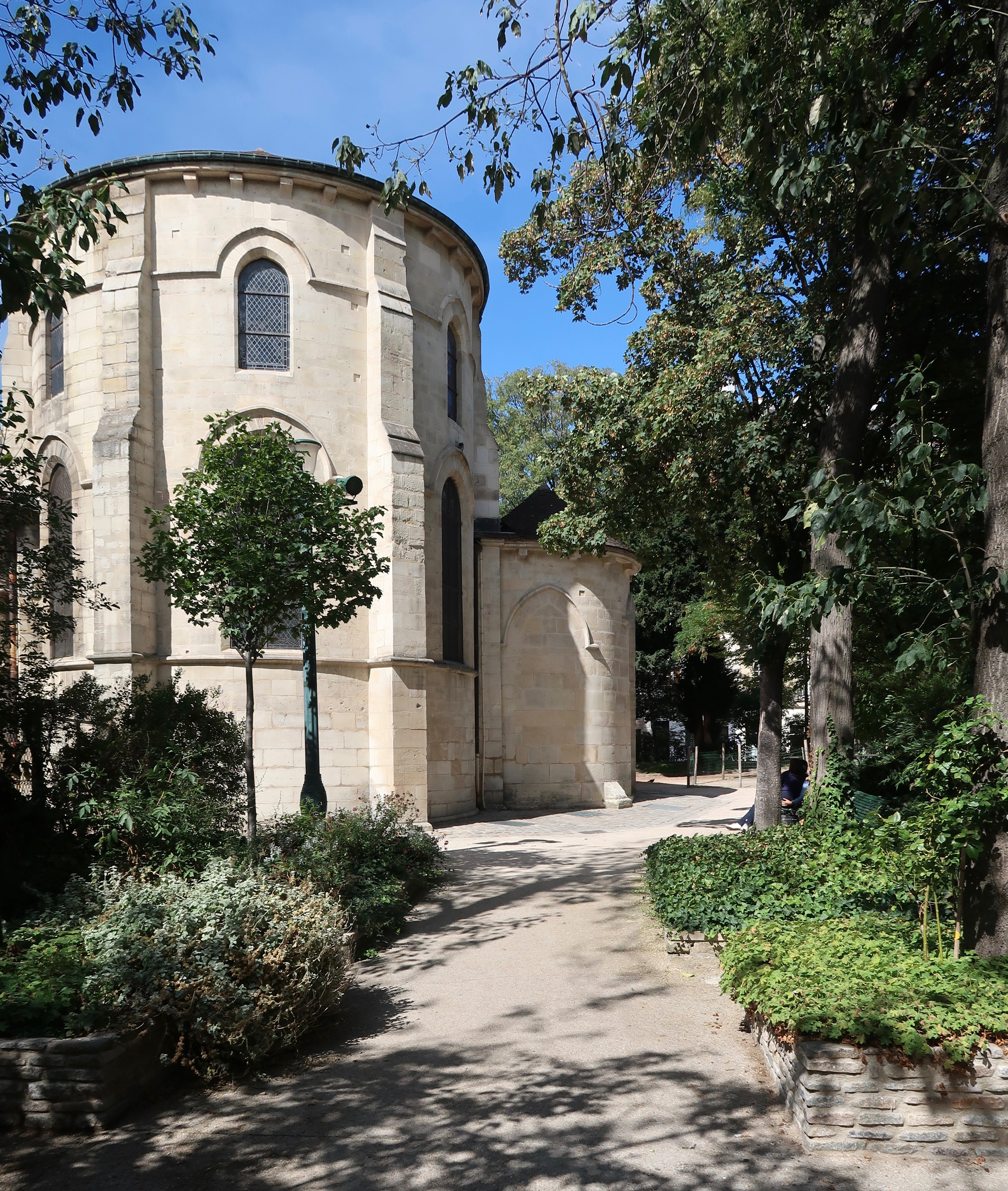
The Early Gothic chevet on Place Viviani

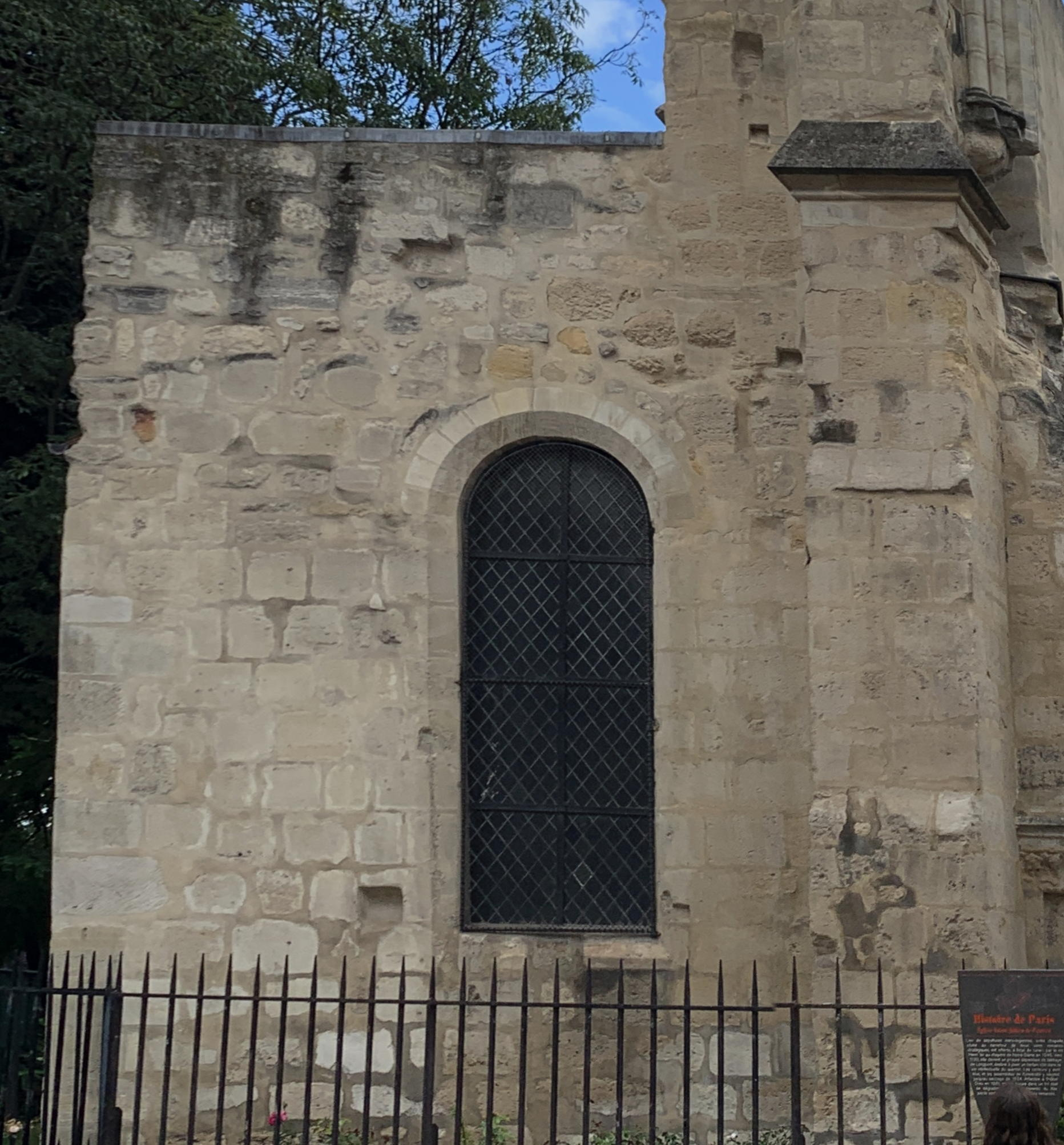
Western window of the aisle, renewed arch probably replacing a pointed arch

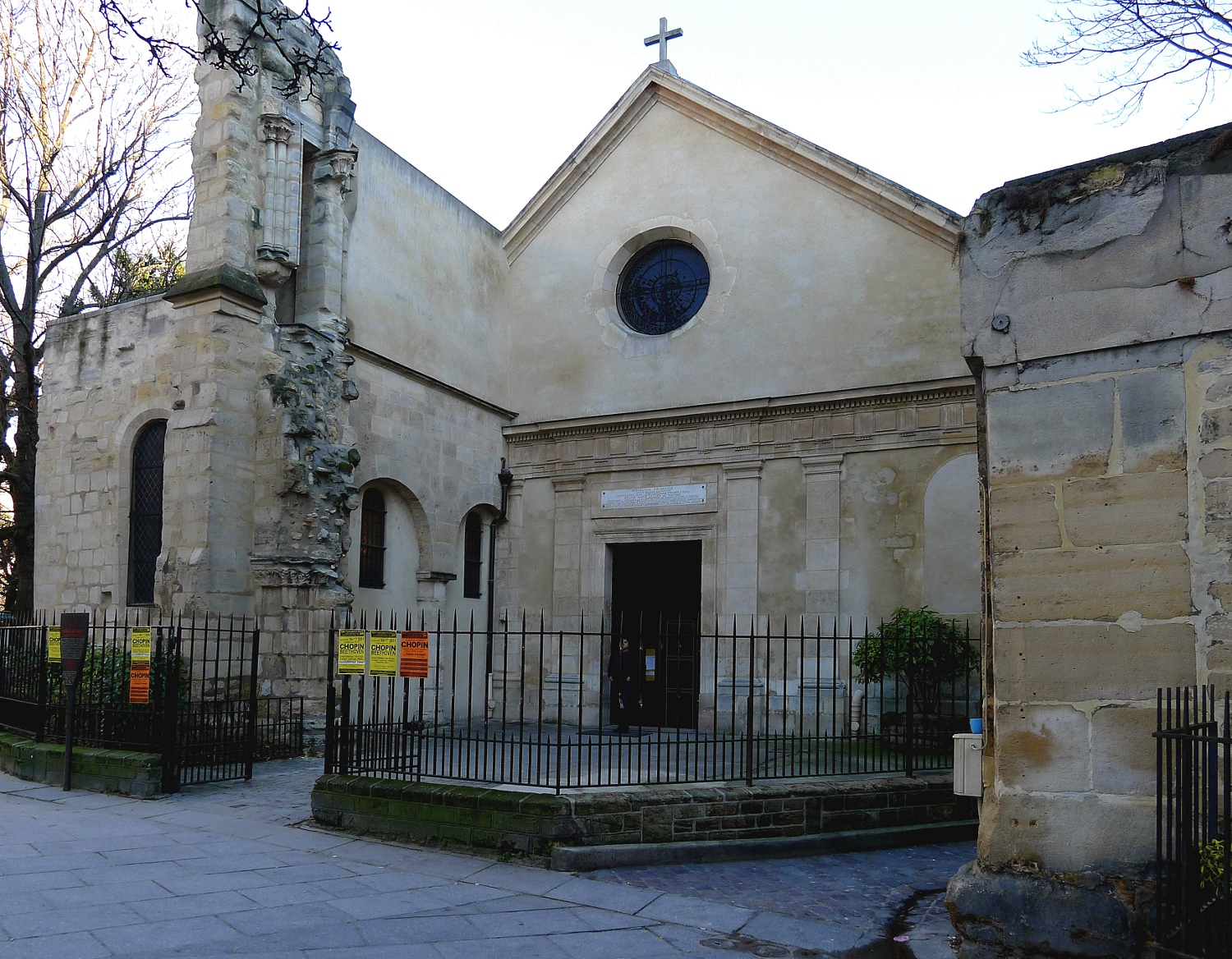
Neoclassical west front and remains of the medieval aisle

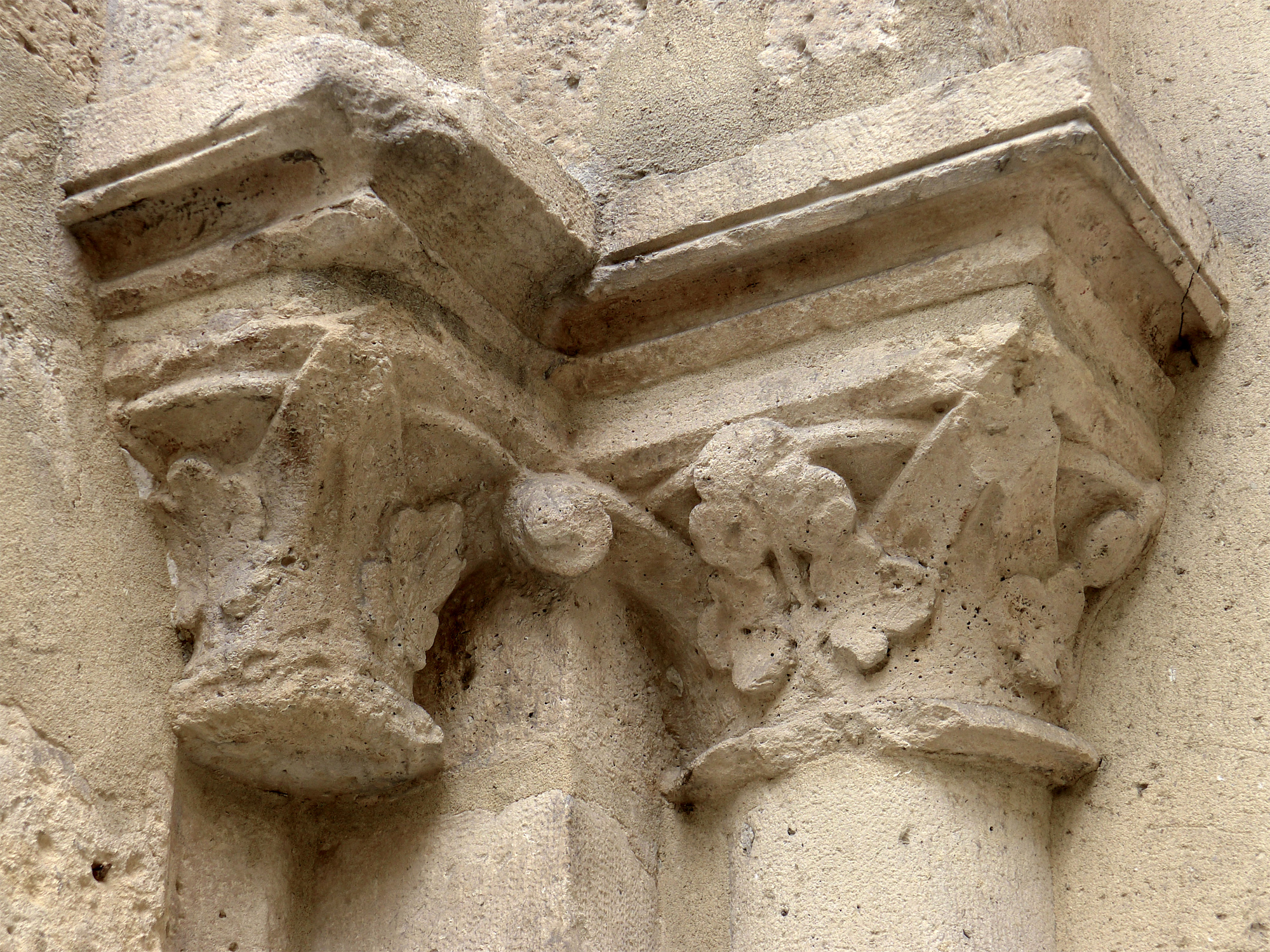
Early Gothic column capitals

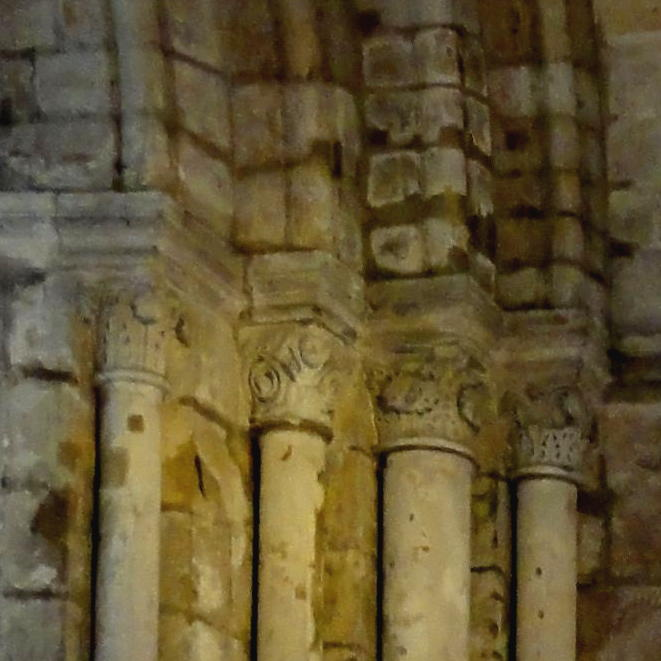
Reference: capitals of the ambulatory of Saint-Denis

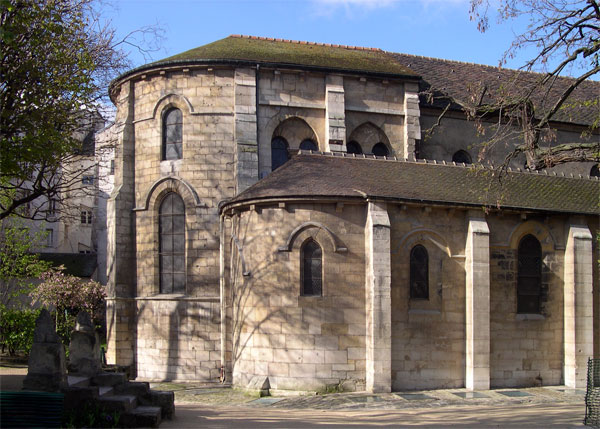
Chevet and buttresses of 12th century

The west front of the church varies by 30 degrees from true west, about the same variation as Notre Dame dw Paris; probably both churches were aligned to face the setting sun in mid-summer. Some of the original columns and columns from the early Primary Gothic church, with typical vegetal sculpture, are still visible near the west front. The (closed) arcade is Romanesque, possibly even a relic from before 1160. The remaining western window has been renewed, the surroundings suggest an older pointed arch, apt to the Gothic vaults of the aisle inside. Vestiges of the gallery of the west facade are also still visible, as well as the rows of buttresses from the 12th century which still support the outer walls of the nave.

== Interior ==
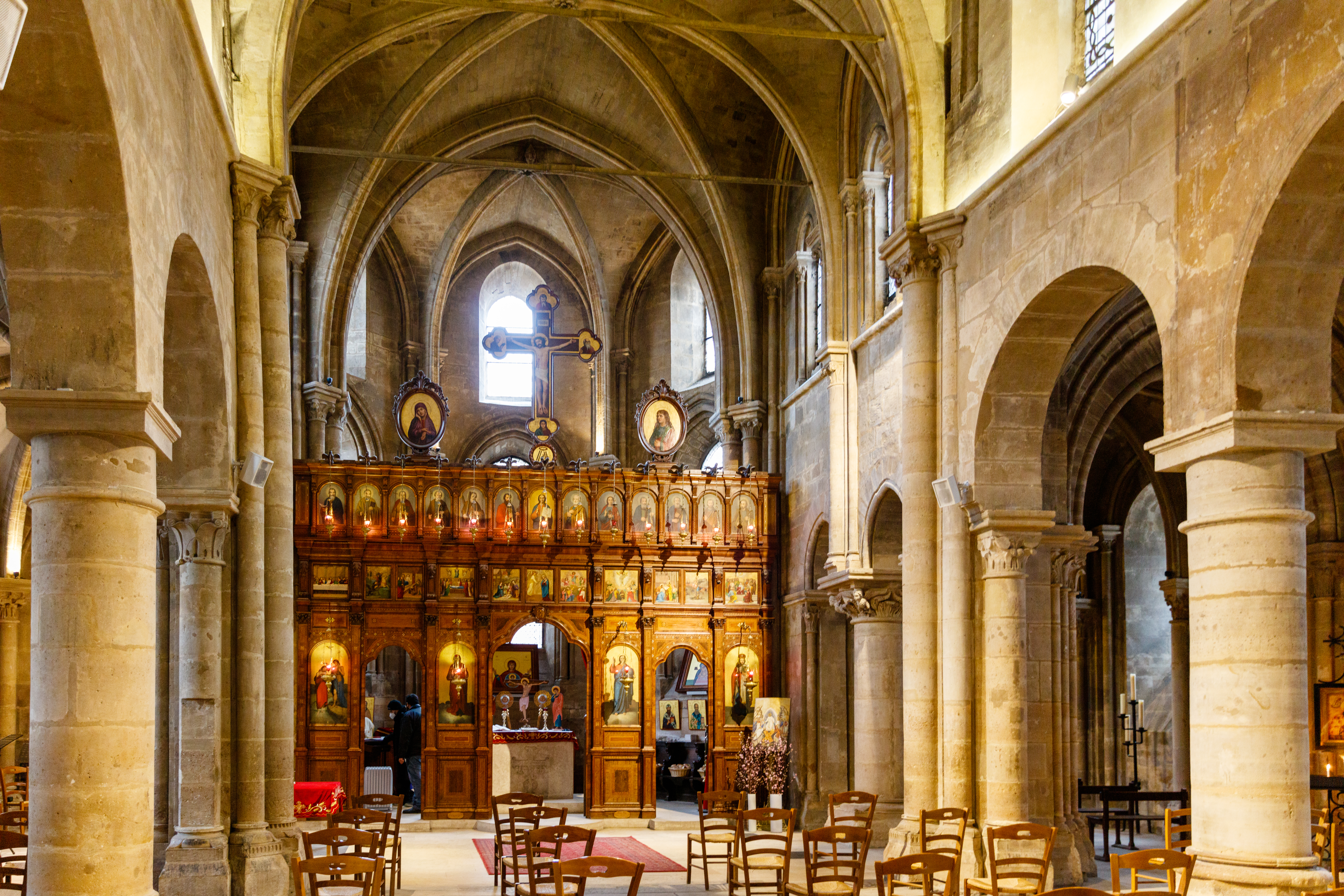
Interior and iconostasis between the nave and choir

Column capital with sculpture of a harpy, half-woman and half-bird

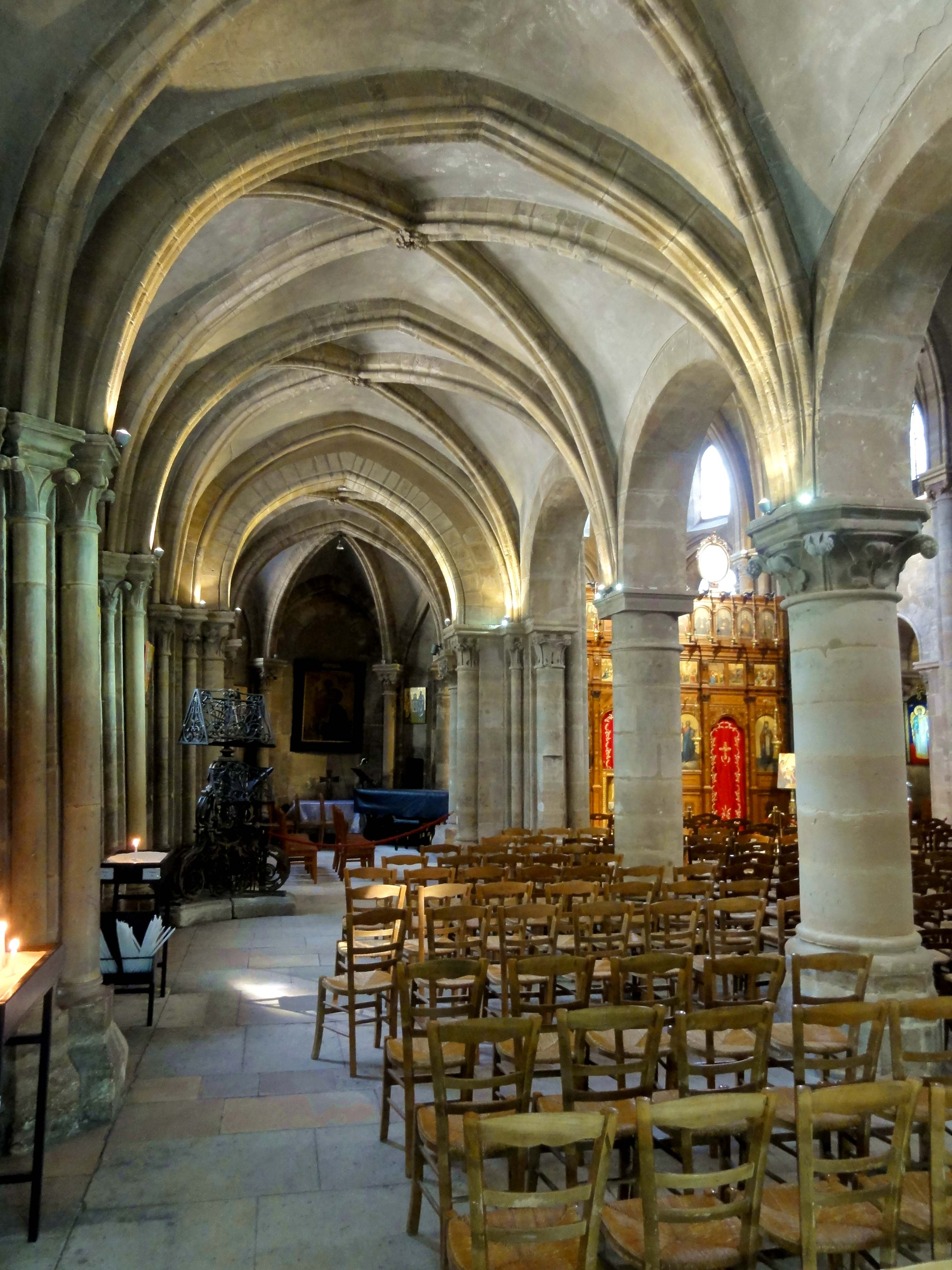
Lower aisle on the north side, looking east

The influence of Notre-Dame-de-Paris, built at the same time, is visible in the architecture of the interior of the church, particularly in the vaults and the columns and pillars in the nave and choir. The 13th-century nave is flanked by two lower aisles. and lined with arcades of columns supporting pointed arches. The columns have capitals decorated with sculpted water lilies and other aquatic plants. The choir is older (12th century) and is a good example of the early Gothic style. It is covered with early six-part rib vaults, while the nave has the simpler, stronger four-part vaults. One 12th century column is decorated with sculptures of harpies, mythical half-woman, half-bird creatures popular in Romanesque architecture.

The interior of the church underwent extensive modification in the 19th century to adapt it to its role as a church of the Greek Melkite Catholic Church. These include the addition of an iconostasis and icons; the removal of statues, with the exception of one statue from the earlier Roman church; and the removal of the church organ. The iconostasis symbolizes the border between the nave, the human, visible world, and the sanctuary, the imvisible, sacred world. The current iconostasis was created in 1890 of carved woodwork by Georges BItar, an artist from Damascus.

== Art and Decoration ==
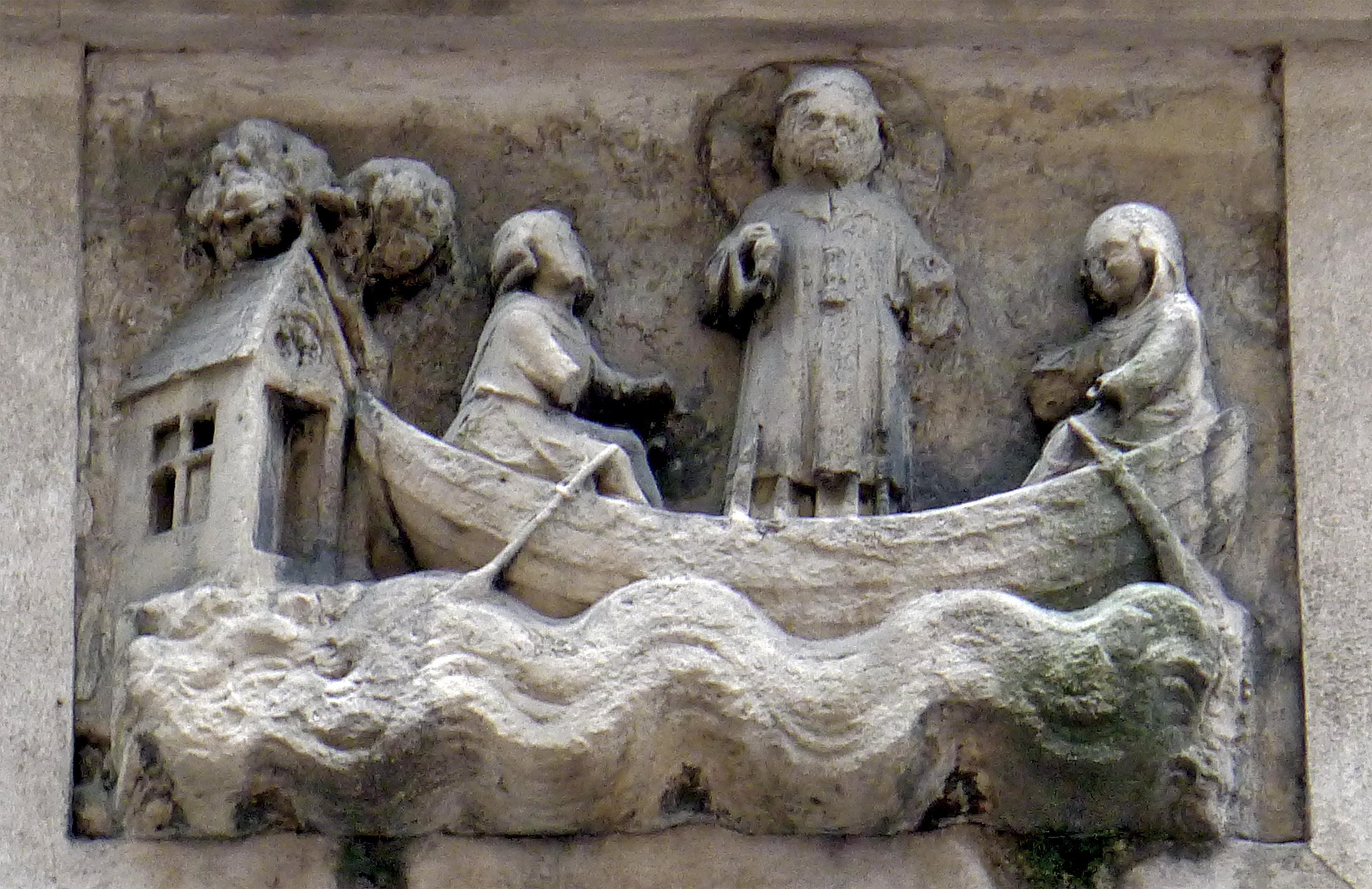
A bas-relief of St. Julien from the church (c. 1380), now at 42 rue Galande

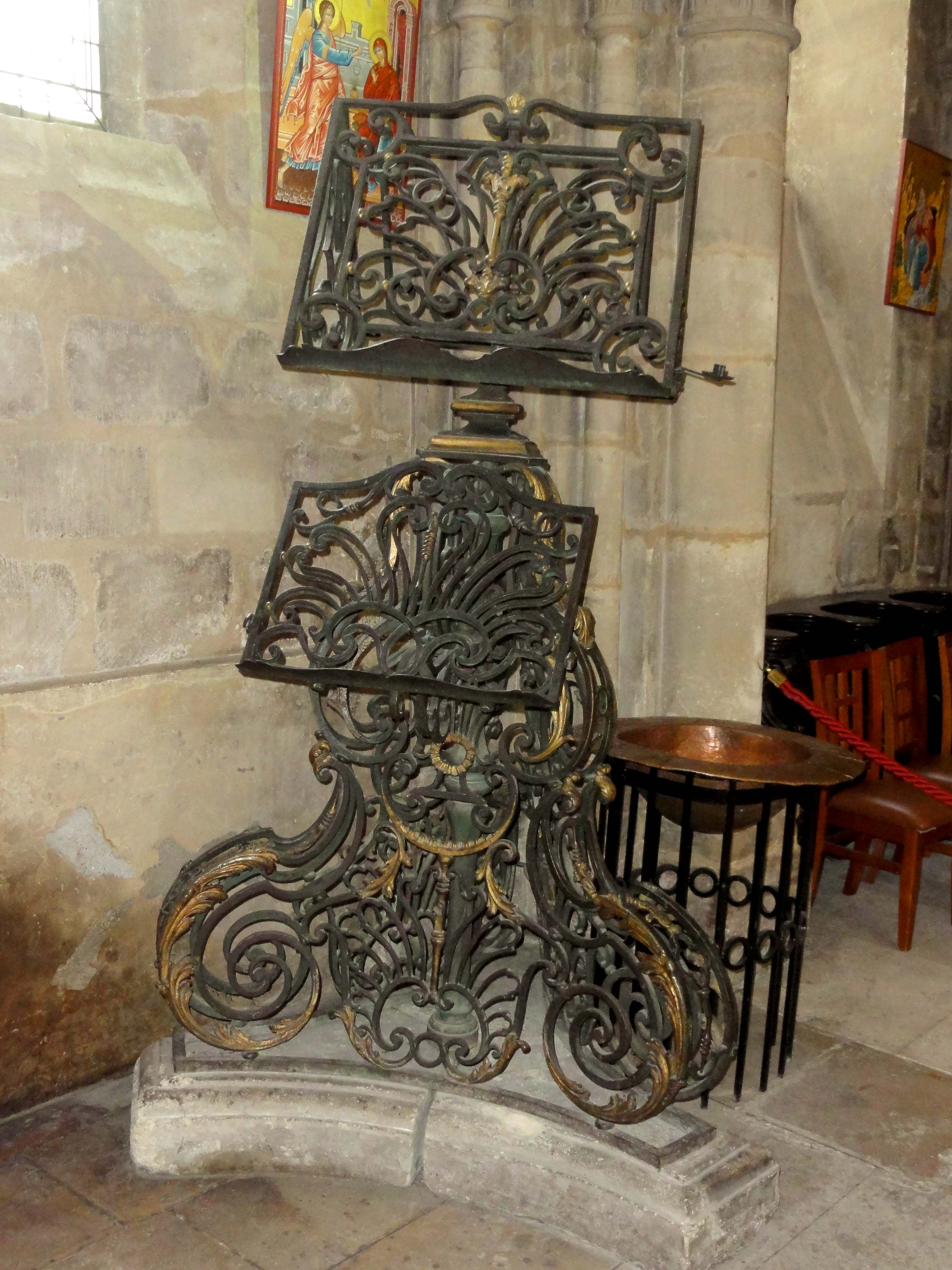
A lectern of forged iron (Louis XIV period) originally from Bicêtre Hospital

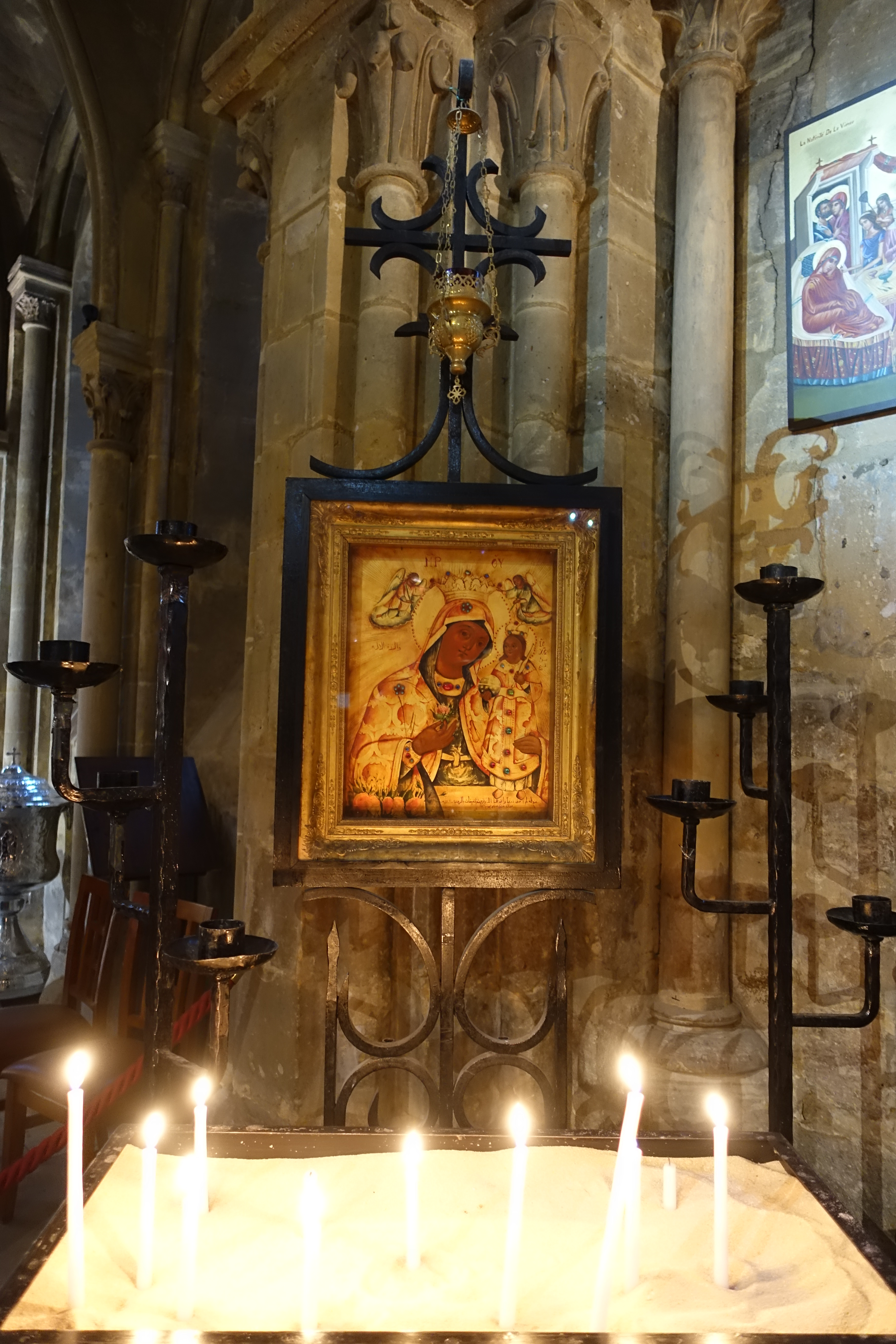
Icons

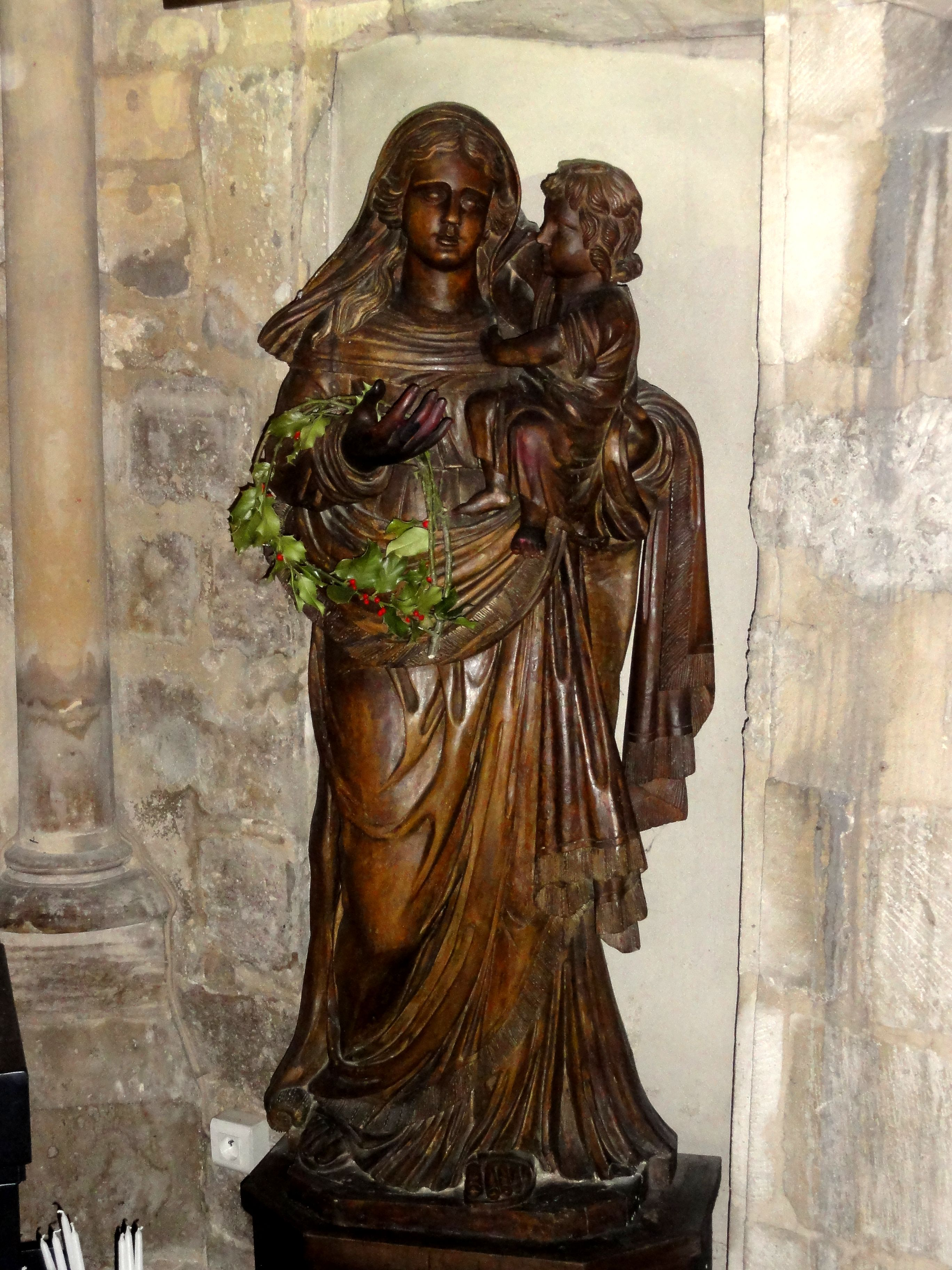
Carved statue of Virgin Mary and Child (17th century)

The building has piers replicating those found in Notre Dame, and the chapiters are carved with images of leaves and harpies. The choir area is covered by an iconostasis.

North of the church, in the Square René Viviani, is found the oldest tree in Paris. It is a locust tree planted in 1602 by Jean Robin, gardener-in-chief during the reign of kings Henry III, Henry IV, and Louis XIII. Also known as the "Lucky Tree of Paris", it is thought to bring years of good luck to those who gently touch the tree's bark.

== See also ==
- List of historic churches in Paris

== Bibliography ==
- Dumoulin, Aline; Ardisson, Alexandra; Maingard, Jérôme; Antonello, Murielle; Églises de Paris (2010), Éditions Massin, Issy-Les-Moulineaux, ISBN 978-2-7072-0683-1
- Lecompte, Francis and Ladoux, Bernard, "Paris Rive Gauche – Quartier Latin, St, Germain des Prés, Montparnasse – Les Essentials du Patrimoine", Éditions Massin, Paris, ISBN 978-2-7072-0870-5
