= Locust of Square René-Viviani =

Locust of square René-Viviani
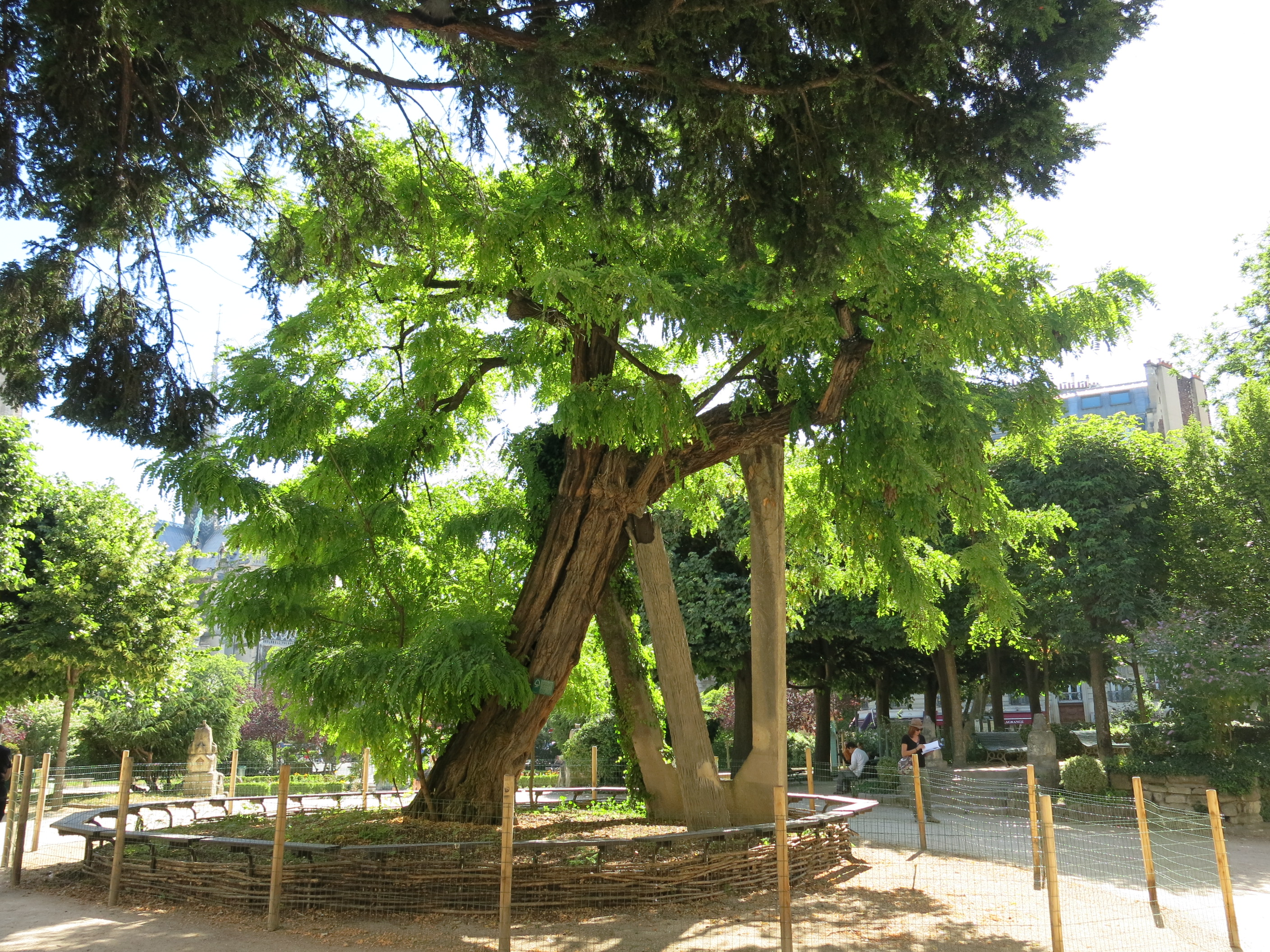
- Interactive map of Locust of square René-Viviani
- Species: Robinia pseudoacacia
- Location: 5th arrondissement of Paris
- Coordinates: 48°51′8.0″N 2°20′50.3″E
- Height: 11 m (36 ft)
- Girth: 3.85 m (12.6 ft)
- Date seeded: 1601

The locust of the square René-Viviani is a French remarkable tree located in the square René-Viviani in the 5th arrondissement of Paris. Planted in 1601, it is the oldest tree in Paris.

== History ==
This Robinia pseudoacacia (often wrongly called an "acacia") was sown in 1601 by the French botanist Jean Robin (1550–1629).

Linnaeus gave this name in tribute to the botanist of king Louis XIII. Robin received seeds from the Appalachian Mountains by the British naturalist John Tradescant the Elder (1570–1638). Robin sowed several locusts in Paris. One of them in 1601 on the place Dauphine, but this tree was destroyed. A sprout of this tree was planted by his son Vespasien Robin on the Jardin des Plantes in Paris in 1636 and is still alive.

== Description ==
The tree reaches a height of more than 11 m (36 ft). In 2021, the Paris City Hall website indicated that it was 15 m (49 ft) tall and 3.5 m (11 ft) m in circumference.

The weight of the branches caused the trunk to lean and concrete supports were built to hold the tree up. For many years, the tree was covered with ivy to hide these concrete supports. But to avoid the risk of suffocating the tree, the ivy was removed in 2016.

The trunk was struck by lightning.

Numerous shoots grow in the spring at the foot of the tree and are removed each year. It blooms in April–May.

== Gallery ==
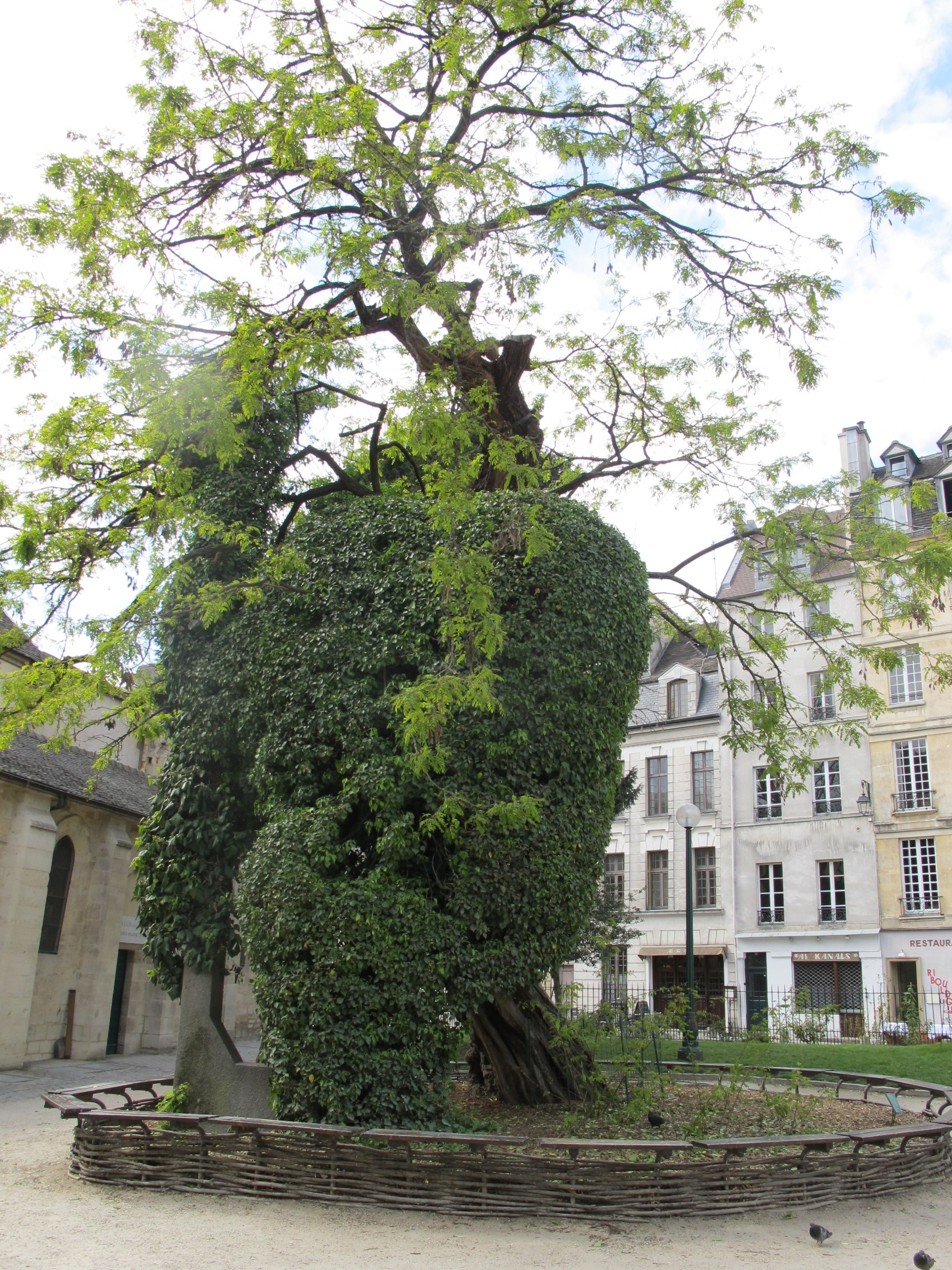
The locust covered by ivy

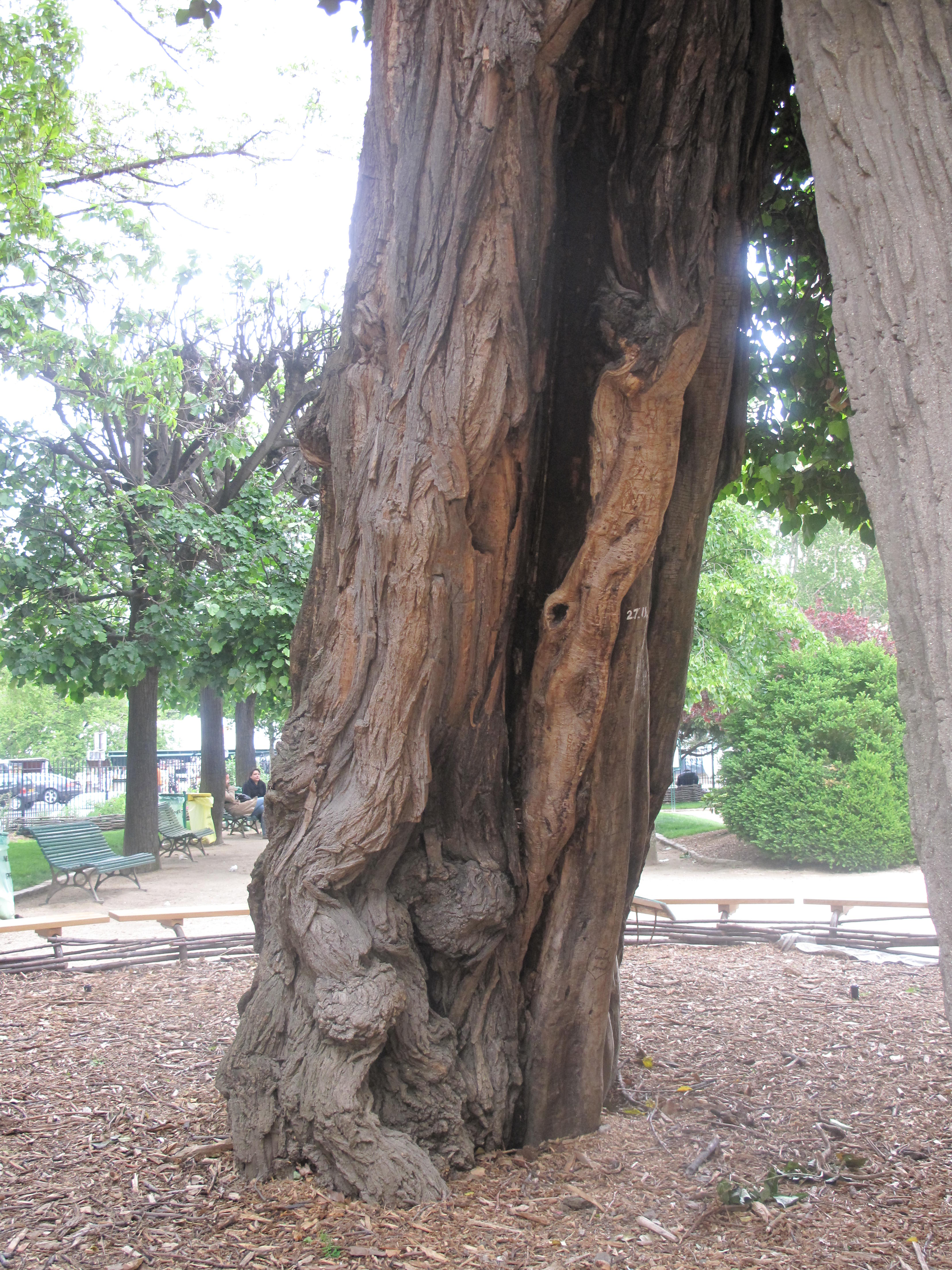
The trunk with traces of lightning
