= Franz Christian Gau =

French architect and archaeologist (1790-1854)

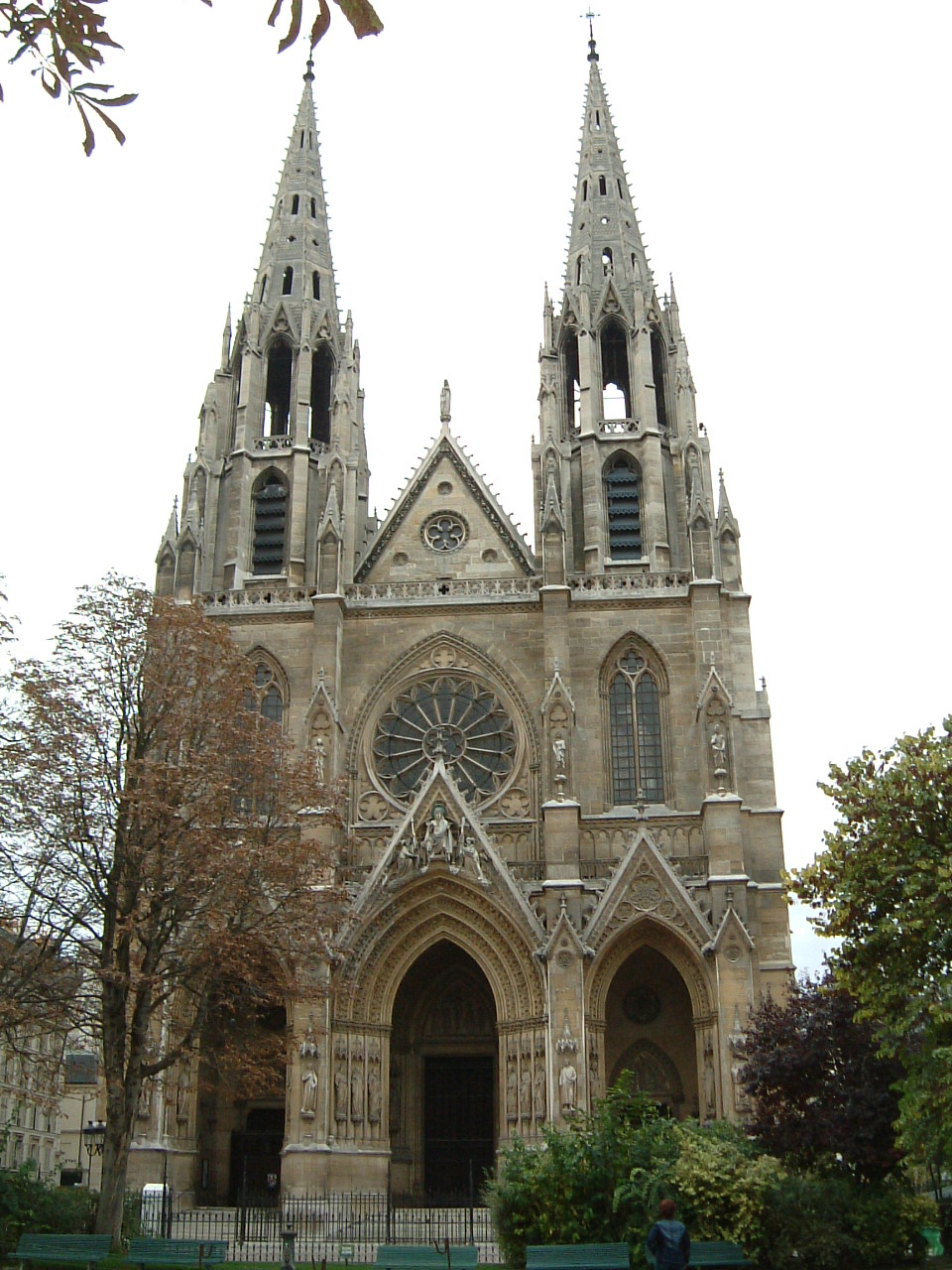
Basilique Ste-Clotilde, Paris

Franz Christian Gau (15 June 1790, in Cologne – January 1854, in Paris) was a French architect and archaeologist of German descent.

In 1809 he entered the Académie des Beaux-Arts, Paris, and in 1815 visited Italy and Sicily. In 1817 he went to Nubia, and while there he made drawings and measurements of all the more important monuments of that country, his ambition being to produce a work which should supplement the great work of the French expedition in Egypt. The result of his labours appeared in a folio volume (Stuttgart and Paris, 1822), entitled Antiquitiés de la Nubie ou monuments inédits des bords du Nil, situés entre la première et la seconde cataracte, dessinés et mesurés in 1819. It consists of sixty-eight plates, of plans, sections, and views, and was received as an authority. His next publication was the completion of Francois Mazois's work on the ruins of Pompeii.

In 1825 Gau was naturalized as a French citizen, and later became Architect of the City of Paris. He directed the restoration of the churches of Saint-Julien-le-Pauvre, and Saint-Séverin, and built the great prison of La Roquette, etc. With his name also is associated the revival of Gothic architecture in Paris - he having designed and commenced, in 1846, the erection of the Church of Sainte-Clotilde, the first modern church erected in the capital in that style. Illness compelled him to relinquish the care of supervising the work, and he died before its completion.

Gau was mentor to Gottfried Semper.

== Sources ==
- The entry cites:
  - Imperial Dict. Univ. Biog.;
  - Michaud, Biog. Univ.
