= Square René-Viviani =

Urban park in Paris, France

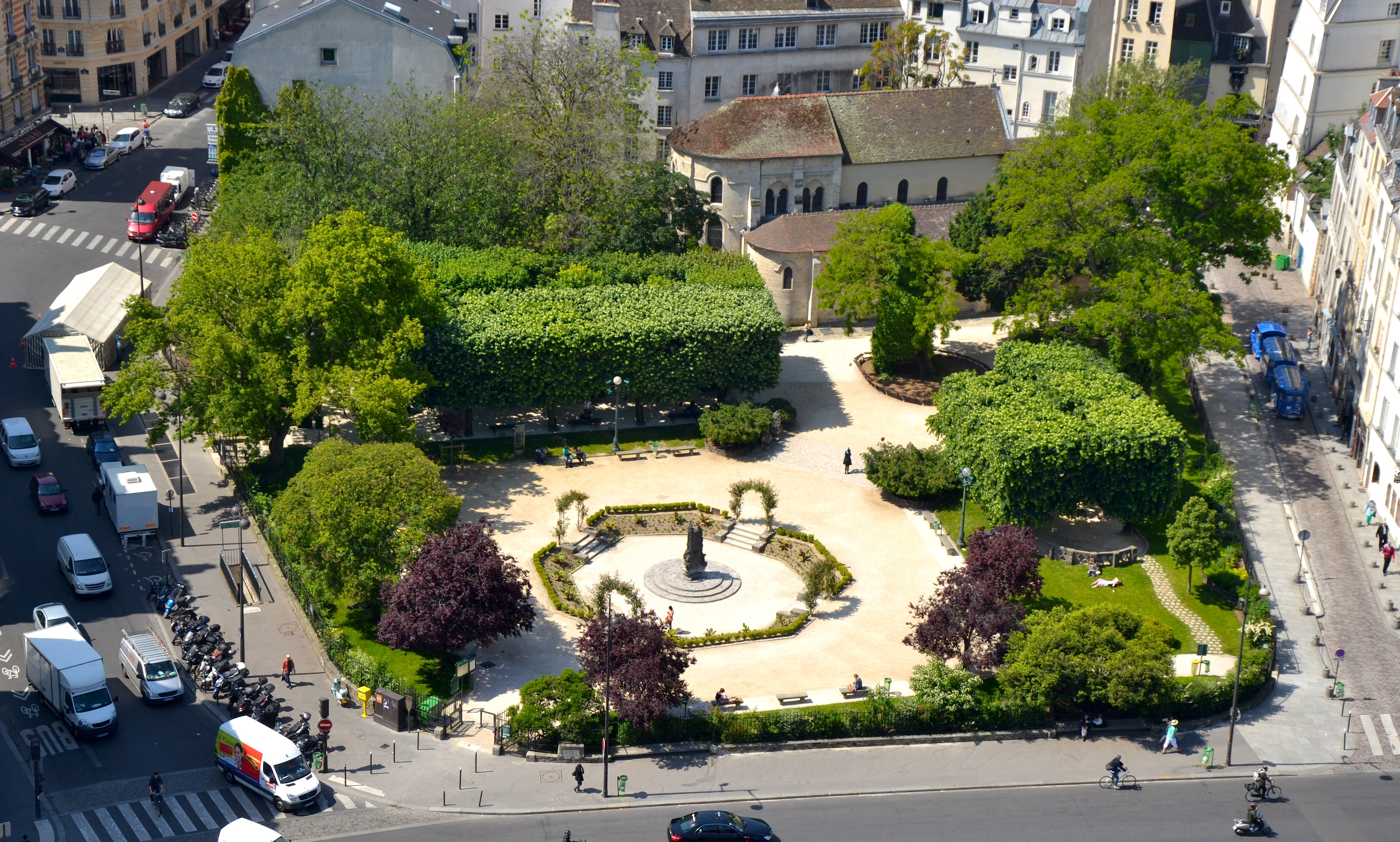
- Overview with the church of Saint-Julien-le-Pauvre in the background

- Location within Paris
- Length: 128 m (420 ft)
- Arrondissement: 5th
- Quarter: Quartier Latin
- Coordinates: 48°51′8″N 2°20′51″E

Construction
- Completion: 1928
- Denomination: René Viviani-Montebello

The Square René Viviani (Official French name: Square René Viviani-Montebello) is a public square adjacent to the Church of Saint-Julien-le-Pauvre in the 5th arrondissement of Paris. A notable feature in the square is the oldest known planted tree in Paris.

== Location ==
The Square René Viviani is a city park located slightly to the north of the Gothic church of Saint-Julien-le-Pauvre, built at the same time as Notre-Dame Cathedral and consequently one of Paris' oldest churches. Disaffected during the Revolution, in the 19th century the ruinous church was taken over by the city's Greek Melchite Church and is today the center of that religious community in Paris. The Square is an irregular polygon in shape, bounded by the Rue Galande and church buildings to the south; by the Rue Saint-Julien-le-Pauvre on the west; by the Quai de Montebello to the north; and by the Rue Lagrange and the Rue du Fouarre on the east. The Rue de la Bûcherie ends on the western side of the square, but it resumes its course on the eastern side, and the Pont au Double, a bridge to the Île de la Cité, lies across the Quai de Montebello from the square. The Square René Viviani offers one of the best views of the Cathedral of Notre Dame in all of Paris.

Around the corner, in the Rue de la Bûcherie, stands the well-known English-language bookshop, Shakespeare and Company, established in 1951. In 1964 founder George Whitman named it after Sylvia Beach's former legendary bookshop and independent publishing house near the Place de l'Odéon, which first published James Joyce's 1922 novel Ulysses and was a literary center for English-speaking writers until it was closed in 1941 when Germany occupied France.

Inside the square, there are two features, other than the lawns, walkways, well-trimmed plane trees, and benches, that deserve a mention here. There is an odd-looking fountain, known as the Saint Julien fountain, that was erected in 1995. It is the work of the French sculptor, Georges Jeanclos (1933–1997), and it is emblematic of the legend of St. Julien the Hospitaller, a tale, now largely discounted, involving a curse by witches, a talking deer, a case of mistaken identity, a horrific crime, several improbable coincidences, and a supernatural intervention. The story was told and retold during the Middle Ages, and it became a favorite. Consequently, hospitals, hospices, and churches all over Europe adopted Julien as their patron. He was also a patron saint of hunters, innkeepers, and ferrymen; traveling pilgrims often prayed for his help in finding comfortable lodgings.

== History ==
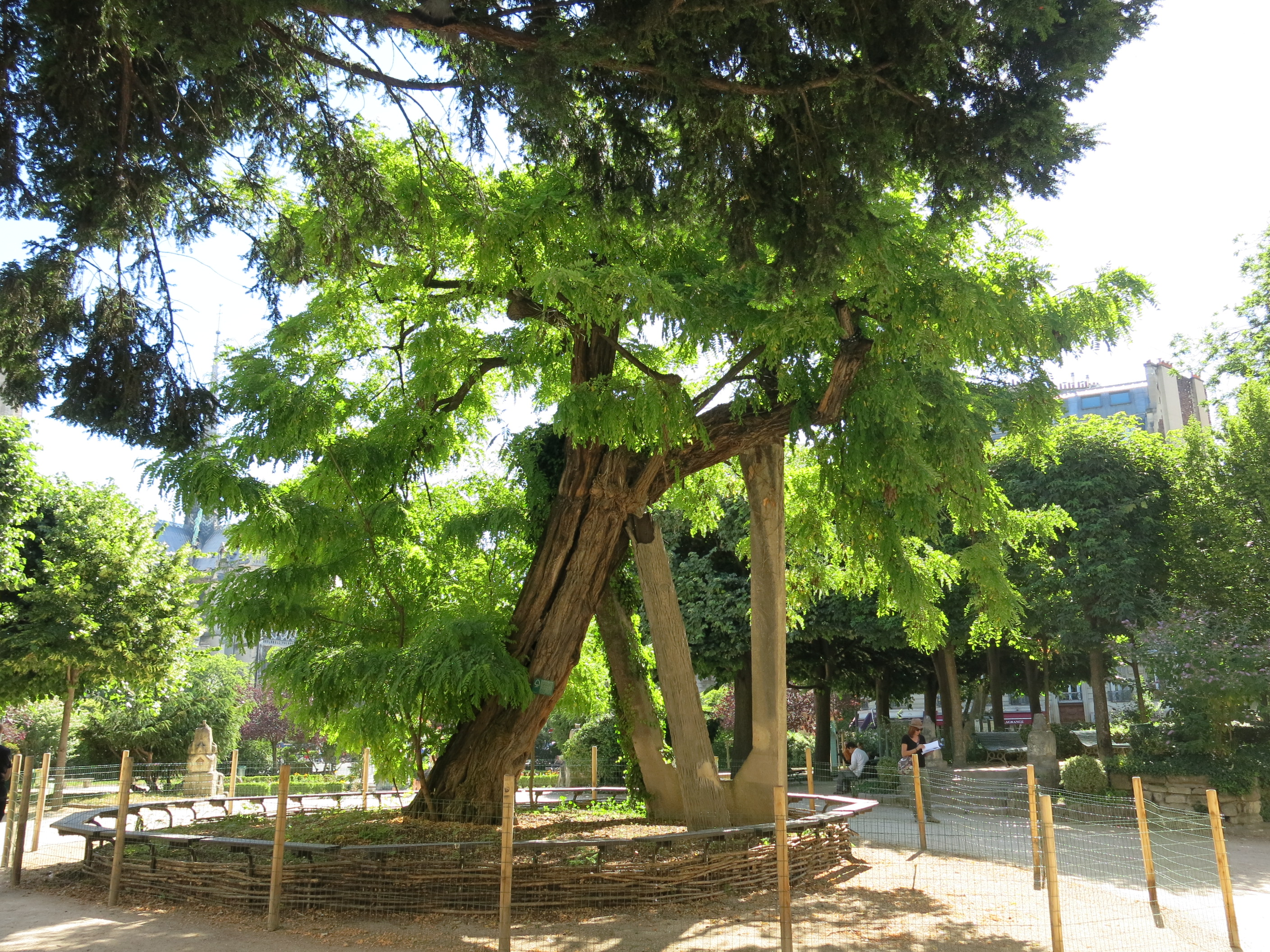
The oldest tree in Paris, a locust tree planted in 1601

Before 1909, this plot was occupied by one of the annexes of the Hôtel-Dieu, the ancient Paris hospital on the nearby Île de la Cité. In even earlier times, monastic buildings, dormitories and a refectory belonging to the Clunesian priory of St. Julien, occupied this site. Earlier still, this place was a cemetery established next to a 6th-century basilica, the original Church of St. Julien. Merovingian-era graves and tombs were excavated near the walls of Saint-Julien-le-Pauvre during the 19th century. Some of the relics are now in the Carnavalet Museum.

Here and there on the square, there are odd pieces of carved stone. They are pieces of architectural rubble salvaged from the Cathedral of Notre Dame, when, during the 19th century, the exterior of the cathedral was partially restored by the architect Eugène Viollet-le-Duc. Many of the most seriously degraded pieces of carved limestone were replaced by newly carved reproductions, and the older pieces were eventually deposited here.

The square is noted for being the site of the oldest planted tree in Paris. The locust of Square René-Viviani, of the species Robinia pseudoacacia, is believed to have been planted by its namesake, Jean Robin (1550–1620), in 1601, from a seed brought back from the Appalachian Mountains in the United States; if so, it has now been standing on the rive gauche for over four hundred years. It is supported by two concrete crutches. The tree lost its upper branches to a shell during World War I, but it proves its continuing vitality by blooming every year. Despite some speculation about its true age, it is universally recognized as the oldest tree in the city.

== Metro station ==
The Square René Viviani is:

Located near the Metro stations: Maubert-Mutualité, Saint-Michel and Cluny - La Sorbonne.

It is served by lines 4 and 10.

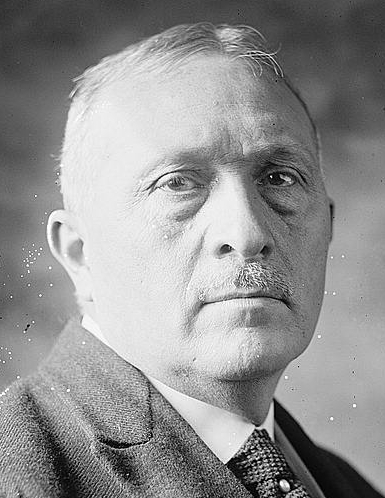
René Viviani

== René Viviani ==
The Square René Viviani is named for the French political figure René Viviani (1863–1925) who, notably, was France's first Minister of Labour. After several old buildings standing on the site were cleared away in 1928, including an annex of the public hospital across the river, the empty space was arranged to be a public park.
