= Jean Robin (botanist) =

French botanist and pharmacist (1550–1629)

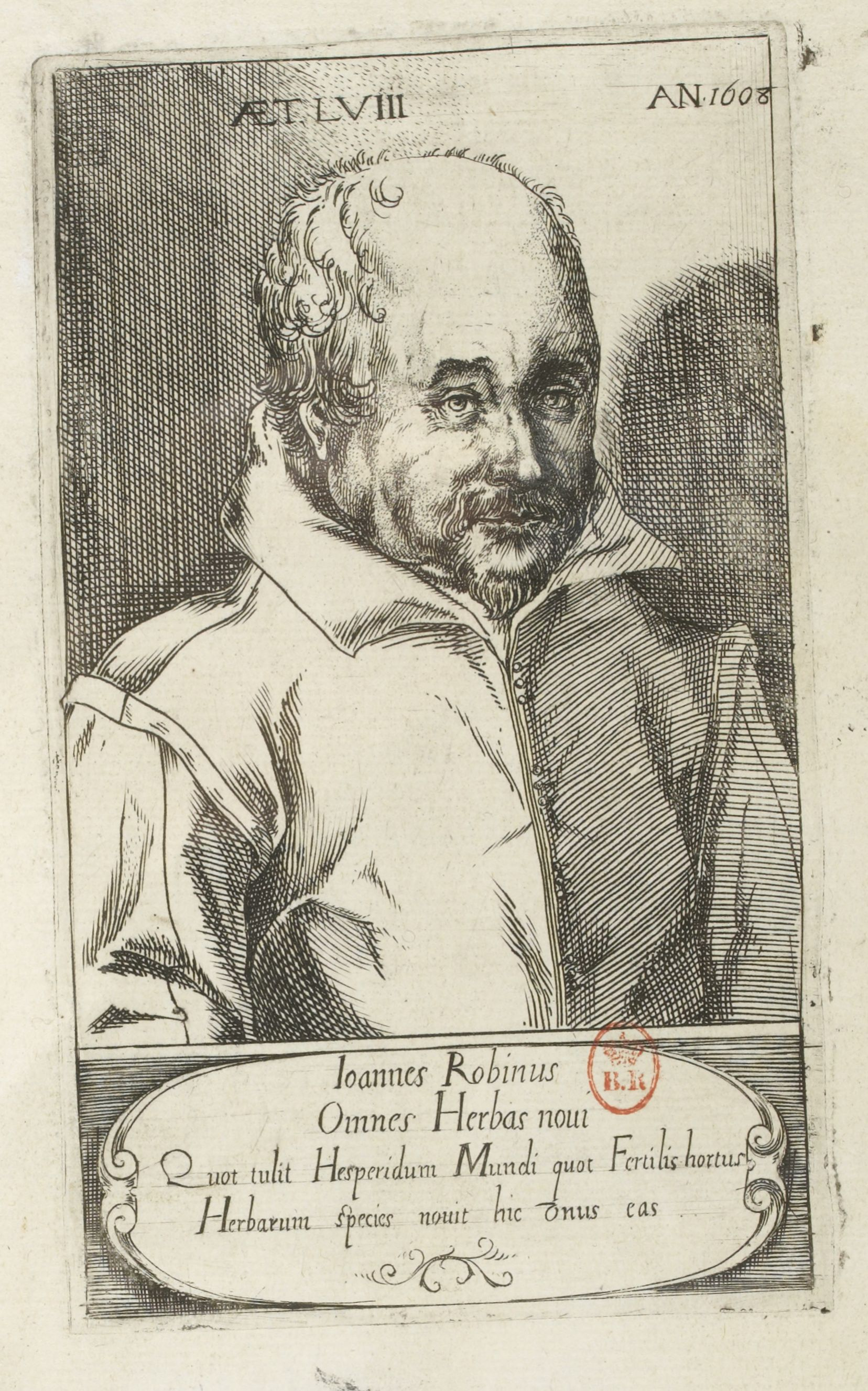
- Jean Robin in the book Le jardin du roy très chrestien Henry IV (1608)
- Born: 1550; Paris
- Died: 25 April 1629 (aged 78–79); Paris
- Scientific career
- Fields: Naturalist
- Author abbrev. (botany): J.Robin

Jean Robin (1550 – 25 April 1629), was a French herbalist. The standard author abbreviation J.Robin is used to indicate this person as the author when citing a botanical name.

== Biography ==
Robin was the gardener of the French kings Henry III, Henry IV, and Louis XIII. He was described as "simplicist" (i.e., a person growing simples, medieval medicinal herbs) or "arborist" (a person growing trees, arbres in French). In 1601, he sowed the first Robinia introduced in Europe, either in his garden, which is now the place Dauphine, or in the garden of the School of Medicine, which included the current square René-Viviani (where the Robinia still stands: Locust of Square René-Viviani). According to other sources, Robin sowed a Robinia in each of these two gardens. In 1636, his son Vespasien Robin (1579–1662) planted another specimen of Robinia in the King's Garden, now the Jardin des plantes de Paris, where it still stands.

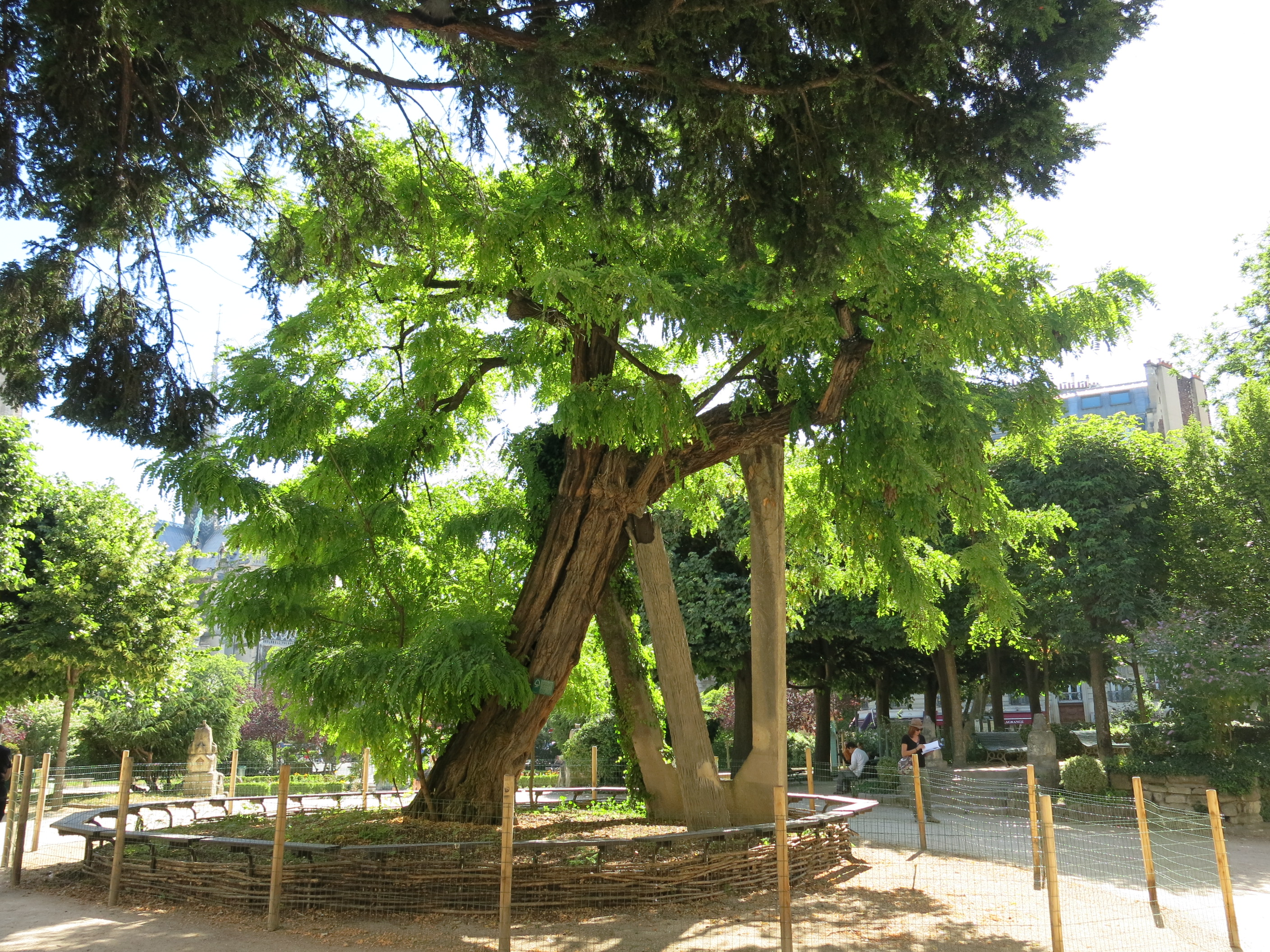
The Locust of Square René-Viviani planted by Jean Robin.

Robin published several books, the first one in 1601 was a catalog of the 1,300 native and exotic species he cultivated (Catalogus stirpium ...).

Robin was responsible for several gardens, including the one that Catherine de' Medici created for the Tuileries Palace. The small flower garden of the School of Medicine (rue de la Bûcherie) was also entrusted to him from its creation in 1597. This garden closed in 1617.

J. Robin had brought many seeds and onions of exotic plants from Holland, which he refused to share. When the Royal Garden of Medicinal Plants (now Jardin des plantes) was created in 1626, Guy de La Brosse made Vespasien Robin his sub-demonstrator: he thus obtained that Vespasien's father gave to the garden "more than twelve hundred species, which formed the first stock of the School of Botany "

== Books published ==
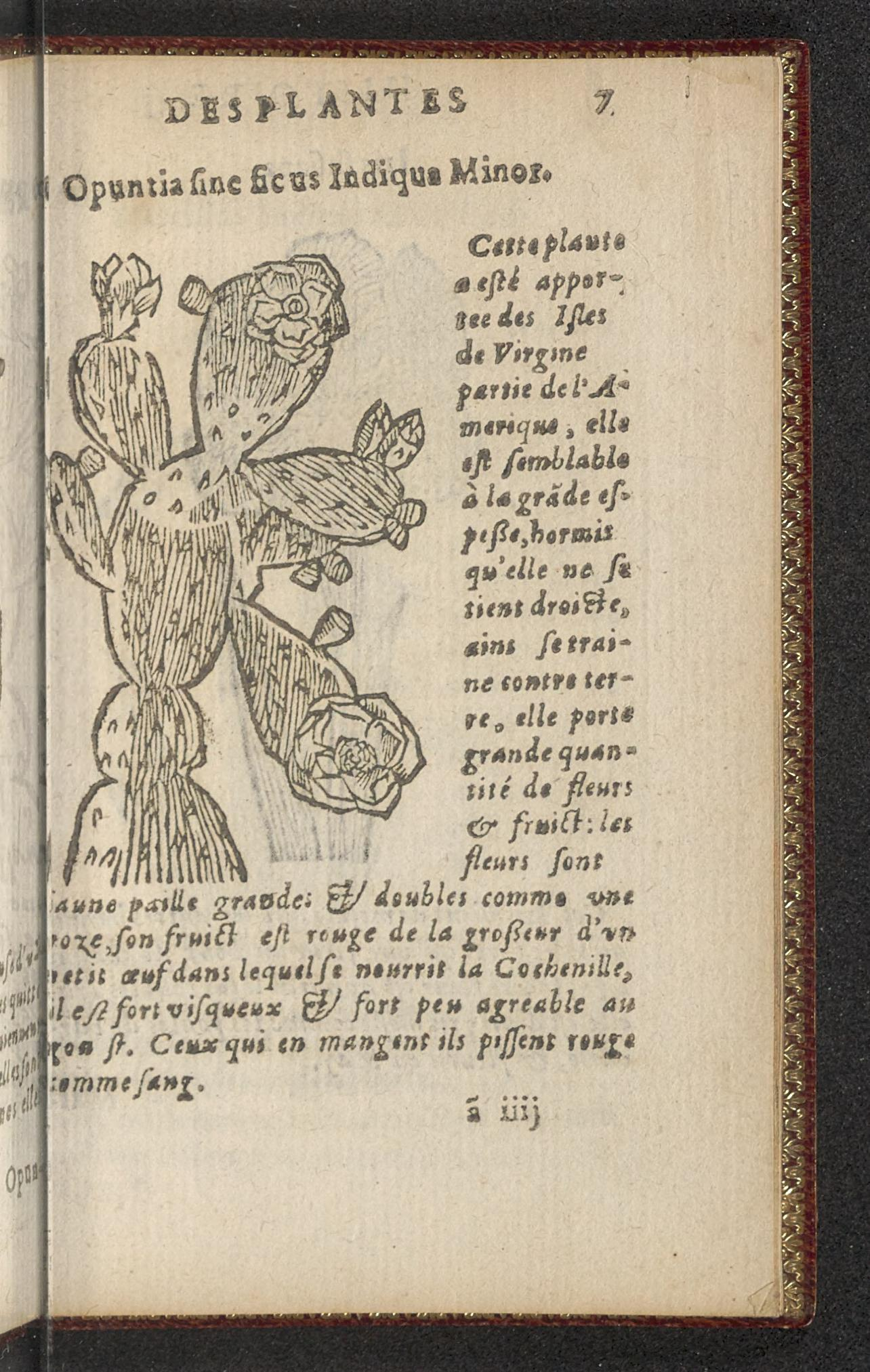
Page from Histoire des plantes, novvellement trouuées en l'isle Virgine, & autres lieux, 1620. From the Rosenwald Collection, Library of Congress.

- Catalogus stirpium tam indigenarum quam exoticarum qua Lutetiae coluntur (=Catalogue of plants local or exotic cultivated in Paris), Paris, 1601
- Le jardin du roy très chrétien Henry IV, roy de France et de Navarre, dédié à La Royne (=The garden of the good Christian King Henry IV, king of France and Navarre, dedicated to the queen), 1608
- Histoire de plantes aromatiques augmentée de plusieurs plantes venues des Indes lesquelles ont été prises & cultivées au Jardin de M. Robin, arboriste du Roi(=History of aromatic plants increased with several plants from India which were taken & cultivated in the garden of M. Robin, arborist of the King), Paris, Macé, 1619, in-16, 16 pages.
- The garden of King Louis XIII , 1623
- Enchiridion isagogicum ad facilem notitiam Stirpium tam indigenarum quam exoticarum qua coluntur in horto D.D. Joannis. & Vespasiani Robin (=Manual for easy identification of the local and exotic plants growing in the gardens of Jean et Vesapasien Robin, Paris, P. de Bresche, 1624, in-12, 71 pages.
