= Bishnupur =

Bishnupur or Vishnupur may refer to:

== Towns and villages ==
- Bishnupur, Manipur, a town in Bishnupur District, Manipur, India
- Bishnupur (West Bengal), a town in Bankura District in West Bengal, India, noted for its archaeological importance
- Bishnupur, South 24 Parganas a town in South 24 Parganas district in West Bengal, India
- Bishnupur, North 24 Parganas, a census town in North 24 Parganas district in West Bengal, India
- Bishnupur, Bara, a village in Nepal
- Bishnupur, Mahottari, a village in Nepal
- Bishnupur, in Shillong taluk, East Khasi Hills district, Meghalaya, India
- South Bishnupur (South 24 Parganas), an area in Mandirbazar, West Bengal, India
- Vishnupuri, Nanded, a village in Nanded district, Maharashtra, India
- Vishnupur Ratwara, a village in Sitamarhi district, Bihar, India
- Vishnupur, a village in West Godavari district, Andhra Pradesh, India
- Bishnupur, Birbhum, a census town in West Bengal, India

== Administrative divisions ==
- Bishnupur district in Manipur, India
- Bishnupur district, West Bengal in West Bengal, India
- Bishnupur subdivision in West Bengal, India

=== Municipal division ===
- Bishnupur Rural Municipality, Saptari, a rural municipal division in Province No. 2, Nepal
- Bishnupur Rural Municipality, Siraha, a rural municipal division in Province No. 2, Nepal

=== CD Blocks ===
- Bishnupur, Bankura (community development block) in Bankura district, West Bengal, India
- Bishnupur I - Community development block in South 24 Parganas district, West Bengal, India
- Bishnupur II - Community development block in South 24 Parganas district, West Bengal, India

=== Electoral constituencies ===
- Bishnupur (Lok Sabha constituency) in Bankura district, West Bengal, India
- Bishnupur, Bankura (Vidhan Sabha constituency) in West Bengal
- Bishnupur, South 24 Parganas (Vidhan Sabha constituency) in West Bengal
- Bishnupur (Manipur Legislative Assembly constituency), in Manipur

== Other uses ==
- Bishnupur Kingdom, a mediaeval kingdom of Bankura district, West Bengal, India
- Bishnupur gharana, a form of singing which originated in Bishnupur, Bankura

== See also ==
- Bishunpur (disambiguation)
- Vishnupriya, Hindu deity
- Bishnupriya Manipuri, Indo-Aryan language of Manipur, India
  - Bishnupriya people, ethnic group in India who speak this language
- Vishnupuram Ilakkiya Vattam, an Indian literary organization created by Tamil writer Jeyamohan
  - Vishnupuram Award, an Indian award for Tamil literature
- Vishnu Puran (TV series), an Indian series which aired in 2003
- Vishnu Purana, one of the eighteen Mahapuranas, a genre of ancient and medieval texts of Hinduism
