= South Bishnupur, South 24 Parganas =

South Bishnupur
- Village
- Location in West Bengal Location in India
- Coordinates: 22.1490°N 88.4005°E
- Country: India
- State: West Bengal
- District: South 24 Parganas
- CD Block: Mandirbazar
- Elevation: 7 m (23 ft)

Languages
  - Official: Bengali
  - Additional official: English
- Time zone: UTC+5:30 (IST)
- PIN: 743395
- Telephone code: +91 3174
- Vehicle registration: WB-19 to WB-22, WB-95 to WB-99
- Lok Sabha constituency: Mathurapur (SC)
- Vidhan Sabha constituency: Mandirbazar (SC)
- Website: www.s24pgs.gov.in

South Bishnupur is a village and a gram panchayat within the jurisdiction of the Mandirbazar police station in the Mandirbazar CD block in the Diamond Harbour subdivision of the South 24 Parganas district in the Indian state of West Bengal.

== Geography ==
South Bishnupur is located at 22°08′56″N 88°24′02″E. It has an average elevation of 7 metres (23 ft).

== Transport ==
South Bishnupur is on the State Highway 1.

Mathurapur Road railway station is located nearby.

== Healthcare ==
Naiyarat Rural Hospital at Krishnapur, with 30 beds, is the major government medical facility in the Mandirbazar CD block.
