= Bangsidharpur =

- Census Town
- Location in West Bengal Location in India
- Coordinates: 22.1723°N 88.4098°E
- Country: India
- State: West Bengal
- District: South 24 Parganas
- CD block: Mandirbazar

Area
  - Total: 1.85 km^{2} (0.71 sq mi)
- Elevation: 7 m (23 ft)

Population (2011)
  - Total: 5,218
  - Density: 2,820/km^{2} (7,310/sq mi)

Languages
  - Official: Bengali
  - Additional official: English
- Time zone: UTC+5:30 (IST)
- PIN: 743395
- Telephone code: +91 3174
- Vehicle registration: WB-19 to WB-22, WB-95 to WB-99
- Lok Sabha constituency: Mathurapur (SC)
- Vidhan Sabha constituency: Mandirbazar (SC)
- Website: www.s24pgs.gov.in

Bangsidharpur is a census town within the jurisdiction of the Mandirbazar police station in the Mandirbazar CD block in the Diamond Harbour subdivision of the South 24 Parganas district in the Indian state of West Bengal.

== Geography ==
Cities and towns in the eastern part of Diamond Harbour subdivision (including Magrahat I & II, Mandirbazar, Mathurapur I & II CD blocks) in South 24 Parganas district
M: municipal city/ town, CT: census town, R: rural/ urban centre, N: neighbourhood, T: religious centre
Owing to space constraints in the small map, the actual locations in a larger map may vary slightly

=== Area overview ===
Diamond Harbour subdivision is a rural subdivision with patches of urbanization. Only 14.61% of the population lives in the urban areas and an overwhelming 85.39% lives in the rural areas. In the eastern portion of the subdivision (shown in the map alongside) there are 24 census towns. The entire district is situated in the Ganges Delta and the eastern part of the district is a flat plain area with small towns, many in clusters. Location of places in the larger map varies a little. It is an OpenStreetMap, while we are using coordinates as in Google Maps.

Note: The map alongside presents some of the notable locations in the subdivision. All places marked in the map are linked in the larger full screen map.

=== Location ===
Bangsidharpur is located at 22.1723°N 88.4098°E

== Demographics ==
According to the 2011 Census of India, Bangsidharpur had a total population of 5,218 of which 2,704 (52%) were males and 2,514 (48%) were females. There were 760 persons in the age range of 0–6 years. The total number of literate persons in Bangsidharpur was 3,300 (74.02% of the population over 6 years).

== Infrastructure ==
According to the District Census Handbook 2011, Bangsidharpur covered an area of 1.8465 km^{2}. Among the physical aspects, there is a railway station at Jaynagar Majilpur 2 km away. Among the civic amenities, it had 2 km roads with both open and covered drains, the protected water supply involved hand pumps, tanks, ponds, lakes. It had 587 domestic electric connections and 79 road light points. Among the medical facilities, it had 3 dispensaries/ health centres, 3 nursing homes, 3 charitable hospital/ nursing homes, 2 medicine shops. Among the educational facilities it had were 2 primary schools, the nearest higher school facilities at Jaynagar Majilpur 2 km away, the nearest general degree college at Dakshin Barasat 12 km away. It had 1 non-formal education centre (Sarbya Siksha Abhijan).

== Transport ==
Bangsidharpur is on the State Highway 1.

Jaynagar Majilpur railway station is located nearby.

== Healthcare ==
Naiyarat Rural Hospital at Naiyarat, with 30 beds, is the major government medical facility in the Mandirbazar CD block.
