= Kaliprasadh =

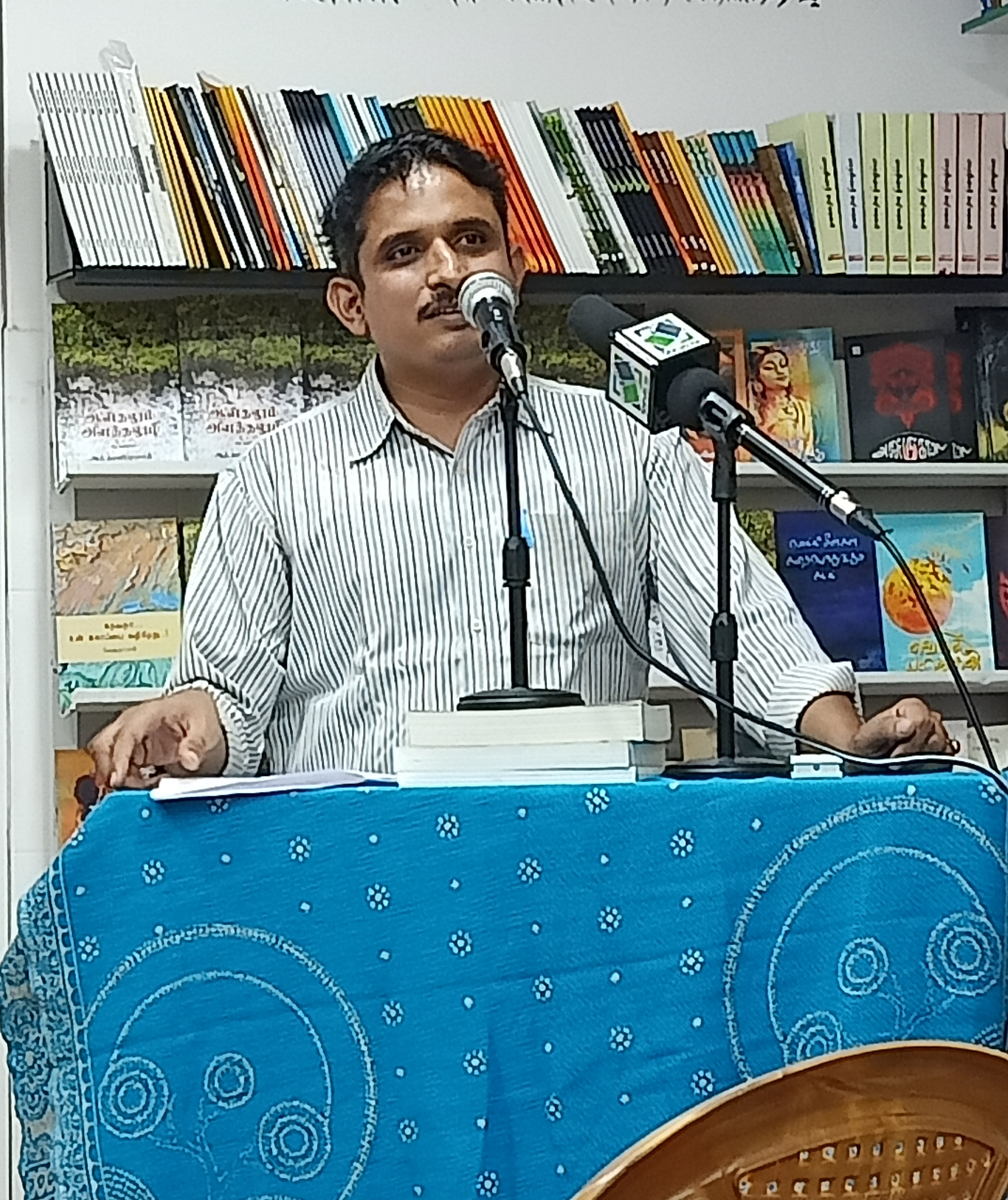
- Speaking at review event for Aaldhalum Alatthalum, Dec 2021
- Born: 6 April 1979 (age 47); Velukkudi, Tamil Nadu
- Occupations: Writer, novelist, critic
- Writing career
- Language: Tamil
- Period: 2015–present
- Subject: Literature
- Notable work: Aaldhalum Alatthalum

R. Kaliprasadh (born 1979) is a Tamil writer. He has written short stories, translations, and literary reviews and criticism.

== Biography ==
Kaliprasadh was born in 1979 in Velukkudi in present-day Thiruvarur district. In his youth, his family lived in Mannargudi. Later he moved to Chennai. He is married and has two children. He is currently working in the field of information technology in Chennai.

== Literary work ==
=== Fiction ===
Kaliprasadh started his literary career in 2015 writing short stories for literary magazines such as Solvanam. A collection of ten short stories was jointly published by Padhaakai and Yaavarum Publishers in 2021 under the title 'Aaldhalum Alatthalum', which was also the title of one of the stories. Leading author and Sahitya Academi Award winner Nanjil Nadan wrote the foreword to the book. In it, he praised the 'attractive narrative, language and neatness of writing.

Literary reviews of the work have been published in Tamil magazines like Ananda Vikatan, Solvanam and Vallinam.

In December 2021 Yaavarum Publishers organized a review symposium in Chennai for the collection. Writers Agarmuthalvan, Thenral Sivakumar, Sureshbabu and Muthukumar reviewed the work and discussed with audience.

=== Translations ===
In 2019, he translated two stories by Assamese writer Jahnavi Barua into Tamil, and published them under the titles 'Desabakthar' and 'Pachai Pulippu Mangai'.

In 2020, Kaliprasad translated the novel 'The Dhamma Man' written by Indian English writer Vilas Sarang from English to Tamil under the title Dhamman Thandhavan. Nattrinai Publishers released the book. It is a modern novel about the life of the Buddha, a mixture of stories, philosophy and politics.

Dhammam Thandhavan received widespread attention in Tamil literary sphere. Reviews were published in leading magazines like Hindu Tamil Thisai, Dinamani and in Kalaignar TV. Writer S Ramakrishnan favourably reviewed the book.

Kaliprasadh translated the short story 'I bought a little city' by American writer Donald Barthelme into Tamil in 2021 for the literary magazine Kanali.

=== Literary reviews & Criticism ===
Kaliprasad began his literary journey as a reviewer. From 2015 to 2021 he has written 36 reviews and criticisms. His reviews have appeared in popular online journals such as the Malaysian Tamil art literary magazine Vallinam and the Singapore-based magazine Aroo. His article on 'Tamil Diasponra writings' in Vasagasalai and his review article on Eelam writers which were received well. He wrote a nine-part critical essay series on the novel Venmurasu titled 'Murasum Sollum' which was published in Vallinam Magazine. His review of writer Azhagiya Periyavan's works was published Jeyamohan's website.

Kaliprasadh has also authored reviews of Sabrinathan's poetry, Malaysian writer C Muthusamy, historian and writer Raj Gauthaman, poet Samraj's works as part of essay on parody literature and on Suresh Kumara Indrajith.

=== Others ===
Kaliprasadh has been actively involved in literary organizations such as the Vishnupuram Ilakkiya Vattam and Natrunai. He helped the organizations collaborate with Yaavarum publishers to organize a review symposium event on writer S Ramakrishnan in Chennai in December 2021.

He has been invited as a special guest at the Vishnupuram Award ceremonies 2021. His works and work will be discussed as part of a colloquium during the event.
