= Chandpur, Mandirbazar =

Chandpur
- Census Town
- Location in West Bengal Location in India
- Coordinates: 22.1623°N 88.3602°E
- Country: India
- State: West Bengal
- District: South 24 Parganas
- CD block: Mandirbazar

Area
  - Total: 3.98 km^{2} (1.54 sq mi)
- Elevation: 7 m (23 ft)

Population (2011)
  - Total: 6,777
  - Density: 1,700/km^{2} (4,410/sq mi)

Languages
  - Official: Bengali
  - Additional official: English
- Time zone: UTC+5:30 (IST)
- PIN: 743395
- Telephone code: +91 3174
- Vehicle registration: WB-19 to WB-22, WB-95 to WB-99
- Lok Sabha constituency: Mathurapur (SC)
- Vidhan Sabha constituency: Mandirbazar (SC)
- Website: www.s24pgs.gov.in

Chandpur is a census town and a gram panchayat within the jurisdiction of the Mandirbazar police station in the Mandirbazar CD block in the Diamond Harbour subdivision of the South 24 Parganas district in the Indian state of West Bengal.

== Geography ==
Cities and towns in the eastern part of Diamond Harbour subdivision (including Magrahat I & II, Mandirbazar, Mathurapur I & II CD blocks) in South 24 Parganas district
M: municipal city/ town, CT: census town, R: rural/ urban centre, N: neighbourhood, T: religious centre
Owing to space constraints in the small map, the actual locations in a larger map may vary slightly

=== Area overview ===
Diamond Harbour subdivision is a rural subdivision with patches of urbanization. Only 14.61% of the population lives in the urban areas and an overwhelming 85.39% lives in the rural areas. In the eastern portion of the subdivision (shown in the map alongside) there are 24 census towns. The entire district is situated in the Ganges Delta and the eastern part of the district is a flat plain area with small towns, many in clusters. Location of places in the larger map varies a little. It is an OpenStreetMap, while we are using coordinates as in Google Maps.

Note: The map alongside presents some of the notable locations in the subdivision. All places marked in the map are linked in the larger full screen map.

=== Location ===
Chandpur is located at 22.1623°N 88.3602°E

== Demographics ==
According to the 2011 Census of India, Chandpur had a total population of 6,777 of which 3,533 (52%) were males and 3,244 (48%) were females. There were 990 persons in the age range of 0–6 years. The total number of literate persons in Chandpur was 4,679 (80.85% of the population over 6 years).

== Infrastructure ==
According to the District Census Handbook 2011, Chandpur covered an area of 3.9821 km^{2}. Among the physical aspects, there is a railway station at Mathurapur 4.5 km away. Among the civic amenities, the protected water supply involved hand pumps, tanks, ponds, lakes. It had 328 domestic electric connections. Among the medical facilities, it had 1 dispensary/ health centre. Among the educational facilities it had were 4 primary schools, the nearest higher school facilities being at Jagdishpur 3 km away. Among the social, recreational and cultural facilities it had 1 orphanage. An important commodity it produced was sholapith items. It had the branches of 1 nationalised bank and 1 agricultural credit society.

== Transport ==
A short stretch of local roads link Chandpur to the State Highway 1.

Mathurapur Road railway station is located nearby.

== Healthcare ==
Naiyarat Rural Hospital at Naiyarat, with 30 beds, is the major government medical facility in the Mandirbazar CD block.
