= Bishnupur Rural Municipality =

Bishnupur Rural Municipality may refer to:

- Bishnupur Rural Municipality, Saptari, Nepal
- Bishnupur Rural Municipality, Siraha, Nepa

== See also ==
- Bishnupur (disambiguation)
