= Lakshmikantapur =

- Village
- Location in West Bengal Location in India
- Coordinates: 22.1099°N 88.3209°E
- Country: India
- State: West Bengal
- District: South 24 Parganas
- CD Block: Mandirbazar

Area
  - Total: 0.75 km^{2} (0.29 sq mi)
- Elevation: 7 m (23 ft)

Population (2011)
  - Total: 3,966
  - Density: 5,300/km^{2} (14,000/sq mi)

Languages
  - Official: Bengali
  - Additional official: English
- Time zone: UTC+5:30 (IST)
- PIN: 743345
- Telephone code: +91 3174
- Vehicle registration: WB-19 to WB-22, WB-95 to WB-99
- Lok Sabha constituency: Mathurapur (SC)
- Vidhan Sabha constituency: Mandirbazar (SC)
- Website: www.s24pgs.gov.in

Lakshmikantapur is a village in the Mandirbazar CD block in the Diamond Harbour subdivision of the South 24 Parganas district in the Indian state of West Bengal.

== Geography ==
Cities and towns in the eastern part of Diamond Harbour subdivision (including Magrahat I & II, Mandirbazar, Mathurapur I & II CD blocks) in South 24 Parganas district
M: municipal city/ town, CT: census town, R: rural/ urban centre, N: neighbourhood, T: religious centre
Owing to space constraints in the small map, the actual locations in a larger map may vary slightly

=== Area overview ===
Diamond Harbour subdivision is a rural subdivision with patches of urbanization. Only 14.61% of the population lives in the urban areas and an overwhelming 85.39% lives in the rural areas. In the eastern portion of the subdivision (shown in the map alongside) there are 24 census towns. The entire district is situated in the Ganges Delta and the eastern part of the district is a flat plain area with small towns, many in clusters. Location of places in the larger map varies a little. It is an OpenStreetMap, while we are using coordinates as in Google Maps.

Note: The map alongside presents some of the notable locations in the subdivision. All places marked in the map are linked in the larger full screen map.

=== Location ===
Lakshmikantapur is located at 22°06′36″N 88°19′15″E. It has an average elevation of 7 metres (23 ft).

== Demographics ==
According to the 2011 Census of India, Lakshmikantapur had a total population of 3,966 of which 2,002 (50%) were males and 1,964 (50%) were females. There were 423 persons in the age range of 0–6 years. The total number of literate persons in Lakshmikantapur was 2,975 (83.97% of the population over 6 years).

== Transport ==
Lakshmikantapur is on the State Highway 1.

Lakshmikantapur railway station is on the Sealdah–Namkhana line of the Kolkata Suburban Railway system.

=== Commuters ===
With the electrification of the railways, suburban traffic has grown tremendously since the 1960s. As of 2005–06, more than 1.7 million (17 lakhs) commuters use the Kolkata Suburban Railway system daily. After the partition of India, refugees from erstwhile East Pakistan and Bangladesh had a strong impact on the development of urban areas in the periphery of Kolkata. The new immigrants depended on Kolkata for their livelihood, thus increasing the number of commuters. Eastern Railway runs 1,272 EMU trains daily.

== Healthcare ==
Naiyarat Rural Hospital at Krishnapur, with 30 beds, is the major government medical facility in the Mandirbazar CD block.
