= Gnanakoothan =

- Born: R. Ranganathan; 7 October 1938; Mayuram, Madras Province, British India (now Mayiladuthurai, Tamil Nadu, India)
- Died: 27 July 2016 (aged 77); Chennai, Tamil Nadu, India
- Occupation: Poet
- Writing career
- Pen name: Gnanakoothan
- Period: 1957–2016
- Notable works: Anru veru kizhamai Suriyanukku Pinpakkam; Kadarkaraiyil Sila Marankal; Meendum Avarkal; Pencil Padangal
- Website: www.gnanakoothan.com

R. Ranganathan (7 October 1938 – 27 July 2016), known professionally as Gnanakoothan, was an Indian poet. Writing in Tamil, he was the author of Anru veru kizhamai ("That was another day"), Suriyanukku Pinpakkam ("The rear side of Sun"), Kadarkaraiyil Sila Marankal ("Few trees in the seashore"), Meendum Avarkal ("Them again"), and Pencil Padangal ("Pencil pictures"). He was one of the modern Tamil poets in Tamil literature, and a regular contributor to topical columns in Tamil periodicals such as Kalki, Kalachuvadu and Uyirmai. He was one of the founder-editors of the little magazine Kacatathapara along with N. Krishnamurthy, Sa. Kandasamy, and N. Muthusamy. He started and ran Gavanam for a brief period. He was also one of the editors of Zha, along with Atmanam and R. Rajagopalan. He contributed to several little magazines including Maiyam, Vrutcham (now Naveena Vrutcham), and Kanaiyazhi. His works also appeared in little magazines like Illakkiya Vattam of Ka. Na. Subramaniam and C. Mani's Nadai, in which his poems appeared first. His works are known for their social satire. He died on 27 July 2016 at the age of 78.

== Career ==
He entered the field of poetry through the poem Prachanai (The problem). He has been writing poems since 1968. Antru Veru Kilamai, Sooriyanukku pinpakkam, Kadarkariyil Sila Marangal and Meendum Avargal are his famous works. In 1998 a collection of poems Gnanakoothan kavithaigal was published.

== Works ==
- Anru veru kizhamai (That Was Another Day)
- Suriyanukku Pinpakkam (The Rear Side of the Sun)
- Kadarkaraiyil Sila Marankal (A few Trees in the Seashore)
- Meendum Avarkal (Again They)
- Pencil Padangal (Pencil Pictures)
- Gnanakoothan Kavithaigal (Gnanakoothan's Poems)
- En Ulam Nitri Nee (You Are in My Heart)
- Imbar Ulagam (The Present World)
- Gnanakoothan Kavithaigal: Muzhu Thoguppu (Gnanakoothan's Poems: Complete Collection)

== Awards ==
- SARAL Award for poetry in 2010.
- Vishnupuram Award (2014) for contributions to literature, awarded by Vishnupuram Ilakkiya Vattam

== Contribution to films ==
He was one of the Tamil writers involved in the making of the film Marudhanayagam alongside Tamil writers Puviarasu and Sujatha.
