= Bama (writer) =

Tamil novelist (born 1958)

- Born: Faustina Mary Fatima Rani; 14 March 1958 (age 68); W. Pudupatti, composite Ramanathapuram district, Madras State (now Virudhunagar district, Tamil Nadu), India
- Occupations: writer, teacher.
- Movement: Tamil Dalit Movement
- Parent(s): Sebasthiamma (mother); Susairaj (father)
- Relatives: Raj Gauthaman (elder brother)

Bama (born 14 March 1958), also known as Bama Faustina Soosairaj, is a Tamil Dalit feminist, teacher and novelist. Her autobiographical novel Karukku (1992) chronicles the joys and sorrows experienced by Dalit Christian women in Tamil Nadu. She subsequently wrote two more novels, Sangati (1994) and Vanmam (2002) along with three collections of short stories: Kusumbukkaran (1996) and Oru Tattvum Erumaiyum (2003), 'Kandattam'(2009). In addition to this, she has written twenty short stories.

== Early life and family ==
"We who are asleep must open our eyes and look about us. We must not accept the injustice of our enslavement by telling ourselves it is our fate, as if we have no true feelings; we must dare to stand up for change. We must crush all these institutions that use caste to bully us into submission, and demonstrate that among human beings there are none who are high or low. Those who have found their happiness by exploiting us are not going to go easily. It is we who have to place them where they belong and bring about a changed and just society where all are equal."

— Bama in Karukku (2012).

Bama was born on 14 March 1958 as Faustina Mary Fatima Rani in a Roman Catholic family belonging to the Paraiyar community from W. Pudupatti, now a town in Virudhunagar district of Tamil Nadu. Later she accepted 'Bama' as her pen name. Her father, Susairaj was employed in the Indian Army and her mother was named Sebasthiamma. She is the sister of famous Dalit writer Raj Gauthaman. Bama's grandfather had converted from Hinduism to Christianity. Bama's ancestors were from the Dalit community and worked as agricultural labourers. Bama had her early education in her village. Her early literary influences include Tamil writers like Jayakantan, Akhilan, Mani, and Parthasarthy. In college, she read and enjoyed Kahlil Gibran and Rabindranath Tagore. On graduation, she became a schoolteacher for very poor girls, following which she served as a nun for seven years. She chose to take the holy orders to escape caste-based discrimination, and also to further her mission of helping in the advancement of poor Dalit girls.

== Writing career ==
After joining the nunnery, Bama found out that there was a separate training centre for Dalit Catholics. Angered by the poor conditions of the Dalit Catholic training centre, she left the nunnery after seven years. She finished her studies and joined as a teacher at a Catholic Christian school. During her teaching experience, she found out that the Catholic nuns oppressed the Dalit children and teachers. This further added to her disdain towards the convent. This was when she began writing. With the encouragement of a friend (possibly Gauthaman's friend Mark Stephen, a Catholic priest-activist), she wrote on her childhood experiences. These experiences formed the basis for her first novel, Karukku published in 1992. Bama wrote the novel in a dialect of Tamil that is unique to her community. She said she faced flak regarding the choice of her language from the members of the upper caste. That's when she decided to use the same dialect in all the novels subsequently. When the novel was published, Bama was ostracised from her village for portraying it in poor light and was not allowed to enter it for the next seven months. Karukku was, however, critically acclaimed and won the Crossword Book Award in 2000. It has since become a textbook in various courses like Marginal Literature, Literature in Translation, Autobiography, Feminist Literature, Subaltern Literature and Dalit Literature, across many universities. Bama followed it with Sangati and Kusumbukkaran. Bama got a loan and set up a school for Dalit children in Uttiramerur. Bama's Karukku has been translated to English and Kusumbukkaran and Sangati to French. Sangati has also been translated to Telugu by Dalit writer and activist Joopaka Subhadra. Bama recently published an essay in Single By Choice: happily unmarried women!, a collection of 13 essays by unmarried women in India talking about their singlehood. In her essay she talks about her choice of being a single professional Dalit woman in India. While she did grow up with dreams of marrying a man and having a girl child, she gradually chose being a single woman because according to her "the institution and structure of marriage and family as they exist today, are not woman-friendly at all." She also says, "I liked being myself; I didn’t want to lose my self, my being, my freedom and identity, for anyone." However, her life choices have not been without its own set of challenges. She talks about how she has had to experience insults and suspicion for choosing to be single.

== Themes ==
Bama's novels focus on caste and gender discrimination. They portray caste-discrimination practised in Christianity and Hinduism. In an interview, Bama has said that she writes because she considers it her duty and responsibility to share the experiences of her people. In addition, she also finds the act of writing cathartic and liberating. For her, "writing itself is a political act", and a "weapon" that she uses to continuously fight against the dehumanizing caste practice.

== Bibliography ==
- Karukku (1992; 2nd ed. with postscript, 2012) ISBN 978-0199450411
- Sangati (1994) ISBN 978-0195698435
- Kusumbukkaran (1996)
- Vanmam (2002) ISBN 9780195696332
- Oru Tattavum Erumaiyum (2003) ISBN 9789388973861
- Kondattam (2009)

All of her works have been translated into English and French.
