= MGR Film City =

Film studio in Taramani, Chennai. India

Coordinates: 12°59′33″N 80°14′42″E

The MGR Film City is an integrated film studio complex in Taramani, Chennai. It was established in 1994 mainly to attract filmmakers and tourists and originally named after former chief minister of Tamil Nadu MG Ramachandran JJ Film City by the AIADMK government. When DMK returned to power in 1996 it was renamed MGR Film City after the popular actor and late Chief Minister M. G. Ramachandran. It also houses a film institute, known as MGR Film and Television Institute.

== Features ==
The MGR Film City has numerous sets built on various themes to serve as scenery for movies. Sets on Mughal and Japanese themes are popular. Several movies including Avvai Shanmugi, Mudhalvan, Hey Ram and the launching ceremony of the shelved Marudhanayagam were shot at the MGR Film City. Queen Elizabeth visited the place during her tour to India in 1997. Although it experienced initial success, the film city fell back, accumulating a loss of 14 crores (140 million). It also has entertainment facilities for children. Actor Aamir Khan donated rupees 1.5 lakhs ((₹)150,000 or $3,000 to $4,000) to the city in 2008.

== Developments ==
In 2002 the MGR Film City was handed over to TIDCO to develop the area into a knowledge park. The film city's proximity to the Adyar Film Institute, IIT Madras and the IT corridor was cited as the reason for it to be developed into a knowledge park. TIDCO has plans to build various research facilities for biotechnology and information technology in the premise. An international grade movie park was also planned in the film city.

In August 2014, Chief Minister Jayalalithaa announced setting up of two modern studios at a cost of ₹ 150 million. These two air-conditioned studios would cover over 2.5 acres within the MGR Government Film and Television Institute campus.

The Film City is closed since 2002 and no sightseeing allowed ever since.
