= Hey Ram =

2000 Indian film by Kamal Haasan

- Theatrical release poster
- Directed by: Kamal Haasan
- Screenplay by: Kamal Haasan
- Dialogues by: Kamal Haasan (Tamil); Manohar Shyam Joshi (Hindi)
- Story by: Kamal Haasan
- Produced by: Kamal Haasan; Chandrahasan
- Starring: Kamal Haasan; Shah Rukh Khan; Rani Mukerji; Hema Malini; Vasundhara Das; Naseeruddin Shah; Atul Kulkarni
- Cinematography: Tirru
- Edited by: Renu Saluja
- Music by: Ilaiyaraaja
- Production company: Raaj Kamal Films International
- Distributed by: Raaj Kamal Films International (Tamil); Dreamz Unlimited (Hindi)
- Release date: 18 February 2000
- Running time: 210 minutes (Tamil); 207 minutes (Hindi)
- Country: India
- Languages: Tamil; Hindi
- Budget: ₹11 crore
- Box office: ₹11.3 crore

Hey Ram is a 2000 Indian historical crime drama film written, directed, and produced by Kamal Haasan, that stars him in the title role. It was simultaneously made in the Tamil and Hindi languages.

The film's soundtrack and score were composed by Ilaiyaraaja. It is an alternate history film that depicts India's Partition, Direct Action Day and the assassination of Mahatma Gandhi by Nathuram Godse. The Hindi version was distributed by Shah Rukh Khan's Dreamz Unlimited. The title of the film was derived from Gandhi's alleged last words.

Hey Ram received positive reviews but failed commercially at the box office. It was screened at the International Film Festival of India and selected by the Film Federation of India as its submission to the Oscars in the year 2000 but was not nominated. The film has garnered three National Film Awards. Internationally, the film was screened at the 25th Toronto International Film Festival and at the 2000 Locarno Festival.

== Plot ==
In 1999 Chennai, 89-year-old Saket Ram lies dying under the care of his grandson, Saket Ram Jr.—a historical fiction novelist—and their family physician, Dr. Munawar. To comfort him, Ram Jr. recounts his grandfather's youth, intending to adapt the story into his next novel.

In 1946, Saket Ram is an archaeologist working at Mohenjo-daro under Mortimer Wheeler, alongside his closest friend Amjad Ali Khan, a Pathan Muslim. Both oppose the impending Partition of India, while Amjad insists on remaining in India, which he considers his homeland. When communal tensions force the archaeological site to close, Ram returns to his wife, Aparna, in Calcutta, arriving during the Direct Action Day riots. While searching for food, he rescues a young Sikh girl from a Muslim mob, but is later taken hostage at home by rioters led by his family tailor, Altaf. The men rape Aparna and slit her throat as police approach. Consumed by grief, Ram hunts down and kills Altaf.

Ram then roams the streets killing rioters until he encounters Shriram Abhyankar, a Thanjavur Marathi leading a militant Hindu faction. Abhyankar recruits him, feeding his anger with banned literature that portrays Mohandas Karamchand Gandhi as responsible for Hindu suffering and the nation's division. In 1947, Ram returns to his ancestral home in Thanjavur and, under family pressure, marries Mythili, the daughter of family friends. Though he gradually falls in love with her, he is disturbed that she and her family are devout followers of Gandhi.

Ram returns to Calcutta and joins a mob confronting Gandhi and Bengal's Prime Minister, Huseyn Shaheed Suhrawardy. Although the leaders' pleas for forgiveness disperse the crowd, Ram remains hostile. During his honeymoon with Mythili in Bombay, he encounters Abhyankar in disguise, who introduces him to a wealthy deposed Maharaja and a traumatised Sindhi refugee, Manohar Lalwani. They revive Ram's hatred and persuade him that Gandhi must be killed to protect Hindus. After a riding accident leaves Abhyankar paralysed, Ram vows to renounce his personal life and carry out the assassination.

In the present, Ram's condition worsens as he and Dr. Munawar are caught in riots commemorating the anniversary of the Babri Masjid demolition. Forced into an underground police bunker, Ram listens to the violence and reflects on the hatred that shaped his youth.

In 1947, Ram abandons his pregnant wife and travels to Varanasi, where he ritually renounces his worldly attachments before going to Delhi to assassinate Gandhi. He unknowingly stays at the same hotel as another fundamentalist, Nathuram Godse. When police raid the hotel targeting Godse, Ram hides his gun on a delivery truck bound for a soda factory in Chandni Chowk.

While retrieving the weapon, Ram unexpectedly reunites with Amjad, who is sheltering displaced Muslim families, including his wife Nafisa and their children, inside the factory. When the refugees discover that Ram is seeking a gun, a misunderstanding sparks a riot. During their escape, Amjad learns of Ram's plan to kill Gandhi and urges him to abandon his vengeance, revealing that Hindus killed his own father but that he chose peace instead.

A Hindu mob corners them, and although Ram tries to protect Amjad, his friend is struck in the head with a hammer. Ram kills the attackers and carries the mortally wounded Amjad to safety, helping defend the factory until the military arrives. Amjad dies in hospital holding Ram's hand, telling police that Ram is his brother and saved his life.

Shaken by Amjad's sacrifice, Ram's father-in-law brings him to Gandhi. Impressed by Ram's defence of the Muslim families, Gandhi invites him to join his forthcoming peace march to Pakistan. Gandhi's compassion and commitment to non-violence destroy Ram's hatred, and he resolves to confess his assassination plot. Before he can do so, Godse assassinates Gandhi. Ram attempts to shoot Godse but is restrained by the crowd. From then on, he dedicates his life to Gandhian principles.

In the bunker, the modern riots subside. Elderly Ram tells his grandson his final words and dies peacefully. At his funeral, Gandhi's great-grandson, Tushar Gandhi, visits the family. Ram Jr. takes him to a room containing historical archives and gives him Gandhi's spectacles and footwear, which Ram recovered from the assassination site and preserved as symbols of his redemption.

== Cast ==
- Kamal Haasan as Saket Ram
- Shah Rukh Khan as Amjad Ali Khan
- Hema Malini as Ambujam
- Rani Mukerji as Aparna Ram
- Vasundhara Das as Mythili Ram
- Girish Karnad as Uppilli Iyengar
- Naseeruddin Shah as Mahatma Gandhi
- Om Puri as Goel
- Atul Kulkarni as Shriram Abhayankar / Ramakrishna Pande
- Vikram Gokhale as Maharaja
- Saurabh Shukla as Mahohar Lalwani
- Nassar as Ibrahim, Police Officer
- Abbas as Dr. Munavar
- Sowcar Janaki as Mythili's grandmother
- Vaali as Bhashyam Iyengar
- Iravati Harshe as Nafisa
- V. S. Raghavan as K. T. Chari
- Delhi Ganesh as Chari the leader of the Hindu mob who ambush Saket Ram and Amjad
- Gollapudi Maruti Rao as Govardhan
- Chhavi Vashisht as Jaya
- Y. G. Mahendran as Yagyam
- Vaiyapuri as Vedha (Tamil) / Arun Mehra as Vedha (Hindi)
- Arun Bali as Huseyn Shaheed Suhrawardy
- Shadaab Khan as Altaf Tailor
- Yatin Karyekar as Qureshi
- Manoj Pahwa as Jalal
- Chandrahasan as Mohangandhi Raman
- Mohini Mathur as Haajra Begum
- Tushar Gandhi as himself
- Sharad Ponkshe as Nathuram Godse
- Shubhangi Gokhale as Rani
- Annapurna as Mrs. Chattopadhyay
- U. B. G. Menon as V. K. Nair
- Shruti K. Haasan as Vallabhbhai Patel's daughter
- Aravind as Sankar Kishthaya
- Shabbir as Aparna's attacker
- A. C. Murali as Parthasarathy
- Nikita Palekar as Pushpa Iyengar
- Gautham Kanthadai as Saket Ram Jr.

== Production ==
=== Development ===
Kamal Haasan had spent all of 1998 on filming Marudhanayagam, which ended up in production hell due to lack of funds, and did not act in any other film during the period (barring Kaathala Kaathala), much to the dismay of his fans. To please them, he sought to begin and finish another film before resuming work on Marudhanayagam, which became Hey Ram. Another motivation for Haasan to do the film was because, although he was born in a family of people devoted towards Mahatma Gandhi, he himself was not initially a devotee, and had a critical view of Gandhi even as a teenager. Haasan initially intended to title the film as Satya Sodanai (transl. Experiments With Truth), a reference to the title of Gandhi's autobiography, published in English as The Story of My Experiments with Truth, but later decided on Hey Ram, the last words allegedly spoken by Gandhi when he was assassinated by Nathuram Godse. The film was produced by Haasan and his brother Chandrahasan under their banner Raaj Kamal Films International, and was the company's first film to be shot simultaneously in Tamil and Hindi. The dialogues for the Hindi version were written by Manohar Shyam Joshi. The cinematography and editing were handled by Tirru and Renu Saluja respectively.

=== Casting ===
Haasan chose Shah Rukh Khan to portray the Pathan character Amjad Ali Khan, partly because the actor's father was a Pathan who was from Peshawar. Though not a native Tamil speaker, Khan dubbed in his own voice. It marks Khan's debut in Tamil cinema. He did not ask for any remuneration from Haasan, as he considered it an honour and privilege to work with one of his mentors. The Marathi actor Mohan Gokhale was initially cast as Shriram Abhyankar; he had started working on the film in Madras but died suddenly due to a heart attack. Haasan later chose Atul Kulkarni, another Marathi actor, to do the role. Hema Malini, who had reduced acting in films by then, accepted to act as Ambujam after being offered the role by Haasan. For the role of Ambujam's daughter Mythili, Haasan initially wanted Malini's daughter Esha Deol; the role ultimately went to Vasundhara Das. It is her first major appearance in a Tamil film. Hassan's daughter Shruti made her acting debut, portraying Vallabhai Patel's daughter.

Haasan initially considered having British actor Ben Kingsley, who portrayed Gandhi in a 1982 film, to reprise the role in Hey Ram but dropped the idea as he felt "it would be cliched and the film wouldn't be honest". He later approached Naseeruddin Shah, who portrayed Gandhi in the 1998 play Mahatma vs Gandhi and had unsuccessfully auditioned for the 1982 film. Shah was initially reluctant due to the long hours of makeup required, but eventually accepted. Haasan wanted a Bengali woman to portray Saket Ram's Bengali wife Aparna, and chose Rani Mukerji, also because of her Hindi cinema stardom. Saurabh Shukla was cast as a Sindhi character Lalwani after Haasan was impressed with his performance in Satya (1998). Girish Karnad, who portrayed Saket Ram's father-in-law Uppili Iyengar, recommended Sharad Ponkshe, who portrayed Godse in the Marathi play Me Nathuram Godse Boltoy, to Haasan for reprising his role in the film. Gandhi's great-grandson Tushar wanted to join the film, and Haasan accepted; Tushar plays himself. Mohini Mathur, who was 13 years old when witnessing Gandhi's assassination, accepted Haasan's request to play Amjad Ali Khan's mother Haajra.

=== Filming ===
Principal photography began on 22 March 1999. The then Shankaracharya of Kanchi had filmed an interview scene for the film but later requested that his portions be removed to avoid controversy. To achieve on-site dubbing of dialogues, Haasan hired Srivastav from Mumbai. Production of the film cost a total of ₹11 crore (worth ₹92 crore in 2021 prices), excluding Haasan's salary. To show Mohenjodaro of ancient times, the crew recreated a set at a village near Chennai as the original location was located in Pakistan which the crew felt was impossible to go to, for political reasons. Sabu Cyril recreated the set of Birla Mandir at Ooty. In order to recreate the ambience of late evening in winter for the scene where Gandhi got assassinated, Thiru "had to get the special lights, rig the whole area, create a scaffolding end bring in the amber look. We could also manage the sunlight-peeping-through-the-trees effect".

== Soundtrack ==
Initially Haasan chose L. Subramaniam to compose music for the film. Haasan completed shooting the whole film along with the song sequences that were composed by Subramaniam. According to Haasan, when he approached Subramaniam for the final sound for mixing, he had asked for ₹1 crore, which was not the amount agreed upon earlier. So Haasan went to Ilaiyaraaja to help him solve this situation. Haasan told Ilaiyaraaja that the songs had already been shot with the music composed by Subramaniam and he wanted to remove the songs and re-shoot them with Ilaiyaraaja's. On hearing that, Ilaiyaraaja told Haasan that he could fix it without Haasan needing to re-shoot any footage or songs; Haasan agreed after initial reluctance. Subramaniam said he left the project, fearing that his association with the film may offend Hindu people due to its contentious storyline.

The lyrics for the songs were not changed, but Ilaiyaraaja composed new tunes for the songs that would be in sync with the already shot footage. The background music and the songs were recorded in Hungary's Budapest Symphony Orchestra and thus Hey Ram became the first Tamil film and the second Indian film to be re-recorded with a foreign symphony orchestra. The first one was Ilaiyaraaja's own score for the Malayalam film Guru (1997). The song "Isaiyil Thodangudhamma" was not present initially, but Ilaiyaraaja had seen an opportunity for a possible song in the scene and asked Haasan to give him a chance to add one. But Haasan, being the writer-director of the film, did not see it. Then Ilaiyaraaja convinced Haasan to trust him with this and brought Hindustani singer Ajoy Chakrabarty to sing "Isaiyil Thodanguthamma" and also writing the lyrics for the same. Chennai Online wrote, "The album, with its rich acoustic score, is one of his [Ilaiyaraaja's] best efforts". S R Ramakrishna of The Music Magazine wrote "Ilaiyaraja's score brings back the grandeur, allusiveness and haunting beauty of his best work. Hey Ram is an exciting album".

Tamil version
No.	Title	Lyrics	Singer(s)	Length
1.	"Ram Ram"	Kamal Haasan	Kamal Haasan, Shruti Haasan
2.	"Nee Partha"	Kamal Haasan, Jibanananda Das	Asha Bhosle, Hariharan, Rani Mukherjee
3.	"Pollatha Madhana Paanam"	Vaali, Jagdish Khebudkar	Mahalakshmi Iyer, Anupama Deshpande
4.	"Vaaranam Aayiram (Vaishnava Janatho)"	Narsinh Mehta, Andal, Gnanakoothan	Kanapadikal, Vibha Sharma
5.	"Isaiyil Thodanguthamma"	Ilaiyaraaja	Ajoy Chakrabarty
6.	"Sanyaas Mantra"		Kamal Haasan, Hema Malini
7.	"Ramaranalum"	Vaali	Kamal Haasan, Jolly Mukherjee, Hariharan

Hindi version
No.	Title	Lyrics	Singer(s)	Length
1.	"Hey! Ram"	Sameer	Kamal Haasan, Shruti Haasan
2.	"Janmon Ki Jwala" (poem of Jibanananda Das recited by Rani Mukherjee)	Sameer	Asha Bhosle, Hariharan
3.	"Asa Ga Madan Ban Ghusla Kasa"	Sameer, Jagdish Khebudkar	Preeti Uttam, Anupama Deshpande
4.	"Sanyaas Mantra"		Kamal Haasan
5.	"Chahe Pandit Ho"	Sameer	Kamal Haasan, Hariharan, Jolly Mukherjee
6.	"Prem Bann"		Preeti Uttam
7.	"Vaishnav Jana To"	Andal, Gnanakoothan, Sameer	Vibha Sharma
8.	"Har Koi Samjhe"	Sameer	Ajoy Chakrabarty

== Release ==
Hey Ram was released simultaneously in Tamil and Hindi on 18 February 2000. A digitally remastered version of the film was released on 8 November 2019 on Amazon Prime Video. Internationally, the film was screened at the 25th Toronto International Film Festival and at the 2000 Locarno Festival. In 2015, Hey Ram was screened at the Habitat Film Festival. The film was re-released at Sathyam Cinemas on 8 November 2019.

=== Controversies ===
There were protests and press releases by political parties in select centres against the perceived negative depiction of Gandhi.

=== Critical reception ===
Hey Ram received widespread critical acclaim. T. Krithika Reddy from The Hindu wrote, "Live sound, prosthetic make-up (Micheal Westmore), splendid cinematography (Thiru), magnificent art work (Sabu Cyril) and painstakingly designed costumes (Sarika) are some of the other highlights of this magnum opus, which is distinct in style and content...The chemistry between Kamal and Rani is explosive to say the least. Shah Rukh Khan, as usual comes up with an impeccable performance. Vasundhara, as the stoic second wife makes an impressive debut. Naseerudin Shah as Gandhi steals a clear march over the others in supporting roles." Dinakaran wrote, "The starting of 2000 itself has given a great joy to Tamil cinema! A Tamilian has created a film that caters to international standards." Methil Renuka of India Today praised the film's "technical wizardry" and cast performances but called it "difficult to categorize". K. N. Vijiyan of New Straits Times said, "To this writer, the message of the need for unity among various religious faiths was well told by Kamalhaasan". S. Chandramouli of Kalki praised the acting of Kamal Haasan, crisp dialogues, art direction for recreating old times, symbolism but felt other characters speaking different languages gives an impression of watching a film from other language while also felt Kamal who slowly built up his character realistically went hurried with the character's change of heart and concluded saying this film will be enjoyed by urban audience but language will definitely be an issue in villages in spite of that, if this film wins, it will be good for the country and for the world of Tamil cinema. Kala Krishanan Ramesh of Deccan Herald wrote, "Hey Ram is a film not to be missed. For though it`s too long and too simplistic it is part of us, and a landmark for every thinking Indian".

=== Box office ===
The Hindi version of Hey Ram grossed ₹8.91 crore in India and $550,000 overseas.

==== India ====
The Hindi version opened on 18 February 2000 across 115 screens and netted ₹2.39 crore in opening week and ₹5.32 crore lifetime. It was the 35th-highest-grossing film of 2000 in India.

==== Overseas ====
At the overseas box office, the Hindi version grossed $350,000 in opening week and $550,000 lifetime.

== Accolades ==
Ceremony	Category	Nominee(s)	Outcome	Ref.
47th National Film Awards	Best Supporting Actor	Atul Kulkarni	Won	
47th National Film Awards	Best Costume Design	Sarika	Won	
47th National Film Awards	Best Special Effects	Manthra	Won	
48th Filmfare Awards South	Best Actor – Tamil	Kamal Haasan	Won	
46th Filmfare Awards	Best Supporting Actor	Atul Kulkarni	Nominated	
7th Annual Screen Awards	Best Background Music	Ilaiyaraaja	Won	
7th Annual Screen Awards	Best Actor	Kamal Haasan	Nominated	
7th Annual Screen Awards	Best Supporting Actor	Atul Kulkarni	Nominated	
7th Annual Screen Awards	Best Sound Recording	Srivastav	Nominated	
7th Annual Screen Awards	Best Cinematography	Tirru	Nominated	
7th Annual Screen Awards	Best Art Direction	Sabu Cyril	Nominated	
7th Annual Screen Awards	Most Promising Newcomer (Female)	Vasundhara Das	Nominated	
64th Annual BFJA Awards	Most Outstanding Work of the Year	Kamal Haasan	Won	

== See also ==
- List of artistic depictions of Mahatma Gandhi
- List of historical films set in Asia

== Bibliography ==
- Dhananjayan, G. (2014). Pride of Tamil Cinema: 1931–2013. Blue Ocean Publishers. OCLC 898765509.
