= Bishnupur, Nepal =

Bishnupur, Nepal, may refer to one of two Nepalese villages:

- Bishnupur, Bara
- Bishnupur, Mahottari
