= Kalaignar Porkizhi Award =

Annual literature award for Tamil and other language writers

Kalaignar Porkizhi Award or Kalaignar Mu. Karunanidhi Porkizhi Award is an annual literature award bestowed for Tamil and other language writers at book fair organized by the Booksellers and Publishers Association of South India (BAPASI) since 2008. Each award consists of 1 lakh rupee and the fund is managed by donation of 1 crore Rupee in 2007 by M. Karunanidhi.

== Recipients ==
=== Tamil Writer ===
- Tamizhannal 2011
- Dr RM. Periakaruppan 2011

=== Poetry ===
- S. Abdul Rahman 2011
- Erode Tamilanban 2010
- Puviarasu 2008

=== Drama ===
- Prof S.Ramanujam 2011

=== Fiction ===
- C.S.Lakshmi ( Ambai )2011
- Poomani 2014

=== Other Literature ===
- Girish Karnad, (Kannada) 2009
- Arjun Dangle (Marathi) 2011
- Prof. K. Chellappan (English) 2011
