= Bishunpur =

Bishunpur may refer to:

- Bishunpur, Nepal, a town
- Bishunpur block, an administrative unit of Jharkhand, India
  - Bishunpur (Vidhan Sabha constituency)
- Bishunpur, Jaunpur, a village in Uttar Pradesh, India
- Bishunpur block, a community development block in Jharkhand, India
  - Bishunpur, Gumla, a village in Jharkhand, India
- Bishunpur Vishram, village in Uttar Pradesh, India

== See also ==
- Bishnupur (disambiguation)
