= Vishnupuram Ilakkiya Vattam =

Indian literary organization

Vishnupuram Ilakkiya Vattam (Tamil: விஷ்ணுபுரம் இலக்கிய வட்டம்) is a literary organization created by Tamil writer Jeyamohan and his readers and fans. It is named after his noted work Vishnupuram. It is currently based out of Coimbatore in Tamil Nadu, India and is being coordinated by K.V.Arangasamy. It awards the Vishnupuram Award every year.

== Purpose ==
The Vattam was created in 2009 with the purpose of promoting quality literature among the Tamil community in the world and to create attention for high quality writing and writers. To that effect, the organization periodically conducts literary meetups, seminars, conferences and informal gatherings to discuss literary works and other arts.

In 2010, the Vishnupuram Ilakkiya Vattam instituted the annual Vishnupuram Award that recognizes under-recognized stalwarts of Tamil literature.

== Events organized by Vishnupuram Ilakkiya Vattam ==
=== Vishnupuram Award ceremonies ===
- Vishnupuram Award for Aa Madhavan (2010)
- Vishnupuram Award for Poomani (2011), Coimbatore
- Vishnupuram Book Reading Colloquium (2012), Karaikudi
- Vishnupuram Award for poet Devadevan (2012), Coimbatore
- Vishnupuram Award for Srilankan Tamil writer Thelivathai Joseph (2013), Coimbatore
- Vishnupuram Award for poet Gnanakoothan (2014), Coimbatore
- Vishnupuram Award for poet Devathachan (2015), Coimbatore
- Vishnupuram Award for Writer Vannadasan (2016). Coimbatore
- Vishnupuram Award for Writer C.Muthusamy (2017). Coimbatore
- Vishnupuram Award for Writer Raj Gauthaman (2018) Coimbatore
- Vishnupuram Award for poet Abi (Habibullah) (2019) Coimbatore
- Vishnupuram Award for writer Sureshkumara Indrajith (2020) Coimbatore
- Vishnupuram award for poet Vikramadityan (2021) - announced

=== Literary Conferences ===
- Kalapria Padaippukkalam (2010), Coimbatore, Critical review of the creative world of poet Tk Kalapria
- Ooty Poetry Conference (2010), Narayana Gurukulam, Ooty Coimbatore
- Devadevan Poetry Conference (2011), Thiruparappu
- Ooty Conference on Epics (2011), Narayana Gurukulam, Ooty
- Devadevan Poetry Conference (2011), Thiruparappu
- Yuvan Chandrasekhar Poetry Conference (2011), Kanyakumari
- Vishnupuram Book Reading Colloquium (2012), Karaikudi
- Ooty Literature Conference (2012), Narayana Gurukulam, Ooty
- Kalpetta Narayanan Poetry Conference (2012), Alappuzha
- Literature Conference (2013), Yercaud
- Conference on Venmurasu (2014), Munnar
- Ooty Literature Conference (2014), Narayana Gurukulam, Ooty

=== Felicitation Events ===
- Nanjilnadan Felicitation (2011), Chennai
- Felicitation event for writer Poomani on winning the Sahitya Academy Award (2015), Chennai

=== Others ===
- Venmurasu books release event (2014), Chennai
