= Karuvelam Pookkal =

1996 film directed by Poomani

- Title card
- Directed by: Poomani
- Written by: Poomani
- Starring: Nasser; Radhika; Thalaivasal Vijay; Charle
- Cinematography: Thangar Bachan
- Edited by: B. Lenin; V. T. Vijayan
- Music by: Ilaiyaraaja
- Production companies: National Film Development Corporation of India; Doordarshan
- Release date: 22 September 2000
- Running time: 130 minutes
- Country: India
- Language: Tamil

Karuvelam Pookkal (transl. Oak flowers) is a 2000 Indian Tamil-language film, directed by Poomani. It was jointly produced by National Film Development Corporation of India, and Doordarshan. The film stars Nasser, Radhika, Thalaivasal Vijay and Charle among others. The film's music is composed by Ilaiyaraaja.

== Cast ==
- Nasser as Nallamuthu
- Radhika as Vadivu
- Charle as Mariappan
- Thalaivasal Vijay as Teacher
- Gandhi Mohan (aka) Shakthi as Thangavelu

== Soundtrack ==
The music composed by Ilaiyaraaja.

Song	Singers	Lyrics	Length
Hey Poothathadi	Uma Ramanan	Pulamaipithan	05:02
Kaalayila Kan	Sujatha	Pulamaipithan	05:06
Nalla Kaalam	M. S. Viswanathan	Ilaiyaraaja	04:49
Pallakku Vanthirukku	Bhavatharini	Pulamaipithan	05:11
Yeale Ada	Ilaiyaraaja	Ilaiyaraaja	04:26

== Reception ==
Malathi Rangarajan of The Hindu wrote, "The fragrance of Karuvelam Pookkal is bound to last in the minds of the discerning audience. A film that makes you think".

== Awards and screenings ==
The film won the Tamil Nadu State Film Award Special Prize in 1996.

The film was screened at the Zanzibar International Film Festival in 1998.
