= Agnaadi =

Book by Poomani

- Author: Poomani
- Language: Tamil
- Genre: Fiction, History
- Publisher: Crea Publications
- Publication place: India
- Pages: 1066
- Award: Sahitya Akademi Award for Tamil literature (2014)
- ISBN: 9788192130217

Agnaadi is a fictional historical novel written by Tamil writer Poomani. Set in the 19th century, it deals with the lives of people from the Kalingal, Kazhugumalai, Chatrapatti, Veppankadu, Chinnaiahpuram, and Sivakasi region over a span of 170 years. The novel revolves around the caste conflicts and discrimination among the different castes of the area, such as the Vannars, Devendrakula Velalars, Panaiyeri Nadars and Thevars.

The title is an expression that signifies many emotions such as relief, wonder, fatigue and resignation.

== Plot ==
The story starts with Aandi or Kalingalaandi son of a farmer returning after giving the lunch to his mother. On his return, Aandi falls into quicksand and rescued by Maari a son of a washer-man. Both Aandi and Maari becomes friends.

Aandi after growing up, marries Karuppi and the couple works together in the farm field. The couple's work in the farm field is highly regarded in the neighboring villages and Aandi is specially known for his technique in sow seeding. Meanwhile, Maari helps his father in laundry. Maari marries Anandhi and on the same day as Karuppi gives birth to Raakan. Soon after the marriage, Anandhi gives birth to Marudhan and Allaathi.

After the death of Maari's parents, Anandhi helps Maari in laundry and she goes to the village to collect "kothu" (a price asked for goods and services). Karuppi gives birth to Veerama after a long period since Raakan's birth. Veeramma grows up naughtily and Karuppi is very much fond of her. Maari realizes that he is unable to work due to his illness and stays at home. Anandhi looks after Maari and also the laundry with the help of their son Marudhan. Maari dies in spite of the treatment. Anandhi after the death of her husband, intends to leave the village to settle in her parents' place, but Aandi advises them to stay in the village.

Karuthayyan is a warrior in a neighboring village to Kalingal. Veeramma falls in love with Karuthayyan after watching him singing and taking bath in their well. Karuthayyan whom never interested in marriage, ties knot with Veeramma after Nondiyan's (Karuthayyan's uncle) recommendation.

Aandi's friend Periya Nadar, a Panayeri Nadar in Kazhugumalai has a son Ammamuthu and a daughter Maalayamma. Sanmugam has two brothers, they die after fighting each other due to conflicts created and fueled by their wives. Sanmugam cremates his brothers and flee out of the place to Kazhugumalai with his pregnant wife. Sanmugam and Malayamma name their son as Thangaiah. After living in Kazhugumalai and helping Ammamuthu in his business for a while, Sanmugam wants to move and pursue own business. Ammamuthu introduces him to Aandi who accommodates him in his home and gives Sanmugam his palm grove to look after.

Later, Kalingal and its surrounding regions faces dry and famine. People of the region dies without food and water. The novel goes on to explain the burial customs and unveils that the corpses were buried in a separate hole initially, then slowly one small hole for the family and then ended up digging a big hole for all those die on that particular day. It also painfully explains that people who helped bringing the corpses to the burial ground died right there and happened to be buried along with the corpses they carried in their shoulders. Veeramma, Sanmugam and Malayamma dies of famine.

Karuppi falls ill and dies.

The era set in the novel is one of the dark period when certain caste people were not allowed in temples. The discrimination of castes such as Nadar leads them to change their religion and living place.

== Main characters ==
- Aandi or Kalingalaandi
- Karuppi (Aandi's wife)
- Maari
- Anandhi (Maari's wife)
- Karuthayyan
- Raakan (Aandi's Son)
- Marudhan (Maari's Son)
- Veeramma (Aandi's daughter and Karuthayyan's wife)
- Poyyaali

== Awards ==
Agnaadi received the 2014 Sahitya Akademi Award for Tamil literature, and the 2012 Gitanjali Literary Prize for Indian author.
