= Raj Gauthaman =

Indian Tamil intellectual (1950–2024)

- ராஜ் கௌதமன்
- Born: 14 February (or) 25 August 1950; W. Pudupatti, composite Ramanathapuram district, Madras State (now Virudhunagar district, Tamil Nadu), India
- Died: 13 November 2024 (aged 74); Tirunelveli, Tamil Nadu, India
- Education: Annamalai University
- Occupations: Writer, Cultural critic, Historian, Academic
- Spouse: K. Parimala
- Children: Nivedha
- Relatives: Bama (younger sister)
- Writing career
- Language: Tamil
- Years active: 1980s–2024
- Genres: Cultural criticism, History, Literary theory
- Subjects: Tamil culture, Dalit studies, Subaltern historiography
- Movement: Tamil Dalit Movement

Susairaj Pushparaj (14 February / 25 August 1950 – 13 November 2024), known as Raj Gauthaman, was an Indian Tamil intellectual who pioneered new approaches to Tamil cultural and literary history studies in the late 20th century. He authored 20 research works that analyse the development of Tamil culture from ancient to modern periods with a focus on subaltern Dalit perspectives. He also wrote three novels and translated Sanskrit works into Tamil. Raj Gauthaman was a part of the core group of writers and thinkers, many of whom were Dalits, which shaped the thinking of the influential journal, Nirapirikai in the early 1990s. He worked in academia before retiring in 2011.

Gauthaman was awarded the Pudhumaipithan Ninaivu Virudhu by the Canadian and American Tamil diaspora in 2018. He was awarded the Vishnupuram Award for 2018 by the Vishnupuram Ilakkiya Vattam for his significant contributions to the Tamil literary and cultural domain.

== Biography ==
He was born Pushparaj on 14 February 1950 in W. Pudupatti, a town near Srivilliputhur in present-day Virudhunagar district of Tamil Nadu. His mother was Sebasthiamma and father was Susairaj. His younger sister Bama later went on to become an acclaimed Tamil feminist writer.

Pushparaj obtained elementary education in Pudhupatti (along with his classmate Mark Stephen, who later became a Catholic priest-activist). He then completed high school education in Madurai. He attended St. Xavier's College, Palayamkottai and received graduate degree in Zoology and post-graduate degree in Tamil literature. He then attended Annamalai University and received a post-graduate degree in sociology. He completed his PhD based on research on writer A. Madhaviah.

He was associated with government arts colleges in Pondicherry, and was lastly the Head of the Tamil Department at the Kanchi Mamunivar Centre for Postgraduate Studies in Lawspet, Puducherry. and retired in 2011. His wife's name is K. Parimalam, and his daughter is Dr Nivedha.

Gauthaman wrote the foreword to Bama's first collection of stories, Kusumbukkaran.

He cited among his formative influences the works of Friedrich Nietzsche, Mikhail Bakhtin, Ranajit Guha, and Michel Foucault.

== Career ==
=== Early works ===
Gauthaman was closely associated with the wave of Dalit political thought and writing that rose in the 1980s in India and in Tamil Nadu. He published essays and articles that analyzed Tamil culture in subaltern perspectives through a Marxian approach. The energy of Tamil Dalit movement and Gauthaman's distinct contribution to it is captured in two widely cited early works, Dalit Panpaadu (Dalit Culture, 1993) and Dalit Paarvaiyil Tamil Panpaadu (Tamil Culture from a Dalit Perspective, 1994). He also published Iyothee Thassar Ayvugal on scholar Iyothee Thass and Aram Adhikaram. Marxist scholars like N Muthumohan praise the works for their blend of Marxian analysis and satire.

Writer and critic Jeyamohan in his introductory note for the Vishnupuram Award contends that while his early works projected critical intensity and satire, they generally lacked the integrity of his later works. Jeyamohan remarks that Raj Gauthaman should primarily be known as one of the three stalwarts of Tamil literary history studies.

Dalit Paarvaiyil Tamil Panpaadu (1994) argues that analyzed carefully from below, mainstream Tamil culture reveals itself, not as a unified expression of Tamil achievement, but as comprising heterogeneous strands. It is in many ways a critique of the canonized non-Brahmin version of the Tamil past. Gauthaman's narrative is interrupted at specific points by an ordinary Dalit who brings in the freshness of a local dialect to question and comment on the account. At one point the Dalit interlocutor asks why students are never taught these things. The answer, 'they say such things are not interesting; literature has to be appreciated and enjoyed; it is not politics,' opens out onto another major achievement of these books and of the Nirapirikai group — the repositioning of literary and cultural texts outside the confines of the aesthetic.

In the mind of a Hindu of any hegemonic caste, the identity of Dalits is treated as a negative identity. As though it is natural, he treats his identity as positive and that of the Dalit as opposed to his. While he draws pleasure from the fact that he is not born an untouchable, he is full of fear and anxiety that he might become one. As a result, whenever a Dalit tries to improve his status, the caste Hindu is anxious that this will usurp his positive identity and, in its place, impose the Dalit's negative identity on him. This anxiety transforms his fear into anger. The Hindu is unable to free himself from such caste psychology... He is willing to sacrifice anything but his caste purity. He lives burdened by the fear that the lower castes will sully his caste purity at any time. For him, protecting his caste purity is more important than partaking in class identity. This is why the wealthy and landed hegemonic Hindus are able to prevent the petty bourgeoisie among the middle castes, and the agrarian working class among the lower castes and Dalits, from unifying as a class. They are able to safeguard their class interests by setting one caste against the other.

— "Dalit Culture" in No Alphabet in Sight: New Dalit Writing from South India Vol.I, Ed. Satyanarayana and Tharu

=== Later phase ===
Jeyamohan classifies Raj Gauthaman's works in the post-2000 period as more rounded and reflecting the balance necessary to explore ancient Tamil history and culture.

Pattum Thogaiyum Tholkappiyamum Thamizh Samooga Uruvakkamum traced the cultural foundations of Tamil society through Tamil Sangam literature and Tholkappiyam. It explored how Tamil society consolidated its patterns of 'righteousness based hegemony', and how it used power to create prevailing social hierarchies over time.

Aakol Poosalum Perungarkaala Nagarigamum analyzed how the tribal society transformed into the urban village of the Sangam area, and how those boundaries slowly got blurred, affecting the lives and equations of participants on both sides. It charted unexplored areas on how wars gave way to games of cattle robbery, the changing role of the bards and pleasure women and the funerary customs of megalithic versus 'civilized' era.

Aarambakatta Mudhalaliyamum Thamizh Samooga Uruvakkamum describes and explores the late 19th century social and cultural milieu where those social groups which collaborated with the British rule were allowed to experience private land and property ownership. This included Dalit social groups which were newly unencumbered from slavery and started to enjoy property rights and urban mobility.

Raj Gauthaman's novel Siluvairaj Sarithiram was a satirical take on society through the eyes of a Dalit across twenty five years of his life. It is written in an autobiographical style and describes Siluvai's encounters with political, social and religious institutions.

== Death ==
Gauthaman was living in Tirunelveli, where he died on the early morning of 13 November 2024, at the age of 74.

== Bibliography ==
=== Research and criticism ===
- A Madhavaiah
- Enbadhugalil Thamizh Kalaacharam(1992)
- Dalit Panpaadu (Dalit Culture, 1993)
- Dalit Paarvaiyil Tamil Panpaadu (Tamil Culture from a Dalit Perspective, 1994)
- K Iyothee Thassar ayvugal, research on early Dalit activist Iyothee Thassar
- Aram Adhikaram
- Dalitiya Vimarsana Katturaigal (2003)
- Pattum Thogaiyum Tholkappiyamum Thamizh Samooga Uruvakkamum (2008)
- Thamizh Samoogathil Aramum Aatralum (2008)
- Aakol poosalum Perungarkaala Naagarigamum (2010)
- Aarambakatta Mudhalaliyamum Thamizh Samooga Uruvakkamum (2010)
- Kanmoodi Vazhakkam Ellam Manmoodi Poga
- Kalithogai Paripaadal: Oru Vilimbunilai Nokku
- Pudhumaipithan Ennum Brahmaraakshas
- Poi + Abatham = Unmai
- Penniyam: Varalarum Kotpadugalum
- Pathitruppatthu Aingurunooru
- Pazhanthamizh Agaval Padalgalin Parimatram
- Sundara Ramasamy: Karuthum Kalaiyum
- Vallalarin Aanmeega Payanam

=== Fiction ===
- Siluvairaj Sarithiram
- Kaalachumai (2003)
- Londonil Siluvairaj

=== Translation ===
- Vilimbunilai Makkalin Porattangal (translated into Tamil, from the original by Ranajit Guha and Susie Tharu)
- Kilikkathaigal Ezhupathu (translation of Śukasaptati, Seventy Tales of the Parrot)
- Anbu Enum Kalai
- Kathakosa: Samana Kathaigal
