= Marudhanayagam =

Unfinished Tamil film by Kamal Haasan

- Launch poster, c. 1997
- Directed by: Kamal Haasan
- Written by: Kamal Haasan; Sujatha
- Produced by: Kamal Haasan
- Starring: Kamal Haasan
- Cinematography: Ravi K. Chandran
- Music by: Ilaiyaraaja
- Production company: Raaj Kamal Films International
- Country: India
- Language: Tamil

Marudhanayagam (/məruðənɑːjəɡəm/) is an unfinished Indian historical drama film directed and produced by Kamal Haasan under his Raaj Kamal Films International banner. The script was co-written by Haasan, along with novelist Sujatha, and the pair started work on the project in late 1991. Following a test shoot in mid-1997, the film was officially launched at a ceremony held at MGR Film City, Chennai during October 1997.

Touted to be the most expensive film to be produced in India during that period, the film had a proposed budget of ₹80 crores. The film had originally pulled together several prominent names across Indian cinema as its principal cast and crew. The music for the film was composed by Ilaiyaraaja with cinematography handled by Ravi K. Chandran.

Despite beginning its shoot in 1997, the film went through various production troubles and eventually an international company, that had been co-producing the film, backed out. After becoming delayed in 1999, the film has not continued production despite numerous attempts at reviving the project.

== Cast ==
- Kamal Haasan as Maruthanayagam Pillai
- Vishnuvardhan as Wajid Khan
- Sathyaraj
- Nassar
- Amrish Puri
- Naseeruddin Shah
- Pasupathy
- Babu as Natarajan
- R. C. Sakthi

== Production ==
=== Development ===
Following the release of Gunaa (1991), Kamal Haasan had considered directing a historical film and contemplated doing a period musical on the lines of Ambikapathy (1937), with the idea of making a film which had only verses for dialogue. Writer Sujatha then suggested Haasan to look at Khan Saibu Sandai (The War of Khan Sahib), a folk ballad edited by Tamil scholar Vanamamalai, which introduced them to the historical figure of Muhammed Yusuf Khan, an 18th-century warrior. Haasan agreed to the prospect and felt that the story had the potential to make a good historical film, with the appeal of depicting the rise from the nadir to the top of Khan's life. Sujatha revealed that nearly 80% of the film would be adapted from Samuel Charles Hill's biography of Khan, also known as Marudha Nayagam, and to only use imagination where no solid or substantial information was available, such as on matters concerning his conversion to Islam. The team continued their research and developed the script of the film for four years. For the first time in India, the team planned to use a computer for screenplay writing, using a particular software called the Movie Magic Screenwriter with Sujatha working as a screenplay doctor. French screenwriter Jean-Claude Carrière and Haasan's mentor Ananthu were also involved in readying the screenplay for the film, as were historian S. Muthiah and poets Puviarasu and Gnanakoothan.

In April 1997, Kamal Haasan confirmed that he had begun finalising work on Marudhanayagam, suggesting it would be the most expensive Indian film ever made. To widen the potential business of the film into the Hindi-speaking regions of India, Kamal Haasan chose to spend most of mid-1997 directing the Hindi film Chachi 420 (1997), his first straight Hindi film in twelve years.

Through discussion with the British Deputy High Commission in Chennai, the producers brought in Queen Elizabeth II to appear as the chief guest at the launch of the project, which took place in the MGR Film City on 16 October 1997. The Queen spent 20 minutes on the sets of the film, with Tamil Nadu Chief Minister M. Karunanidhi, politicians S. Jaipal Reddy and G. K. Moopanar, journalist and veteran actor Cho Ramaswamy and veteran actors Sivaji Ganesan and Amrish Puri also in attendance. A teaser was shown at the launch, with a pilot video consisting of a battle scene which would feature for a few minutes in the film, with the production of the particular scene costing Kamal Hassan ₹1.5 crores alone. In November 1997, it was reported that the film would cost almost ₹85 crores to make and would subsequently become the most expensive Indian film production till then. The music for the trailer of the film was composed by Karthik Raja in late 1997, when Kamal Haasan and he were working together in Kaathala Kaathala.

=== Casting ===
The original cast included veteran Kannada actor Vishnuvardhan playing the role of Wajid Khan, with supporting actors Nassar, Naseeruddin Shah, Om Puri and Amrish Puri also given pivotal roles. Om Puri pulled out of the film in mid-1998 due to prior commitments and Sathyaraj replaced him in the film. When the film was postponed, the team were still waiting to hear back from actors Amitabh Bachchan and Rajinikanth who were approached to play guest roles. The latter was approached to portray the Maratha ruler, Pratap Singh of Thanjavur. The team approached Napoleon to play a role in the film, but his unavailability led to actor Pasupathy being cast in his first film role. The actor, who has since gone on to appear in successful films, was set to feature in the role of an antagonist and had shot for five days. Babu, an actor who became paralysed after a stunt accident in the early 1990s, was cast in the role of a disabled nobleman. Furthermore, actor Pasupathy Raj and actor-director R. C. Sakthi were signed on to essay other supporting roles.

Kate Winslet was offered the lead female role of Marsha, but her rejection led to the makers considering other options. British casting director Priscilla John joined the team to assist with European casting. Haasan and his brother Chandrahasan visited France to audition European actors and were able to shortlist individuals to portray the lead actress and the main antagonist. Screenwriter Jean-Claude Carrière accompanied Haasan to further auditions in London, where actors were selected to play characters including that of Stringer Lawrence. To physically prepare for his own role, Haasan went on a diet by eating only eggs, fruits and vegetables.

The technical team included costume designer Sarika, Kamal Haasan's wife at the time of production. The make-up duties for the film were shared between Michael Westmore and his apprentice Barry Cooper, with the pair training several Indian make-up artistes during the film's pre-production stages. The graphics of the film were produced by Pentafour Software, whose work had been critically acclaimed in Shankar's Jeans (1998). Sabu Cyril was appointed head of art direction, with Prabhaharan and GK being two of his assistants, while director Sundar K. Vijayan, R. S. Shivaji, and G. N. R. Kumaravelan were signed on as second unit directors. Actor Daniel Balaji briefly also worked on the sets as a unit production manager, having initially set out to work as a second unit director. Vikram Dharma worked on the stunt choreography for the film, alongside an English stunt technician Jerry Crompton.

Ravi K. Chandran was signed on ahead of P. C. Sriram and Santosh Sivan as cinematographer for the film, heading a team including apprentices Ravi Varman and Keshav Prakash, while dancer Birju Maharaj was announced as the choreographer. Photographer Sruthi Ramakrishnan partook in the film's early promotional shoots, and was brought to Chennai from Bangalore, while S. Muthukumar served as the film's still photographer during the filming process. Karate expert Shihan Hussaini helped provide security for Kamal Haasan during the making of the project. It was announced that music composing would be a collaborative effort between Ilaiyaraaja and Andrew Lloyd Webber with prominent Carnatic singer, M. S. Subbalakshmi also singing for the film. Classical violinist L. Subramaniam had turned down the opportunity to compose the background score for the film, with Ilaiyaraaja subsequently replacing him. Prominent percussionist Zakir Hussain had also discussed working on the film with Kamal Haasan, but eventually did not sign the project.

=== Pre-production and design ===
Costume designer Sarika had begun researching accessories for the film from the early 1990s, soon after the project's inception. With the assistance of V. S. Chandralekha, the Commissioner of Tamil Nadu Archives and Historical Research, she began to put together outfits, uniforms, shoes and headgear of soldiers of the 1700s. Sarika and art director Sabu Cyril travelled to London and Paris to learn about English and French outfits from the period, and collaborate with French historians on the project. The pair visited war museums in London, photocopied books and collected archived material written by historical figures such as Warren Hastings, one of the founders of the British Empire. For the preparation of jewellery props, Sarika used metal dyes on silver, copying 18th century designs and original photographs of South Indian Nawabs.

For a test shoot in Jaipur, Rajasthan during mid-1997, Sarika arranged up to 7,400 costumes and accessories to be ready, and the filming took place at the cost of ₹1 crore. Sarika arranged costumes to reflect British and French army officials, as well as Hindu and Muslim fighters. For the artwork in the film, Sabu Cyril attempted to gather as many cannons, guns and shields available from the period as possible. Chandran later noted that, in the absence of easy access to computer-generated imagery in the late 1990s, the sheer number of extras cast during the test shoot created logistical difficulties for maintaining crowd control and getting individuals ready for shoot.

During the test shoot, palmyra trees and other vegetation were used to recreate the fauna of the Ramanathapuram district. The team also booked out over 200 acres of land near Irungattukottai and Sriperumbudur to potentially use for battle scenes. To train the cinematography team, Chandran recruited staff members who had worked on international films such as Gandhi (1981) and A Passage to India (1984). Remote-control cameras were also used, with the technology available being the most prolific in Indian films to date.

=== Filming ===
At the launch ceremony, the inaugural shot was filmed with Kamal Haasan, in the persona of Marudhanayagam, hearing and reacting to an imperial announcement read out by the character played by Nassar, with Om Puri's character looking on. Official filming began several months later in Velangudi on 10 August 1998 with a scene of where a companion of the lead character, played by Kamal Haasan, is hanged prompting a brief altercation. The first schedule lasted until October 1998 and involved over a thousand extras, while actors such as Pasupathy also partook in the shoot.

The film ran into production trouble in November 1998, when a sector of the Tamil community alleged that the film would contain historical misinterpretations of one of the community's historical icons. Furthermore, another section argued that the film is a distortion of history and that the central character would be portrayed as a hero of the struggle against the British instead of the traitor they felt he was. The allegations prompted Kamal Haasan to abandon extensive sets erected in Karaikudi, in interior Tamil Nadu, and shift to Chalakudy, in Kerala, to continue work on the project. Action sequences showing Kamal Haasan moving a large rock and battling rivals, were shot in and around Athirappilly Falls. Further scenes featuring Indian classical musicians and dancers were shot in Chromepet in Chennai. By the end of the initial shoot phase, 23 days of shoot had been finished, with 30 minutes of running time completed.

=== Delay ===
I need not only the money but also a powerful distribution network from the west to take hold of it and release it properly because it is an English, French, Tamil film. That is the virtue of the film and it has to be done like that. It is not a project that I can sell and walk away. I can start anytime on this project as I already have the first 30 minutes of it ready. I need to ready another two hours of content.

— Kamal Haasan, on reviving Marudhanayagam

Works on Marudhanayagam suddenly ceased in late 1998, after a British company that had planned to co-produce the film, backed out on account of India's Pokhran-II nuclear bomb test explosions. The film has been indefinitely postponed since. Haasan announced in November 1999 that shooting will resume in six months after contracts of the technicians and actors were sorted, adding that a French version of the film will also be released, though work eventually did not restart. He had invested ₹8 crores of his own wealth into the project.

Haasan met American producers during his visit to Los Angeles in June 2006 to try to find a financier for the film, but talks were unfruitful. In June 2008, Haasan suggested that the film would be revived after the completion of his directorial venture, Marmayogi, but within months, Marmayogi was shelved after pre-production. A two-minute soundless trailer of the film surfaced on the internet in January 2008, with IndiaGlitz claiming that there are "scenes which have the grandeur that stuns you instantly" and that "the visuals are astonishing."

Haasan announced that he intended on restarting work on the film in 2012, mentioning that the film could be made within a budget of ₹150 crores, and may feature contemporary leading actor Rajinikanth in another role. Reports again suggested in 2013 that Haasan would resume the film in 2014 following the completion of his directorial venture, but reports were once again baseless. In 2014, filmmaker Keyaar made a public call to Fox Star Studios and other large production companies to consider reviving the project. Kamal Haasan revealed that Allirajah Subaskaran of Lyca Productions had expressed interest in financing the project during late 2015, but restarting the venture would involve extensive pre-production works and he would collaborate with Lyca Productions on a different venture first.

The posters of the film were displayed at the 2017 Cannes Film Festival, signalling the film's possible revival. However, in February 2018, Haasan revealed that he would only work on two more films before his proposed retirement from acting, Vishwaroopam II and Indian 2. In 2020, Haasan stated that he had by now aged considerably to play the lead role, so if the project were to be revived it would necessitate storyline changes or recasting of his role. At the 56th International Film Festival of India in 2025, he expressed more optimism over reviving the project due to advances in technology. In 2026, Atlee expressed interest in reviving the project.

== Music ==
Ilaiyaraaja was signed on to score music for the film's soundtrack, while his son Karthik Raja composed the background music for the film's promotional trailer in late 1997. Initially Kamal Haasan planned to bring in prominent British film composer Andrew Lloyd Webber to compose the background music, while Ilaiyaraaja took in charge of composing the songs, suggesting that it will be a collaborative effort between the two composers. Later classical violinist L. Subramaniam was also brought to compose the film score, but he turned down the opportunity which made Ilaiyaraaja to take charge of composing the background score and the soundtrack.

Despite the project being shelved, Ilaiyaraaja finished composing two songs for the film in late 1998. One of the songs were sung by prominent M. S. Subbulakshmi, and another song was titled "Poranthathu Panaiyur Mannu" which was composed and sung by Ilaiyaraaja. At an award ceremony held in Chennai, both Kamal Haasan and Ilaiyaraaja sang few lines from this song, which prompted fans requesting to release the full song online. The song was released directly in YouTube (as both audio and video formats). The video song featured some footages of the sequences which were filmed during the initial phase of the production and few scenes from the film's trailer as well.

External audio
- Official Audio Song on YouTube

Track listing
No.	Title	Lyrics	Singer(s)	Length
1.	"Poranthathu Panaiyur Mannu"	Kamal Haasan	Ilaiyaraaja	2:46

== Legacy ==
The delay of the film has been subject to references in media and film. In Saroja (2008), the character played by Premgi Amaren stumbles upon a supposed DVD of Marudhanayagam. In Siva Manasula Sakthi (2009), Santhanam's character mockingly asks for a song from the shelved film to be played on the radio. In Anbanavan Asaradhavan Adangadhavan (2017), a poster of the film appears in the background of a scene, alongside other prominent shelved Tamil films such as Manmadhan 2 and Karikalan.
