= Fariba Hachtroudi =

French-Iranian journalist and writer (born 1951)

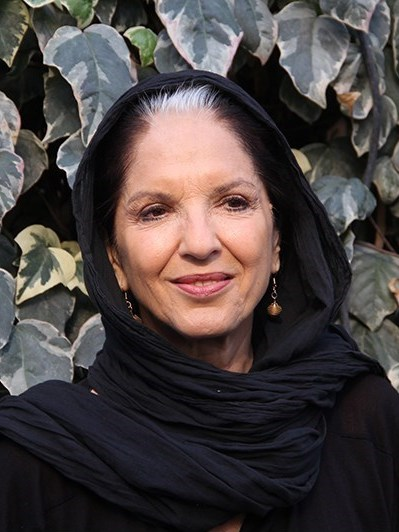
Portrait of Fariba Hachtroudi

Fariba Hachtroudi (Hashtroodi) (Persian: فریبا هشترودی; born 1951 in Teheran) is a French-Iranian journalist and writer.

== Early life ==
Fariba Hachtroudi is the daughter of Mohsen Hashtroodi, a prominent Iranian mathematician, and Robab Hashtroodi, a professor of humanities and Persian literature. Sheikh Ismail Hashtroodi was her grandfather.

In 1963, Hachtroudi moved to France. She trained as an archaeologist, receiving her doctoral degree in 1978.

== Career ==
Early in her journalistic career, Hachtroudi covered the Iran–Iraq War.

Following the Iranian Revolution, Hachtroudi began writing polemics against Khomeini and the religious authorities in Iran. Between 1981 and 1983, she lived in Sri Lanka, teaching at Colombo University.

In 1985, she entered Iran secretly via Baluchistan and travelled around the country, investigating the consequences of the Revolution and the Iran–Iraq War on life in the country. Her first book, L’exilée, describes her experiences.

From 1995, Hachtroudi has led the humanitarian and cultural organisation Mohsen Hachtroudi (MoHa), an initiative of which is the Gitanjali Literary Prize.

Hachtroudi's first novel, Iran, les rives du sang, was awarded the French Republic's Human Rights Prize in 2001.

== Selected works ==
=== Non-fiction ===
- L'Exilée. Paris: Payot. 1991. ISBN 978-2-228-88387-0.
- Les Femmes iraniennes : vingt-cinq ans d'inquisition islamiste. Cahors: Éditions L'Hydre. 2004. ISBN 978-2-913703-42-1.
- À mon retour d'Iran... Paris: Éditions du Seuil. 2008. ISBN 978-2-02-094322-2.
- Khomeyni Express : Itinéraires clandestins en République islamique d'Iran. Vevey: Xenia Éditions. 2009. ISBN 978-2-88892-072-4.
- La gelée royale. Paris: Éditions Encre d'Orient. 2010. ISBN 978-2-36243-001-5.
- Ali Khamenei ou Les larmes de Dieu. Paris: Éditions Gallimard. 2011. ISBN 978-2-07-013316-1.

=== Novels ===
- Iran, les rives du sang. Paris: Éditions du Seuil. 2000. ISBN 978-2-02-038689-0.
- J'ai épousé Johnny à Notre-Dame-de-Sion. Paris: Éditions du Seuil. 2006. ISBN 978-2-02-088799-1.
- Le colonel et l'appât 455. Paris: Albin Michel. 2014. ISBN 2226254250.

=== Poetry ===
- Abysses. Éditions Chèvre-feuille étoilée. 2013. ISBN 978-2-36795-006-8.

=== In English translation ===
- Twelfth Iman's a Woman?. Translated by Robyns, Sian. Key Publishing House. 2011. ISBN 9781926780054.
- The Man Who Snapped His Fingers. Translated by Anderson, Alison. Europa Editions. 2016. ISBN 9781609453060.
