= Joydeb Halder =

Indian politician

Member of the West Bengal Legislative Assembly
- In office 2011–Present
- Preceded by: Tapati Saha
- Constituency: Mandirbazar

Personal details
- Party: Trinamool Congress

Joydeb Halder is an Indian politician. He was elected as MLA of Mandirbazar Vidhan Sabha Constituency in West Bengal Legislative Assembly in 2011 and 2016. He is an Trinamool Congress politician.
