= Parsa Pateli =

Parsa Pateli पर्सा पटेली
- Village development committee
- Location in Nepal
- Coordinates: 26.62°N 85.82°E
- Country: Nepal
- Zone: Janakpur Zone
- District: Mahottari District

Population (1991)
  - Total: 2,958
- Time zone: UTC+5:45 (Nepal Time)

Parsa Pateli is a village development committee in Mahottari District in the Janakpur Zone of south-eastern Nepal. At the time of the 1991 Nepal census it had a population of 2958 people living in 515 individual households.

Parsa-Pataili VDC consists of four separate villages: Parsa, Pataili, Chauria, and Bishnupur. Parsa, Pataili, and Bishnupur have two wards each while Chauria has three wards. The villages bishnupur has population of 1200. Many young peoples from Bishnupur works in Middle east countries as well as in Malaysia. A few families have been migrated to the United States of America for study/Job. Parsa-pataili is also the birthplace of two member of parliament in Nepalese parliament.
