= Gitanjali Literary Prize =

- Awarded for: Franco-Indian literary award
- Hosted by: Mohsen Hachtroudi Foundation; CHG Earth Group
- First award: 2012
- Final award: Active

The Gitanjali Literary Prize is a Franco-Indian literary award established in 2012. It was founded by the Mohsen Hachtroudi Foundation and CHG Earth Group (a hotel company in India). A Francophone author and an Indian author each receive a prize which includes a Gitanjali Medal, a literary sojourn of 15 days, and a translation of the work. The French book will be edited in India by an Indian editor and the book in any of the Indian languages will be published by a French editor. Any Francophone country is eligible as are many of the major Indian regional languages. The prize is open to all works and genres that correspond to the theme of the year. The prize is named for the collection of poems Gitanjali (1910) by Nobel-laureate Rabindranath Tagore.

Fariba Hachtroudi is a Francophone writer of Iranian origin, President of the MoHa Foundation and co-founder of the prize, she said: "The prize has two aims: to contribute to the promotion of the French language in India and also to the promotion of Indian works in France. Works by noted Indian writers not only in English, but in other regional languages like Hindi, Tamil, Kannada, Malayalam and Bengali will also be eligible."

== Winners and nominees ==
Blue ribbon = winners

2012 Theme: Resistance, Independence, Freedom

- Indian: Poomani, Agnaadi (Tamil)
  - T.K. Rama, V Positive (Malayalam)
  - Manisha Kulshreshtha, Shigaf (Hindi)
- Francophone: Lyonel Trouillot, Une Belle Amoure Humaine (Haiti)
  - Cécile Oumhani, L’atelier des streson (France)
  - Khaled Osman, Le Caire a corps perdu (France)
