= Mandirbazar (community development block) =

Community Development Block in West Bengal, India

- Community Development Block
- Location of Mandirbazar community development block in South 24 Parganas district
- Coordinates: 22.1633°N 88.3258°E
- Country: India
- State: West Bengal
- Division: Presidency
- District: South 24 Parganas
- Subdivision: Diamond Harbour
- Headquarters: Mandirbazar

Government
  - Gram Panchayats: Anchana, Chandpur, Dakshin Bishnupur, Dhanurhat, Gabberia, Ghateswar, Jagadishpur, Kecharkur, Krishnapur, Nisapur
  - Lok Sabha constituencies: Mathurapur
  - Vidhan Sabha constituencies: Mandirbazar

Area
  - Total: 118.07 km^{2} (45.59 sq mi)

Population (2011)
  - Total: 214,050
  - Density: 1,812.9/km^{2} (4,695.4/sq mi)
  - Urban: 25,055

Demographics
  - Literacy: 75.89 per cent
  - Sex ratio: 944 ♂/♀

Languages
  - Official: Bengali
  - Additional official: English
- Time zone: UTC+05:30 (IST)
- Website: s24pgs.gov.in

Mandirbazar is a community development block that forms an administrative division in Diamond Harbour subdivision of South 24 Parganas district in the Indian state of West Bengal.

== Geography ==

Mandirbazar CD block is located at 22°09′48″N 88°19′33″E. It has an average elevation of 7 metres (23 ft).

Mandirbazar CD block is bounded by Magrahat I and Magrahat II CD blocks in the north, Jaynagar I and Jaynagar II CD blocks in the east, Mathurapur I CD block in the east and south, Kulpi CD block in the west.

South 24 Parganas district is divided into two distinct physiographic zones: the marine-riverine delta in the north and the marine delta zone in the south. As the sea receded southwards, in the sub-recent geological period, a large low-lying plain got exposed. Both tidal inflows and the rivers have been depositing sediments in this plain. The periodical collapse of both the natural levees and man-made embankments speed up the process of filling up of the depressions containing brackish water wetlands. The marine delta in the south is formed of interlacing tidal channels. As non-saline water for irrigation is scarce, agriculture is monsoon dominated. Some parts of the wetlands are still preserved for raising fish.

Mandirbazar CD block has an area of 118.07 km^{2}. It has 1 panchayat samity, 10 gram panchayats, 159 gram sansads (village councils), 112 mouzas and 110 inhabited villages, as per the District Statistical Handbook, South Twenty-four Parganas. Sadasibpur village is located partly in Magrahat I and partly in Mandirbazar CD block. Mandirbazar police station serves this CD Block. Headquarters of this CD block is at Mandirbazar.

Gram Panchayats of Mandirbazar CD block/Panchayat Samiti are: Anchana, Chandpur, Dakshin Bishnupur, Dhanurhat, Gabberia, Ghateswar, Jagadishpur, Kecharkur, Krishnapur and Nisapur.

== Demographics ==
=== Population ===
As per the 2011 Census of India, Mandirbazar CD block had a total population of 214,050, of which 188,995 were rural and 25,055 were urban. There were 110,105 (51%) males and 103,945 (49%) females. Population below 6 years was 29,752. Scheduled Castes numbered 90,955 (42.49%) and Scheduled Tribes numbered 31 (0.01%).

As per the 2001 Census of India, Mandirbazar CD block had a total population of 183,093, out of which 94,627 were males and 88,466 were females. Mandirbazar CD block registered a population growth of 14.54 per cent during the 1991-2001 decade. Decadal growth for South 24 Parganas district was 20.89 per cent. Decadal growth in West Bengal was 17.84 per cent. Scheduled Castes at 85,077 formed about one-half the population. Scheduled Tribes numbered 1,547.

Census Towns in Mandirbazar CD block (2011 census figures in brackets): Chandpur (M) (6,777), Bangsidharpur (M) (5,218) and Purba Bishnupur (13,060).

Large villages (with 4,000+ population) in Mandirbazari CD block (2011 census figures in brackets): Sadashibpur (10,935), Nilambarpur (K) (8,636), Purba Gopalnagar (K) (4,231), Mallikpratap (M) (9,462), Tekpanza (M) (9,107), Nishapur (M) (5,427) and Lakshmikantapur (4,642).

Other villages in Mandirbazar CD block include (2011 census figures in brackets): Krishnapur (3,594), Gabberia (1,590), Chaitanyapur (886), Dhaurhat (823) and Ghateshwar (2,430).

=== Literacy ===
As per the 2011 census, the total number of literates in Mandirbazar CD block was 139,868 (75.89% of the population over 6 years) out of which males numbered 78,647 (82.93% of the male population over 6 years) and females numbered 61,221 (68.44% of the female population over 6 years). The gender disparity (the difference between female and male literacy rates) was 14.49%.

As per the 2011 Census of India, literacy in South 24 Parganas district was 77.51 Literacy in West Bengal was 77.08% in 2011. Literacy in India in 2011 was 74.04%.

As per the 2001 Census of India, Mandirbazar CD block had a total literacy of 65.99 per cent for the 6+ age group. While male literacy was 77.83 per cent female literacy was 53.29 per cent. South 24 Parganas district had a total literacy of 69.45 per cent, male literacy being 79.19 per cent and female literacy being 59.01 per cent.

See also – List of West Bengal districts ranked by literacy rate

Literacy in CD blocks of
South 24 Parganas district
Alipore Sadar subdivision
Bishnupur I – 78.33%
Bishnupur II – 81.37%
Budge Budge I – 80.57%
Budge Budge II – 79.13%
Thakurpukur Maheshtala – 83.54%
Baruipur subdivision
Baruipur – 76.46%
Bhangar I – 72.06%
Bhangar II – 74.49%
Jaynagar I – 73.17%
Jaynagar II – 69.71%
Kultali – 69.37%
Sonarpur – 79.70%
Canning subdivision
Basanti – 68.32%
Canning I – 70.76%
Canning II – 66.51%
Gosaba – 78.98%
Diamond Harbour subdivision
Diamond Harbour I – 75.72%
Diamond Harbour II – 76.91%
Falta – 77.17%
Kulpi – 75.49%
Magrahat I – 73.82%
Magrahat II – 77.41%
Mandirbazar – 75.89%
Mathurapur I – 73.93%
Mathurapur II – 77.77%
Kakdwip subdivision
Kakdwip – 77.93%
Namkhana – 85.72
Patharpratima – 82.11%
Sagar – 84.21%
Source: 2011 Census: CD Block Wise
Primary Census Abstract Data

=== Language ===
Languages of Mandirbazar CD block (2011)
1. Bengali (99.8%)
2. Hindi (0.13%)
3. Urdu (0.02%)
4. Others (0.01%)

At the time of the 2011 census, 99.84% of the population spoke Bengali, 0.13% Hindi and 0.02% Urdu as their first language.

=== Religion ===
Religion in Mandirbazar CD block (2011)
Hinduism	62.03%
Islam	37.65%
Other or not stated	0.32%

In the 2011 Census of India, Hindus numbered 132,770 and formed 62.03% of the population in Mandirbazar CD block. Muslims numbered 80,599 and formed 37.65% of the population. Others numbered 681 and formed 0.32% of the population. In 2001, Hindus and Muslims were 65.79% and 33.91% of the population respectively.

The proportion of Hindus in South Twenty-four Parganas district has declined from 76.0% in 1961 to 63.2% in 2011. The proportion of Muslims in South Twenty-four Parganas district has increased from 23.4% to 35.6% during the same period. Christians formed 0.8% in 2011.

== Rural poverty ==
As per the Human Development Report for South 24 Parganas district, published in 2009, in Mandirbazar CD block the percentage of households below poverty line was 29.90%, a moderate level of poverty. In the north-east and mid central portion of the district, all CD blocks, with the exception of Kulpi CD block, had poverty rates below 30%. As per rural household survey in 2005, the proportion of households in South 24 Parganas with poverty rates below poverty line was 34.11%, way above the state and national poverty ratios. The poverty rates were very high in the Sundarbans settlements with all thirteen CD blocks registering poverty ratios above 30% and eight CD blocks had more than 40% of the population in the BPL category.

== Economy ==
=== Livelihood ===
Livelihood
in Mandirbazar CD block
1. Cultivators (8.83%)
2. Agricultural labourers (27.5%)
3. Household industries (6.70%)
4. Other Workers (57.0%)

In Mandirbazar CD block in 2011, amongst the class of total workers, cultivators numbered 6,232 and formed 8.83%, agricultural labourers numbered 19,406 and formed 27.49%, household industry workers numbered 4,728 and formed 6.70% and other workers numbered 40,227 and formed 56.98%. Total workers numbered 70,593 and formed 32.98% of the total population, and non-workers numbered 143,457 and formed 67.02% of the population.

The District Human Development Report points out that in the blocks of region situated in the close proximity of the Kolkata metropolis, overwhelming majority are involved in the non-agricultural sector for their livelihood. On the other hand, in the Sundarban region, overwhelming majority are dependent on agriculture. In the intermediate region, there is again predominance of the non-agricultural sector. Though the region is not very close to Kolkata, many places are well connected and some industrial/ economic development has taken place.

Note: In the census records a person is considered a cultivator, if the person is engaged in cultivation/ supervision of land owned by self/government/institution. When a person who works on another person's land for wages in cash or kind or share, is regarded as an agricultural labourer. Household industry is defined as an industry conducted by one or more members of the family within the household or village, and one that does not qualify for registration as a factory under the Factories Act. Other workers are persons engaged in some economic activity other than cultivators, agricultural labourers and household workers. It includes factory, mining, plantation, transport and office workers, those engaged in business and commerce, teachers, entertainment artistes and so on.

=== Infrastructure ===
There are 110 inhabited villages in Mandirbazar CD block, as per the District Census Handbook, South Twenty-four Parganas, 2011. 100% villages have power supply. 106 villages (96.36%) have drinking water supply. 31 villages (21.18%) have post offices. 99 villages (90.00%) have telephones (including landlines, public call offices and mobile phones). 34 villages (37.26%) have pucca (paved) approach roads and 30 villages (27.27%) have transport communication (includes bus service, rail facility and navigable waterways). 8 villages (7.27%) have agricultural credit societies and 3 villages (2.73%) have banks.

=== Agriculture ===
South 24 Parganas had played a significant role in the Tebhaga movement launched by the Communist Party of India in 1946. Subsequently, Operation Barga was aimed at securing tenancy rights for the peasants. In Mandirbazar CD block 1,097.89 acres of land was acquired and vested. Out of this 413.42 acres or 37.66% of the vested land was distributed. The total number of patta (document) holders was 2,116.

According to the District Human Development Report, agriculture is an important source of livelihood in South Twentyfour Parganas district. The amount of cultivable land per agricultural worker is only 0.41 hectare in the district. Moreover, the irrigation facilities have not been extended to a satisfactory scale. Agriculture mostly remains a mono-cropped activity.

As per the District Census Handbook, the saline soil of the district is unfit for cultivation, but the non-salty lands are very fertile. While rice is the main food crop, jute is the main cash crop.

In 2013–14, there were 26 fertiliser depots, 3 seed stores and 44 fair price shops in Mandirbazar CD block.

In 2013–14, Mandirbazar CD block produced 18,679 tonnes of Aman paddy, the main winter crop, from 9,149 hectares, 2,084 tonnes of Boro paddy (spring crop) from 747 hectares, 2446 tonnes of potatoes from 73 hectares. It also produced pulses and oilseeds.

=== Pisciculture ===
In Mandirbazar CD block, in 2013–14, net area under effective pisciculture was 377 hectares, engaging 3,940 persons in the profession, and with an approximate annual production of 17,730 quintals.

Pisciculture is an important source of employment in South 24 Parganas district. As of 2001, more than 4.5 lakh people were engaged in Pisciculture. Out of this 2.57 lakhs were from the 13 blocks in the Sundarbans settlements.

=== Banking ===
In 2013–14, Mandirbazar CD block had offices of 6 commercial banks and 1 gramin banks.

=== Backward Regions Grant Fund ===
South 24 Parganas district is listed as a backward region and receives financial support from the Backward Regions Grant Fund. The fund, created by the Government of India, is designed to redress regional imbalances in development. As of 2012, 272 districts across the country were listed under this scheme. The list includes 11 districts of West Bengal.

== Transport ==
Mandirbazar CD block has 3 originating/ terminating bus routes. 7 bus routes have ceased to operate.

Madhabpur and Lakshmikantapur are stations on the Sealdah South section.

== Education ==
In 2013–14, Mandirbazar CD block had 131 primary schools with 12,735 students, 10 middle schools with 1,402 students, 12 high schools with 5,265 students and 12 higher secondary schools with 7,691 students. Mandirbazar CD block had 1 general degree college with 6,431 students and 291 institutions for special and non-formal education with 12,852 students.

See also – Education in India

As per the 2011 census, in Mandirbazar CD block, amongst the 110 inhabited villages, 12 villages did not have a school, 33 villages had two or more primary schools, 20 villages had at least 1 primary and 1 middle school and 23 villages had at least 1 middle and 1 secondary school.

== Healthcare ==
In 2014, Mandirbazar CD block had 1 rural hospital and 6 private nursing homes with total 57 beds and 10 doctors (excluding private bodies). It had 25 family welfare subcentres. 1,089 patients were treated indoor and 27,348 patients were treated outdoor in the hospitals, health centres and subcentres of the CD block.

As per 2011 census, in Madirbazar CD block, 4 villages had community health centres, 1 village had a primary health centre, 24 villages had primary health subcentres, 7 villages had maternity and child welfare centres, 4 villages had veterinary hospitals, 13 villages had medicine shops and out of the 110 inhabited villages 41 villages had no medical facilities.

Naiyarat Rural Hospital at Naiyarat, with 30 beds, is the major government medical facility in Mandirbazar CD block. (As per state government website, there is no primary health centre in this block)
