= Ratwara =

Coordinates: 25°01′N 76°57′E

Ratwara Bhasepur Ratwara, Vishnupur Ratwara
- village
- Interactive map of Ratwara
- Country: India
- State: Bihar
- District: Sitamarhi

Languages
  - Official: Maithili, Hindi
- Time zone: UTC+5:30 (IST)
- PIN: 843333
- Telephone code: 916228
- ISO 3166 code: IN-BR
- Nearest city: Sitamarhi
- Lok Sabha constituency: Sitamarhi
- Vidhan Sabha constituency: Bajpatti

Ratwara a village in Sitamarhi district of Bihar, India also known as Vishnupur Ratwara or Bishunpur Ratwara.

== About ==
The village comes under Bajpatti block. Ratwara is about 14 km east of Sitamarhi district headquarters (Dumra) and about 10 km west of Janakpur Road a.k.a. Pupri. Ratwara is well connected by road to Sitamarhi and Pupri. The nearest railway station is Bajpatti (about 6 km) and the nearest airport is Darbhanga (about 60 km). The postal code is 843333. People from this village are spread across different parts of India like Bangalore, Mumbai, Delhi, etc.

== Education ==
The village has four middle schools including one Urdu Vidayalaya and education is available up to 8th standard.

== Local festivals ==
Major festivals celebrated in Ratwara -

- Holi,
- Durga Puja,
- Diwali,
- Chhath.

== Fruits ==
- Maldah or Langda Mango,
- Litchi.
