= Vikramadityan =

Tamil poet and writer

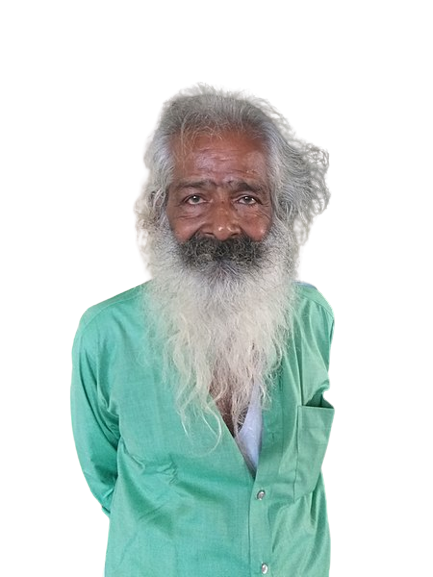
The poet Vikramadityan

Vikramadityan (born 25 September 1947) is a Tamil poet from the Indian state of Tamil Nadu. He has published 16 volumes of poetry, two short-story collections, and 7 anthologies of essays. He is the recipient of the 2021 Vishnupuram Award.

== Life and career ==
Vikramadityan's given name is Nambirajan. He was born and brought up in the Kallathi Mudukku street area of Tirunelveli town. He adopted an itinerant lifestyle early on and has lived in Kutralam, Tenkasi and Chennai. He is married and has two sons.

Vikramadityan took up various kinds of jobs as he grew up. One of his first jobs was with the literary journal Sodhanai run by the poet Na. Kamarasan. Later he worked for a series of magazines including Visitor, Aswini, Mayan, Idhayam Pesukiradhu, Thaai, Tharasu and Nakkheeran.

He has published 16 poetry collections including Aakaasam neela niram, Oorum Kaalam and Ulvaangum Ulagam. He has also published two short story collections and 7 collections of articles on literature and other topics.

Vikramadityan has acted in small roles in the movies Angadi Theru and Naan Kadavul. He was awarded the 2008 Vilakku virudhu award and the 2021 Vishnupuram Award.

== Works ==
Poetry Collections

- Aakaasam neela niram (1982)
- Oorum kaalam (1984)
- Ulvaangum ulagam (1987)
- Ezhutthu sol porul (1988)
- Thiru-uttharakosamangai (1991)
- Gragayuddham (1993)
- Aadhi (1997)
- Kal thoongum neram (2001)
- Nooru ennuvadharkul (2001)
- Veedu thirumbudhal (2001)
- Vikramadityan kavidhaigal (2001)
- Paadhi iruttu paadhi velicham (2002)
- Sudalaimaadan varai (2003)
- Dhevadhaigal - Perunthevi - Mohini pisaasu (2004)
- Sekar cycle shop (2007)
- Vikramadityan kavidhaigal - II

Short story collections

- Thiribu (1993)
- Avan aval (2003)

Articles & Essay collections

- Kavimoolam (1999)
- Kavidhai rasanai (2001)
- Iruveru ulagam (2001)
- Tamil kavidhai - marabum naveenamum (2004)
- Thanmai munnilai padarkkai (2005)
- Enakkum en dheivathukkum idaiyeyana vazhakku (2007)
- Ellaach chollum (2008)
- Tharkaala sirandha kavidhaigal
- Gangothri
- Sollidil ellai illai
- Saayal enappaduvadhu yaadhenin
- Summaa irukkavidaadha kaatru
- Kavidhaiyum katthirikkayum
- Oozh
- Mahakavigal rathotsavam

== Awards ==
- Vilakku virudhu (2008)
- Saaral virudhu (2014)
- Vishnupuram Award (2021)
