= Bishunpur Vishram =

Village in Uttar Pradesh

- Village
- Interactive map of Bishunpur Vishram
- Country: India
- State: Uttar Pradesh
- District: Balrampur
- Tehsil: Tulsipur

Language
  - Official: Hindi
  - Additional official: Urdu
- Postal code: 271206

Bishunpur Vishram is a village in Pachperwa block, Balrampur district, Uttar Pradesh, India.

== Demographics ==
As of 2011 Indian Census, Bishunpur Vishram had a total population of 2,405, of which 1,196 were males and 1,209 were females.
