= Bishnupur Rural Municipality, Siraha =

Bishnupur विष्णुपुर
- Rural Municipality
- Location in Nepal
- Coordinates: 26.83°N 86.36°E
- Country: Nepal
- Province: Province No. 2
- District: Siraha District
- Established: 2073

Government
  - Chariperson: Satya narayan Yadav
  - Vice-Chariperson: Arhula Devi Singh

Population (2011)
  - Total: 18,522
- Time zone: UTC+5:45 (Nepal Time)
- Postal code: 56500
- Area code: 033
- Website: http://www.bishnupurmunsiraha.gov.np/

Bishnupur is a rural municipality in Siraha District in Province No. 2 of south-eastern Nepal. At the time of the 2011 Nepal census it had a population of 18,522 people living.
