= Poomani =

Indian writer (1947–2026)

- Born: 1947; Andipatti,Tinnevelly, Madras Province, British India (now Tuticorin district, Tamil Nadu), India
- Died: 12 July 2026 (aged 79); Chennai, Tamil Nadu, India
- Occupations: Novelist; short story writer
- Writing career
- Language: Tamil
- Subject: Literature
- Notable works: Piragu; Vekkai; Varappugal; Vaaikkal
- Notable awards: Sahitya Akademi Award (2014)

Poomani (1947 – 12 July 2026) was an Indian writer and novelist. He wrote about the lives of ordinary people in the karisal bhoomi, the rain-fed black-soil tracts of southern Tamil Nadu.

Poomani won the Sahitya Akademi award in 2014 in the Tamil language category for his novel Agnaadi. Poomani's novel Vekkai was adapted into the film Asuran (2019) which brought wider attention to his work.

== Life and career ==
Poomani was born in 1947 into a family of marginal farmers in Andipatti, a village near Kovilpatti. He was born Manickavasagamm; Poomani is a pen name he adopted early in his career.

In his youth, Poomani was enchanted by the stories he heard around him growing up, as told by his mother and in his community. As a young man, the works of Ki. Rajanarayanan, a senior writer from Kovilpatti, inspired Poomani to take up writing. According to Poomani, KiRa combined in his writing "the scent of the soil with the natural flow of life's energies to enable the writing to develop its own traits, instead of borrowing from other models". He was also influenced by P. Kesavadev's Malayalam novel, Ayalkar, published in English as The Neighbours (1979). Poomani found in Ayalkar a worthy model: "It is a strong story, told with an aesthetic narrative style and keen imagination. The imagination adds lustre to the nature of the story, instead of dominating it. Changes and values arise anew on their own. The narration brings many things alive for the reader, carries him to the terrain of the story and stands him there. It makes him walk alongside, cry and laugh. When everything is wrapped up at the end, it makes him think."

Poomani's historical novel Agnaadi (January 2012) has been called "a landmark work". It covers a period of more than 170 years from the beginning of the 19th century, revolving mainly around the lives and fortunes of several families dispersed over villages in the region: Kalingal, Kazhugumalai, Chatrapatti, Veppankadu, Chinnaiahpuram and Sivakasi. The families are from a range of castes (Devendrakula Velalars, Vannaars, Panaiyeri Nadars, Naickers and Thevars) and occupations (farmers, washermen, toddy-tappers, landed squires and warriors). Poomani received a 28-month study and research grant from the Indian Foundation of the Arts in Bengaluru to study the history of the novel. The novel won the inaugural Gitanjali Literary Prize.

His Vekaai was translated from Tamil to English by N. Kalyan Raman and published as Heat (2019) by Juggernaut Books.

Poomani's debut novel Piragu, one of the pioneering subaltern novels of Tamil Nadu, was translated into English by T. Marx and published as And Then by Emerald Publishers (December 2019). Poomani's short story "Thakanam" was translated into English by T Marx and published in the journal Indian Literature as "Cremation".

He directed the award-winning movie Karuvelam Pookkal (1996) for NFDC.

Poomani died after a prolonged illness in Chennai, on 13 June 2026, at the age of 79. Chief Minister C. Joseph Vijay announced that he would be accorded State honours.

== Awards ==
- 1996: Tamil Nadu State Film Award Special Prize for the film Karuvelam Pookkal (dir. Poomani)
- 2011: Vishnupuram Award for his contribution to literature
- 2012: Gitanjali Literary Prize for Agnaadi
- 2014: Sahitya Akademi Award for Agnaadi

== Bibliography ==
Novels

- Agnaadi
- Piragu
- Vekkai
- Varappugal
- Vaaikkal
- Neivethiyam
- Kommai

Short story collections

- Vayirugal
- Reethi
- Norungalkal

Film

- Karuvelam Pookkal

== See also ==
- List of Sahitya Akademi Award winners for Tamil
- List of Indian writers
- List of Tamil-language writers
