= W. Pudupatti =

W.Pudupatti Watrap Puduppatti Puthupatti, Watrap Puduppatti, Vathirayiruppu Pudupatti, etc
- Town
- Location in Tamil Nadu, India
- Coordinates: 9°36′56″N 77°38′9″E
- Country: India
- State: Tamil Nadu
- District: Virudhunagar

Population (2001)
  - Total: 7,846

Languages
  - language: Tamil, Telugu
- Time zone: UTC+5:30 (IST)
- Postal code: 626116
- Website: www.wpudupatti.com

W.Pudupatti is a panchayat town in Virudhunagar district, Tamil Nadu. It is under Srivilliputtur Assembly constituency and Tenkasi LokSabha constituency.

== Demographics ==
As of 2010 India census, W.Pudupatti had a population of 14,846. Males constituted 48% of the population and females 52%. W.Pudupatti has an average literacy rate of 74%, higher than the national average of 60%: male literacy is 76%, and female literacy is 72%. In W.Pudupatti, 12% of the population is under 6 years of age.

Most of its residents are farmers.

== Location ==
- Wikmapia
