= Puviarasu =

Indian Tamil poet and translator (1930–2026)

Puviyarasu
- Born: S. Jagannathan; 1930; Lingavanayakkanputhur, Madras Province, British India (now Coimbatore district, Tamil Nadu, India)
- Died: 30 June 2026 (aged 96); Coimbatore, Tamil Nadu, India
- Education: Government Arts College, Coimbatore
- Occupations: Poet, translator
- Spouse: Mrs.Jegadhambal
- Children: 1 son and 2 daughers.
- Writing career
- Pen name: Puviyarasu
- Language: Tamil
- Subject: Literature
- Notable awards: Sahitya Akademi Award (2009)

Puviarasu (or Puviyarasu; 1930 – 30 June 2026) was an was a Sahitya Akademi Award winning Tamil poet and translator from Tamil Nadu.

== Biography ==
Puviyarasu was born in a Lingavanayakkanputhur village near Udumalpet in 1930. His birth name was S. Jagannathan. Puviyarasu is the Tamil translation of the Sanskritic "Jagannathan". His family moved to and settled in Coimbatore. He obtained his intermediate degree from Government Arts College, Coimbatore and his Tamil Vidwan degree from Thavathiru Santhalinga Adigalar Arts,Science and Tamil College, Perur. He worked as a Tamil teacher for more than thirty years. He was married to Jagadambal. He had a son(deceased) and two daughters.

== Literary career ==
Puviyarasu first started publishing in 1952. He was a Marxist by political orientation and was an opponent of Dravidian parties. He was imprisoned for his participation in agitations for making Tamil the administrative language of Tamil Nadu and the border agitations. He was one of the founders of the short-lived Vanambadi literary movement. In his literary career he published more than 80 books. He also translated the works of Shakespeare, Khalil Gibran, Omar Khayyam, Osho, Dostoevsky and Rabindranath Tagore into Tamil. Some of his poems have been translated into English, Russian, Hungarian, Malayalam, Kannada, Hindi and Sinhalese. In 2007 he won the Sahitya Akademi Translation Prize for his poem Puratchikaaran – translation of Kazi Nazrul Islam's The Revolutionary. In 2010, he was awarded the Sahitya Akademi Award for his poetry collection Kaioppam (lit. The Signature). The charitable trust Puviyarasu Tamil Valarchi Mayyam (started for training Tamil teachers properly) has been named after him. He lived in Coimbatore.

== Death ==
Puviarasu died on 30 June 2026 due age-related ailments at his home in the age of 96. He was laid to rest with full Tamilnadu state honours.

== Bibliography ==
=== Poetry ===
- Kaioppam (கையொப்பம்)
- Oru Mukiya Arivippu (ஒரு முக்கிய அறிவிப்பு)
- Ettu thisai kaatru (எட்டுத்திசைக் காற்று)
- Meeral (மீறல்)
- Thenmozhi (தேன்மொழி)
- Kavithaikenna veli (கவிதைக்கென்ன வேலி)
- Pasiththa sindhanai (பசித்த சிந்தனை)
- Thirumana Parisu (திருமணப் பரிசு)
- Ithuthan (இதுதான்)
- Pullanguzhale (புல்லாங்குழலே)
- Mukkoodal (முக்கூடல்)

=== Tamil Translations ===
- The Book of Mirdad by Mikhail Naimy](மிர்தாதின் புத்தகம்)
- The Memoirs of a Vagrant Soul or the Pitted Face (Mudhakkirāt al-ʾArqaš) by Mikhail Naimy (அம்மை வடுமுகத்து ஒரு நாடோடி ஆத்மாவின் நினைவுக் குறிப்புகள்)
- Broken Wings (Al-ajniḥa al-mutakassira) novel by Kahlil Gibran (முறிந்த சிறகுகள்)
- The Prophet by Kahlil Gibran (தீர்க்கதரிசி)
- The Treasured Writings of Kahlil Gibran by Kahlil Gibran (கலீல் ஜிப்ரானின் பொன்மணிப் புதையல்)
- The Wisdom of Kahlil Gibran by Kahlil Gibran (ஞானக் களஞ்சியம்)
- The Garden of the Prophet by Kahlil Gibran (ஞானிகளின் தோட்டம்)
- Rubaiyat by Omar Khayyam (உமர்கய்யாமின் ருபாயத்)
- The Brothers Karamazov by Fyodor Dostoevsky (கரமசோவ் சகோதரர்கள்)
- Poor Folk(Bednye lyudi) by Fyodor Dostoevsky (பாவப்பட்டவர்கள்)
- Morning and Evening Thoughts by James Allen (காலை மாலை சிந்தனைகள்)
- Hamlet by William Shakespeare (ஹாம்லெட்)
- Othello by William Shakespeare (ஒதெல்லோ)
- Romeo and Juliet by William Shakespeare (ரோமியோ ஜூலியட்)
- Dracula by Bram Stoker (டிராகுலா)
- Frankenstein by Mary Shelley (பிராங்கன்ஸ்டைன்)
- The Invisible Man by H. G. Wells (மாயமனிதன்)
- Bidrohi (The Rebel) - Kazi Nazrul Islam by Kabir Chowdhury (காஸி நஸ்ரூல் இஸ்லாமின் புரட்சிக்காரன்)
- The Days of My Years - Autobiography of Har Prasad Nanda (நந்தா: எஸ்கார்ட்ஸ் தொழிலதிபரின் சுயசரிதம்)

=== Drama ===
- Manidhan (மனிதன்)
- Moondram pirai (மூன்றாம் பிறை)
- Shakthi - Moondru Naveena Nadagangalசக்தி (மூன்று நவீன நாடகங்கள்)

=== Essay ===
- Antha Kadaisi Nalgal (அந்தக் கடைசி நாள்கள்)
- Vellai Maligai Ragasiyangal (வெள்ளை மாளிகை ரகசியங்கள்)
- Vazhlkai uyarthum Sinthanaigal (வாழ்வை உயர்த்தும் சிந்தனைகள்)
- Marupadiyum (மறுபடியும்)
- Dhayavuseidhu idhai padikkaadheergal (தயவுசெய்து இதைப் படிக்காதீர்கள்)
- En ullam kavar kamal (என் உள்ளம் கவர் கமல்)

=== Short Story ===
- Meendum Zen Kathaigal (மீண்டும் ஜென் கதைகள்)
- Athe Nila (அதே நிலா - சங்க இலக்கியக் கதைகள்)
- Theerpu (தீர்ப்பு)

=== Others ===
- Zen Buddhar Thaayumanavar (ஜென் புத்தர் தாயுமானவர்)
- Marainthirukkum Unmaigal Osho (மறைந்திருக்கும் உண்மைகள்)
- Konjam Yosikkalaamaa? {கொஞ்சம் யோசிக்கலாமா?}

== Awards and recognitions ==
- Sahitya Akademi Translation Prize (2007)
- Kalaignar Porkizhi Award (2008)
- Sahitya Akademi Award for Tamil (2009)
- Sahitya Puraskar Award from Kerala Cultural Centre

== Books ==
His books are available as ebooks.

== See also ==
- List of Sahitya Akademi Award winners for Tamil
- List of Indian writers
- List of Tamil-language writers
