= Bishnupur Rural Municipality, Saptari =

Bishnupur बिष्णुपुर
- Rural Municipality (Gaunpalika)
- Location in Nepal
- Coordinates: 26.50°N 86.70°E
- Country: Nepal
- Zone: Sagarmatha Zone
- District: Saptari District
- Established: 2073

Population (2021)
  - Total: 27,703
- Time zone: UTC+5:45 (Nepal Time)
- Postal code: 56400
- Area code: 031
- Website: http://www.bishnupurmunsaptari.gov.np/

Bishnupur is a rural municipality in Saptari District in the Sagarmatha Zone of south-eastern Nepal. At the time of the 2021 Nepal census it had a population of 27,703 people living in 5465 individual households.
