= Bishnupur, Mahottari =

Village in Nepal

Bishnupur is one of the four villages under the Parsa Pateli village development committee of Mahottari district in the Janakpur Zone of southern Nepal. Bishnupur is located at 2.5 miles southeast of Jaleshwor, the district headquarters. Bishnupur is surrounded by the Indian border in the south, Chauria village in the southeast, Pataili in the northeast, Suga in the north, and Masurpatti village in the west. The towns of Matihani (Nepal) and Madhwapur (India) are 1.5 miles from Bishnupur.

The estimated population of Bishnupur according to the 2011 census is 1200 persons. Many young people from Bishnupur have been working in the Middle East, as well as in Malaysia. There has been immigration to the United States for work and education.
