= Vishnupuram Award =

Indian award for Tamil literature

- Awarded for: Outstanding contributions to Tamil literature
- Location: Coimbatore, Tamilnadu
- Country: India
- Presented by: Vishnupuram Ilakkiya Vattam
- First award: 2010
- Currently held by: Sureshkumara Indrajith (2020)
- Website: www.jeyamohan.in

Vishnupuram Award is a literary award instituted by Vishnupuram Ilakkiya Vattam, the literary organization created by writer Jeyamohan and his readers. The award was named after the writer's famous novel in Tamil, Vishnupuram. This award was initiated to honour the under-recognized pioneers and senior writers in Tamil literature. This contains cash award of Rs 1,00,000 and a memento, a book on the author will be published and a documentary on the awardee release during the occasion.

== Recipients ==
- A Madhavan (2010)
- Poomani (2011)
- Devadevan (2012)
- Thelivathai Joseph (2013)
- Gnanakoothan (2014)
- Devathachan (2015)
- Vannadhasan (2016)
- C.Muthusamy (2017)
- Raj Gauthaman (2018)
- Abi (Habibullah) (2019)
- Sureshkumara Indrajith (2020)
- Poet Vikramadityan (2021)
- Charu Nivedita (2022)
- Yuvan Chandrasekar (2023)
- Era Murugan (2024)
