= Mandirbazar =

- Village
- Location in West Bengal Location in India
- Coordinates: 22.1633°N 88.3258°E
- Country: India
- State: West Bengal
- District: South 24 Parganas
- CD Block: Mandirbazar
- Elevation: 7 m (23 ft)

Languages
  - Official: Bengali
  - Additional official: English
- Time zone: UTC+5:30 (IST)
- PIN: 743395
- Telephone code: +91 3174
- Vehicle registration: WB-19 to WB-22, WB-95 to WB-99
- Lok Sabha constituency: Mathurapur (SC)
- Vidhan Sabha constituency: Mandirbazar (SC)
- Website: www.s24pgs.gov.in

Mandirbazar is a village within the jurisdiction of the Mandirbazar police station in the Mandirbazar CD block in the Diamond Harbour subdivision of the South 24 Parganas district in the Indian state of West Bengal.

== Geography ==
Cities and towns in the eastern part of Diamond Harbour subdivision (including Magrahat I & II, Mandirbazar, Mathurapur I & II CD blocks) in South 24 Parganas district
M: municipal city/ town, CT: census town, R: rural/ urban centre, N: neighbourhood, T: religious centre
Owing to space constraints in the small map, the actual locations in a larger map may vary slightly

=== Area overview ===
Diamond Harbour subdivision is a rural subdivision with patches of urbanization. Only 14.61% of the population lives in the urban areas and an overwhelming 85.39% lives in the rural areas. In the eastern portion of the subdivision (shown in the map alongside) there are 24 census towns. The entire district is situated in the Ganges Delta and the eastern part of the district is a flat plain area with small towns, many in clusters. Location of places in the larger map varies a little. It is an OpenStreetMap, while we are using coordinates as in Google Maps.

Note: The map alongside presents some of the notable locations in the subdivision. All places marked in the map are linked in the larger full screen map.

=== Location ===
Mandirbazar is located at 22.1633°N 88.3258°E.

Mandirbazar is not identified as a separate place in 2011 census. The map of CD block Mandirbazar on page 627 in the District Census Handbook for the South 24 Parganas shows the Madirbazar police station in Krishnadebpur mouza. The same map shows the block headquarters as being located in Ramnathpur. However, West Bengal government has put the location as PO Mandirbazar.

== Civic administration ==
=== Police station ===
Mandirbazar police station covers an area of 128.07 km^{2}. It has jurisdiction over parts of the Mandirbazar CD block.

=== CD block HQ ===
The headquarters of Mandirbazar CD block are located at PO Mandirbazar.

== Transport ==
Mandirbazar stands around the junction points of the Lakshikantapur-Hansuri Road (locally popular as the Diamond Harbour Road/ Sangrampur station Road) and the Hatuganj-Karbala More road (connecting to the National Highway 12 and the State Highway 1).

Mathurapur Road railway station is located nearby.

== Education ==
Jagdishpur Siti Kanta Institution is a Bengali-medium coeducational (boys only?) institution established in 1927. It has facilities for teaching from class V to class XII. It is housed in a government building and has 10 computers.

Mandirbazar Saradeswari Balika Bidyalaya is a Bengali-medium girls only institution established in 1957. It has facilities for teaching from class V to class X. It is housed in a government building.

== Healthcare ==
Naiyarat Rural Hospital at Krishnapur, with 30 beds, is the major government medical facility in the Mandirbazar CD block.
