= Krishnapur, Mandirbazar =

Krishnapur
- Village
- Location in West Bengal Location in India
- Coordinates: 22.1326°N 88.3403°E
- Country: India
- State: West Bengal
- District: South 24 Parganas
- CD block: Mandirbazar

Area
  - Total: 2.36 km^{2} (0.91 sq mi)
- Elevation: 7 m (23 ft)

Population (2011)
  - Total: 3,594
  - Density: 1,520/km^{2} (3,940/sq mi)

Languages
  - Official: Bengali
  - Additional official: English
- Time zone: UTC+5:30 (IST)
- PIN: 743377
- Telephone code: +91 3174
- Vehicle registration: WB-19 to WB-22, WB-95 to WB-99
- Lok Sabha constituency: Mathurapur (SC)
- Vidhan Sabha constituency: Mandirbazar (SC)
- Website: www.s24pgs.gov.in

Krishnapur is a village and a gram panchayat within the jurisdiction of the Mandirbazar police station in the Mandirbazar CD block in the Diamond Harbour subdivision of the South 24 Parganas district in the Indian state of West Bengal.

== Geography ==
Cities and towns in the eastern part of Diamond Harbour subdivision (including Magrahat I & II, Mandirbazar, Mathurapur I & II CD blocks) in South 24 Parganas district
M: municipal city/ town, CT: census town, R: rural/ urban centre, N: neighbourhood, T: religious centre
Owing to space constraints in the small map, the actual locations in a larger map may vary slightly

=== Area overview ===
Diamond Harbour subdivision is a rural subdivision with patches of urbanization. Only 14.61% of the population lives in the urban areas and an overwhelming 85.39% lives in the rural areas. In the eastern portion of the subdivision (shown in the map alongside) there are 24 census towns. The entire district is situated in the Ganges Delta and the eastern part of the district is a flat plain area with small towns, many in clusters. Location of places in the larger map varies a little. It is an OpenStreetMap, while we are using coordinates as in Google Maps.

Note: The map alongside presents some of the notable locations in the subdivision. All places marked in the map are linked in the larger full screen map.

=== Location ===
Krishnapur is located at 22.1326°N 88.3403°E

== Demographics ==
According to the 2011 Census of India, Krishnapur (K) had a total population of 3,594 of which 1,874 (52%) were males and 1,720 (48%) were females. There were 378 persons in the age range of 0–6 years. The total number of literates in Krishnapur was 2,508 (77.99% of the population over 6 years).

== Transport ==
Krishnapur is on the State Highway 1.

Madhabpur railway station is located nearby.

== Education ==
Raghunathpur High School is a Bengali-medium coeducation institution established in 1946. It has facilities for teaching from class VI to class XII.

Anchna High School is a Bengali-medium boys only institution established in 1947, It has facilities for teaching from class V to class XII.

Anchna Balika Bidyalaya is a Bengali-medium girls only institution established in 1966. It has facilities for teaching from class V to class X.

== Healthcare ==
Naiyarat Rural Hospital at Krishnapur, with 30 beds, is the major government medical facility in the Mandirbazar CD block.
