= Mandirbazar Assembly constituency =

Constituency of the West Bengal Legislative Assembly, in India

Mandirbazar
- Constituency No. 135 for the West Bengal Legislative Assembly
- Interactive Map Outlining Mandirbazar Assembly Constituency

Constituency details
- Country: India
- Region: East India
- State: West Bengal
- District: South 24 Parganas
- Lok Sabha constituency: Mathurapur
- Established: 1977
- Total electors: 229,074
- Reservation: SC

Member of Legislative Assembly
- 18th West Bengal Legislative Assembly
- Incumbent Joydeb Halder
- Party: TMC
- Alliance: TMC+
- Elected year: 2026

Mandirbazar Assembly constituency is a Legislative Assembly constituency of South 24 Parganas district in the Indian State of West Bengal. It is reserved for Scheduled Castes.

== Overview ==
As per the order of the Delimitation Commission in respect of the Delimitation of constituencies in the West Bengal, Mandirbazar Assembly constituency is composed of the following:

- Mandirbazar community development block
- Dakshin Lakshminarayanpur, Mathurapur Paschim, Mathurapur Purba and Uttar Lakshminarayanpur gram panchayats of Mathurapur I community development block

Mandirbazar Assembly constituency is a part of No. 20 Mathurapur Lok Sabha constituency.

== Members of the Legislative Assembly ==
Year	Member	Party
1977	Renupada Halder	Socialist Unity Centre of India (Communist)
1982	Subhas Roy	Communist Party of India (Marxist)
1987	Subhas Roy	Communist Party of India (Marxist)
1991	Subhas Roy	Communist Party of India (Marxist)
1996	Nikunja Paik	Communist Party of India (Marxist)
2001	Choudhury Mohan Jatua	Trinamool Congress
2006	Tapati Saha	Communist Party of India (Marxist)
2011	Joydeb Halder	Trinamool Congress
2016	Joydeb Halder	Trinamool Congress
2021	Joydeb Halder	Trinamool Congress
2026	Joydeb Halder	Trinamool Congress

== Election results ==
Vote share of Winning candidates
2026	43.94%
2021	48.04%
2016	52.72%
2011	53.65%
2006	47.91%
2001	49.10%
1996	47.04%
1991	43.92%
1987	45.53%
1982	45.28%
1977	34.95%

=== 2026 ===
2026 West Bengal Legislative Assembly election: Mandirbazar
Party	Candidate	Votes	%	±%
TMC	Joydeb Halder	93,686	43.94	▼4.1
BJP	Mallika Paik	91,691	43.0	▲6.74
ISF	Ashoke Kumar Gayen	21,943	10.29	▼2.44
NOTA	None of the above	1,036	0.49	▼0.42
Majority		1,995	0.94	▼10.84
Turnout		213,229	95.99	▲8.93
TMC hold		Swing		

=== 2021 ===
2021 West Bengal Legislative Assembly election: Mandirbazar
Party	Candidate	Votes	%	±%
TMC	Joydeb Halder	95,834	48.04	▼4.68
BJP	Dilip Kumar Jatua	72,342	36.26	▲31.42
ISF	Sanchay Kumar Sarkar	25,397	12.73	
NOTA	None of the above	1,822	0.91	
Majority		23,492	11.78	
Turnout		199,490	87.06	
TMC hold		Swing		

=== 2016 ===
2016 West Bengal Legislative Assembly election: Mandirbazar
Party	Candidate	Votes	%	±%
TMC	Joydeb Halder	94,339	52.72	▼0.93
CPI(M)	Sarat Halder	69,400	38.78	▼2.90
BJP	Chhandita Mazumder	8,653	4.84	▲2.78
SUCI(C)	Sisir Kumar Mondal	1,848	1.03	New entry
NOTA	None of the above	1,460	0.82	New entry
PDS	Bappa Das	951	0.53	▼0.28
BSP	Tapas Kumar Halder	810	0.45	▼0.62
LJP	Ganesh Halder	788	0.44	New entry
Independent	Sudip Halder	692	0.39	New entry
Majority		24,939	13.94	▲1.97
Turnout		1,78,941	86.62	▲0.69
TMC hold		Swing		

=== 2011 ===
2011 West Bengal Legislative Assembly election: Mandirbazar
Party	Candidate	Votes	%	±%
TMC	Joydeb Halder	83,524	53.65	
CPI(M)	Sarat Halder	64,883	41.68	
BJP	Goutam Naskar	3,209	2.06	
BSP	Soumen Sardar	1,670	1.07	
PDS	Bappa Das	1,263	0.81	
PDCI	Pranab Kumar Paik	1,136	0.73	
Majority		18,641	11.97	
Turnout		1,55,685	85.93	
TMC gain from CPI(M)		Swing		

=== 2006 ===
2006 West Bengal Legislative Assembly election: Mandirbazar (SC)
Party	Candidate	Votes	%	±%
CPI(M)	Dr. Tapati Saha	63,751	47.91	
TMC	Choudhury Mohan Jatua	62,399	46.89	
Independent	Prahlad Kumar Purkait	4,123	3.10	
BSP	Deb Kumar Sanpui	1,416	1.06	
PDS	Bappa Das	1,380	1.04	
Majority		1,352	1.02	
Turnout				
Swing to CPI(M) from TMC		Swing		

=== 2001 ===
2001 West Bengal Legislative Assembly election: Mandirbazar (SC)
Party	Candidate	Votes	%	±%
TMC	Choudhury Mohan Jatua	59,492	49.10	
CPI(M)	Nikunja Paik	52,618	43.43	
Independent	Prahlad Kumar Purkait	3,985	3.29	
BJP	Bidhan Baidya	2,784	2.30	
NCP	Dr. Tapan Kumar Sardar	985	0.81	
PDS	Nalini Kanta Haldar	558	0.46	
BSP	Bhaskar Haldar	493	0.41	
Independent	Kamal Krishna Sardar	247	0.20	
Majority		6,874	5.67	
Turnout		121,860	74.61	
Swing to TMC from CPI(M)		Swing		

=== 1996 ===
1996 West Bengal Legislative Assembly election: Mandirbazar (SC)
Party	Candidate	Votes	%	±%
CPI(M)	Nikunja Paik	57,805	47.04	
INC	Tapan Sardar	55,927	45.51	
Independent	Renupada Halder	5,975	4.86	
BJP	Chaitanya Mohan Jatua	3,187	2.59	
Majority		1,878	1.53	
Turnout		125,874	85.34	
CPI(M) hold		Swing		

=== 1991 ===
1991 West Bengal Legislative Assembly election: Mandirbazar (SC)
Party	Candidate	Votes	%	±%
CPI(M)	Subhas Roy	45,877	43.92	
INC	Sanat Pailk	42,685	40.86	
Independent	Renupada Haldar	9,265	8.87	
Independent	Murari Halder	6,631	6.35	
Majority		3,192	3.06	
Turnout		106,522	79.42	
CPI(M) hold		Swing		

=== 1987 ===
1987 West Bengal Legislative Assembly election: Mandirbazar (SC)
Party	Candidate	Votes	%	±%
CPI(M)	Subhash Roy	40,708	45.53	
INC	Durga Charan Mondal	33,710	37.71	
SUCI(C)	Renupada Halder	13,862	15.51	
Independent	Durgapada Halder	911	1.02	
Independent	Makhan Chandra Baidya	211	0.24	
Majority		6,998	7.82	
Turnout		90,732	77.54	
CPI(M) hold		Swing		

=== 1982 ===
1982 West Bengal Legislative Assembly election: Mandirbazar (SC)
Party	Candidate	Votes	%	±%
CPI(M)	Subhash Chandra Ray	34,832	45.28	
INC	Birendra Nath Halder	23,235	30.20	
SUCI(C)	Renu Pada Halder	18,032	23.44	
JP	Brindaban Gayen	684	0.89	
Independent	Bimal Krishna Halder	144	0.19	
Majority		11,597	15.08	
Turnout		78,612	77.98	
Swing to CPI(M) from SUCI(C)		Swing		

=== 1977 ===
1977 West Bengal Legislative Assembly election: Mandirbazar (SC)
Party	Candidate	Votes	%	±%
SUCI(C)	Renupada Halder	19,151	34.95	
CPI(M)	Subhas Chandra Roy	13,556	24.74	
JP	Brindaban Gayen	12,701	23.18	
INC	Sachin Roy	7,243	13.22	
Independent	Ashit Ranjan Mondal	1,119	2.04	
Independent	Subhas Chandra Biswas	470	0.86	
Independent	Baidyanath Mondal	385	0.70	
Independent	Durga Charan Mondal	172	0.31	
Majority		5,595	10.21	
Turnout		55,515	60.52	
SUCI(C) win (new seat)				
