= Jan Michalski Prize =

Swiss literary prize

Jan Michalski Prize for Literature
- Native name: Prix Jan Michalski
- Sponsored by: Jan Michalski Foundation for Writing and Literature
- Country: Switzerland
- Status: Active
- First award: 2009 (launched)
- Website: https://fondation-janmichalski.com/fr/prix

Jan Michalski Prize for Literature (French: Prix Jan Michalski) is a Swiss literary prize for any work of fiction or non-fiction published anywhere in the world in any language. It is meant to recognize authors from around the world and world literature in general. The jury is multicultural and multilingual in composition.

The award was launched October 2009 and the first winner was announced November 2010. The winner receives CHF 50,000. The authors of finalists are invited for a three-month period of residence in the Maison de l'écriture.

The prize was created by the Jan Michalski Foundation for Writing and Literature (Fondation Jan Michalski pour l’Ecriture et la Littérature), founded in 2004 at the initiative of Vera Michalski-Hoffmann in memory of her husband Jan Michalski. It is located in Montricher, Switzerland.

== Honorees ==
Year	Author	Original title	English, French or German translation	Result	Ref.
2010	(United States) (Bosnia and Herzegovina) Aleksandar Hemon	The Lazarus Project		Winner	
2010	(Saudi Arabia) (Lebanon) Yousef Al-Mohaimeed	فخاخ الرائحة	Wolves of the Crescent Moon	Finalists	
2010	(Australia) Tim Flannery	The Weather Makers		Finalists	
2010	(France) Laurent Binet	HHhH		Nominee	
2010	(Hungary) Péter Esterházy	Harmonia cælestis	Celestial Harmonies	Nominee	
2010	(Austria) Alois Hotschnig	Im Sitzen läuft es sich besser davon		Nominee	
2010	(Ukraine) Viktor Malakhov	Уязвимость любви		Nominee	
2010	(France) Frédéric Martinez	Claude Monet, une vie au fil de l’eau		Nominee	
2010	(Switzerland) Klaus Merz	Der Argentinier		Nominee	
2010	(Russia) Pavel Sanaev	Похороните меня за плинтусом		Nominee	
2011	(Hungary) György Dragomán	A fehér király	The White King	Winner	
2011	(Philippines) Miguel Syjuco	Ilustrado		Finalists	
2011	(Iceland) Sjón	Skugga-Baldur	The Blue Fox	Finalists	
2011	(China) (United States) Liu Xiaobo	—	No Enemies, No Hatred: Selected Essays and Poems	Nominee	
2011	(Sweden) Peter Fröberg Idling	Pol Pots leende	Pol Pot’s Smile	Nominee	
2011	(Russia) Mark Kharitonov	Проект Одиночество		Nominee	
2011	(Poland) Antoni Libera	Godot i jego cień		Nominee	
2012	(United Kingdom) Julia Lovell	The Opium War: Drugs, Dreams and the Making of China		Winner	
2012	(Austria) Martin Pollack	Kaiser von Amerika: Die große Flucht aus Galizien		Finalists	
2012	(United States) Timothy Snyder	Bloodlands: Europe Between Hitler and Stalin		Finalists	
2012	(France) Philippe Cassard	Franz Schubert		Nominee	
2012	(France) Patrick Deville	Kampuchéa		Nominee	
2012	(South Africa) Mark Gevisser	Thabo Mbeki: The Dream Deferred		Nominee	
2012	(United States) Donald Ray Pollock	The Devil All the Time		Nominee	
2012	(Russia) Maria Rybakova	Острый нож для мягкого сердца	Couteau tranchant pour un cœur tendre	Nominee	
2012	(France) Bruno Smolarz	Hokusaï aux doigts d’encre		Nominee	
2013	(Iran) Mahmoud Dowlatabadi	زوال کلنل	The Colonel	Winner	
2013	(France) Serge Gruzinski	L’aigle et le Dragon: Démesure européenne et mondialisation au XVIe siècle		Finalists	
2013	(Sweden) Steve Sem-Sandberg	De fattiga i Łódź	The Emperor of Lies	Finalists	
2013	(United Kingdom) Robert Macfarlane	The Old Ways: A Journey on Foot		Second selection	
2013	(India) Uday Prakash	दिल्ली की दीवार	The Walls of Delhi	Second selection	
2013	(Poland) Janusz Głowacki	Good night, Dżerzi		First selection	
2013	(China) Chan Koonchung	盛世：中國，2013年	The Fat Years	First selection	
2013	(India) Charu Nivedita	ஸீரோ டிகிரி	Zero Degree	First selection	
2013	(France) Tiphaine Samoyault	Bête de cirque		First selection	
2013	(Spain) Enrique Vila-Matas	Chet Baker piensa en su arte		First selection	
2013	(United States) Chris Ware	Building Stories		First selection	
2014	(Ukraine) Serhiy Zhadan	Ворошиловград	Voroshylovhrad	Winner	
2014	(South Africa) Mark Gevisser	Dispatcher: Lost and Found in Johannesburg		Finalists	
2014	(United States) Marci Shore	The Taste of Ashes: The Afterlife of Totalitarianism in Eastern Europe		Finalists	
2014	(United Kingdom) Rana Mitter	China’s War with Japan, 1937-1945: The Struggle for Survival		Second selection	
2014	(Spain) Jaume Cabré	Confiteor	Confessions	Second selection	
2014	(Canada) Maxime Raymond Bock	Atavismes	Atavisms	First selection	
2014	(France) Camille de Toledo	Oublier, trahir puis disparaître		First selection	
2014	(United States) Paul Harding	Enon		First selection	
2014	(United States) Fanny Howe	Second Childhood		First selection	
2014	(Poland) Wojciech Nowicki	Salki		First selection	
2014	(Serbia) Dragan Velikić	Bonavia		First selection	
2014	(Iraq) (Germany) Najem Wali	ملائكة الجنوب	Engel des Südens	First selection	
2015	(United Kingdom) Mark Thompson	Birth Certificate: The Story of Danilo Kiš		Winner	
2015	(Germany) (Iran) Navid Kermani	Zwischen Koran und Kafka: West-östliche Erkundungen	Between Quran and Kafka: West-Eastern Inquiries	Finalists	
2015	(Iraq) (Germany) Najem Wali	بغداد مالبورو، من أجل برادلي مانينك	Bagdad Marlboro: Ein Roman für Bradley Manning	Finalists	
2015	(France) Jean-Noël Orengo	La Fleur du Capital		Second selection	
2015	(Israel) Ari Shavit	My Promised Land: The Triumph and Tragedy of Israel		Second selection	
2015	(Germany) (Austria) Philipp Ther	Die neue Ordnung auf dem alten Kontinent: Eine Geschichte des neoliberalen Europa	Europe since 1989: A History	First selection	
2015	(Romania) Lucian Dan Teodorovici	Matei Brunul	L’histoire de Bruno Matei	First selection	
2015	(France) Frédéric Badré	La grande santé		First selection	
2015	(France) Valentin Retz	Noir parfait		First selection	
2015	(United Kingdom) Hermione Lee	Penelope Fitzgerald: A Life		First selection	
2015	(United States) Lisa Jarnot	Robert Duncan, The Ambassador from Venus: A Biography		First selection	
2015	(France) Gansel Mireille	Traduire comme transhumer	Translation as Transhumance	First selection	
2016	(Bulgaria) Georgi Gospodinov	Физика на тъгата	Physics of Sorrow	Winner	
2016	(Bosnia and Herzegovina) Dževad Karahasan	Što pepeo priča	The Solace of the Night Sky	Finalists	
2016	(United Kingdom) (United States) Aatish Taseer	The Way Things Were		Finalists	
2016	(United Kingdom) Julian Barnes	Levels of Life		Second selection	
2016	(Germany) (Iran) Navid Kermani	Ungläubiges Staunen: Über das Christentum	Wonder Beyond Belief: On Christianity	Second selection	
2016	(United States) Ada Limón	Bright Dead Things		First selection	
2016	(Canada) (Argentina) Alberto Mangel	Curiosity		First selection	
2016	(Hungary) Iván Sándor	Az éjszaka mélyén, 1914	Husar in der Hölle, 1914	First selection	
2016	(Italy) Andrea Bajani	La vita non è in ordine alfabetico		First selection	
2016	(France) (Iran) Fariba Hachtroudi	Le colonel et l’appât 455	The Man Who Snapped His Fingers	First selection	
2016	(Switzerland) Stefan Banz	Louis Michel Eilshemius: Peer of Poet-Painters		First selection	
2016	(United Kingdom) Patrick McGuinness	Poetry and Radical Politics in fin de siècle France: From Anarchism to Action française		First selection	
2016	(Spain) Víctor del Árbol	Un millón de gotas	A Million Drops	First selection	
2016	(Germany) Ulrike Guérot	Warum Europa eine Republik werden muss! Eine politische Utopie	Why Europe Should Become a Republic! A Political Utopia	First selection	
2017	(France) Thierry Wolton	Une histoire mondiale du communisme		Winner	
2017	(India) Lawrence Liang et al.	Invisible Libraries		Finalists	
2017	(China) (Germany) Liao Yiwu	輪迴的螞蟻	Die Wiedergeburt der Ameisen	Finalists	
2017	(United States) Paul Kalanithi	When Breath Becomes Air		Second selection	
2017	(Poland) Wioletta Greg	Guguły	Swallowing Mercury	Second selection	
2017	(Ukraine) Yuriy Vynnychuk	Танґо смерті	Tango of Death	First selection	
2017	(France) Eugénie Paultre	L’état actuel des choses		First selection	
2017	(Italy) (Cuba) Alvar González-Palacios	Solo ombre: Silhouettes storiche, letterarie e mondane		First selection	
2017	(United Kingdom) Peter Frankopan	The Silk Roads: A New History of the World		First selection	
2018	(Poland) Olga Tokarczuk	Księgi Jakubowe	The Books of Jacob	Winner	
2018	(Israel) Yuval Noah Harari	ההיסטוריה של המחר	Homo Deus: A Brief History of Tomorrow	Finalists	
2018	(France) Jean Rolin	Le traquet kurde		Finalists	
2018	(Germany) Norman Ohler	Der totale Rausch: Drogen im Dritten Reich	Blitzed: Drugs in the Third Reich	Second selection	
2018	(United Kingdom) Patrick McGuinness	Other People’s Countries: A Journey into Memory		Second selection	
2018	(United States) Maggie Nelson	The Argonauts		First selection	
2018	(France) Virginie Despentes	Vernon Subutex		First selection	
2018	(United Kingdom) (Hungary) George Szirtes	Bad Machine		First selection	
2018	(United Kingdom) Preti Taneja	We That Are Young		First selection	
2019	(Israel) Zeruya Shalev	כאב	Pain	Winner	
2019	(Italy) Francesca Melandri	Sangue giusto		Finalists	
2019	(Czech Republic) (France) Patrik Ouředník	La fin du monde n’aurait pas eu lieu	The End of the World Might Not Have Taken Place	Finalists	
2019	(Spain) Antonio Iturbe	La bibliotecaria de Auschwitz	The Librarian of Auschwitz	Second selection	
2019	(France) Morgan Sportès	Le ciel ne parle pas		First selection	
2019	(Norway) (Malaysia) Long Litt Woon	Stien tilbake til livet: Om sopp og sorg	The Way Through the Woods: Of Mushrooms and Mourning	First selection	
2020	(Mozambique) Mia Couto with David Brookshaw (trans.)	As Areias do Imperador	Sands of the Emperor	Winner	
2020	(United States) Fran Ross	Oreo		Finalists	
2020	(United Kingdom) (France) Philippe Sands	East West Street: On the Origins of Genocide and Crimes Against Humanity		Finalists	
2020	(France) Érik Orsenna	Briser en nous la mer gelée		Second selection	
2020	(Belgium) Bernard Quiriny	Vies conjugales		Second selection	
2020	(Germany) Roland Schimmelpfennig	An einem klaren, eiskalten Januarmorgen zu Beginn des 21. Jahrhunderts	One Clear, Ice-Cold January Morning at the Beginning of the Twenty-First Century	First selection	
2020	(Norway) Vigdis Hjorth	Arv og miljø	Will and Testament	First selection	
2020	(Poland) Wojciech Nowicki	Cieśniny		First selection	
2020	(France) Nastassja Martin	Croire aux fauves	In the Eye of the Wild	First selection	
2020	(Ukraine) Yurii Andrukhovych	Коханці юстиції	Die Lieblinge der Justiz	First selection	
2020	(Portugal) António Damásio	The Strange Order of Things: Life, Feeling, and the Making of Cultures		First selection	
2020	(France) Catherine Meurisse	La Légèreté	Lightness	First selection	
2020	(Russia) Sergei Lebedev	Предел забвения	Oblivion	First selection	
2020	(France) Sorj Chalandon	Le jour d’avant		First selection	
2020	(United States) (Vietnam) Viet Thanh Nguyen	The Sympathizer		First selection	
2020	(France) Ruth Zylberman	209 rue Saint-Maur, Paris X^{e}: Autobiographie d’un immeuble	The Department of Missing Persons	First selection	
2021	(Russia) Memorial International (Alena Kozlova, Nikolai Mikhailov, Irina Ostrovskaya, and Irina Scherbakova) with Georgia Thomson (trans.)	Знак не сотрется: Судьбы остарбайтеров в письмах, воспоминаниях и устных рассказах	OST: Letters, Memoirs and Stories from Ostarbeiter in Nazi Germany	Winner	
2021	(United States) Frank Huyler	White Hot Light: Twenty-five Years in Emergency Medicine		Finalists	
2021	(Guatemala) Eduardo Halfon with Lisa Dillman and Daniel Hahn (trans.)	Duelo	Mourning	Finalists	
2021	(United Kingdom) Sophy Roberts	The Lost Pianos of Siberia		Second selection	
2021	(Russia) Sergei Lebedev with Antonina W. Bouis (trans.)	Дебютант	Untraceable	Second selection	
2021	(United States) Daniel Mendelsohn	Three Rings: A Tale of Exile, Narrative, and Fate		First selection	
2021	(Portugal) Mário Cláudio	Tríptico da Salvação		First selection	
2021	(Russia) Ksenia Buksha	Открывается внутрь		First selection	
2021	(Russia) Maria Stepanova	Памяти памяти	In Memory of Memory	First selection	
2021	(Germany) Judith Schalansky	Verzeichnis einiger Verluste	An Inventory of Losses	First selection	
2021	(France) Édouard Louis	Qui a tué mon père	Who Killed My Father	First selection	
2021	(France) Mathieu Sapin	Gérard: Cinq années dans les pattes de Depardieu	Gérard: Five Years with Depardieu	First selection	
2021	(France) Lisa Mandel	Une année exemplaire		First selection	
2021	(France) Patrice Jean	L’homme surnuméraire		First selection	
2021	(France) Claude Hunzinger	Les grands cerfs		First selection	
2021	(Mexico) Carmen Boullosa	El libro de Ana	The Book of Anna	First selection	
2022	(Finland) (France) Taina Tervonen	Les fossoyeuses		Winner	
2022	(Brazil) Eliane Brum with Diane Grosklaus Whitty (trans.)	A vida que ninguém vê	The Collector of Leftover Souls: Dispatches from Brazil	Finalists	
2022	(Afghanistan) (United Kingdom) Untold Narratives	—	My Pen is the Wing of a Bird: New Fiction by Afghan Women	Finalists	
2022	(France) Perrine Lamy-Quique	Dans leur nuit		Second selection	
2022	(France) Laurent Binet	Civilizations		Second selection	
2022	(Mauritius) (France) Nathacha Appanah	Le ciel par-dessus le toit	The Sky Above the Roof	First selection	
2022	(United Kingdom) M. John Harrison	The Sunken Land Begins to Rise Again		First selection	
2022	(Bulgaria) Georgi Gospodinov	Времеубежище	Time Shelter	First selection	
2022	(United Kingdom) Cat Jarman	River Kings: A New History of the Vikings from Scandinavia to the Silk Roads		First selection	
2022	(France) Tanguy Viel	La fille qu’on appelle	The Girl You Call	First selection	
2022	(France) Stéphanie Coste	Le passeur		First selection	
2023	(Venezuela) (Spain) Karina Sainz Borgo	El Tercer País		Winner	
2023	(Canada) Suzanne Simard	Finding the Mother Tree: Uncovering the Wisdom and Intelligence of the Forest		Finalists	
2023	(Uzbekistan) (United Kingdom) Hamid Ismailov with Donald Rayfield (trans.)	Manaschi		Finalists	
2023	(Italy) Emanuele Trevi	Due vite		Second selection	
2023	(Belgium) Stefan Hertmans with David McKay (trans.)	De opgang	The Ascent	Second selection	
2023	(France) Hélène Frappat	Trois femmes disparaissent		First selection	
2023	(France) Michel Houellebecq	Anéantir	Annihilation	First selection	
2023	(Spain) Eva Baltasar	Boulder		First selection	
2023	(United States) (Russia) Anna Badkhen	Bright Unbearable Reality		First selection	
2023	(Spain) Agustín Fernández Mallo	El libro de todos los amores	The Book of All Loves	First selection	
2023	(Sweden) Sara Stridsberg	Kärlekens Antarktis	The Antarctica of Love	First selection	
2023	(Norway) Aslak Nore	Havets kirkegård	The Sea Cemetery	First selection	
2023	(Republic of Ireland) Sally Hayden	My Fourth Time, We Drowned: Seeking Refuge on the World’s Deadliest Migration Route		First selection	
2023	(United States) Sigrid Nunez	What Are You Going Through?		First selection	
2024	(Canada) Kate Beaton	Ducks: Two Years in the Oil Sands		Winner	
2024	(France) Mathieu Belazi	Attaquer la terre et le soleil		Finalists	
2024	(Spain) Irene Solà	Canto jo i la muntanya balla	When I Sing, Mountains Dance	Finalists	
2024	(Egypt) Iman Mersal	في أثر عنايات الزيات	Traces of Enayat	Second selection	
2024	(Switzerland) Fabienne Radi	Une autobiographie de Nina Childress		Second selection	
2024	(Costa Rica) Carlos Fonseca	Austral		First selection	
2024	(France) Sylvain Tesson	Avec les fées		First selection	
2024	(South Korea) (Germany) Byung-Chul Han	Infokratie: Digitalisierung und die Krise der Demokratie	Infocracy: Digitization and the Crisis of Democracy	First selection	
2024	(France) Yasmina Reza	James Brown mettait des bigoudis		First selection	
2024	(France) (United Kingdom) Cecile Pin	Wandering Souls		First selection	
2024	(United States) (United Kingdom) Hisham Matar	My Friends		First selection	
2024	(Mexico) Fernanda Melchor	Páradais	Paradais	First selection	
2024	(France) Gaëlle Obiégly	Sans valeur		First selection	
2024	(United Kingdom) Adam Thirlwell	The Future Future		First selection	
2025	(Mexico) Guadalupe Nettel	La hija única	Still Born	Winner	
2025	(France) Pierre Bayard	Et si les Beatles n’étaient pas nés ?		Finalists	
2025	(United States) Lydia Davis	Our Strangers: Stories		Finalists	
2025	(Denmark) Solvej Balle	Om udregning af rumfang I	On the Calculation of Volume I	Second selection	
2025	(United States) Cat Bohannon	Eve: How the Female Body Drove 200 Million of years of Human Evolution		Second selection	
2025	(France) Maylis Adhémar	La grande ourse		First selection	
2025	(United Kingdom) Claire-Louise Bennett	Checkout 19		First selection	
2025	(United States) Percival Everett	James		First selection	
2025	(France) Jérôme Garcin	Mes fragiles		First selection	
2025	(Germany) Michael S. Honegger	The Need to Know		First selection	
2025	(France) Etienne Kern	Les envolés		First selection	
2025	(France) Basile Panurgias	Le doute		First selection	
2025	(France) (Morocco) Leïla Slimani	J’emporterai le feu		First selection	
2025	(France) Vincent Zonca	Lichens: Toward a Minimal Resistance		First selection	
