= Huyler =

Huyler is a surname. Notable people with the surname include:

- Frank Huyler (born 1964), American emergency physician, poet and author
- John Huyler (1808–1870), American politician
- Stafford Huyler, author of the webcomic NetBoy

== See also ==
- Hayler
