= Tiphaine Samoyault =

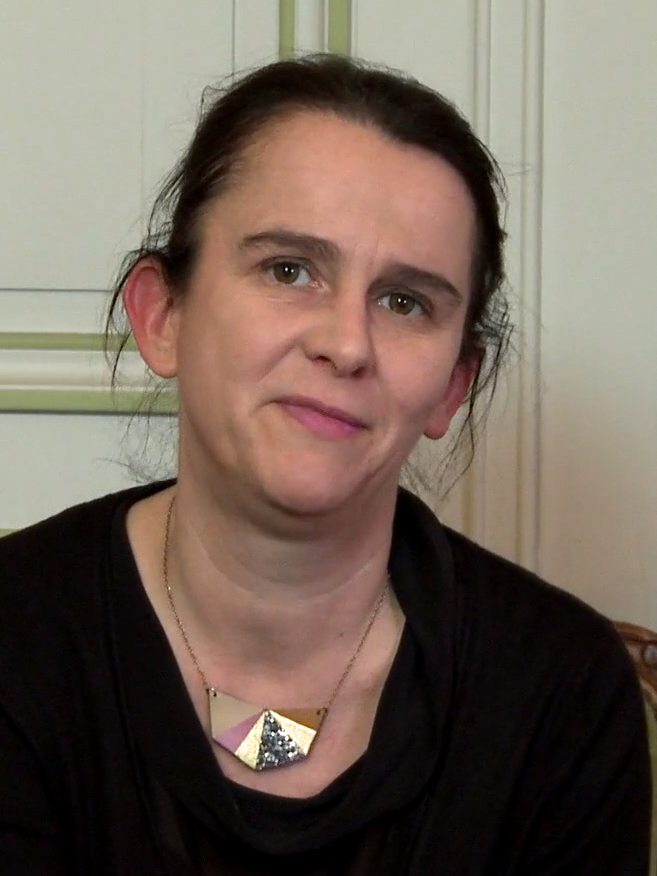
Tiphaine Samoyault (2015)

Tiphaine Samoyault (June 1968, Boulogne-Billancourt) is a French university lecturer, literary critic, and novelist, specializing in the work of Roland Barthes. She is the niece of harpsichordist Blandine Verlet and writer, academic and psychoanalyst Agnès Verlet. In 2015, she received the Grand Prize in Non-Fiction from the Société des gens de lettres.

== Early life and education ==
Tiphaine Samoyault was born in Boulogne-Billancourt in June 1968. She grew up in Fontainebleau, in the Château de Fontainebleau, where her father, Jean-Pierre Samoyault, was curator. This childhood is evoked in her first novel, La Cour des Adieux, named after the cour d'Honneur of the palace, where Napoleon said his farewells.

Her childhood was immersed in music, notably at the American Conservatory in Fontainebleau, directed at the time by Nadia Boulanger, and located near her parents' apartments in the château. A graduate of the Ecole Normale Supérieure, Samoyault wrote her doctoral thesis on Romans-Mondes, les formes de la totalisation romanesque au vingtième siècle (1996) and her habilitation thesis on l'Actualité de la fiction : théorie, comparaison, traduction (2003).

== Career ==
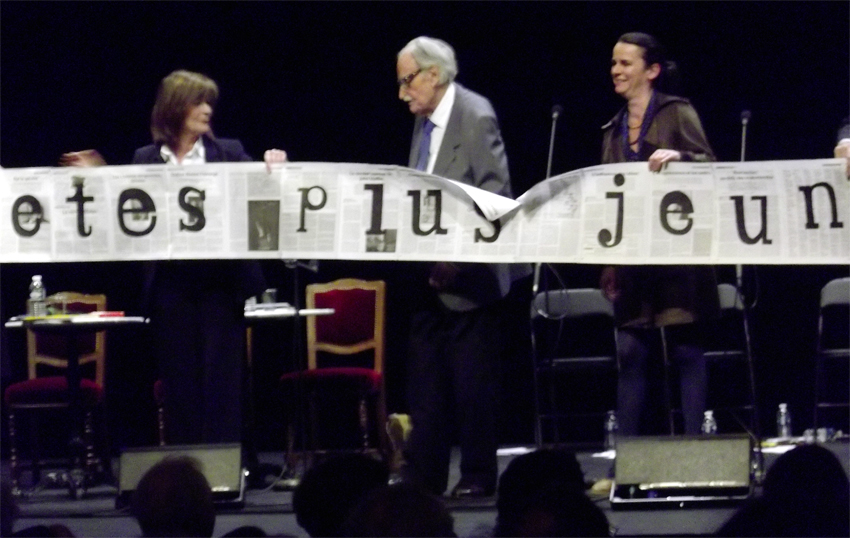
Claire Nadeau, Maurice Nadeau, and Tiphaine Samoyault (l-r) (2011)

After working at the Université Paris-VIII, she became Professor of Comparative Literature at the Université Sorbonne Nouvelle - Paris 3. Until June 2012, she headed the comparative literature department at Université Paris-VIII. A former resident of the Villa Médicis (2000–2001), Samoyault is also a novelist and translator of, among other works, portions of the new edition of James Joyce's Ulysses, and of David Shulman and Charles Malamoud's essay Ta'ayushn : journal d'un combat pour la paix : Israël Palestine, 2002-2005 (Le Seuil, 2006).

A member of the reading committee at Editions du Seuil, she also contributes to France Culture and was a contributor to La Quinzaine littéraire until September 2015.

She is a member of the editorial board of the online journal En attendant Nadeau. Since 2022, Samoyault has been writing a serial for Le Monde Livres.

== Awards and honours ==
- Grand prize in non-fiction, Société des gens de lettres (2015)
- Longlisted, Jan Michalski Prize (2015)

== Selected works ==
=== Essays ===
- Excès du roman : essai, Paris, Maurice Nadeau, 1999 ISBN 2862311529, 9782862311524
- Littérature et mémoire du présent, Nantes, Pleins feux, 2001 (fascicule) ISBN 2912567815, 9782912567819
- L'intertextualité : mémoire de la littérature, Paris, Nathan, 2001 ISBN 2091911259, 9782091911250 ; rééd. A. Colin, Paris, 2005
- La montre cassée : forme et signification d'un motif dans les arts du temps, Verdier, Lagrasse, 2004 ISBN 2864324148, 9782864324140
- Traduction et violence, Seuil, 2020 ISBN 202145178X, 9782021451788

=== Children's documentary ===
- Le monde des pictogrammes, Paris, Circonflexe, 1995 ISBN 978-2878336986 - English edition: Alphabetical order : how the alphabet began, New York, Penguin / Viking, 1996 ISBN 978-0670878086

=== Biographies ===
- Roland Barthes, Paris, Le Seuil, 2015 ISBN 978-2-02-101020-6

=== Introductions or commentaries to major works of French literature ===
- Électre de Jean Giraudoux (1997)
- W ou le souvenir d'enfance de Georges Perec (1997)
- Impressions d'Afrique de Raymond Roussel (2005)
- Locus solus de Raymond Roussel (2005)
- Le Grand Meaulnes d'Alain-Fournier (2009)

=== Novels and short stories ===
- La Cour des adieux, Maurice Nadeau, Paris, 1999 ISBN 2862311537, 9782862311531
- Météorologie du rêve, Le Seuil, Paris, 2000 ISBN 2020395746, 9782020395748
- Les Indulgences, Le Seuil, Paris, 2003 ISBN 2020556286, 9782020556286
- La Main négative, Editions Argol, Paris, 2008 ISBN 9782915978353, 2915978352
- Bête de cirque, Le Seuil, Paris, 2013 ISBN 2-02-109826-5, 978-2-02-109826-6
