= Charu Nivedita =

Tamil-language writer

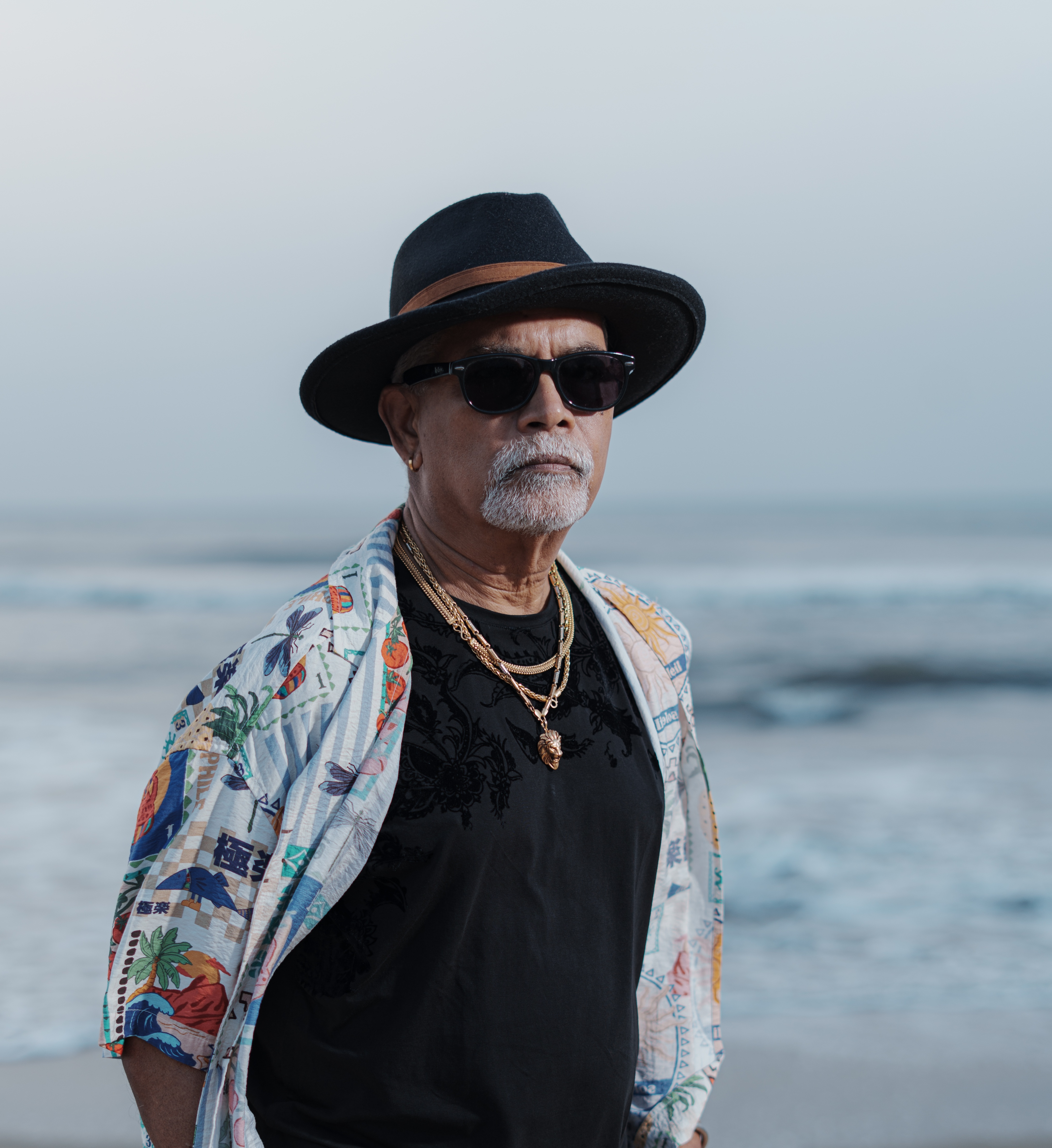
- Born: K. Arivazhagan; 18 December 1953 (age 72); Idumbavanam, Thiruvarur (then: Thanjavur), Tamil Nadu, India
- Occupations: Writer, Novelist
- Spouse: Avanthika
- Writing career
- Pen name: Charu Nivedita
- Genres: Autofiction, Transgressive Fiction, Metafiction, Postmodernism
- Notable works: Zero Degree, Marginal Man, Morgue Keeper
- Website: charunivedita.com// charuonline.com/blog/

Charu Nivedita aka Charu (born 18 December 1953) is a Tamil writer based in Chennai, India.

His novel Zero Degree (1998) was translated into English in 2013 and longlisted that year for the annual Jan Michalski Prize for Literature. It was also selected or the prestigious 50 Writers, 50 Books - The Best of Indian Fiction, published in 2013 by HarperCollins.

Charu uses postmodern themes in his writing. He was selected as one among 'Top Ten Indians of the Decade 2001 - 2010' by The Economic Times. He is inspired by Marquis de Sade and Andal.

In addition, he has written essays published in such magazines as Art Review Asia, The Asian Age and Deccan Chronicle.

His most recent novel, Conversations With Aurangzeb, was released in October 2023. It is part satire and part historical fiction, exploring the enigmatic persona of the controversial 17th-century Mughal Emperor Aurangzeb. This Novel won the Crossword Award in 2024.

== Bibliography ==
=== Works available in English ===
1. Zero Degree (Novel)
2. Marginal Man (Novel)
3. To Byzantium: A Turkey Travelogue
4. Unfaithfully Yours (Collection of articles)
5. Morgue Keeper (Selected short stories)
6. Towards a Third Cinema (Articles on Latin American Cinema)
7. Conversations With Aurangzeb

=== Novels ===
1. Existentialism and Fancy Baniyan - Tamil / Malayalam
2. Zero Degree - Tamil / English / Malayalam
3. Rasa Leela
4. Kaamarooba Kathaigal
5. Thegam
6. Marginal Man (Tamil title was named 'Puthiya Exile') - Tamil / English
7. Conversations With Aurangzeb (Tamil title was Naanthaan Aurangzeb)
8. Anbu: Oru Pinnaveenathuvavaathiyin Maruseeraivu Manu
9. Pettiyo
10. Jodippuraavai Enge Kaanom?

=== Short stories ===
1. Carnataka Murasum Naveena Tamil Ilakiyathin Meethana Oru Amaipiyal Aayvum - Collection of short stories, published along with Nagaarchunan and Sylvia, aka M.D. Muthukumarasamy
2. Nano
3. Madumitha Sonna Pambu Kathaigal
4. Shakespeare-in Minnanjal Mugavari (Shakespeare's e-mail address)
5. Kadal Kanni - Short stories translated from world literature
6. Oorin miga azhagaana Pen – Translated short stories from world Literature
7. Muthukkal Pathu - Selected short stories
8. Morgue Keeper - Selected short stories in English in Kindle
9. "Diabolically Yours", in Exotic Gothic, Volume 5
10. Inspector Shenbagaramanum Thiruvallikkeni Tasmackum
11. Maayaman Vettai
12. Nagore Dhamrootum Aattayaampatti Murukkum

=== Collection of articles ===
1. Konal Pakkangal - Part 1
2. Konal Pakkankal - Part 2
3. Konal Pakkangal - Part 3
4. Dhisai Ariyum Paravaigal
5. Moodupani Saalai
6. Varambu Meeriya Pradhigal
7. Thappu Thalangal
8. Kalagam Kaadhal Isai
9. Dante-yin Siruththai
10. Yenakku Kuzhandhaigalai Pidikadhu
11. Kadavulum Nanum
12. Kalaiyum Kaamamum
13. Kadavulum Saithaanum
14. Sarasam Sallabam Saamiyar
15. Vaazhvadhu eppadi
16. Ketta vaarththai
17. Malawi endroru Desam
18. Azaadhi Azaadhi Azaadhi
19. Adhigaaram Amaidhi Sudhanthiram
20. Kanavugalin mozhipeyarppaalan
21. Manamkoththi paravai
22. Enge Un Kadavul?
23. Kadaisip Pakkangal
24. Vetrulagavaasiyin Diarykkuripugal
25. Pazhuppu Nirap Pakkangal - Part 1
26. Pazhuppu Nirap Pakkangal - Part 2
27. Pazhuppu Nirap Pakkangal - Part 3
28. Nadodiyin Natkuripugal
29. Medusavin Mathukoppai
30. Kanavu Cappucino Konjam Chatting - 1
31. Kanavu Cappucino Konjam Chatting - 2
32. Kanavugalin Mozhipayarpalan
33. To Byzantium - A Turkey Travelogue (Tamil title was named 'Nilavu Theyatha Thesam) - Tamil/English
34. Unfaithfully Yours - Collection of articles
35. Mazhaiya Peigirathu
36. Varam
37. Akaalam
38. Poochi - Part 1
39. Poochi - Part 2
40. Voltairai Eppadi Naam Kaidhu Seyya Mudiyum
41. Inji Sukku Kadukkai
42. Mayan Maaligai
43. Culture Vulture Arasiyal Katturaigal

=== Play ===
1. Rendaam Aattam
2. Antonin Artaud - Oru Kilarchikkaranin Udal

=== Poetry ===
1. Smashan Thara
2. Sorgam Naragam Matrum Oru Golf Maidhanam

=== Cinema review ===
1. Latin American Cinema
2. Cinema: Alainthuthiribavanin Azhagiyal
3. Theeraakaadhali
4. Cinema Cinema
5. Naragaththilirundhu oru kural
6. Kanavugalin Nadanam
7. Towards a Third Cinema
8. Oliyin Perunchalanam
9. Kodambakkam

=== Collection of interviews ===
1. Ozhunginmaiyin Veriyaattam
2. Ichchaigalin Irulveli (Second edition of the erstwhile Paaliyal - Oru Urayaadal that comes with the new title)
3. Anniyanudan Or Uraiyaadal

=== Question and Answers ===
1. Arugil Varaadhey
2. Aram Porul Inbam

== Awards and accolades ==
- Zero Degree was selected for the 50 Writers, 50 Books - The Best of Indian Fiction, edited by Chandra Siddan and Pradeep Sebastian, published by HarperCollins.
- He was selected as among 'Top Ten Indians of the Decade 2001 - 2010' by The Economic Times.
- Zero Degree (in English) was long-listed for the 2013 edition of Jan Michalski Prize.
- Zero Degree was selected in 2013 as one of "fifteen lesser known yet incredible Indian novels" by Mensxp.com.
- The Hindu included Nivedita in its list of "Manathil Pathintha Mugangal 25" (Twenty-Five Eminent Personalities of Tamil Nadu) in its Diwali Malar 2014.
- He received the Kannadasan Award in 2019.
- Naanthaan Aurangzeb was selected as the best novel of the year 2021 by Vasagasalai.
- He received the 2022 Vishnupuram award, a literary award instituted by Vishnupuram Ilakkiya Vattam.
- Conversations With Aurangzeb won the Crossword Award in 2024.

== Literary contemporaries on Charu Nivedita ==
- Vahni Capildeo places Charu Nivedita on par with Vladimir Nabokov, James Joyce and Jean Genet, in her article in the Caribbean Review of Books.
- In his foreword to the Malayalam translation of Zero Degree, Paul Zacharia wrote, "It is like an open experimental laboratory. Amidst the smoke, noxious vapors, and beautiful imagery, I experienced a wondrous journey."
- Tarun Tejpal wrote that Zero Degree is remarkable for its experimental voice and its varying and shifting tonalities.
- Anil Menon considers Zero Degree bold and ambitious.
- Translator Jason Grunebaum considers Zero Degree "wildly exciting".

== Public events ==
=== Literary festivals ===
- Charu Nivedita was one of the invitees for the 2010 and 2011 editions of Almost Island Dialogues, New Delhi.
- He was one of the invitees for the Hay Festival 2010, Thiruvananthapuram.
- Hay Festival 2011, Thiruvananthapuram was inaugurated at the British Deputy High Commission, Chennai by Mike Nithavrianakis, the then Deputy High Commissioner, followed by a reading of an excerpt from Charu Nivedita's works.
- He was one of the invitees for the 2012 edition of Jaipur Literary Festival.
- He was felicitated at the Twenty Sixth Anniversary Celebration of Katha, a monthly literary magazine of Sambad (an Odia daily) at Bhubaneswar on 10 February 2013.
- He was one of the invitees for the Brahmaputra Literary Festival 2017.
- He was one of the panelists in Kerala Literature Festival 2017.
- He was one of the speakers the Manipal International Literature and Arts Platform 2018

=== Film festivals ===
- Charu Nivedita was invited as the Guest of Honour on 10 March 2002 at the National Folklore Support Centre Folk Festival, Chennai.
- He inaugurated the Third SIO Samvedana Vedhi International Film Festival, 2010, organised by the Students Islamic Organisation of India wing of the University of Calicut.
- He inaugurated the International Film Festival of Tamil Nadu 2010, Chennai, organised by the International Tamil Film Academy and Seventh Channel Communications.
- He inaugurated the Fourth Panchajanyam International Film Festival 2011 at Chittur, Kerala.
- He inaugurated the valedictory session of the Third International Film Festival 2011, Kochi, which was jointly organised by the Kerala State Chalachitra Academy, Heart Light Association and the Ernakulam District Information Office.
- At the 2013 Chennai Rainbow Film Festival (LGBT Film Festival), presented by Alliance Française de Madras, he participated in the 'Panel Discussion on Media Portrayal of LGBT issues.'

=== Lectures and meets ===
- Charu Nivedita delivered the 2009 Paul Chirakkarode Memorial Lecture at Kottayam.
- He was invited to speak at the valedictory function of ‘Thattakaperuma,' a series of programmes to observe the second death anniversary of Kovilan, Malayalam writer at Thrissur on 3 June 2012.
- He delivered the commemoration speech at the 'Bob Marley Cultural Fest' on 11 May 2010 at Kochi.
- He was one of the panelists at the Outlook Speak Out debate 2010, Chennai on the subject 'Moral Policing in a Democracy'.

=== Social activism ===
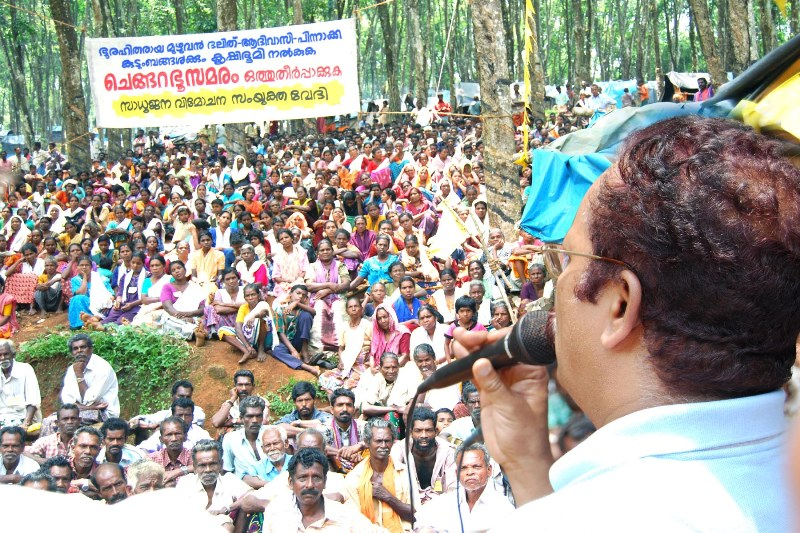
Charu Nivedita at Velichikala - Anti-clay mining protest, May 12, 2008

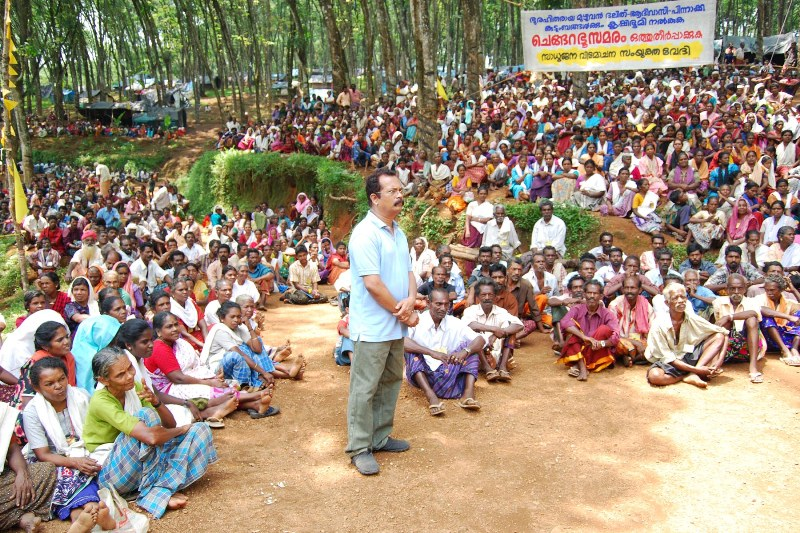
Charu Nivedita at Velichikala

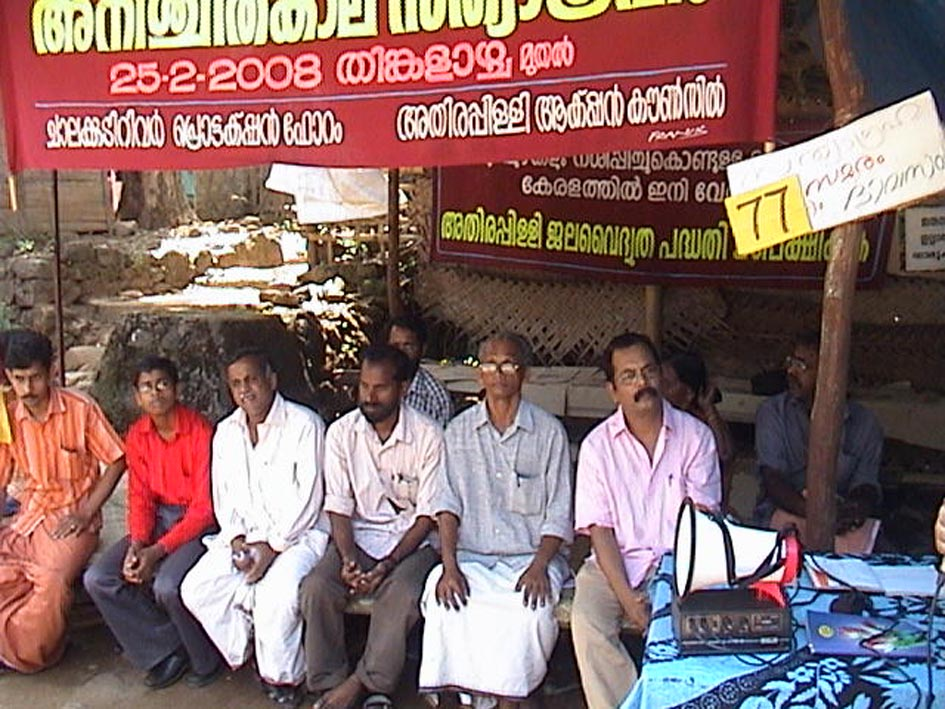
Charu Nivedita at Plachimada Anti-Coca-Cola Relay Hunger Strike, 77th day, May 13, 2008
- He was invited as the chief guest of Sambavas' annual celebrations (a Dalit caste) at Chalakudy in Kerala on 11 May 2008.
- He inaugurated a meeting and spoke among the adivasis protesting against wanton clay mining at Velichikala, near Kollam.
- He addressed a gathering of Plachimada villagers who were on a relay hunger strike against Coca-Cola's wanton over-drawing of groundwater and polluting water bodies.
- He marched with villagers protesting against Coca-Cola and Pepsi's wanton overdrawing of groundwater at Kanjikode, near Palakkad on 29 August 2008.
- He inaugurated a symposium on Mullaiperiyar Dam issue organized by 'Uyiru', a joint cultural forum of Tamil and Malayalam writers and social activists on 7 July 2012 at Kottayam.

== 'Zero Degree' in Academics ==
- Zero Degree was on the curriculum in Spring 2010 in a Comparative World Literature course, taught by Jordan Smith, at California State University, Long Beach (CSULB).
- University of Rochester has included Zero Degree in its translation program.
- The Malayalam translation of Zero Degree is in the curriculum for postgraduate students at the Mahatma Gandhi University, Kottayam.
- An IIT Guwahati research article terms Zero Degree a metamodern novel.

== Quotations ==
- "I convert my schizoid (state) into an art."
- "There is nothing like planning in my literature, at any point of time. It's something which gets written between the schizoid state and dreams. Hence, with this same reason, I cannot comment on my writing. Like how I don't accept the roles of a father, a son, a lover, a friend – I despise the role of a writer too. My writing is nothing but the brush strokes of a person trying to escape from hell."
- "Hatred is a disease."

== See also ==
- List of Indian writers
