= Mark Thompson (historian) =

British historian (born 1959)

Mark Thompson (born 1959) is a British historian of Yugoslavia. The most recent of his four books is Birth Certificate: The Story of Danilo Kiš (2013), which tells the story of the titular Yugoslav novelist and translator and was described by Adam Thirlwell, in a lead review in the Times Literary Supplement, as "a great biography of the work as much as the life". The book won the Jan Michalski Prize for Literature in Switzerland in 2015.

The White War. Life and Death on the Italian Front, 1915-1919 (2008) is the first comprehensive narrative history in English of the part played by Italy in World War I. It was selected as Book of the Week by The Guardian newspaper, and hailed there as "magnificent ... original, masterly and definitive."

Forging War (1999) is an account of the media manipulation that took place before and during the Wars of Yugoslav Succession.

A Paper House (1992) is a political travelogue which describes the federal republic of Yugoslavia upon the brink of dissolution.

Thompson has also edited, with Louis Mackay, Something in the Wind: Politics after Chernobyl (1988), and has translated fiction from French, Italian and Croatian.

His CV includes stints as the head of media analysis for the biggest peacekeeping mission mounted by the United Nations (UNPROFOR), in 1994 and 1995; the first political officer to serve with the UN's smallest peacekeeping mission (UNMOP) in 1997; the spokesman and head of media affairs for the mission to Croatia of the Organization for Security and Co-operation in Europe (OSCE) in 1998 and 1999; and the Balkans Program Director of the International Crisis Group (ICG) in 2000 and 2001.

In 2015, Thompson took up a position as Reader in Modern History at the University of East Anglia (half time). He lives in Oxford, where he supervises a small number of undergraduate and graduate students at the Faculty of History. Thompson is an alumnus of Merchant Taylors' School, Northwood.

== Awards and honours ==
- 2009 Hessell-Tiltman Prize winner for The White War
- 2009 Orwell Prize shortlist for The White War
- 2013 National Book Critics Circle Award (Biography) shortlist for Birth Certificate
- 2015 Jan Michalski Prize for Literature winner for Birth Certificate: The Story of Danilo Kiš
