= Peter Fröberg Idling =

Swedish writer and a literary critic (born 1972)

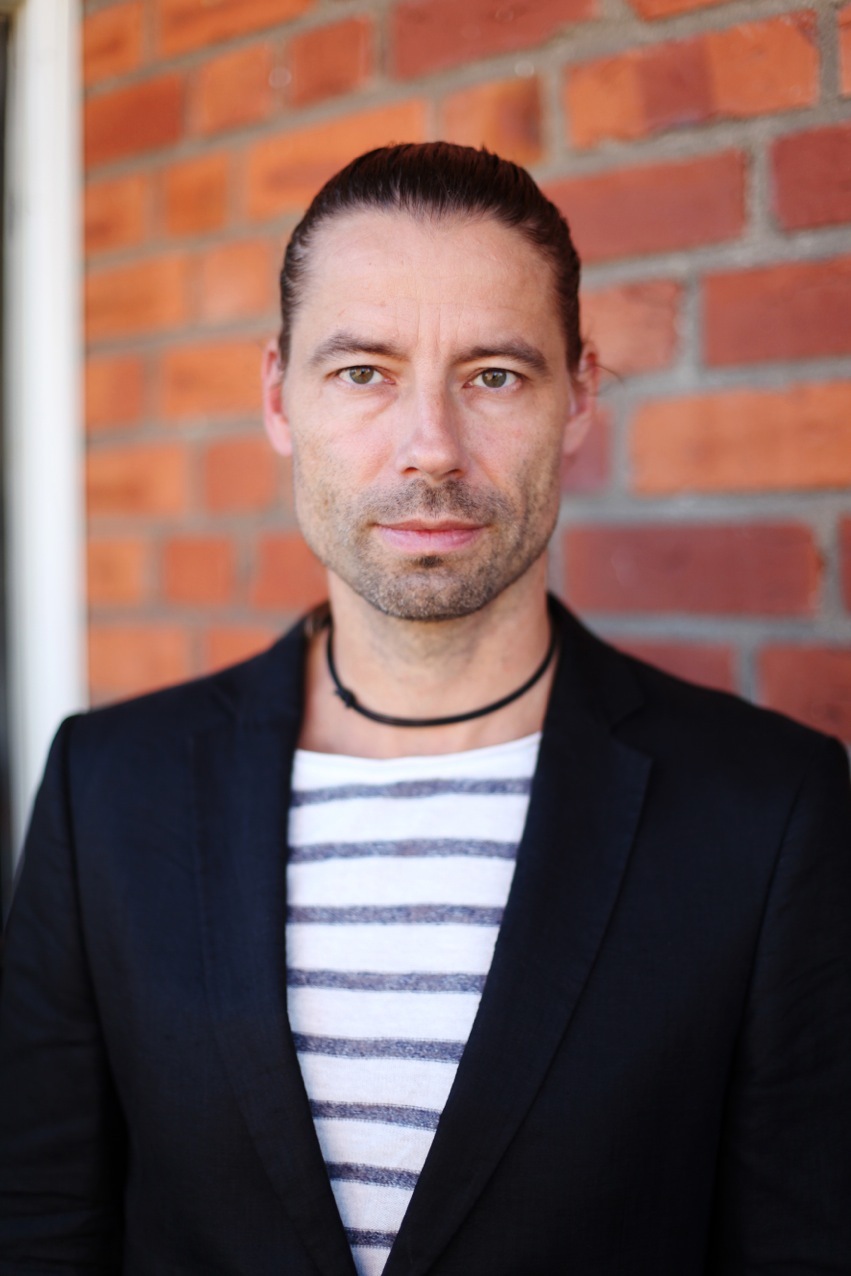
Peter Fröberg Idling

Peter Fröberg Idling (born 1972, in Stockholm) is a Swedish writer and a literary critic. He graduated from law school and spent two years in Cambodia working as a legal advisor to a human rights organisation. His first book of literary nonfiction, Pol Pots leende (Pol Pot's Smile), was translated into seven languages and shortlisted for several literary awards. In 2015 it was adapted for the stage and premiered in Berlin.

In 2012, Idling published his debut novel, Song for an Approaching Storm, to critical acclaim. The book was nominated for the August Prize, the Dublin Literary Award and is being translated into seven languages.

His third book, the novel Julia & Paul, was published in 2017. It was followed a year later by 17 April 1975. A Cambodian Journey, written together with the Italian photographer Giovanna Silva.

His fourth book, the horror novel "Nidamörkur" was published in 2020.

== Bibliography ==
- Pol Pots leende (Non fiction, 2006)
  - De glimlach van Pol Pot (Netherlands, 2009)
  - Pol Pots smil (Denmark, 2009)
  - Pol Pots smil (Norway, 2010)
  - Il sorriso di Pol Pot (Italy, 2010)
  - Uśmiech Pol Pota (Poland, 2010)
  - Pol Pots Lächeln (Germany, 2013)
  - Улыбка Пол Пота (Russia, 2014)
  - Pol Potov úsmev (Slovakia, 2017)
- Sång till den storm som ska komma (Novel, 2012)
  - De fatale driehoek (Netherlands, 2013)
  - Laulu nousevalle myrskylle (Finland, 2013)
  - Sang til den storm som skal komme (Norway, 2014)
  - Song for an approaching storm (United Kingdom, 2014)
  - Canto della tempesta che verrà (Italy, 2014)
  - Sang til den storm, der skal komme (Denmark, 2014)
  - Gesang für einen aufziehenden Sturm (Germany, 2015)
- Julia & Paul (Novel, 2017)
- 17 April 1975. A Cambodian Journey (Photo essay, with Giovanna Silva, 2018)
- Nidamörkur (Novel, 2020)

== Awards and honours ==
2007 Dagens Nyheters kulturpris, shortlist, Pol Pot's Smile

2010 Ryszard Kapuściński Award for literary reportage, shortlist, Pol Pot's Smile

2011 Jan Michalski Prize for Literature, shortlist, Pol Pot's Smile

2012 Johan Hansson Award, "Song for an approaching storm"

2012 August Prize, shortlist, Song for an approaching storm

2015 International Dublin Literary Award, longlist, "Song for an approaching storm"
