= Zero Degree =

1998 novel by Charu Nivedita

Zero Degree is a 1998 postmodern, transgressive, lipogrammatic novel by Tamil author Charu Nivedita, who is based in India. It was later translated into Malayalam and English.

Known for its experimental structure and non-linear narrative style, the novel is regarded as a significant work in contemporary Tamil literature. It explores themes of identity, desire, violence, and psychological instability through a fragmented and multi-voiced narrative. An English translation by Pritham K. Chakravarthy and Rakesh Khanna was published by Blaft Publications in 2008.

== Synopsis ==
Zero Degree traces the experiences of a disturbed narrator whose world unfolds through a fragmented, dream-like sequence of events. The story does not follow a linear path; instead, it mirrors the protagonist’s fractured state of mind. Through its shifting voices and disjointed episodes, the novel reflects on questions of identity, desire, and existential despair.

== Style ==
Zero Degree is noted for its unconventional literary techniques. These include abrupt transitions between voices, the absence of a straightforward chronology, and the use of multiple narrative forms such as lists, transcripts, prose-poetry, and archival-style fragments. Some chapters employ minimal or non-traditional punctuation, while others reference global literature, cinema, and Tamil mythology.

The novel incorporates a lipogrammatic constraint in which only numbers numerologically equivalent to nine appear (with limited exceptions). Characters from Charu Nivedita’s earlier works also appear, creating an interlinked fictional universe.

== Themes ==
The book addresses a wide range of subjects, including:

- Fragmented identity and self-perception,
- Sexuality and bodily experience,
- Violence and trauma,
- Myth, symbolism, and cultural memory.

Its treatment of these themes has led to its classification within transgressive fiction and, in some academic discussions, metamodern literary practices.

== Reception ==
The novel has received attention for its formal experimentation and challenge to conventional Tamil narrative structures. It has attracted both critical praise for its innovation and scrutiny for its explicit treatment of sexuality and violence.

Zero Degree has been longlisted for the Jan Michalski Prize for Literature (2013) and was included in the anthology “50 Writers, 50 Books: The Best of Indian Fiction” published by HarperCollins in 2013. The book is studied in comparative literature and translation courses in several universities.

== Legacy ==
The novel is considered a notable example of late-20th-century Tamil experimental prose. It continues to be referenced in academic research on narrative form, intertextuality, and literary modernism in South Asian literature. The work has developed a sustained readership and is often described as having a cult following.

== Awards and accolades ==
Year	Awards and accolades	Remarks
2013	Jan Michalski Prize	Longlisted for the 2013 edition
2013	50 Writers, 50 Books - The Best of Indian Fiction	Book published by HarperCollins
2014	important novel in the Metafiction genre	Considered by The Sunday Guardian
2017	Fifteen lesser known but incredible Indian novels.	Selected in by Mensxp.com

== Literary contemporaries on Zero Degree ==
- In his foreword to the Malayalam translation of Zero Degree, Paul Zacharia wrote, "It is like an open experimental laboratory. Amidst the smoke, noxious vapors, and beautiful imagery, I experienced a wondrous journey."
- Tarun Tejpal opines that Zero Degree is remarkable for its experimental voice and its varying and shifting tonalities.
- Anil Menon considers Zero Degree bold and ambitious. He posits that the ancient fascination with language and reality continues to burst through the crust in Charu Nivedita’s works.
- Noted translator Jason Grunebaum considers Zero Degree wildly exciting and complains that Charu does not write in Hindi, so that he would translate Charu's works to English.
- Poet Vivek Narayanan says about Zero Degree: "I think we should take Zero Degree not just as a playful, ironic “postmodern” novel but as a novel of oppositions and contradictions: a deeply autobiographical novel where the self has been scattered, an ironic pastiche novel that speaks to raw experience, a defiantly cosmopolitan novel than nonetheless pins a very particular kind of schizophrenic rage that perhaps—I could be wrong—any Tamilian will immediately recognise."

== Universities on Zero Degree ==
- Zero Degree was on the curriculum in Spring 2010 in a Comparative World Literature course, taught by Jordan Smith, at California State University, Long Beach (CSULB).
- University of Rochester has included Zero Degree in its translation program.
- The Malayalam translation of Zero Degree is in the curriculum for postgraduate students at the Mahatma Gandhi University, Kottayam.

== Translations ==
- Zero Degree was translated into Malayalam in 1999 by Dr G.Balasubrahmanian and Dr P.M.Gireesh.
- It was translated into English in 2008 by Pritham K. Chakravarthy and Rakesh Khanna.
- Further translations into Telugu, Hindi and Spanish are on the anvil.

== Reviews ==
- Review of Zero Degree in Tehelka
- Review of Zero Degree by Pallavi Rao
- Review of Zero Degree in the Times of India
- Review of Zero Degree in The New Sunday Express

== Special feature ==
Keeping with the numerological theme of Zero Degree, the only numbers expressed in either words or symbols are numerologically equivalent to nine (with the exception of two chapters). This Oulipian ban includes the very common word one (only in Tamil edition).

== See also ==
- Constrained writing
