= Najem Wali =

Iraqi novelist and journalist

- نجم والي
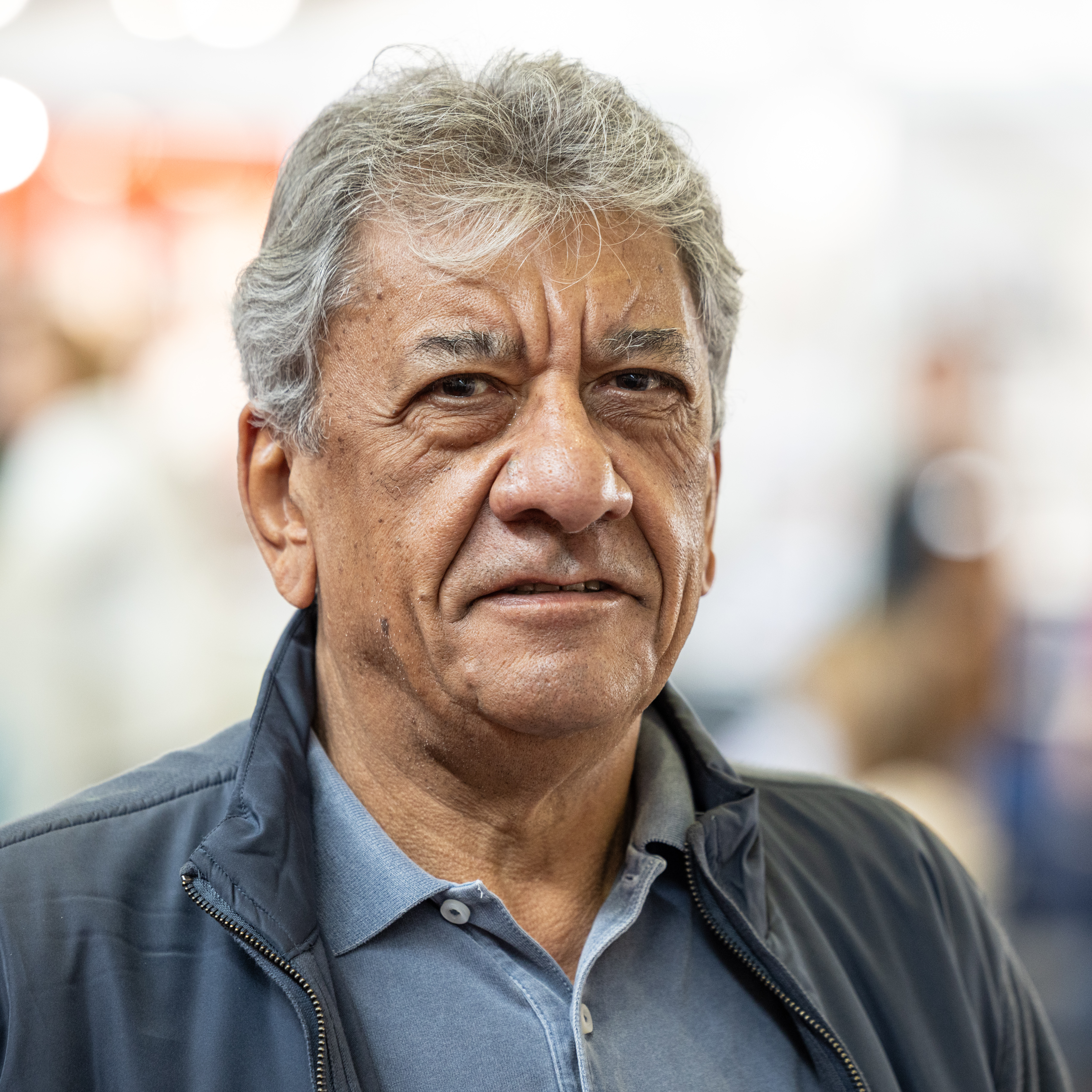
- Najem Wali at the Frankfurt Book Fair 2025
- Born: 1956 (age 69–70); Amarah, Iraq
- Occupations: Novelist and journalist

Najem Wali (Arabic: نجم والي; born 1956) is an Iraqi novelist and journalist, based in Germany.

== Life ==
Born in Amarah, Wali fled Iraq in 1980 after the outbreak of the Iran–Iraq War. He lives in Hamburg. Wali has published seven books. He is a correspondent for Al Hayat and has written in Süddeutsche Zeitung, Die Zeit, Neue Zürcher Zeitung, and elsewhere. In 2009 he published "Reise in das Herz des Feindes" ("Journey into the Heart of the Enemy"), an account of his travels in Israel, which presented a positive view of the country.

Officially Najem Wali was – as with millions of Iraqis – born on July 1, 1956. But the truth is that he was born on October 20, 1956, in the south of Iraq. This is just one of many stories in the country of thousand and one dictatorship und thousand and more wars. Having finished his A-Levels in Basra and Amara (his official places of birth, by the way) he began his studies of German Literature at the University of Baghdad. Having passed his university degrees in 1978 he was drafted for military service. In 1980 and during the military service he was arrested and tortured as a "dissenter" and "opponent of war". A miracle made him come clear and he continued the military service up to his discharge in August 1980.

Not long after the Iran–Iraq War started on September 22, 1980, young men in his age were drafted again. He didn't want to go to war, so he decided to leave the country. It wasn't easy to get an exit visa, not least because his name was on the list of people who were not allowed to leave the country. But with the help of bribe and some friends he was able leave Iraq half legally half illegally. He came to the Federal Republic of Germany on November 8, 1980, where he continued his studies of German Language and Literature and obtained the degree of Magister Artium. His thesis dealt with Jakob Michael Reinhold Maria Lenz's Der Hofmeister und die Soldaten und die neuen Interpretationen bei Bertold Brecht und Heiner Kipphardt.

In 1987 Najem Wali went to Madrid to study Spanish literature. In 1990 he returned to Hamburg. Several study visits followed, for example to Oxford in 1993 and to Florence in 1995.

Najem Wali started writing early. He wrote his first story in the age of 16 and began to work as a journalist for Radio Bagdhad and a weekly magazine when he was still a student. His novel The Journey to Tell al-Lahm was published by Carl Hanser publishing in 2004 and by DTV in 2010. Having become a bestseller and been reprinted several times – especially in the Gulf States, Saudi Arabia, Iraq and Egypt, the book soon advanced to a cult novel.

On behalf of the IOM (International Organization for Migration) Najem Wali helped to organize the first Iraqi elections (January and February 2005) from his German exile. In 2002 he accompanied Günter Grass on his journey to Yemen and took part in many international meetings and conferences, for the last time at the University of Haifa in March 2007 in a meeting themed "Quo Vadis Iraq?"

Today Najem Wali mainly lives in Berlin and works as a freelance author, journalist and culture correspondent of the most important Arabic daily newspaper Al Hayat, as well as Al Mada and the Tattoo Magazine which are based in Baghdad. His books have been translated into several languages. Najem Wali also writes for well known German-language newspapers on a regular basis, such as the Süddeutsche Zeitung, Neue Zürcher Zeitung, and Die Zeit.

== Awards and honors ==
- 2015: Jan Michalski Prize for Literature finalist for Bagdad Marlboro: Ein Roman für Bradley Manning

== Works ==
=== Arabic editions ===
- War in the Night Club District, Sahara, Damascus 1993.
- The last night of Marie, narratives, Dar Sharquiat, Cairo 1995.
- A place called Kumait, novel, Dar Sharquiat, Cairo 1997
- Waltzing Matilda, narratives, Dar Al Meda, Damascus 1999.
- Tel Al Laham, novel, Dar Alsaqi, London, Beirut 2001. (New edition: Merit, Cairo 2005)
- Jussif's Picture, novel, Al Markaz, Beirut, Casablanca, 2005. (New edition: Merit, Cairo 2008)
- The South Angel, novel, Kaleembooks, Dubai 2009. (New edition: Dar Al Mada, Damascus, Beirut and Baghdad 2010)
- Baghdad … Marlboro, a novel for Bradley Manning, Arabic Institute for Studies and Publication, Amman, Beirut, 2012

=== Translated editions ===
- Engel des Südens (The South Angel), novel, Hanser, 2011, translated by Imke Ahlf-Wien
- Reise in das Herz des Feindes, ein Iraker in Israel (Journey into the Enemy’s Heart, an Iraqi in Israel), Hanser publishing 2009, translated by Imke Ahlf-Wien
- Jussifs Gesichter (Jussif’s Picture), novel, Hanser, 2008, translated by Imke Ahlf-Wien
- Die Reise nach Tell al-Lahm (The Journey to Tell al-Lahm), novel, translated by Imke Ahlf-Wien
- Der Krieg im Vergnügungsviertel (War in the Nightclub District), novel, 1989, translated by Jürgen Paul
- Hier in dieser fernen Stadt (Here in this Faraway City), Galgenberg 1990
- Wars in Distant Lands, short story, 2008, translated by Raymond Stock
