= The Earth Transformed =

2023 non-fiction book by Peter Frankopan

The Earth Transformed: An Untold History
- Author: Peter Frankopan
- Language: English
- Publication date: 2023

The Earth Transformed: An Untold History is a 2023 non-fiction book by English historian Peter Frankopan. It discusses the interactions between human societies and the environment throughout history.

Frankopan argues that droughts, volcanic eruptions, the Little Ice Age, Medieval Warm Period and contemporary climate change impacted and coincided with societal change, such as the Classic Maya collapse and expansion of the Mongol Empire.

Walter Scheidel gave the book a positive review in Financial Times. The Times and Geographical also published positive reviews. Felipe Fernández-Armesto wrote a balanced review, while Geoff Mann critically reviewed the book.
