= The New Silk Roads =

2018 nonfiction book by Peter Frankopan

The New Silk Roads: The Present and Future of The World
- Author: Peter Frankopan
- Cover artist: Emma Ewbank
- Language: English
- Genre: Nonfiction
- Publisher: Knopf
- Publication date: November 15, 2018
- Publication place: United States
- Pages: 285
- ISBN: 978-0-525-65640-1
- Preceded by: The Silk Roads
- Website: https://www.peterfrankopan.com/the-new-silk-roads.html

The New Silk Roads: The Present and Future of The World is a 2018 non-fiction book by English historian Peter Frankopan. The full text is divided into 5 chapters. The author discusses the recent rise of Asia's economic and geopolitical strength.

== Reception ==
The Daily Telegraph, The Times, The Financial Times, The Guardian, The London Evening Standard, and The Irish Times published positive reviews.
