= Ingrid Detter de Frankopan =

Swedish scholar of international law

Thyra Ingrid Hildegard Detter de Frankopan (born 1936) is a Swedish scholar of international law, Lindhagen Professor Emerita at Stockholm University, a practising barrister, and the author of multiple books.

== Education and career ==
Detter earned a doctorate in 1962 from the Faculty of Law, University of Oxford; her dissertation was titled, Treaty-making power of international organisations. She completed another doctorate in 1965 from Stockholm University; her dissertation was Law Making by International Organizations. As of 1988, she was Carl Lindhagen Professor of International Law at Stockholm University, and also held an affiliation with the London School of Economics.

She was called to the bar in 1977 and is a member of the Three Stone commercial chancery chambers in Lincoln's Inn.

== Books ==
Detter's books include:

- Law Making by International Organizations (Norstedt, 1965)
- Essays on the Law of Treaties (Norstedt, 1967)
- The East African Community and Common Market (Longmans, 1970)
- Finance and Protection of Investments in Developing Countries (Gower, 1974; 2nd ed., 1987)
- International Law and the Independent State (Gower, 1974; 2nd ed., 1988)
- International Adoptions and the Conflict of Laws (Almqvist & Wiksell, 1975)
- Bibliography of International Law (Bowker, 1975)
- The Concept of International Law (Norstedt, 1987; 2nd ed., 1995)
- The Law of War (Cambridge University Press, 1988; 3rd ed., 2017)
- The International Legal Order (Dartmouth Publishing, 1994)

== Personal life ==
Detter married Louis Doimi de Lupis, a Croatian man who later called himself Louis Doimi de Frankopan. Their daughter Paola married Lord Nicholas Windsor of the British royal family, becoming Lady Nicholas Windsor, and their son Peter Frankopan, a historian and hotelier, married Sainsbury heiress Jessica Sainsbury.
