= Peter Frankopan =

British historian, writer and hotelier (born 1971)

Peter Frankopan FRHistS FRSL FRGS FRAI FRSA
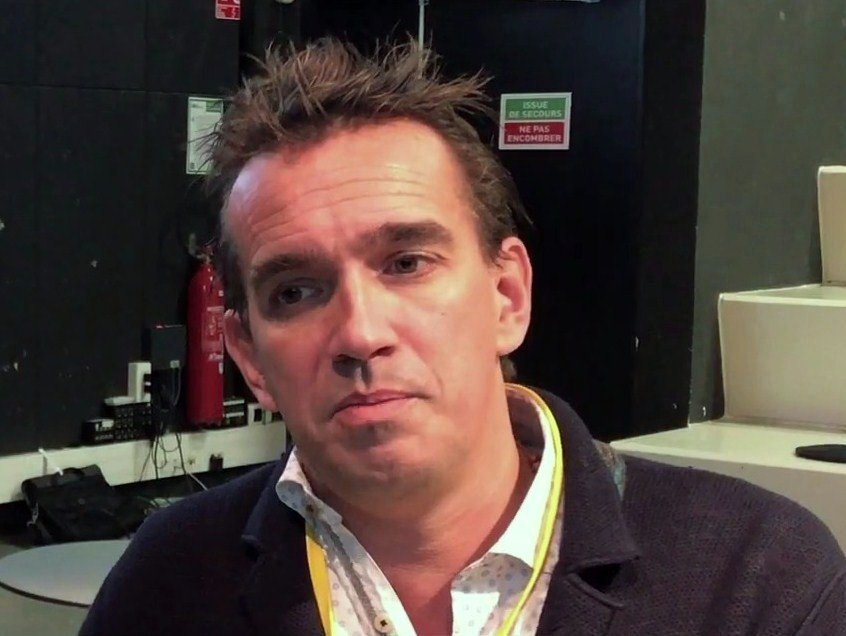
- Photo of Peter Frankopan, taken in November 2018
- Born: 22 March 1971 (age 55); England
- Occupations: Historian and academic
- Spouse: Jessica Sainsbury
- Children: 4
- Parent(s): Don Louis Doimi de Lupis; Ingrid Detter
- Relatives: Lady Nicholas Windsor (sister)

Academic background
- Education: Eton College; Jesus College, Cambridge (BA); Corpus Christi College, Oxford (DPhil)
- Thesis: The foreign policy of Emperor Alexios I Komnenos (1081-c.1100) (1998)
- Doctoral advisor: James Howard-Johnston

Academic work
- Discipline: History
- Sub-discipline: Middle Ages; Late antiquity; History of the Byzantine Empire; Crusades
- Institutions: Worcester College, Oxford; King's College, Cambridge

Peter Frankopan (born 22 March 1971) is a British historian, writer, and hotelier. He is a professor of global history at Worcester College, Oxford, and the Director of the Oxford Centre for Byzantine Research. He is also professor of Silk Roads studies at the University of Cambridge, a bye-fellow of King's College and associate director of the UNESCO Silk Roads programme. He is a fellow of the Royal Asiatic Society and President of the Royal Society for Asian Affairs. He is best known for his 2015 book The Silk Roads.

== Early life, ancestry and education ==
Frankopan is the second of five children born to Croatian Louis Doimi de Lupis (later added Frankopan Šubić) (1939–2018) and a Swedish-born barrister and professor of international law Ingrid Detter. His elder sister is Lady Nicholas Windsor. By birth, Peter is a member of an ancient, untitled Croatian nobility of Italian origin who can trace their noble lineage back to 1200, with Domnius Doymi, nobilis traguriensis as their earlist known ancestor. His father, Louis Doimi de Lupis, has faced allegations that he is not a member of the extinct Italian aristocratic Frankopan family.

The Doimi family was granted nobility of the Island of Brazza in 1390 by King Tvrtko I of Bosnia and nobility of Spalato in 1413 by Sigismund, Holy Roman Emperor as the King of Hungary. Their status was later elevated with a grant of Venetian nobility in 1753. The compound surname Doimi de Lupis originated around 1765 through the marriage between the noble Doimi and the comital de Lupis families, officially merging the two lineages. Members of the family were granted Austrian nobility in 1855 and the hereditary title of Ritter in 1865. The family also owned an ancestral Vukašinović-Dojmi palace in the town of Vis, built in the turn of the 18th century, on the Adriatic coast. They welcomed and hosted Franz Joseph I of Austria during his official visit to Vis island on 12 May 1875.

Peter attended Eton College and then received a degree in Byzantine history from Jesus College, Cambridge, before getting his D.Phil. at Corpus Christi College, Oxford. He is a senior research fellow at Worcester College, Oxford, and director of the Oxford Centre for Byzantine Research. His areas of focus are the history of the Byzantine Empire, the Mediterranean, the Balkans, the Caucasus, and Russia, as well as the interdependence of Islam and Christianity. He has also studied Greek literature of the Middle Ages.

== Writing career ==
Frankopan's first book of history, The First Crusade: The Call from the East, was published in 2012. The book received a five-star review in the Daily Telegraph from Nicholas Shakespeare, who called it a "persuasive and bracing work" and said: "Peter Frankopan is not yet well known, but he deserves to be." Michael Dirda, in The Washington Post, praised this "carefully researched book." Thomas F. Madden, specialist on the Crusades, seems more critical:

There are today so many histories of the First Crusade jostling for shelf space that new authors are forced to find ways to differentiate theirs from all of the others. In some cases this has led to genuinely innovative approaches; in others, rather awkward attempts at novelty have resulted. This is one of the latter.

In 2015, Frankopan's book The Silk Roads: A New History of the World was published. Writing in the Telegraph, Bettany Hughes praised it as a "charismatic and essential book", while Anthony Sattin, writing in The Guardian, called it "ambitious" and "full of insight but let down by factual errors". Frankopan's follow-up book, The New Silk Roads: The Present and Future of the World (Bloomsbury Publishing), was published in 2018.

In March 2023, Bloomsbury published Frankopan's The Earth Transformed: An Untold History, described as a history of the world, written from a fundamentally environmental perspective. It was reviewed in The New York Review of Books by Christopher de Bellaigue.

Frankopan was elected a Fellow of the Royal Society of Literature in 2020.

== Hotels ==
In 2002, Frankopan and his wife Jessica opened Cowley Manor, a boutique hotel and spa on an historic estate in the Cotswolds. They have since expanded their hotel chain, which they named A Curious Group of Hotels, to include the Portobello Hotel in London, Canal House in Amsterdam and L'Hotel Paris in Paris. The restaurant in L'Hotel Paris has been awarded a Michelin star.

== Honours and awards ==
Frankopan is an elected fellow of the Royal Historical Society, the Royal Asiatic Society, the Royal Society of Literature, the Royal Society of Arts, the Royal Geographical Society and the Royal Anthropological Institute. He is also president of the Royal Society for Asian Affairs.

In 2019, Prospect magazine listed Frankopan as one of the world's top 50 thinkers. He has chaired the panel of judges for numerous literary prizes, including the Anglo-Hellenic League's Runciman Award (2019–23); the Royal Society of Literature's Ondaatje Prize (2020); the Cundill History Prize (2020); and the Orwell Prize (2024).

Frankopan has held visiting fellowships at Harvard and Princeton universities. In 2017, he held the Scaliger visiting professorship at Leiden University. He is a member of the advisory board of the Sevgi Gönül Center for Byzantine Studies at Koç University in Istanbul. In October 2026, he became an honorary Captain in the Royal Navy.

== Personal life ==
Frankopan played for the Croatian national cricket team. In 2015, he said "That’s the achievement I’m proudest of – playing cricket for my country." He also plays for the Authors XI cricket team with other British writers and contributed a chapter to the book that team members collectively wrote about their first season playing together, The Authors XI: A Season of English Cricket from Hackney to Hambledon (2013).

In May 2016, Frankopan was one of 300 prominent historians, including Simon Schama and Niall Ferguson, who were signatories to a letter printed in The Guardian, telling voters that if they chose to leave the European Union on 23 June, they would be condemning Britain to irrelevance.

Frankopan and his wife Jessica, daughter of Sir Tim Sainsbury, have four children and live in Oxford. Together, they oversee a £14 million trust funded by her family's supermarket fortune. In 2008, they gave a benefaction to fund a permanent director of the Centre for Gender Studies at the University of Cambridge, the couple's alma mater. The post is named the Frankopan Director of Gender Studies in their honour.

== Publications ==
=== Monographs ===
- The First Crusade: The Call from the East. Belknap Press. 2012. ISBN 9780674059948.
- The Silk Roads: A New History of the World. Bloomsbury. 2015. ISBN 9781408839973.
- The New Silk Roads: The Present and Future of the World. Bloomsbury. 2018. ISBN 9781526607423.
- The Silk Roads: An Illustrated New History of the World. Bloomsbury. 2018. ISBN 9781408889930.
- The Earth Transformed: An Untold History, Bloomsbury, ISBN 9781526622563, 2023

=== Edited books ===
- The Hippodrome of Constantinople
- The Statues of Constantinople
- Encyclopedia of the Bible and its Reception
- The Chora Church of Constantinople
