= Paul Chirakkarode =

Dalit Christian writer and activist

Paul Chirakkarode (4 September 1938 - 4 August 2008) was a noted Malayalam- and English-language author, social critic, orator, and human rights activist. The author has been considered one of the pioneers of Dalit Literary Movement in India.

== Personal life ==
Chirakkarode was born in Maramon, a small village situated on the banks of Pamba river, near Thiruvalla in the Pathanamthitta district of Kerala. He belonged to a Christian family. His father, Rev LT Daniel, was well known among the people of his village as a teacher, social worker, and as Missionary. His mother's name was Elikutty. Chirakkarode went to Maramon High School and attended University College Thiruvananthapuram, now part of the University of Kerala, where he later attended law school. He also earned master's degrees in English literature, Malayalam literature, economics, and sociology. Chirakkarode died in Thiruvananthapuram, Kerala.

== Literary life ==
Chirakkarode started his literary life in 1955, at the age of seventeen, by publishing his first novel Alinju Theernna Athmav (Dissolved Soul). Then he wrote a number of short stories and novels, such as Pravasam (Living in Exile), Aavaranam (The Covering), Sathyathinte Mugham (The Face of Truth), and Pulayathara (The Hut of Pulaya). Among these novels, Pulayathara has been considered one of his masterpieces. In this the novelist traces the saga of Dalit Christians and their aspirations in a picturesque style. Chirakkarode's works came out even before the dawn of Dalit Literary Movement emerged in Maharashtra during the 1970s.

Through his study on Bertrand Russell, Chirakkarode proved his creative talent as a biographer. This study collected a special award from the Kerala Sahithya Academy, in 1962; the Government of Kerala selected it as the best book of the year.

Besides the biography of Bertrand Russell, Chirakkarode wrote biographies of David Livingstone and Rabindranath Tagore. The critical studies of Paul include Ambedkar: Bhauthika Vikshobhanathinde Theejwala (Ambedkar: the flare of intellectual turbulence), Dalit Christians Keralathil (Dalits Christian in Kerala) and Dalit Sahithya Pathangal (Dalit literary studies 2 Vols.) His study on Ambedkar, is considered one of the best books ever written in such a manner in Malayalam on Babasaheb Ambedkar, the Architect of Indian Constitution, and his thoughts. Paul Chirakkarode's critical studies in English includes Dalits and the left; The Subalttern Emergence, and several essays. These works mainly analyze the socioeconomic conditions of the subaltern sections of the caste-ridden Indian society.

He was the founder editor of Padavukal, a news journal magazine published by the Department of Social Welfare, Government of Kerala, during 2001–2005. In the second phase of his writings, Chirakkarode entered the field of socio-literacy critical studies. Among these studies, four works were published in Malayalam and two were in English. During this period he wrote around 56 novels and 2 biographies.

== Works ==
- Mathil (The Wall),
- Nizhal (The Shadow),
- Oru Maidanam; Kure vazhikal (A Play ground, Many Paths),
- Aadimayum Yajmananum (The Slave and the Master),
- Anuragam Anaswarmanu (Love is Immortal),
- Dhughathinte Panapathram (Gobet of Sorrow),
- Oru Kudumbam Parichunattu (A family transplanted),
- Nanaja Bhoomi (The wet land-stories),
- Irulil Alinja Velicham ( The light lost in the dark),
- Kayam (The Chasm), Vellithira (The silver screen),
- Ooshara Bhoomi (The Fterile Land),
- Chathuppunilam (The Marshy Land),
- Azhimugham (Estuary),
- Vedhanakalude Thazhvara (The Valley of Sorrows),
- Akshayapathram (The Vessel of Plenty), Bheerukkal (The Cowards),
- Sooryakanthi (The Sun Flower),
- Olichupokunna Mankoonakal (The Eroded Earthen Huts),
- Angeyude Rajyam Varename (Let They Kingdom Come). Chilanthivala (The Spider's Web),
- Ekanthathayude Dweep (The Island of loneliness),
- Udatham (Loftiness), Nyayasanam (The Thorne of Justice),
- Aa Velicham (That light),
- Parudheesa (The Paradise),
- Athum Sambhavichu (That too Happened),
- Velichem (The light),
- Puthiya Paarpidum (The New Dwelling Place),
- Annathe Appam (The Daily Bread), Kurumba (Kurumba) etc.

== Academic activities ==
Chirakkarode served as faculty in various academic Institutions in India such as the United Theological College in Bangalore, Dalit Open University in Andhara Pradesh, Gurukkal Theological College in Chennai, and Ambedkar Academy in New Delhi. Considering his lifetime contribution to literature and social studies, the Anglican Academy of Religious Studies, Philadelphia, honored him by awarding a doctoral degree in June 2006.

== Human rights activities ==
As a human rights activist Chirakkarode stood strongly along with the crusade of the downtrodden people in India and their socio-cultural revolts in modern times. He was one among the leaders of Guruvayoor Padhayathra conducted by Indian Dalit Federation demanding the abolition of separate and, discriminatory feedings systems existed in Guruvayoor temple under the chains of caste system. The much-debated agitation was conducted by the Indian Dalit Federation, a social organization in 1983. In 1989, Chirakkarode lead a tribal march from Sulthan Batheri to Trivandrum, demanding the alienated land for the tribal people of Kerala. This agitation is considered as first emergence of tribal movement in Kerala for their alienated land. He was one among the leaders who took initiative in the formation of NAPM in associated with the noted environment activist Medha Patkar. He was also in the leadership of Indian Labour Party and Bahujana Samaj Party during its formation in Kerala.
