= The Silk Roads =

World history book

- First edition book cover
- Author: Peter Frankopan
- Illustrator: Neil Packer (illustrated edition, 2018)
- Language: English
- Genre: History
- Publisher: Bloomsbury
- Publication date: August 27, 2015
- Media type: Print (hardcover and paperback), e-book, audiobook
- Pages: 636
- ISBN: 978-1-4088-3997-3
- OCLC: 943517265
- Followed by: The New Silk Roads
- Website: https://www.peterfrankopan.com/the-silk-roads.html

The Silk Roads: A New History of the World is a 2015 non-fiction book written by English historian Peter Frankopan, a historian at the University of Oxford. A new abridged edition was illustrated by Neil Packer. The full text is divided into 25 chapters. The author combines the development of the world with the Silk Road.

== Reception ==
Reviews on The Silk Roads were generally positive. Positive reviews appeared in The Guardian, The Independent, The Telegraph, The Times. and The New York Review of Books. The Guardian's review of the book in 2015 was positive: "The Silk Roads is full of intriguing insights and some fascinating details". As early as 1587, playwright Christopher Marlowe referred to Persia/Iran as "the centre of the globe," and many historians agreed. Frankopan, on the other hand, went further than many others before him, diving deeper into the archives and quoting more manuscripts to support his argument. The Independent considers the book "A bold, if imperfect, study that paints a picture of the past from a new perspective". The New York Times commented that "The danger of glibness is never far, but it is always held off, and I have to say that 'Silk Roads' is what my old friend the historian Norman Stone used to describe as 'an old-fashioned good book'".

According to anthropologist and archaeologist Nikolay Kradin, each chapter's heading is highly intriguing. He adds that Frankopan masterfully balances history with literature, so that the book is accessible even to those who are unfamiliar with history. Researchers K. Laug and S. Rance concluded that the advent of the Silk Road caused countries to seek shared interests as a result of a lack of collaboration among European countries. The rise of fascism reflected a change in the economic balance of power. In the shifting economic and political structure of Western countries, Frankopan rightly points out the weaknesses of liberal democracy.

According to the aforementioned K. Laug and S. Rance, the Silk Road helped India's economy to grow swiftly, but Frankopan failed to account for the country's rapid population expansion and the increasing wealth gap. Marcal Sanmartí found several minor inaccuracies in the book, as well as other components that were missing, although for a 650-page book this may be considered insignificant. He concludes his study by telling the reader that this book is an anti-Eurocentrism collection, not a tool for comprehending world history. Sanmartí disagrees with Frankopan's assertion that there is no longer any space on Earth for nations to compete for, implying that Eurasia would return to its former position as the world's centre.

Frankopan's dismissive attitude towards Northern European engagement in the Asian slave trade, while ignoring the substantial demand for such captives in Central Asian and Middle Eastern markets, is also problematic, according to Alexandra Leonzini. Throughout the book, Frankopan emphasizes the Europeans' heinous activities while ignoring the equally heinous atrocities committed simultaneously in Eurasia. Ramachandra Guha argues that from the beginning of the book through Columbus's voyages, the description of the Black Death brings the subject into the modern part, and afterwards it has lost the "focus" it was meant to express. To Guha the book provides an outdated history that lacks a description of much of human life. Poor people and women do not appear. Frankopan points out the role in history of mainly European personalities, without mentioning figures such as Mustafa Kemal Atatürk or Ho Chi Minh.
