= Hayler =

Hayler is an English surname. Notable people with the surname include:

- Damon Hayler (born 1976), Australian snowboarder
- Franz Hayler (1900–1972), German businessman and Nazi politician
- Kieran Hayler, ex-husband of Katie Price
- Mark Judge (architect) (1847–1927), born Mark Hayler, British architect and sanitary engineer
- Robert W. Hayler, American vice admiral
  - USS Hayler

== See also ==
- Ernest Hayler Hannaford, Australian farmer and politician
- Hayter
