= Basile Panurgias =

French writer (born 1967)

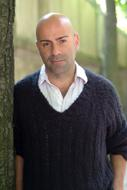

Basile Panurgias is a French writer. He was born in Paris in 1967. He studied art history before devoting himself to writing. He is the author of several novels, among them Soho, Perdre le nord (nominated for the 2016 European Book Prize) and Le Pinkie-Pinkie. He has authored other books like Le Doute (finalist for the Prix de Flore), L'inconnue de la Factory, Le rire de Pékin and many others.

Panurgias has lived in New York, London, and Copenhagen.
