= Agnès Verlet =

French academic, psychoanalyst, and writer

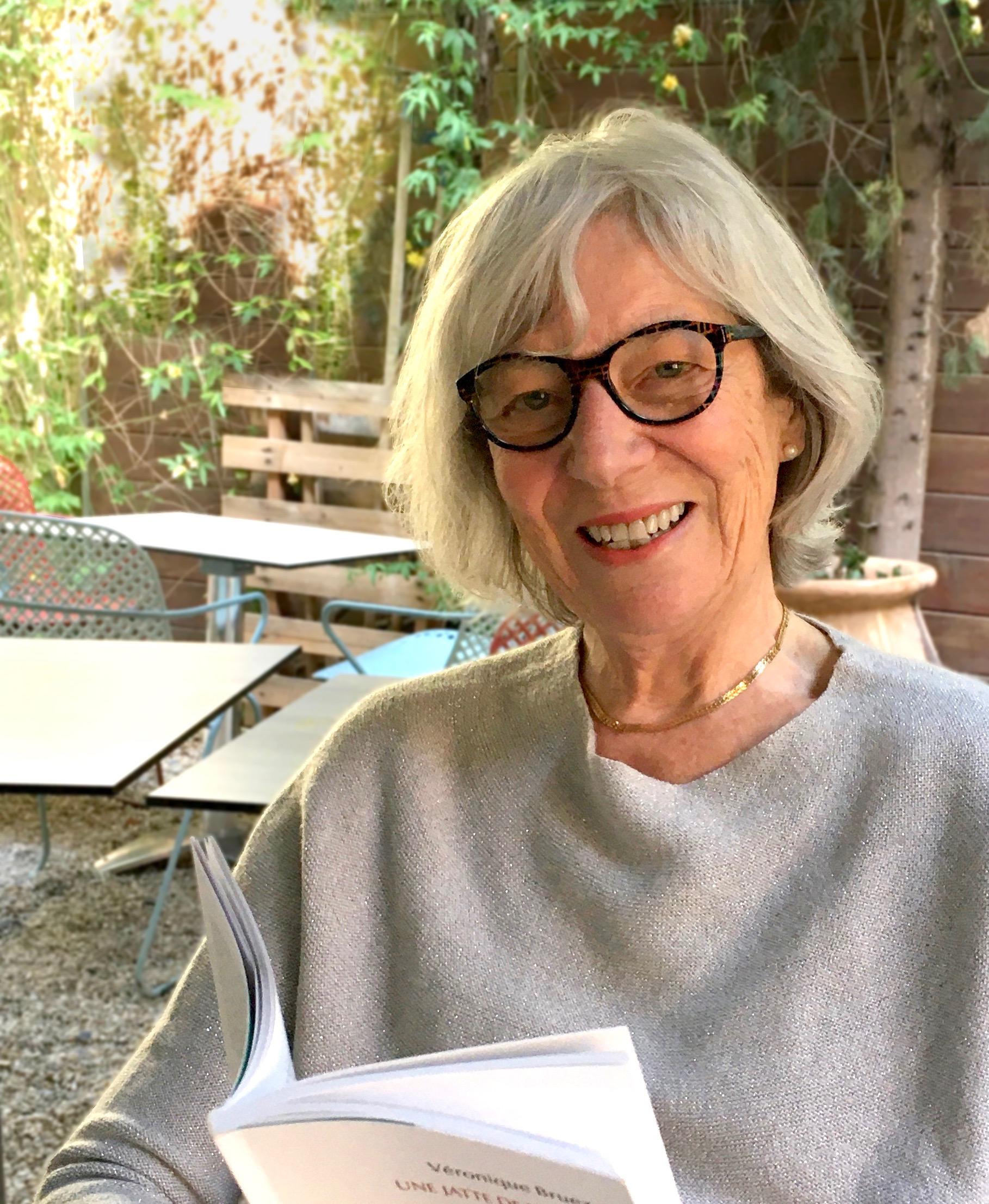
- Born: 14 July 1947 (age 77); 16th arrondissement, Paris, France
- Occupation(s): Academic, psychoanalyst, writer

Academic background
- Education: University of Paris 3 (PhD)

Agnès Verlet (14 July 1947, Paris) is a French academic, psychoanalyst, and writer.

== Early life and education ==
Agnès Verlet was born on 14 July 1947 in the 16th arrondissement of Paris into a family of museum conservators. She also studied art history (licentiate) and musicology (first prize in musical aesthetics from the National Conservatory of Music in Paris).

In 1988, she defended a thesis on Chateaubriand and Vanities at the University of Paris 3 under the supervision of Philippe Berthier (Marc Fumaroli, Jean-Claude Berchet, and Jean-Claude Bonnet were on the jury).

== Career ==
In 1995, she returned to Paris where she practiced psychoanalysis (affiliate member of the Société de Psychanalyse Freudienne (SPF), and of Empreintes et Arts). At the SPF, she conducted a seminar and collaborated on several conferences related to art: Passion amoureuse, SPF 2012; Les figures féminines de la Grèce ancienne, SPF 2015 in Paris, 2017 in Athens; Désir et création, SPF 2018.

Working with researchers (GRAAL) and architects (SFA) on the interaction between literature and architecture, she participated in several conferences with the SFA. She co-directed, in 2009, a Cerisy conference on this subject: Architecture and Literature: An Interaction in Question, Presses de l’Université de Provence, 2014. She also wrote texts on contemporary artists: 2004: Denis Pondruel, Ways to Enter an Empty Room, Galerie Duchamp. 2008, The Don Juan Object, "The Game of Desire", Friville edition. 2010: Ivlita Moudjiri, Sillages, "Masquerades", Klincksieck. 2012: Colette Deblé, "The Metamorphoses of Diana or the Gentle Passion of Colette Deblé, Campagne Première. 2014: "Architectural Fiction and Novelistic Fiction: Fernand Pouillon", Europe. 2017: "The Fierce Autonomy of the Arts: Interview with Paul Andreu", Europe.

From 2005 to 2015, she collaborated with Gallimard editions as an author of texts on painting by doing image readings for the “Folioplus Classique" collection (about fifty titles).

She is the author of numerous articles on literature, art, and psychoanalysis, several essays or critical works, as well as fiction (novel, theater, short stories). She has collaborated with the Magazine littéraire and contributes to reviews including Europe and the Letters of the SPF.

She is a member of the Maison des écrivains et de la littérature and the Société des gens de lettres (SDGL).

== Publications ==
- Yseult et Tristan, play, L'Harmattan, 1978.
- La Messagère de rien, novel, Séguier, 1997.
- Pierres parlantes. Florilège d'épitaphes parisiennes du Moyen ge à la fin du XVIIIe siècle, anthology, Commission des travaux historiques de la Ville de Paris, 2000.
- Les Vanités de Chateaubriand. Histoire des idées et critique littéraire (in French). Paris: Droz. 2001. p. 367. ISBN 2-600-00644-3.
- Chateaubriand. Les aventures du dernier Abencerage, Gallimard, 2006.
- Écrire des rêves, anthology, Gallimard, 2006.
- Les Violons brulés, novel, Éditions de la Différence, 2006, reissued in 2014.
- Le bouclier d'Alexandre. Literature. Paris: Éditions de la Différence. 2014. p. 287. ISBN 978-2-7291-2074-0.

== Editorial contributions ==
From 2004 to 2015, collaboration with Gallimard Folioplus classiques for cross-readings of images with an integral text and its commentary.

- Colette, Dialogues de bêtes/ Gauguin, Arearea.
- Camus, The Stranger/ Hopper, Conference at Night.
- Charles Juliet, Fragments/Giacometti, Portrait of the Artist's Mother.
- Van Gogh, Letters to Theo/ Van Gogh, Wheatfield with Crows.
- Céline, Journey to the End of the Night/ Bruegel, The Fight Between Carnival and Lent.
- Writing about Painting (anthology) / Hubert Robert, Plan for the Great Gallery of the Louvre.
- Pierre Peju, The Little Chartreuse/ Vieira da Silva, The Luminous Exit.
- Luigi Pirandello, Six Characters in Search of an Author/ Ensor, Ensor with Masks.
- Benjamin Constant, Adolphe/ Ingres, Madame de Senonnes.
- Marguerite Yourcenar, Oriental Tales/ Gustave Moreau, Orpheus.
- Molière, Amphitryon/ Lorenzo Lippi, Allegory of Simulation.
- Malraux, Man's Fate/ Goya, The Third of May 1808.
- Correspondence between Mothers and Daughters/ Leonardo da Vinci, Saint Anne, the Virgin, and Child Jesus.
- Chateaubriand Memoirs from Beyond the Grave IX to XII/ Poussin, The Plague of Azoth.
- André Gide, The Counterfeiters/ Delacroix, The Battle of Jacob with the Angel.
- Balzac, The Duchess of Langeais/ Bernini, Saint Teresa.
- Zola, L'Assommoir/ Rubens, The Kermis, or Village Wedding.
- Racine, Phèdre/ Cabanel, Phèdre.
- The Encyclopedia (anthology)/ Lemonnier, An Evening at Madame Geoffrin's.
- Balzac, The Elixir of Long Life/ Rembrandt, Self-Portrait with Saskia.
- Molière, The Precious Ridicules / Claude Deruet, The Air.
- Alain-Fournier, The Lost Domain/ Watteau, The Embarkation for Cythera.
- Tristan and Isolde (Bédier) / Anonymous, 15th-century miniature.
- Camus, The Just Assassins/ Fautrier, Hostage Head.
- Kafka, Letter to His Father/ Kokoschka, Self-Portrait.
- Rimbaud, Illuminations/ Robert Delaunay, The Red Tower.
- Quignard, All the World's Mornings/ Baschenis, Still Life with Musical Instruments.
- Racine, Mithridates/ Delacroix, Horses Fighting in a Stable.
- Hugo, Pauca Meae/ Odilon Redon, Ophelia.
- Aloysius Bertrand, Gaspard of the Night/ Teniers, The King Drinks.
- Duras, The Pain/ Matisse, The Black Door.
- Balzac, The Quest of the Absolute/Thomas Wyck, Alchemist in His Laboratory.
- Radiguet, The Ball of the Count d'Orgel/ Seurat, The Circus.
- Semprun, Literature or Life/ Zoran Music, Dalmatian Landscape.
- Victor Hugo, The Intervention / Édouard Manet, The Railway
- Duras, The Music/ Hopper, Automat.
- Apollinaire, Alcools/Picasso, Saltimbanques.
- Proust, Swann's Way/ Bonnard, Terrace at Vernon
- Oscar Wilde, The Picture of Dorian Gray/ Lucian Freud, Self-Portrait.
- Bernardin de Saint-Pierre, Paul and Virginie/ Joseph Vernet, Storm
- Stephan Zweig, Chess Story/ Marcel Duchamp, The Chess Game.
- Beaumarchais, The Barber of Seville/ Fragonard, Young Musician.
- Maupassant, A Life/ Courbet, The Wave.
- Sophocles, Oedipus Rex/ Bacon, Oedipus After Ingres.
- Madame de La Fayette, The Princess of Montpensier/ Rubens, Portrait of Brigida Spinola Doria.
- Musset, Don't Trifle with Love/ Picasso, The Kiss.
