= Frank Huyler =

American novelist

- Born: September 24, 1964 (age 61); Berkeley, California, U.S.
- Education: Williams College; University of North Carolina at Chapel Hill
- Occupation: Physician
- Medical career
- Field: Emergency medicine
- Notable works: The Blood of Strangers: True Stories from the Emergency Room (1999)

Frank Huyler (born September 24, 1964) is an American emergency physician, poet and author in Albuquerque, New Mexico. He is best known for his book The Blood of Strangers: True Stories from the Emergency Room which has been translated into a number of languages.

== Early life and education ==
Frank Huyler was born in 1964, in Berkeley, California, to parents who were both teachers at international schools. He attended kindergarten in London, and moved to Iran with his family when he was in his teens.

He is a graduate of Williams College and received his medical education at the University of North Carolina at Chapel Hill from where he qualified as a physician in 1996.

== Career ==
Huyler practices as an emergency physician in Albuquerque, New Mexico.

== Writing ==
Huyler has published a number of books of poetry, fiction, and non-fiction. He is best known for his book The Blood of Strangers: True Stories from the Emergency Room which has been translated into a number of languages. His most recent collection of essays, White Hot Light, are "tales from the emergency room, told with no-nonsense brevity, clarity, and compassion"

== Selected publications ==
- The Blood of Strangers: True Stories from the Emergency Room. University of California Press, Berkeley, 1999. ISBN 0-520-21863-9.
- The Laws of Invisible Things (2004)
- Right of Thirst (2009)
- White Hot Light: Twenty-Five Years in Emergency Medicine. Harper Perennial. ISBN 0-062-93733-2
