= Nandamuri–Nara family =

Indian political and film family

- Family
- Country: India
- Origin: Krishna and Tirupati district, Andhra Pradesh
- Founded: Telugu Desam Party
- Members: N. T. Rama Rao, Nara Chandrababu Naidu, Nandamuri Harikrishna, Nandamuri Balakrishna, Daggubati Purandeswari, Nandamuri Mohana Krishna, Nara Lokesh, N. T. Rama Rao Jr., Nandamuri Kalyan Ram, Taraka Ratna
- Traditions: Telugu, Hindu
- Heirlooms: Basavatarakam Indo American Cancer Hospital, NTR Trust, Ramakrishna Cine Studios, N. T. R. Arts, Heritage Foods

The Nandamuri–Nara family is a prominent Indian political and film family known for their work in Indian politics and Telugu cinema. The family, spanning at least three generations, is involved in politics, films, and business ventures. The prominent heads of the family are politician and actor Nandamuri Taraka Rama Rao and his son-in-law, the politician Nara Chandrababu Naidu.

== Overview ==
The Nandamuri–Nara is a Telugu family with origins in the villages of Nimmakuru and Naravaripalle in the Indian state of Andhra Pradesh. They are one of the most prominent families in Indian politics and Indian cinema.

== Family members ==
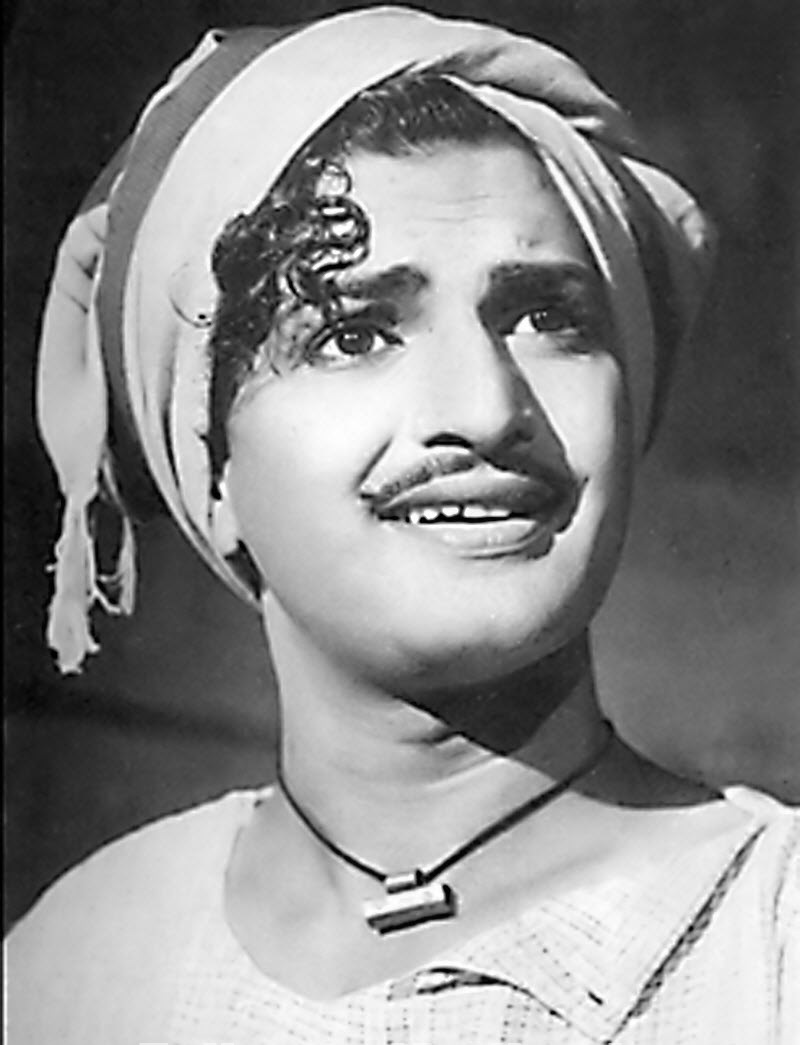
N. T. Rama Rao

Nandamuri Taraka Rama Rao, often referred to by his initials NTR, was an Indian actor, film director, film producer, screenwriter, film editor, philanthropist and politician who served as the Chief Minister of Andhra Pradesh for seven years over four terms. He is regarded as one of the most influential actors in the history of Indian cinema. He starred in over 300 films, predominantly in Telugu cinema, and was referred to as "Viswa Vikhyatha Nata Sarvabhouma" (transl. Universally renowned star of acting). He founded the Telugu Desam Party (TDP) in 1982 and served four tumultuous terms as Chief Minister of Andhra Pradesh between 1983 and 1995. He was known as an advocate of Andhra Pradesh's distinct cultural identity, distinguishing it from the erstwhile Madras State with which it was often associated. NTR married Basava Rama Tarakam. The marriage resulted in twelve children; including eight sons and four daughters.

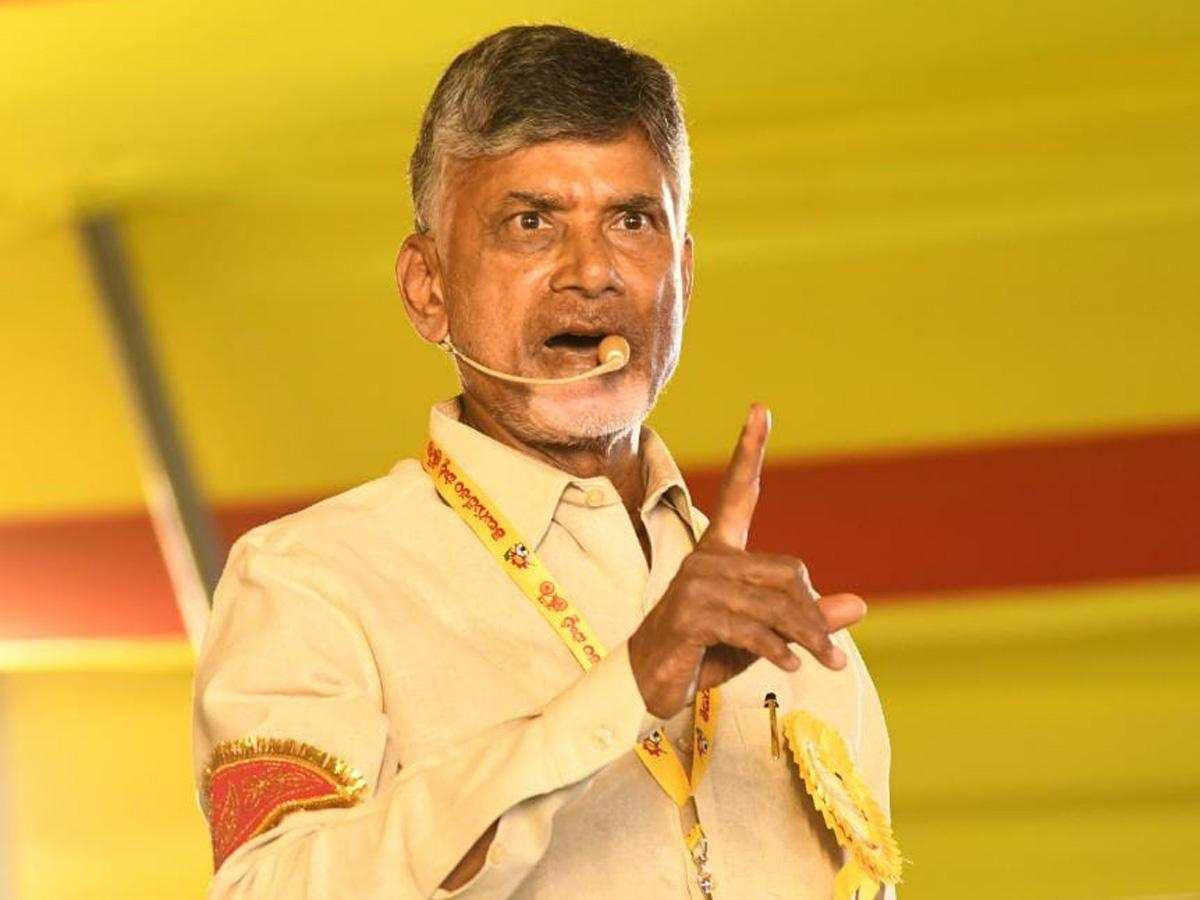
N. Chandrababu Naidu

Nara Chandrababu Naidu, commonly known as CBN, is an Indian politician who is currently serving as the 13th Chief Minister of Andhra Pradesh, currently in his fourth term. He holds the record of longest-serving Chief Minister in the political history of Telugu states. He is the national president of the Telugu Desam Party (TDP). NTR's third daughter, Bhuvaneswari, is married to Nara Chandrababu Naidu. He has a younger brother Nara Ramamurthy Naidu.

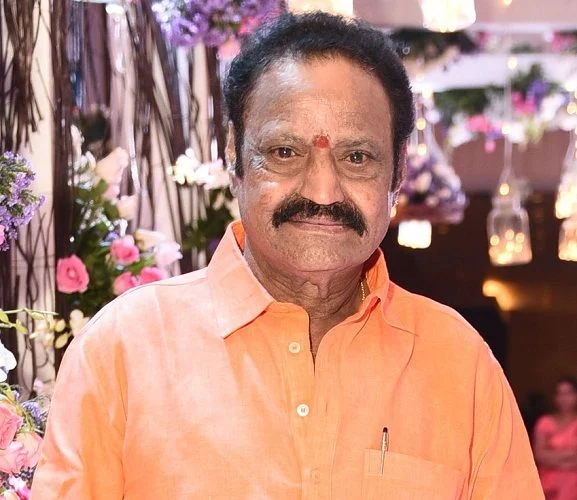
Nandamuri Harikrishna, Taraka Rama Rao's fourth son

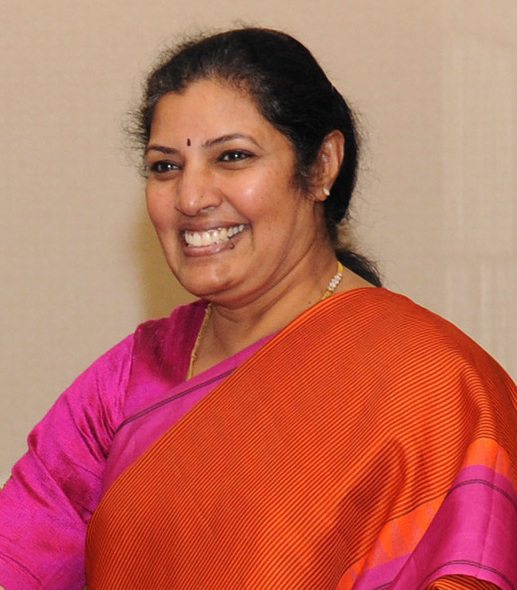
Daggubati Purandeswari, Taraka Rama Rao's second daughter

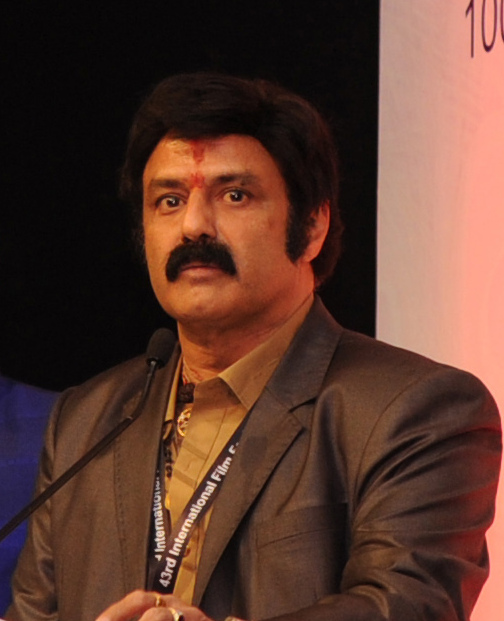
Nandamuri Balakrishna, Taraka Rama Rao's sixth son

NTR's fourth son, Nandamuri Harikrishna, was an actor-turned-politician elected to the Rajya Sabha, representing the TDP. NTR's fifth son Nandamuri Mohana Krishna is a cinematographer. NTR's sixth son, Nandamuri Balakrishna, has been one of the leading actors in Tollywood since the mid-1980s. Balakrishna contested 2014 and has been the elected member of the Andhra Pradesh Legislative Assembly from Hindupuram constituency since. Daggubati Purandeswari, is a politician, who has served as a Union Minister and is the current BJP Andhra Pradesh President.

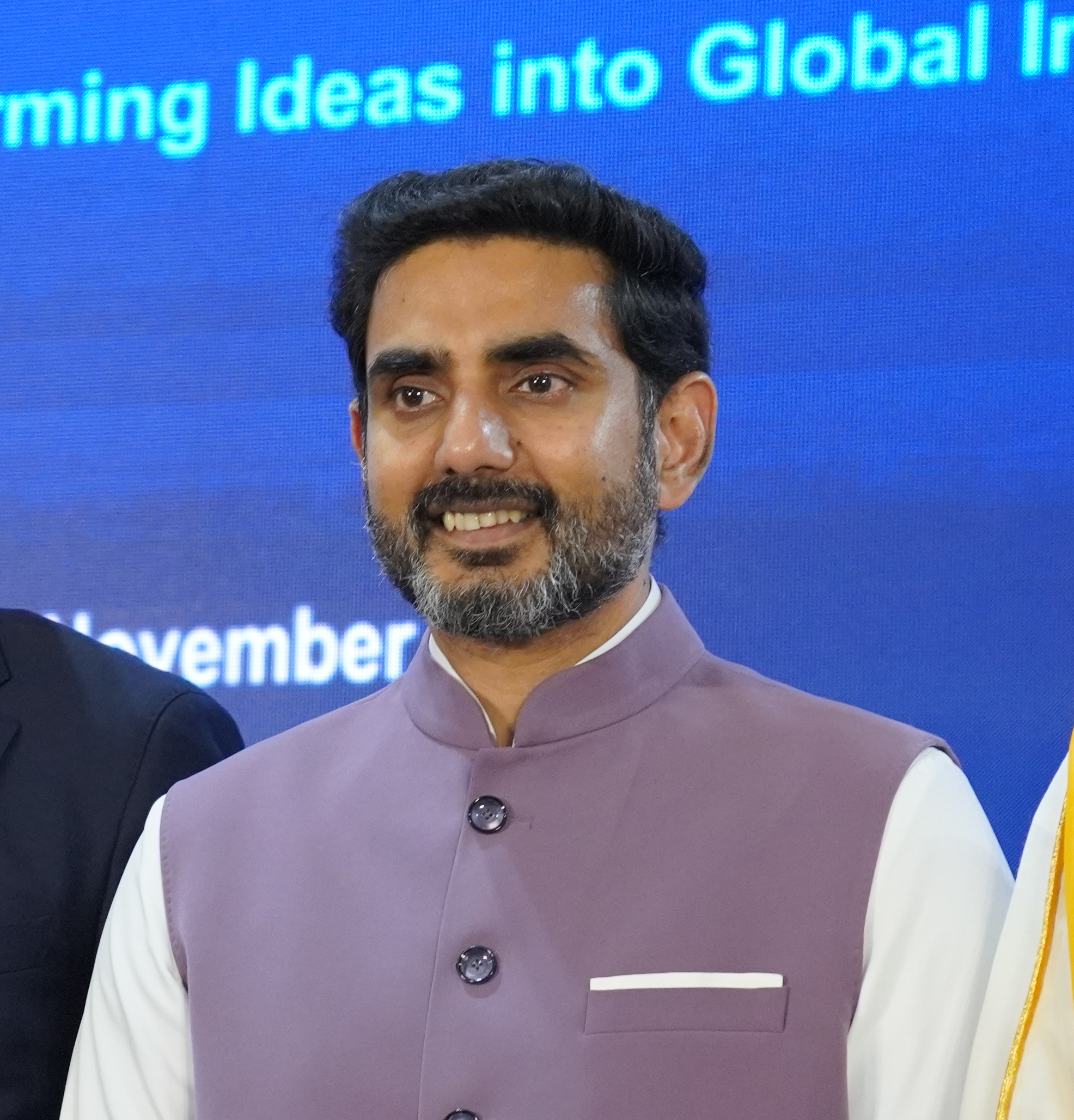
Nara Lokesh, Chandrababu Naidu's son

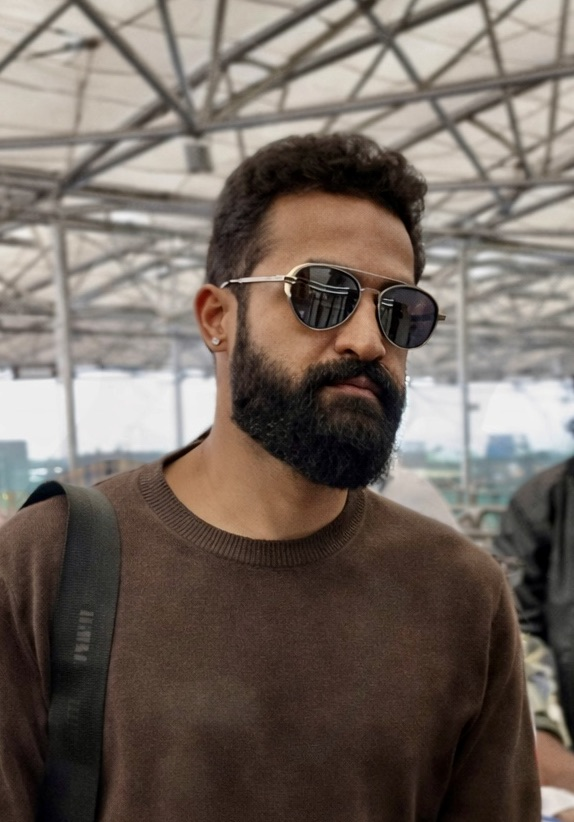
N. T. Rama Rao Jr., Harikrishna's youngest son

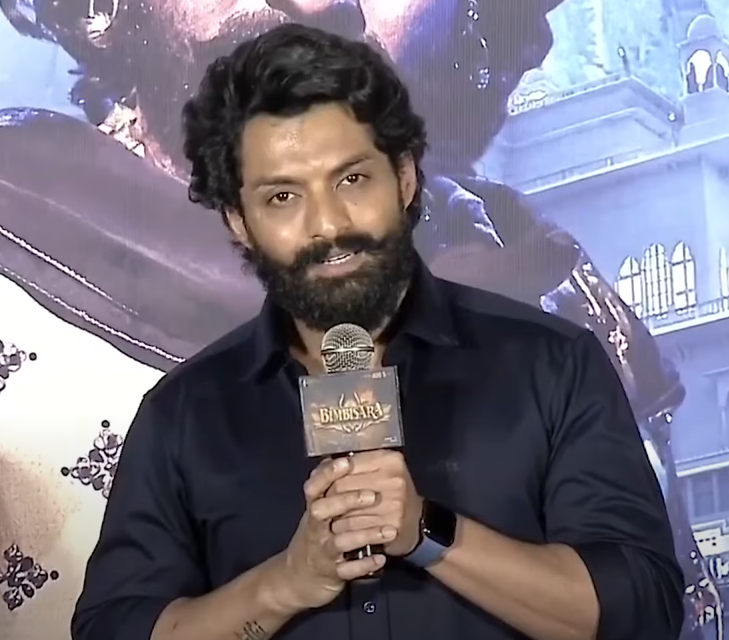
Nandamuri Kalyan Ram, Harikrishna's second son

Chandrababu Naidu's son Nara Lokesh is a politician serving as the member of the Andhra Pradesh Legislative Assembly from Mangalagiri since 2024. Harikrishna's sons Nandamuri Kalyan Ram and N. T. Rama Rao Jr. are also actors in the Telugu cinema, with the latter being one of the leading actors in Telugu cinema since the early-2000s. Chandrababu Naidu's younger brother Nara Ramamurthy Naidu's son Nara Rohit is an actor.

== See also ==
- NTR Gardens
- Akkineni–Daggubati family
- Konidela–Allu family
