= Kaliyuga Krishnudu =

- Theatrical release poster
- Directed by: K. Murali Mohana Rao
- Written by: Paruchuri Brothers (dialogues)
- Screenplay by: K. Murali Mohana Rao
- Story by: M. D. Sundar
- Produced by: A. K. V. Prasad; Chalapathi Rao
- Starring: Nandamuri Balakrishna; Radha
- Cinematography: Nandamuri Mohana Krishna
- Edited by: Narasimha Rao
- Music by: Chakravarthy
- Production company: Viswashanthi Enterprises
- Release date: 19 September 1986
- Running time: 125 minutes
- Country: India
- Language: Telugu

Kaliyuga Krishnudu (transl. Krishna of Kaliyuga) is a 1986 Indian Telugu-language action film, produced by Chalapathi Rao, A. K. V. Prasad in the banner of Viswashanthi Enterprises and directed by K. Murali Mohana Rao. Starring Nandamuri Balakrishna, Radha and music composed by Chakravarthy. The film was recorded as a Hit at the box office. It ran 100 days in 20 centres and is the 5th Hit in Balakrishna’s double hat trick of 1986.

== Plot ==
The film begins with a business magnate, Siddeswara Rao, a devious and direful person. Gayatri Devi, his sister, gets back from abroad with her husband Vasudeva Rao and seeks her share of the property, which he denies. Moreover, he brutally kills Vasudeva Rao and craftily penalizes Gayatri. However, she is pregnant at that time and gives birth to a baby boy in prison. So, Siddeswara Rao instructs his allegiant Sambaiah to eliminate the child too. So, he abducts him when a truck driver, Rangaiah, rescues and rears him as Mohana Krishna. Frightened, Sambaiah announces a kid's death when Siddeswara Rao backstabs him, and he escapes. In tandem, Siddeswara Rao ridicules Gayatri when she challenges him to wipe out him.

Years roll by, and Mohana Krishna grows up as a doughty who defies injustice. Unbeknownst, he becomes diehard to Siddeswara Rao, his mischievous son Ramesh, and snobby daughter Anuradha. Meanwhile, Gayatri Devi is released, acquires her share, and declares business warfare against her brother. Destiny makes Rangaiah Gayatri's driver, and she associates with Mohana Krishna. Here, they develop strange relations and, on the verge of collapsing, their adversary. Then, Anuradha conspires and apprehends Mohana Krishna under a trumped-up charge. Hence, he ripostes by marrying her in disguise. Soon after, Mohana Krishna reveals his identity. Consequently, Anuradha, infuriated, tries to kill Gayatri Devi when she learns about the devilish side of her father. Therefore, Anuradha reforms and unites with her husband.

After a while, Rangaiah identifies Sambaiah; it is hard to hold him, but he goes into the clutches of Siddeswara Rao. Discovering the actuality, Siddeswara Rao intrigues by goading Mohana Krishna with his mother through Sambaiah with a fairytale. Despite that, the truth comes forward, which conjoins Mohana Krishna & Gayatri Devi. Knowing it, begrudge Ramesh's moves for vengeance against Sambaiah. He tries to molest his daughter Lakshmi when, by mistake, Sambaiah kills her. At that juncture, Mohana Krishna plays the same old trick and indicts Ramesh. Thus, Siddeswara Rao breaks the bars and absconds his son. At last, Mohana Krishna ceases them. Finally, the movie ends on a happy note.

== Cast ==
- Nandamuri Balakrishna as Mohana Krishna
- Radha as Anuradha
- Rao Gopal Rao as Siddheshwara Rao
- Sharada as Gayatri Devi
- Allu Ramalingaiah as Kukuteswara Rao / Kuku
- Nutan Prasad as Rangaiah
- Gollapudi Maruthi Rao as Sambaiah
- Sudhakar as Ramesh
- Ranganath as Vasudeva Rao
- Sakshi Ranga Rao as Pakir
- Jaya Bhaskar as Police Inspector
- Jagga Rao
- K. K. Sarma as Someswara Rao
- Chidatala Appa Rao
- Potti Veeraiyah
- Dham
- Rama Prabha as Rangamma
- Madhuri (Tamil actress) as Lakshmi
- Anitha as Vijaya
- Kuyili as item number
- Jayamalini as item number
- Anuradha as item number

== Soundtrack ==
Kaliyuga Krishnudu

Film score by Chakravarthy
- Released: 1986
- Genre: Soundtrack
- Length: 21:27
- Label: LEO Audio
- Producer: Chakravarthy

Chakravarthy chronology
Desoddarakudu (1986)	Kaliyuga Krishnudu (1986)	Apoorva Sahodarudu (1986)

Music composed by Chakravarthy. Lyrics were written by Veturi. The music released on the LEO Audio Company.

S. No.	Song title	Singers	length
1	"Chuka Chukalaledi"	S. P. Balasubrahmanyam	4:18
2	"Bangaru Thotalo"	S. P. Balasubrahmanyam, S. Janaki	4:14
3	"Kongu Kongu Mudipaddaka"	S. P. Balasubrahmanyam, P. Susheela	4:07
4	"Ramba Ramba"	P. Susheela, S. Janaki	4:15
5	"Jabili Uttikote"	P. Susheela	4:33
