= NTR Gardens =

Urban park in Hyderabad, India

NTR
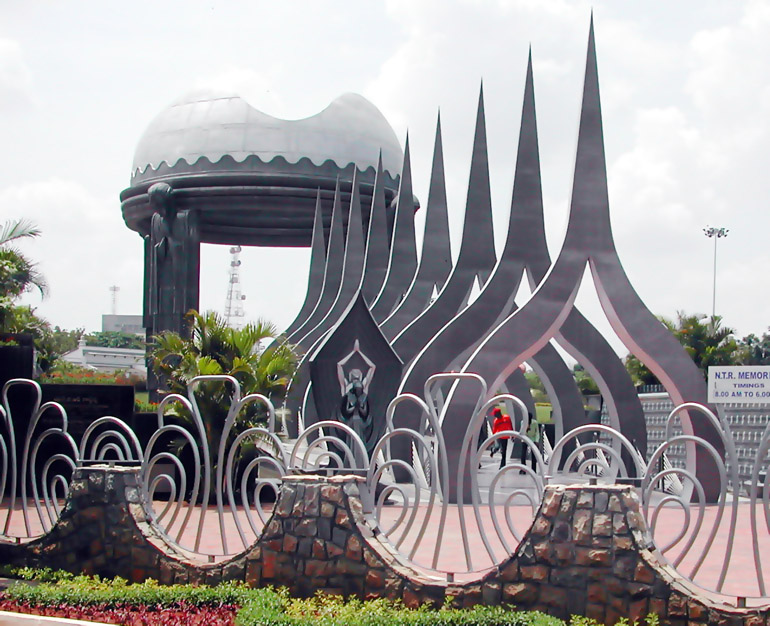
- N. T. Rama Rao's Memorial At NTR Gardens
- Interactive map of NTR
- Type: Urban park
- Location: Hussain Sagar, Hyderabad
- Coordinates: 17.410°N 78.4722°E
- Area: 22 ha (55 acres)
- Created: 15 December 2001
- Operator: Buddha Purnima Project Authority
- Visitors: 25,114
- Status: Open all year

NTR Gardens is a small public, urban park of 15 hectares (36 acres) adjacent to Hussain Sagar lake in Hyderabad, where earlier a thermal power station building stood until 1995. It is named after the former Chief minister of Andhra Pradesh, N. T. Rama Rao. Constructed in several phases since 1999, the area that is predominantly a park is geographically located in the centre of the city, and is close to other tourist attractions such as Birla Mandir, Necklace Road and Lumbini Park. It is maintained by the Buddha Purnima Project Authority of the Government of Telangana.

== History ==
=== Beginnings ===
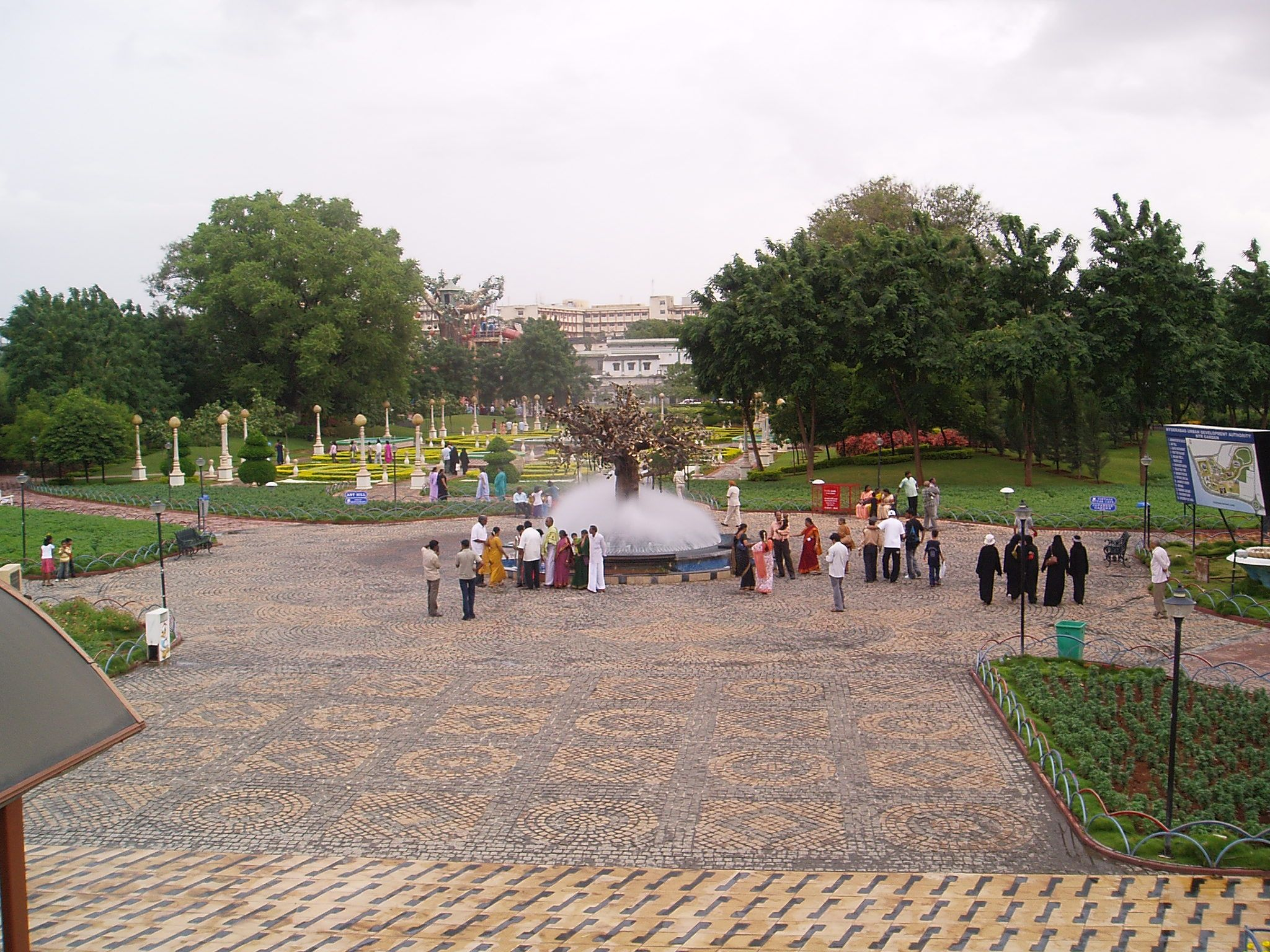
The NTR Gardens is among the gardens in the vicinity of Hussain Sagar lake serving as a recreation park.

The land for the garden was cleared in 1995 after demolishing Hussain Sagar Thermal Power Station. In 1999, a land of 2.0 hectares (5 acres) from a 22 hectares (55 acres) plot was utilised for erecting a memorial for N. T. Rama Rao, the former Chief Minister of unbifurcated Andhra Pradesh. It was inaugurated by N. Chandrababu Naidu. It was planned to further expand this area, which has since been referred to as NTR Gardens, by constructing a museum about N. T. Rama Rao. This memorial was a part of the Buddha Purnima Project that was being handled by Hyderabad Urban Development Authority (HUDA) for the beautification and development of the Hussain Sagar lake and its surroundings as a major tourist attraction.

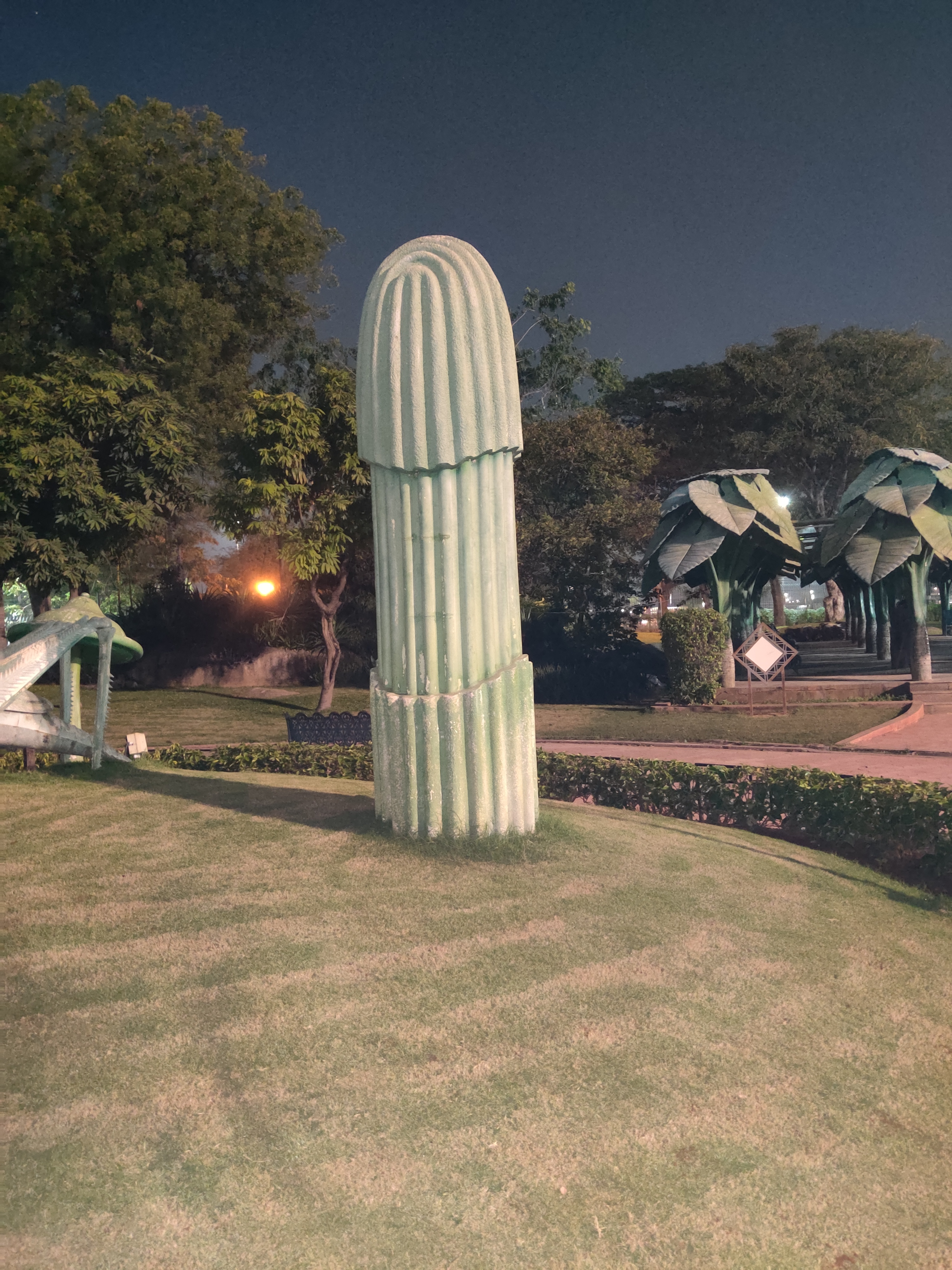

In 2000, the Government of Andhra Pradesh expressed its plans to develop this area with several projects such the NTR Gardens itself, a rock garden and an IMAX theatre. A few days later, a government official firstly said that the rock garden will be taken up by Dubai-based NRIs at a cost of ₹270 million (equivalent to ₹1.2 billion or US$13 million in 2026). Secondly the IMAX theatre project, which was said to cost ₹520 million (equivalent to ₹2.3 billion or US$25 million in 2026) was allotted to a private firm. Both these projects were to be executed in the same 22-hectare (55-acre) plot which housed the memorial.

=== Controversy ===
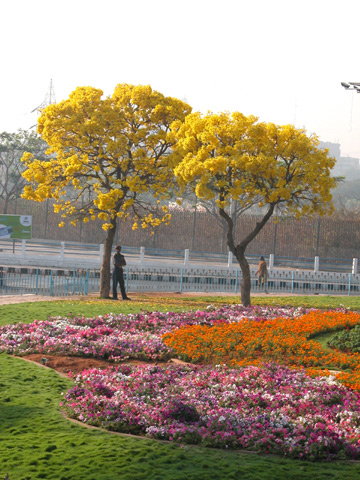
Blooming flowers at the gardens.

Upon the beginning of work at these gardens in January 2000, a petition by two non-profit organisations sought an immediate halt of construction activity at the gardens. They contended that regulations showed the area around the lake as a recreation zone which must be kept away from all constructions for commercial or residential purposes. Since they claimed that these proposed projects violated all these, they sought a public hearing and an environment impact assessment before allowing these projects to continue. Accordingly, the local apex court instructed the authorities to stop the construction until further orders.

A media report suggested that according to the 1980 HUDA Master Plan, the area where the NTR Gardens are located originally was a water body, but a gazetted notification in 1994 could allow such construction activities.

=== Present ===
In 2001, the extensive work at 14 hectares (34 acres) of gardens was completed at a cost of ₹400 million (equivalent to ₹1.7 billion or US$19 million in 2026). Besides a variety of plants, the gardens also house a souvenir complex, a visitors train, restaurants and a waterfall.

== See also ==
- NTR Trust
