= Anasuyamma Gari Alludu =

1986 film by A. Kodandarami Reddy

- Theatrical release poster
- Directed by: A. Kodandarami Reddy
- Written by: Paruchuri Brothers (story / dialogues)
- Screenplay by: A. Kodandarami Reddy
- Produced by: Nandamuri Harikrishna
- Starring: Nandamuri Balakrishna; Bhanupriya; Sharada
- Cinematography: Nandamuri Mohana Krishna
- Edited by: Vemuri Ravi
- Music by: Chakravarthy
- Production company: Ramakrishna Cine Studios
- Release date: 2 July 1986
- Running time: 143 minutes
- Country: India
- Language: Telugu

Anasuyamma Gari Alludu (transl. Anasuyamma's Son-in-law) is a 1986 Indian Telugu-language comedy film, produced by Nandamuri Harikrishna under the Ramakrishna Cine Studios banner and directed by A. Kodandarami Reddy. It stars Nandamuri Balakrishna, Bhanupriya, Sharada and music composed by Chakravarthy. The film was remade in Tamil as Vairagyam starring Prabhu.

== Cast ==
- Nandamuri Balakrishna as Harikrishna
- Bhanupriya as Rukmini
- Sharada as Anasuyamma
- Rao Gopal Rao as Lokeswara Rao
- Jaggayya as Anasuyamma's husband
- Nutan Prasad as Varahalu
- Chalapathi Rao as Inspector
- Ramji as Ashok Kumar
- Hema Sundar as Srikanth
- Ramana Reddy as Long Long Ago Nukalu
- Chitti Babu as Driver
- Chidatala Appa Rao
- Annapurna as Parvatamma
- Rama Prabha as Achalamma
- Dubbing Janaki as Lokeswara Rao's wife

== Soundtrack ==
Anasuyamma Gari Alludu

Film score by Chakravarthy
- Released: 1986
- Genre: Soundtrack
- Length: 21:40
- Label: AVM Audio
- Producer: Chakravarthy

Chakravarthy chronology
Apoorva Sahodarudu (1986)	Anasuyamma Gari Alludu (1986)	Desoddarakudu (1986)

Music composed by Chakravarthy. Lyrics were written by Veturi. Music released on AVM Audio Company.

S. No.	Song title	Singers	length
1	"Atta Anasuyamma"	S. P. Balasubrahmanyam	4:22
2	"Bhama Bhama"	S. P. Balasubrahmanyam, Ramola	4:26
3	"Inka Muddula"	S. P. Balasubrahmanyam, P. Susheela	4:14
4	"Taluku Tamboolamista"	S. P. Balasubrahmanyam, P. Susheela	4:37
5	"Tolireyi"	S. P. Balasubrahmanyam, P. Susheela	4:02

== Other ==
- VCDs and DVDs on - Universal Videos, SHALIMAR Video Company, Hyderabad
