= Ram Raheem =

- Theatrical release poster
- Directed by: B. A. Subba Rao
- Written by: Samudrala Jr (dialogues)
- Screenplay by: B. A. Subba Rao
- Story by: Prasad
- Produced by: K. R. V. Prasad Rao
- Starring: Nandamuri Balakrishna; Nandamuri Harikrishna
- Cinematography: P. Ellappa
- Edited by: K. A. Martand
- Music by: S. Rajeswara Rao
- Production company: Raja Lakshmi Combines
- Release date: 12 December 1974
- Running time: 110 minutes
- Country: India
- Language: Telugu

Ram Raheem is a 1974 Indian Telugu-language drama film, produced by K. R. V. Prasad Rao under the Raja Lakshmi Combines banner and directed by B. A. Subba Rao. It stars Nandamuri Balakrishna and Nandamuri Harikrishna with music composed by S. Rajeswara Rao.

== Cast ==
- Nandamuri Balakrishna as Ram
- Nandamuri Harikrishna as Raheem
- Chandra Mohan as Syam
- Relangi as Syam's father
- Dhulipala as Sivaram
- Satyanarayana as Rajayya
- Allu Ramalingaiyah as teacher
- Prabhakar Reddy as Inspector Khan
- Thyagaraju as Kabuliwala
- Sakshi Ranga Rao as a clerk
- Ch. Krishna Murthy as Jagan Mohan Rao
- Chitti Babu
- Sowcar Janaki as Lakshmi
- Roja Ramani as Radha
- Nirmalamma as Ram's grandmother

== Soundtrack ==
Ram Raheem

Film score by S. Rajeswara Rao
- Released: 1974
- Genre: Soundtrack
- Length: 19:34
- Label: EMI Columbia
- Producer: S. Rajeswara Rao

Music composed by S. Rajeswara Rao. Music released on EMI Columbia Audio Company.

S. No.	Song title	Lyrics	Singers	length
1	"Nenu Kathula Rathayahnule"	Dasaradhi	Mohammed Rafi, Madhavapeddi Ramesh	3:00
2	"Kalale Kannanu"	Dasaradhi	P. Susheela	3:43
3	"Egire Gaali Pataaniki"	C. Narayana Reddy	S. P. Balasubrahmanyam, P. Susheela	3:17
4	"Prapancha Mantha Jhutta"	Samudrala Jr.	S. P. Balasubrahmanyam	3:10
5	"Rickshaw Tokkaaliraa"	Kosaraju	Madhavapeddi Ramesh	3:24
6	"Yunaani Hakin Hum"	Dasaradhi	Mohammed Rafi, Madhavapeddi Ramesh	3:00
