= Nimmakuru =

- Village
- Interactive map of Nimmakuru
- Location in Andhra Pradesh, India
- Coordinates: 16.2703°N 80.9967°E
- Country: India
- State: Andhra Pradesh
- District: Krishna district

Area
  - Total: 3.89 km^{2} (1.50 sq mi)

Population (2011)
  - Total: 1,000
  - Density: 260/km^{2} (670/sq mi)

Languages
  - Official: Telugu
- Time zone: UTC+5:30 (IST)
- Telephone code: +91-(0)8674
- Vehicle registration: AP-16

Nimmakuru is a village in Krishna district of the Indian state of Andhra Pradesh. It is located in Pamarru mandal of Gudivada revenue division. It is the birth place of actor and former Chief minister of Andhra Pradesh N. T. Rama Rao; actor and politician Nandamuri Harikrishna & Nandamuri Balakrishna, and actor Rajendra Prasad.

== Notables ==
- N.T.Rama Rao
- Gadde Rajendra Prasad
