= Hussain Sagar Thermal Power Station =

India's First Thermal Power Station

- Hussain Sagar Thermal Power Station
- Country: India
- Location: Hyderabad, Telangana, India
- Status: demolished in 1995
- Commission date: 1920
- Decommission date: 1992
- Operator: Hyderabad State Electricity Department

Thermal power station
- Primary fuel: Coal

Power generation
- Nameplate capacity: 22.5 MW

Hussain Sagar Thermal Power Station was a historic thermal power plant that was located in Hyderabad, Telangana on the banks of Hussain Sagar. It was one of India's first thermal power stations, opened in 1920 by the erstwhile seventh Nizam of Hyderabad. The power plant replaced the diesel generators of Hyderabad State Electricity Department that had been used in a limited way since 1910 to supply electricity to houses and light the streetlights.

== History ==
Hussain Sagar Thermal Power Station was built in 1920 during the time of the Seventh Nizam, Mir Osman Ali Khan.

== Plant ==
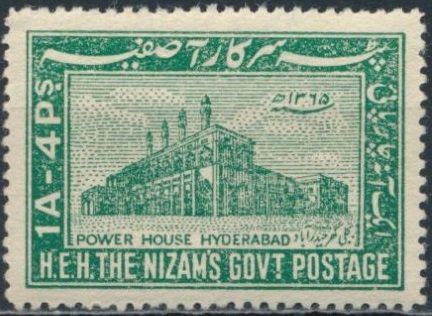
The power station depicted on a 1947 Hyderabad State stamp

The power plant was built in 1920 at Mint Compound, and was operated by Hyderabad State Electricity Department of the erstwhile Hyderabad State to supply power to the twin cities of Hyderabad and Secunderabad. Equipment was procured from English Electric and Westinghouse Electric. The power plant comprised four units. The generation was 22.5 MW on a consumption of about 200 tons of coal per day. The plant was fully operational until 1972 when two units were shut down. In 1984, for practical reasons production mostly ended. However, until 1992 the plant was intermittently used. The structure was demolished in 1995.

== Location ==
Hussain Sagar Thermal Power Station was located where NTR Gardens and Prasad's IMAX exist today. The power plant was demolished in 1995 to build the gardens.

== See also ==
- Category:Establishments in Hyderabad State
