= Heritage Foods =

Indian food and agriculture company pvt ltd

Heritage Foods Limited
- Formerly: Heritage Foods (India) Limited (1992–2013)
- Type: Public
- Traded as: NSE: HERITGFOOD; BSE: 519552
- Industry: Dairy and agribusiness
- Founded: 5 June 1992; 34 years ago
- Founder: Nara Chandrababu Naidu
- Headquarters: Hyderabad, Telangana, India
- Key people: Nara Brahmani (Executive Director); Sambasiva Rao (President)
- Revenue: ▲₹3,805 crore (US$400 million) (2024)
- Net income: ▲₹113 crore (US$12 million) (2024)
- Owner: Nara family
- Number of employees: 3000+
- Website: www.heritagefoods.in

Heritage Foods Limited is an Indian private sector dairy enterprise, operating primarily in South India. It has its headquarters in Hyderabad, India.

== History ==
The Heritage Group was founded in 1992 by Telugu Desam Party chief and current Chief Minister of Andhra Pradesh, Nara Chandrababu Naidu, with three-business divisions viz., dairy, retail and agri under Heritage Foods Limited (HFL), one infrastructure subsidiary – Heritage Infra Developers Limited and other associate companies viz., Heritage Finlease Limited, Heritage International Limited and Heritage Agro Marine Private Limited.

In 1994, HFL went public with an initial public offering, which was oversubscribed 54 times. Its shares are listed on BSE and NSE.

== Products ==
Heritage's products include milk, curd, ice cream, buttermilk, flavored milk, dairy whitener, skim milk powder, along with fruits, vegetables, bakery products and private label products like cereals, pulses, staples, and spices.
