= Apoorva Sahodarulu =

1986 Indian film by K. Raghavendra Rao

- Theatrical release poster
- Directed by: K. Raghavendra Rao
- Written by: Satyanand (dialogues)
- Screenplay by: K. Raghavendra Rao
- Story by: Sunil Varma
- Produced by: K. Krishna Mohana Rao
- Starring: Nandamuri Balakrishna; Vijayashanti; Bhanupriya
- Cinematography: K. S. Prakash
- Edited by: Kotagiri Venkateswara Rao
- Music by: Chakravarthy
- Production company: R. K. Associates
- Release date: 9 October 1986
- Running time: 152 mins
- Country: India
- Language: Telugu

Apoorva Sahodarulu (transl. Unique Brothers) is a 1986 Indian Telugu-language action film, produced by K. Krishna Mohana Rao under the R. K. Associates banner and directed by K. Raghavendra Rao. It stars Nandamuri Balakrishna, Vijayashanti, Bhanupriya and the music was composed by Chakravarthy. This is the first time Nandamuri Balakrishna plays a dual role.

== Plot ==
The film begins in a royal dynasty where Zamindar Narendra Varma notabilities Prakasam, a freedom fighter, and bestows him his prestigious land for providing shelter to the families of the combatants. Consequently, the public praises the kind nature of Narendra Varma and his wife Malini, but the childlessness perturbs the two. Bangaru Raju & Varahalu, Narendra Varma's vicious brothers-in-law, are waiting for a shot to usurp his wealth. Alongside, Narendra Varma knits a penniless Purna hiding his identity, who is pregnant. Being conscious of it, Bangaru Raju acts together and puts fire on Purna's house when she is assumed dead. By and by, Malini also conceives after delivery the evils prey on the newborn baby. It entails Narendra Varma being devastated. During that plight, a nurse endorses him as a kid from twins of a broken woman, non-else Purna. Narendra Varma is unbeknownst near his own. Adjacently, Bangaru Raju's men view Purna alive and try to kill her with the child. Yet, she escapes, her child is misplaced and is secured & reared by the Prakasam couple. The sibling is named Ramu & Arun Kumar, respectively. Later, Bangaru Raju schemes to abduct Narendra Varma for his secretly hidden heritage treasure and declares him as departed, and before long, Malini also passes away.

Years roll by, and Arun Kumar grows up as fearless with pride & sovereignty but genial and spends his life frolicking. Bangaru Raju & Varahalu make numerous attempts to assassinate him from childhood but in vain. Ramu, a courageous, grows up in a colony, Bharat Nagar of Narendra Varma, where he holds a sterling reputation for succoring others. Arun appoints a benevolent Swapna as secretary, the daughter of the same nurse who split the twins. From there, he changes, handles his responsibilities, and endears her, which begrudges the brutal. Besides, Bangaru Raju makes a secret pathway in the forest for their smuggling activities without any hindrance. So, they subject stockade to hundreds of me to inhumane conditions and slave them. Narendra Varma is also one of them. Once, Ramu squabbles with a vainglory Roja, the daughter of Babu Rao, an agent of Bangaru Raju. After a while, they fell in love, and considering it, Babu Rao colluded with Bangaru Raju to squat the colony. Initially, Arun accepted the proposal but backed up Swapna's suggestions. Hence, the blackguards destroy the colony with the cutesiest horses of Arun, which Ramu catches hold of. Shortly, the knaves kill the horses and incriminate the colony men. Then, enraged, Arun locks & tortures Prakasam. Timely, Ramu lands, and the battle erupts between brethren, ending with Ramu's apprehension.

Now, Bangaru Raju cages the colony to complete his roadway by homicide Prakasam. If there is anything wrong with it, Ramu absconds from prison. Concurrently, Bangaru Raju & Varahalu cabal to poison Arun but are saved by a stroke of luck when they accuse Swapna, which he too believes and necks her out. Additionally, frightened Babu Rao shifts to the palace, where Roja is startled to view Arun exactly as Ramu. In the interim, the malcretives capture Purna too when she comes across Narendra Varma. Spotting it, Bangaru Raju threatens him for concealed wealth, showing danger to Purna. Here, Ramu gets to rescues and skips with Purna. Fortunately, he sets foot in Swapna's residence, where Prakasham's wife Shantamma also huts following his death. Thus, the reality shows when Ramu reenters the forest to protect the remaining, but miscreants backstab him. Simultaneously, Roja breaks the diabolic shades of his uncles before Arun and Swapna as non-guilty. Immediately, he proceeds to Swapna, where he learns about his actual life and embraces his mother, Purna. At that point, the crooks' tactics and jails Arun as Ramu. Meanwhile, Ramu breaks the death, forms a play with the aid of Swapna & Roja, and pretends as if he mingled with swindlers. Next, he reaches his father, Narendra Varma, by counterfeiting them when he spells the location of hidden riches. The devils overhear their conversation, net them, and move for the secret fortune. During that plight, Arun breaks free and bails them out. At last, the unique brothers cease the baddies and shield the treasure. Finally, the movie ends on a happy note with the marriage of Arun to Swapna & Ramu to Roja.

== Cast ==
- Nandamuri Balakrishna as (dual role)
  - Ramu
  - Arun Kumar
- Vijayashanti as Swapna (Voice Dubbed by Durga)
- Bhanupriya as Roja
- Rao Gopal Rao as Bangarraju
- Allu Rama Lingaiah as Appala Swami
- Nutan Prasad as Babu Rao
- Rallapalli as Varahala Raju
- Ranganath as Raja Narendra Varma
- Kanta Rao as Prakasham
- Rajesh as Vigyana Prasad
- Suthi Velu as Bose Babu
- Chalapathi Rao as Naroora / Nara Roopa Rakshasudu
- Narra Venkateswara Rao as Police Inspector
- Ch. Krishna Murthy as Inspector
- KK Sarma as Driver
- Chitti Babu as Musician
- Chidatala Appa Rao as Musician
- Annapoorna as Purna
- Dubbing Janaki as Swapna's mother
- Mahija as Dr. Sumati
- Shubha as Malini
- Nirmalamma as Shantamma

== Soundtrack ==
Apoorva Sahodarulu

Film score by Chakravarthy
- Released: 1986
- Genre: Soundtrack
- Length: 24:46
- Label: AVM Audio
- Producer: Chakravarthy

Chakravarthy chronology
Anasuyamma Gari Alludu (1986)	Apoorva Sahodarulu (1986)	Desoddarakudu (1986)

Music was composed by Chakravarthy, and lyrics were written by Veturi. Music was released on AVM Audio Company.

S.No	Song title	Singers	length
1	"My Dear Rambha"	S. P. Balasubrahmanyam, S. Janaki, P. Susheela	5:09
2	"Swapna Priya Swapna"	S. P. Balasubrahmanyam, S. Janaki	5:42
3	"Dongava Dochuko"	S. P. Balasubrahmanyam, P. Susheela	4:29
4	"Appalamma Aadite"	S. P. Balasubrahmanyam, S. Janaki	4:56
5	"Piduganti Pillodu"	S. P. Balasubrahmanyam, P. Susheela	4:30
