= NTR Trust =

Not for profit organization

- Formation: 1997
- Legal status: Active
- Location: Hyderabad, Telangana
- Official language: Telugu; English; Hindi
- Managing Trustee: N. Bhuvaneswari
- Trustees: N.Brahmani; Krishnaiah IAS(Retd.)
- CEO: K.Rajendra Kumar IPS (Retd.)
- COO: Gopi Adusupalle
- Website: ntrtrust.org

NTR Trust, also known as NTR Memorial Trust, is a not-for-profit Indian social welfare organization headquartered in Hyderabad, Telangana, India. It was founded in 1997 by Nara Chandrababu Naidu, for charitable and social welfare purposes. The organization was named after Indian matinee idol and politician N. T. Rama Rao.

The Trust primarily focuses on healthcare, education, and disaster response and relief. Their charitable initiatives include operating blood banks (like the NTR Memorial Trust Blood Centre), providing free education through schools and coaching centers, organizing medical camps, and offering skill development and livelihood programs, particularly aimed at women's empowerment.

== History ==
NTR Trust was established in 1997, in the same year the Andhra Pradesh government headed by N. Chandrababu Naidu allocated land for the organization.

In 2011 the organization announced that they would set up safe drinking water plants for the poor people who don't have easy access to safe drinking water. Earlier they had set up NTR Sujala Pathakam project that aimed at providing safe drinking water to 50,000 people.

In 2014, they organized a job-fair (job mela) at NTR Trust Bhavan, Hyderabad, where 600 youths participated.

In June 2014 Nara Bhuvaneswari, wife of N. Chandrababu Naidu, took charge of NTR Trust Bhavan, currently she is a trustee of the organization.

In 2015 the organization declared about establishing a college in Gandipet.

== Services ==
NTR Trust provides services such as free education to poor children and youth, healthcare, youth empowerment, and Disaster Response & Relief. It also runs a Blood Bank in Hyderabad, Visakhapatnam and Tirupati (NABH accredited) In November 2015, NTR trust announced that they would offer free coaching to poor students. NTR Sujala Scheme provides clean drinking water to 18 lakhs people in Telangana and Andhra Pradesh.

Under the support of Nara Brahmani, the daughter-in-law of Chandrababu Naidu, Chief Minister of Andhra Pradesh as of 2016, NTR Memorial Trust in December 2015, started training the first batch of job aspirant graduate and post-graduate students. About 900 applicants they are training 130 candidates who have passed a level-II exam, free of cost for the competitive exams. A blood donation drive will be organized on 18 January 2016, 20th death anniversary of the former chief minister of the Andhra Pradesh, N.T.Rama Rao by the organization. It was reported that in more than 200 places, blood donation camps will be held.

== Controversies ==
In 1997 when land for NTR trust was being allocated, the legislature of Andhra Pradesh witnessed noisy scenes. Indian National Congress alleged that Telugu Desam Party and N. Chandrababu Naidu were attempting to promote their political party through this organization.

== See also ==
- Basavatarakam Indo American Cancer Hospital
