= Janani Janmabhoomi =

- Theatrical release poster
- Directed by: K. Viswanath
- Written by: D. V. Narasa Raju (dialogues)
- Screenplay by: K. Viswanath
- Story by: K. Viswanath
- Produced by: K. Kesava Rao
- Starring: Nandamuri Balakrishna; Sumalatha; Satyanarayana; Sharada
- Cinematography: Kasthuri
- Edited by: G. G. Krishna Rao
- Music by: K. V. Mahadevan
- Production company: Sri Bramharambika Films
- Release date: 27 July 1984
- Running time: 148 minutes
- Country: India
- Language: Telugu

Janani Janmabhoomi (transl. Mother and The Motherland) is a 1984 Telugu-language philosophical film produced by K. Kesava Rao under the Sri Bramharambika Films banner and directed by K. Viswanath. It stars Nandamuri Balakrishna, Sumalatha, Satyanarayana, Sharada and music composed by K. V. Mahadevan.

== Cast ==
- Nandamuri Balakrishna as Ramesh
- Subhalekha Sudhakar as Suresh
- Rajyalakshmi as Satyavathi
- Sharada as Kachyayani
- Satyanarayana as Dhanjaya Rao
- Sumalatha as Padmini "Pammy"
- P. J. Sarma as Jaganath Rao
- Sakshi Ranga Rao as Post Master Govindaiah
- Gokina Rama Rao as Abbaiah Naidu
- Bheemeswara Rao as Dhanjaya Rao's Partner
- Potti Prasad as Driver
- Malladi as Musalaiah
- Jit Mohan Mitra as Kallukottu Owner
- Dham as Avataram
- Rama Prabha as Pammy's mother
- Dubbing Janaki as Nurse

== Soundtrack ==
Janani Janmabhoomi

Film score by K. V. Mahadevan
- Released: 1984
- Genre: Soundtrack
- Length: 21:19
- Label: AVM Audio
- Producer: K. V. Mahadevan

K. V. Mahadevan chronology
| Abhimanyudu (1984) | Janani Janmabhoomi (1984) | Mangammagari Manavadu (1984) |

Music composed by K. V. Mahadevan was released on Supreme Music. Lyrics were written by Veturi and Sirivennela Seetharama Sastry. Sastry was credited as CH. Seetharama Sastry (Bharani) in this film.

Track list
| No. | Title | Lyrics | Singer(s) | Length |
|---|---|---|---|---|
| 1. | "Tadisina Andaalalo" | Veturi | S. P. Balasubrahmanyam, S. Janaki | 3:54 |
| 2. | "Ghallu Ghalluna" | Veturi | S. P. Balasubrahmanyam, S. Janaki | 4:27 |
| 3. | "Sariganga Taanaalu" | Veturi | S. P. Balasubrahmanyam, S. P. Sailaja | 3:55 |
| 4. | "Thuule Thuule Thuulenamma" | Veturi | S. P. Balasubrahmanyam, P. Susheela | 4:18 |
| 5. | "Paluku Thenela Thalli" | Veturi | S. P. Balasubrahmanyam, P. Susheela | 2:25 |
| 6. | "Rasavahini Swaagatham (Gangaavatharanam)" | CH. Seetharama Sastry (Bharani) | Sai Geetha, Sai Kiran | 2:20 |
| Total length: | | | | 21:19 |
