= Tatamma Kala =

- Theatrical release poster
- Directed by: N. T. Rama Rao
- Written by: D. V. Narasa Raju (dialogues)
- Screenplay by: N. T. Rama Rao
- Story by: N. T. Rama Rao
- Produced by: N. T. Rama Rao
- Starring: N. T. Rama Rao; Bhanumathi Ramakrishna; Nandamuri Balakrishna
- Cinematography: J. Satyanarayana
- Edited by: G. D. Joshi
- Music by: S. Rajeswara Rao
- Production company: Ramakrishna Cine Studios
- Release date: 30 August 1974
- Running time: 158 minutes
- Country: India
- Language: Telugu

Tatamma Kala (transl. Great-Grandmother's Dream) is a 1974 Telugu-language drama film, produced and directed by N. T. Rama Rao under his Ramakrishna Cine Studios banner. The film stars N. T. Rama Rao, Bhanumathi Ramakrishna and debutant Nandamuri Balakrishna and has music composed by S. Rajeswara Rao.

== Cast ==
- N. T. Rama Rao as Ramaiah and his grandfather Musaliah (dual role)
- Bhanumathi Ramakrishna as Ravamma
- Nandamuri Balakrishna as Balakrishna
- Nandamuri Harikrishna as Venkatesam
- Ramana Reddy as John
- Raja Babu as Hare Ram
- Mada as Bhusaiah
- P. J. Sarma as Venkaiah
- Chalapathi Rao
- Bhima Raju as Ratnam
- Balakrishna
- Jaya Bhaskar
- Kanchana as Seeta
- Roja Ramani as Rama
- Vijayalalitha as Mala
- Subha as Saru
- K. Hemantha Kumar as Jr Ramaiah

== Soundtrack ==
Tatamma Kala

Film score by S. Rajeswara Rao
- Released: 1974
- Genre: Soundtrack
- Length: 38:29
- Label: EMI Columbia
- Producer: S. Rajeswara Rao

Music composed by S. Rajeswara Rao. Music released on EMI Columbia Audio Company.

S. No.	Song title	Lyrics	Singers	length
1	"Evaranukunnaru"	Kosaraju	Bhanumathi Ramakrishna	3:03
2	"Ayyalali Muddulayyalali"	Kosaraju	Bhanumathi Ramakrishna	4:02
3	"Emandi Vadinagaru"	Kosaraju	L. R. Eswari	3:13
4	"Korameesam Kurroda"	Kosaraju	Ghantasala, Bhanumathi Ramakrishna	5:38
5	"Sanagapoola"	Kosaraju	Ghantasala	4:26
6	"Pandavulu Pandavulu"	Kosaraju	S. P. Balasubrahmanyam, Madhavapeddi Satyam, Kovela Shantha	4:17
7	"Sye Annanura"	C. Narayana Reddy	P. Susheela	3:30
8	"Ye Manishi"	C. Narayana Reddy	S. P. Balasubrahmanyam	5:30
9	"Taaru Roadlape"	C. Narayana Reddy	Madhavapeddi Ramesh	4:50

== Awards ==
- Nandi Award for Best Story Writer - N. T. Rama Rao (1974)
