= Nandamuri Harikrishna =

Indian actor, film producer and politician

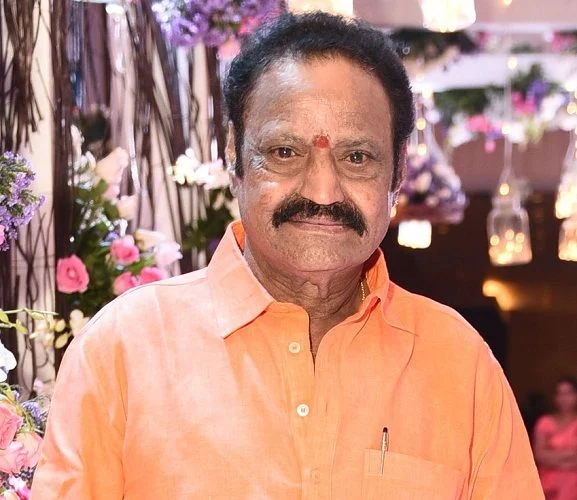

Member of Parliament, Rajya Sabha
- In office 10 April 2008 – 22 August 2013
- Succeeded by: Thota Seetharama Lakshmi
- Constituency: United Andhra Pradesh

Member of the Legislative Assembly United Andhra Pradesh
- In office 12 May 1996 – 10 October 1999
- Preceded by: N. T. Rama Rao
- Succeeded by: C. C. Venkataramudu
- Constituency: Hindupuram

Personal details
- Born: 2 September 1956 Nimmakuru, Andhra State (now in Andhra), India
- Died: 29 August 2018 (aged 61) Narketpally, Telangana, India
- Cause of death: Car accident
- Party: Telugu Desam Party
- Other political affiliations: Anna Telugu Desam Party
- Spouses: Lakshmi Kumari (m. 1973); Shalini (m. 1981)
- Children: 4; including: Kalyan Ram; N. T. Rama Rao Jr.
- Parent: N. T. Rama Rao (father) Nandamuri Basavatarakam (mother)
- Relatives: See Nandamuri–Nara family
- Occupation: Actor; Film producer; Politician

Nandamuri Harikrishna (2 September 1956 – 29 August 2018) was an Indian politician, actor, and film producer. He served as the Member of Parliament in the Rajya Sabha, the upper house the Indian Parliament representing the Indian state of Andhra Pradesh from 2008 to 2013 and a member of the Andhra Pradesh Legislative Assembly from 1996 to 1999. His film works were predominantly in Telugu cinema. Harikrishna was the fourth son of actor and former chief minister of Andhra Pradesh, N. T. Rama Rao. His sons N. T. Rama Rao Jr. and Nandamuri Kalyan Ram are actors and daughter Nandamuri Venkata Suhasini is a politician. He is also the brother of the famous Telugu actor and politician Nandamuri Balakrishna also called Balayya.

== Early life ==
Harikrishna was born on 2 September 1956 in Nimmakuru village of Krishna district in present-day Andhra Pradesh to N. T. Rama Rao and Basava Ramatarakam as their 4th son. He has eleven siblings: seven brothers and four sisters.

== Acting career ==
Harikrishna made his acting debut in 1964 as a child artist in Sri Krishnavataram, in which he played Krishna. It was directed by Kamalakara Kameshwara Rao. He then starred in Thalla? Pellama? (1970), followed by Tatamma Kala (1974), Ram Raheem (1974), and Daana Veera Soora Karna (1977). After a long sabbatical and political stint, he starred as a character actor in works such as Sri Ramulayya (1998), followed by a full-length role alongside Nagarjuna in Seetharama Raju (1999), Lahiri Lahiri Lahirilo (2002), and Seetayya (2003). In 2002, he received Nandi Award for Best Character Actor for his work in Lahiri Lahiri Lahirilo (2002).

== Political career ==
Harikrishna, who had a knack for driving, drove his father's "Chaitanya Ratham" (chariot of consciousness), a revamped and customised green Chevrolet with registration number ABR 7776 during his father's political campaignings. The vehicle was reportedly used to campaign over 75,000 kms and assumed mammoth significance in the state's politics. Outspoken and rebellious by nature, Harikrishna was instrumental in staging the 1995 coup that dethroned his father N. T. Rama Rao during Chief Ministership of N. T. Rama Rao alongside N. Chandrababu Naidu, Daggubati Venkateswara Rao and Nandamuri Balakrishna. He served as the member of Andhra Pradesh Legislative Assembly during 1996–1999 as the elected MLA from Hindupur Assembly constituency. He became a Cabinet Minister for Road Transport in 1996. In a historic move, he opened the doors for women in the State Road Transport Corporation. Hundreds of women were hired as bus conductors. However, following rifts with Naidu, he floated his own Anna Telugu Desam Party in 1999 but returned to his previous party in 2006 after the ATDP failed to win a single seat in the 1999 Andhra Pradesh Legislative Assembly election. He shared a bittersweet relationship with his brother-in-law Naidu, often expressing displeasure about his son N. T. Rama Rao Jr. being ignored for the party ranks. In 2008, he was a candidate of the Telugu Desam Party and was elected to Rajya Sabha. In 2013, he renounced his Rajya Sabha seat as a mark of protest against the then United Progressive Alliance government's decision to divide Andhra Pradesh.

== Personal life ==
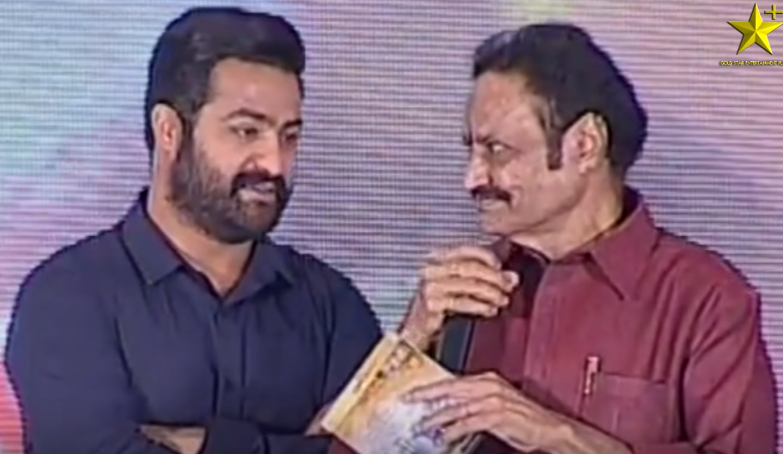
Harikrishna with his son N. T. Rama Rao Jr. at Jai Lava Kusa (2017) event

Harikrishna married Lakshmi Kumari on 22 February 1973 and they have two sons, Janaki Ram and Kalyan Ram, and a daughter, Suhasini. He later married Shalini Bhaskar Rao, a Kannadathi from Kundapur, in 1981. They have one son, Taraka Ram. His elder son, Janaki Ram, died in a road mishap, on 6 December 2014.

== Death ==
Harikrishna died in a car crash in Nalgonda district, Narketpally, on 29 August 2018 at the age of 61. He was driving at a high speed without a seat belt on his way to the Nellore district of Andhra Pradesh to attend a private ceremony of his friend, accompanied by two others. His Toyota Fortuner crashed into a road median on Nalgonda district Highway near Narkatpally when he bent over to pick up a water bottle.

His son Janaki Ram died on the same highway in 2014. Janakiram was a Telugu movie producer under the N. T. R. Arts banner who also met a tragic death in a road crash while travelling alone from Vijayawada to Hyderabad. Reports say that, his car collided with a tractor near Akumpamala village in Munagala mandal of Nalgonda district. He was rushed to a private hospital in Kodad, where he died of internal bleeding.

== Filmography ==
List of films and roles
Year	Title	Role	Notes
1967	Sri Krishnavataram	Bala Krishna	Child artist
1970	Thalla? Pellama?	Little Krishna	Child artist
1974	Tatamma Kala	Venkatesam	
1974	Ram Raheem	Raheem	
1977	Daana Veera Soora Karna	Arjuna	Also producer
1998	Sri Ramulayya	Comrade 'Sathyam'	Cameo appearance
1998	Subhalekhalu		Guest appearance
1999	Seetharama Raju	Seetayya	
2002	Lahiri Lahiri Lahirilo	Krishnama Naidu	Won—Nandi Award for Best Character Actor
2002	Yuva Rathna		Voiceover
2002	Siva Rama Raju	Ananda Bhupati Raju	Cameo appearance
2003	Seetayya	Seetayya	
2003	Tiger Harischandra Prasad	Harischandra Prasad	
2004	Swamy	Swamy	
2005	Sravanamasam	Trimurtulu	

== Awards ==
- He won Nandi Award for Best Character Actor - Lahiri Lahiri Lahirilo (2002)
