= Sambasiva Rao =

Sambasiva Rao (సాంబశివరావు) is an Indian given name. Notable people with the name include:

- Rayapati Sambasiva Rao, Indian politician and industrialist.
- Kavuri Samba Siva Rao, an Indian politician, engineer and industrialist.
- A. S. Rao or Ayyagari Sambasiva Rao, was an Indian scientist.
- Avula Sambasiva Rao, was an Indian judge.
- S. Rao Kosaraju or Sambasiva Rao Kosaraju is a professor of computer science at Johns Hopkins University,
