= Desoddharakudu =

- Theatrical release poster
- Directed by: S. S. Ravi Chandra
- Written by: Satyanand (dialogues)
- Screenplay by: S. S. Ravi Chandra
- Story by: Gollapudi Maruthi Rao
- Produced by: D. Murali Mohan Rao
- Starring: Nandamuri Balakrishna; Vijayashanti
- Cinematography: Nandamuri Mohana Krishna
- Edited by: Kotagiri Venkateswara Rao
- Music by: Chakravarthy
- Production company: Vijayabhaskar Productions
- Release date: 7 August 1986
- Running time: 150 minutes
- Country: India
- Language: Telugu
- Box office: 5 Crores

Desoddharakudu (transl. Reformer of the Country) is a 1986 Indian Telugu-language action drama film, produced by D. Murali Mohan Rao under the Vijayabhaskar Productions banner and directed by S. S. Ravi Chandra. It stars Nandamuri Balakrishna and Vijayashanti, with music composed by Chakravarthy.

== Cast ==
- Nandamuri Balakrishna as Gopi
- Vijayashanti as Vijaya
- Rao Gopal Rao as Sankarayya
- Satyanarayana as Dharma Rayudu
- Gollapudi Maruthi Rao as Madman / Special Officer
- Nutan Prasad as Narasimha Naidu
- Kanta Rao as School Master
- Sudhakar as Sivudu
- Balaji as Papa Rao
- Arun Kumar as Venu
- Suthi Veerabhadra Rao as Post Master
- Rallapalli as Kotilingam
- Jayabhaskar as Kondandam
- Dr. Siva Prasad as Drama Contractor
- Mada as Eedukondalu
- KK Sarma as Dr.Seshavatharam
- Telephone Satyanarayana as Pichiswara Rao
- Chitti Babu as Hanumanthu
- Chidatala Appa Rao as Appigadu
- Mallikarjuna Rao as Gedala Gavarraju
- Mucherla Aruna as Gowri
- Samyutha as Lakshmi
- Kakinada Shyamala as Dharma Rayudu's wife
- Kalpana Rai as Post Master's wife
- Y. Vijaya as Seetallu

== Soundtrack ==
Desoddarakudu

Film score by Chakravarthy
- Released: 1986
- Genre: Soundtrack
- Length: 20:27
- Label: Sapthaswar Audio
- Producer: Chakravarthy

Chakravarthy chronology
Anasuyamma Gari Alludu (1986)	Desoddarakudu (1986)	Kaliyuga Krishnudu (1986)

Music composed by Chakravarthy. Lyrics were written by Veturi. Music released on Sapthaswar Audio Company.

No.	Title	Singer(s)	Length
1.	"Ammaayi Muddha Banthi"	S. P. Balasubrahmanyam, P. Susheela	4:10
2.	"Entha Pani Chesindhammaa"	S. P. Balasubrahmanyam, P. Susheela	4:20
3.	"Gagana Vexed hullo"	S. P. Balasubrahmanyam, P. Susheela	4:19
4.	"Pattukunte Maasipoye"	S. P. Balasubrahmanyam, P. Susheela	3:49
5.	"Vacche Vacche Vaanajallu"	S. P. Balasubrahmanyam, P. Susheela	3:49
Total length:			20:27
