= Basavatarakam Indo American Cancer Hospital =

Non-profit hospital in Telangana, India

Geography
- Location: Road No. 10, IAS Officers Quarters, Nandi Nagar, Banjara Hills, Hyderabad, Telangana, Telangana, India

Organisation
- Type: Specialist; Oncology

History
- Founded: 1986

Links
- Website: https://basavatarakam.org/
- Lists: Hospitals in India

Basavatarakam Indo American Cancer Hospital & Research Institute (BIACH&RI) is a premier nonprofit organization (NPO), tertiary care cancer hospital and research center located in Hyderabad, India. It was founded in 1986 by Indian matinée idol and politician Nandamuri Taraka Rama Rao, in memory of his wife, Nandamuri Basavatarakam, who succumbed to cancer. The hospital was established under the Nandamuri Basavataraka Ramarao Memorial Cancer Foundation (NBTRCF), in collaboration with the Indo-American Cancer Organisation (IACO), USA.

BIACH&RI provides oncology services, including medical, surgical, radiation, and paediatric oncology, It also functions as a research and training institute, conducting clinical studies and providing oncology training to medical professionals, including national and international collaborations. In 2023, it was ranked second best cancer hospital in India.

== History ==
BIACH&RI was founded by former Andhra Pradesh chief minister and actor Nandamuri Taraka Rama Rao in memory of his wife, Nandamuri Basavatarakam, who died of cancer.

The foundation stone for the hospital was laid in 1986, and following international collaboration and support from Indian and overseas oncologists, the hospital was inaugurated on June 22, 2000, by then Prime Minister of India Atal Bihari Vajpayee. It was established under the NBTRCF with support from the Indo-American Cancer Organisation (IACO), USA.

In 2023, Kurapati Krishnaiah was appointed CEO.

== Leadership and Expansion ==
As of 2025, the Chairman of Basavatarakam Indo American Cancer Hospital & Research Institute is Nandamuri Balakrishna, actor, politician, and the son of the hospital's founder, N. T. Rama Rao. He is currently heading the Board of Trustees and has played a pivotal role in guiding the institution's vision and growth. Under his leadership, the hospital has significantly expanded its infrastructure, services, and outreach, while remaining committed to affordable and accessible cancer care.

The hospital announced an oncology and research centre in Amaravati, the capital of Andhra Pradesh. Spread across 15 acres, the facility is intended for cancer diagnosis, treatment, and research. The institute also conducts clinical studies and provides oncology training to medical professionals, including through national and international collaborations.

=== Donations ===
The hospital operates as a nonprofit organization and relies on donations from individuals, charitable organizations, and corporate donors worldwide. It collaborates with Indian and international oncologists and researchers. In addition, CriticalRiver, a global digital and technology consulting company, has partnered with Basavatarakam Indo-American Cancer Hospital & Research Institute to support cancer awareness and early detection initiatives among women in rural India.
