= Naravaripalle =

- Location in Andhra Pradesh, India Naravaripalle (India)
- Coordinates: 13°37′0″N 79°16′0″E
- Country: India
- State: Andhra Pradesh
- City: Tirupati
- District: Tirupati

Languages
  - Official: Telugu
- Time zone: UTC+5:30 (IST)
- Vehicle registration: AP

Naravaripalle is a village near Tirupati. It is located in Chandragiri mandal in Tirupati district of the Indian state of Andhra Pradesh. N. Chandrababu Naidu was born and brought up in this village.
