= Nandamuri Balakrishna =

Indian actor, film producer, and politician (born 1960)

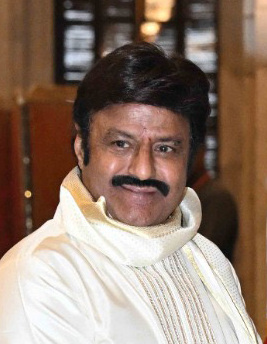
- Balakrishna in 2025

Member of Andhra Pradesh Legislative Assembly
- Incumbent
- Assumed office 16 May 2014
- Preceded by: P. Abdul Ghani
- Constituency: Hindupur

Personal details
- Born: 10 June 1960 (age 66) Madras, Madras State, India (present-day Chennai, Tamil Nadu)
- Party: Telugu Desam Party (TDP)
- Spouse: Vasundhara Devi (m. 1982)
- Children: 3
- Parent: N. T. Rama Rao (father)
- Relatives: Nandamuri–Nara family
- Education: Nizam College, Hyderabad
- Occupation: Actor; film producer; politician
- Awards: Padma Bhushan (2025)
- Works: Full list

Nandamuri Balakrishna (born 10 June 1960), also known as Balayya and N.B.K., is an Indian actor, producer, politician and philanthropist known for his works in Telugu cinema. The son of Indian matinée idol and former Chief Minister of Andhra Pradesh N. T. Rama Rao, Balakrishna made his debut as a child artist at the age of 14 with the film Tatamma Kala (1974). Balakrishna is an elected member of the Andhra Pradesh Legislative Assembly from Hindupur constituency since 2014. He is the Chairman of Basavatarakam Indo-American Cancer Hospital and Research Institute.

Known for his work as a dancer and an actor in Telugu cinema, Balakrishna was the chief guest at the 43rd IFFI. In 2025, the Government of India honoured him with third-highest civilian award in India, the Padma Bhushan. In the same year, He entered the World Book of Records for completing 50 years in films. He was also awarded the Special Recognition for Contribution to Bharatiya Cinema at the 56th IFFI. He is a recipient of three state Nandi Awards, two SIIMA Awards, and an IIFA Award.

Balakrishna starred in more than hundred feature films in a variety of roles. He achieved commercial success, with works such as Sahasame Jeevitham (1984), Janani Janmabhoomi (1984), Mangammagari Manavadu (1984), Apoorva Sahodarulu (1986), Muvva Gopaludu (1987), Muddula Mavayya (1989), Nari Nari Naduma Murari (1990), Lorry Driver (1990), Aditya 369 (1991), Rowdy Inspector (1992), Bangaru Bullodu (1993), Bhairava Dweepam (1994), Peddannayya (1997), Samarasimha Reddy (1999), Narasimha Naidu (2001), Lakshmi Narasimha (2004), Simha (2010), Legend (2014), Akhanda (2021), Veera Simha Reddy (2023), Bhagavanth Kesari (2023) and Daaku Maharaaj (2025).

Balakrishna experimented with biographical, historical and hagiographical films. He played poet Vemulawada Bheemakavi in Vemulawada Bheemakavi (1976); Abhimanyu in Daana Veera Soora Karna (1977); Jahangir in Akbar Salim Anarkali (1979); Narada in Sri Tirupati Venkateswara Kalyanam (1979); Sidda in Srimadvirat Veerabrahmendra Swami Charitra (1984); Krishnadevaraya in Aditya 369 (1991); Satya Harischandra and Dushyanta in Brahmarshi Viswamitra (1991); Lord Krishna and Arjuna in Sri Krishnarjuna Vijayam (1996); Pundarika in Pandurangadu (2008); N. T. Rama Rao in NTR: Mahanayakudu (2019) and NTR: Kathanayakudu (2019); and Lord Rama in Sri Rama Rajyam (2011) featured at the 42nd IFFI. In his 100th film, he played Gautamiputra Satakarni, second-century ruler of the Satavahana dynasty in the epic war film Gautamiputra Satakarni (2017). Balakrishna has received three state Nandi Awards for Best Actor for his works in Narasimha Naidu (2001), Simha (2010), and Legend (2014).

== Early life and family ==
Nandamuri Balakrishna was born on 10 June 1960 in a Telugu family to Indian matinee idol and three-time chief minister of Andhra Pradesh N. T. Rama Rao and his wife Basavatarakam, in Madras (present-day Chennai, Tamil Nadu). He earned a bachelor's degree in commerce from Nizam College, Hyderabad. In 1982, at the age of 22, Balakrishna married Vasundhara Devi. They have three children.

== Film career ==
=== 1974-1986: Early years and family dramas ===
Balakrishna made his acting debut as a child artiste in Tatamma Kala, which was directed by N. T. Rama Rao, his father. He acted in several films, many of which were directed by his father, including Daana Veera Soora Karna (1977), Sri Madvirata Parvam (1979), Akbar Salim Anarkali (1979) and Sri Tirupati Venkateswara Kalyanam (1979). At the age of 16, he acted in a movie titled Annadammula Anubandham (1975), a remake of Dharmendra's Hindi movie Yaadon Ki Baaraat, and played a brother to his real life father, Rama Rao. Balakrishna appeared as son to his real life brother Nandamuri Harikrishna in the movie Dana Veera Sura Karna.

In 1984, he debuted in an adult role with Sahasame Jeevitham. He then starred in the drama film Mangammagari Manavadu the same year, alongside Bhanumathi and Suhasini, directed by Kodi Ramakrishna. In the same year, he acted in Kathanayakudu and in the biographical film Shrimad Virat Veerabrahmendra Swami Charitra. He also appeared in Janani Janmabhoomi in 1984, directed by K. Viswanath. In 1985, he acted with Akkineni Nageswara Rao in the film Bharyabhartala Bandham, alongside Rajani. In 1986, he acted in movies such as Muddula Krishnaiah, Seetharama Kalyanam, Anasuyamma Gari Alludu and Deshoddharakudu, which gradually increased his potential at the box office.

=== 1987–1999: Mass films and rise to prominence ===
In 1987, Balakrishna acted in a dual role in the film Apoorva Sahodarulu, directed by K. Raghavendra Rao. In the same year, he starred in President Gari Abbai, directed by T. Rama Rao and Muvva Gopaludu, by Kodi Ramakrishna. His other films like Inspector Pratap, Bharatamlo Bala Chandrudu, Tiragabadda Telugubidda, Raktabhishekam were also successful at the box office. In 1989, he paired with Vijayashanti in Muddula Mavayya directed by Kodi Ramakrishna. In 1990, he acted in Nari Nari Naduma Murari, directed by A. Kodandarami Reddy, alongside Shobana and Nirosha. In the same year, he appeared in B. Gopal's Lorry Driver, opposite Vijayashanti.

In 1991, he acted in science fiction film Aditya 369, directed by Singeetam Srinivasa Rao. This was the only science fiction film in Telugu cinema during that period of time. He then had two releases in 1992, Dharma Kshetram with Divya Bharathi and Rowdy Inspector, directed by B. Gopal. In 1993, he had two releases on the same day, which are Nippu Ravva, alongside Shobana and Vijayashanti, directed by A. Kodandarami Reddy; Bangaru Bullodu, alongside Raveena Tandon and Ramya Krishna, directed by Ravi Raja Pinisetty. His next appearance was a role in Bhairava Dweepam in 1994, directed by Singeetam Srinivasa Rao. In Brahmarshi Viswamitra, directed by NTR, he played as Satya Harischandra and Dushyanta. Between 1994 and 1999, he acted in movies such as Bobbili Simham, Vamsanikokkadu, Peddannayya and moderate successes such as Top Hero, Muddula Mogudu, Maato Pettukoku, Raana and Pavitra Prema. In the year 1999, he acted in B. Gopal's action film Samarasimha Reddy, opposite Simran and Anjala Zhaveri.

=== 2000–2009: Career fluctuations ===
In 2000, Balakrishna acted in Goppinti Alludu, directed by E. V. V. Satyanarayana with Simran. In 2001, he starred in the B. Gopal-directed faction film Narasimha Naidu, opposite Simran once again. The film became the highest-grossing Telugu film of all time until the record Balakrishna won his first Nandi Award for Best Actor for his performance. In the same year, he appeared in Bhalevadivi Basu with Shilpa Shetty and Anjala Zaveri. His 2002 and 2003 films include Seema Simham and Chennakesava Reddy. The former received unfavourable reviews and was a box office flop, but the latter one was critically and financially successful. In 2004, he performed in a remake of the 2003 Tamil film Saamy, titled Lakshmi Narasimha, with Asin. The film and Balakrishna's performance won critical acclaim and was a financial success. During the period, he also announced plans to act and direct in the remake of Nartanasala, starred by his father, and a launch event was held in Hyderabad in March 2003. Produced by Pusapati Lakshmipati Raju, the film was announced to have an ensemble cast also featuring Soundarya, Srihari, Saikumar, Uday Kiran and Asin in lead roles. However, despite a grand launch, the film was later shelved following the sudden demise of Soundarya.

The years from 2005 to 2009 saw action-drama flicks such as Vijayendra Varma, Veerabhadra, Allari Pidugu, Okka Magaadu and Maharathi which did not perform well at the box office. He paired with Sneha and Tabu in the mythological movie Pandurangadu (2008), directed by K. Raghavendra Rao. He played the dual roles of Krishna and Panduranga. Rediff described his performance as "Balakrishna does justice to both the roles of God and Ranga. He shines in the climax of the movie. It's quite a task to step into NTR's shoes, but his son has done pretty well, though one does miss NTR in the role of Krishna!". The film was an average success and his performance won him the Santosham Best Actor Award. In the year 2009, he starred in the family drama Mitrudu, alongside Priyamani in a slightly different role – that of a dependable friend and confidante to the female lead. The film opened to average reviews.

=== 2010–present: Continued fluctuations with major successes ===
In 2010, Balakrishna acted in Boyapati Srinu's film Simha, alongside Nayantara and Sneha Ullal. He played a dual role as father and son. The film opened to positive reviews, and went on to become the highest-grossing Telugu film of the year. A review in Rediff said about his performance: "Balakrishna has put in a restrained performance. Though his character is supposed to roar at times, he seems subdued most of the time. But he's given plenty to be pleased about as it is his show all the way." In 2011, he acted in the mythological film Sri Rama Rajyam, based on the epic Ramayana. He played a triple role in the 2012 action drama Adhinayakudu as grandfather, father and grandson. Balakrishna was the chief guest for the 43rd International Film Festival of India, 2012. At the event, he was accompanied by Governor of Goa, B. V. Wanchoo, and the Chief Minister Manohar Parrikar during the closing ceremony. Balakrishna, in his speech, said that although the Telugu film industry finds no place in the film festival by way of representation its films, 80 percent of the movies that are produced in India are in regional languages, out of which Fifty percent are from South India. "Today, film industry is facing competition from radio, and television as also from piracy," he stated. He also maintained that the film festivals have enlarged his vision towards his career.

In 2014, he acted in Boyapati Srinu's film Legend, alongside Sonal Chauhan and Jagapathi Babu. He played the title role in the biographical and historical film Gautamiputra Satakarni, his 100th film. The film is directed by Krish and is based on the life of the 2nd century ruler of the Satavahana dynasty, Gautamiputra Satakarni. In 2018, he acted in Jai Simha, which was directed by K. S. Ravikumar and started shooting for the N.T.R. biopic in which he reprised the role of his father. The film was made in two parts, the first part NTR: Kathanayakudu was released on 9 January 2019, with the second NTR: Mahanayakudu on 22 February 2019. His 2021 movie Akhanda marks third collaboration with director Boyapati Srinu, featuring his dual role as Aghori Baba and a farmer. It was a super hit at the box office. In 2023, Nandamuri Balakrishna starred in the Telugu film Bhagavanth Kesari.

== Political career ==
Since the founding of the Telugu Desam Party (TDP) in 1982, Balakrishna campaigned for it in every election for Rama Rao and Chandrababu Naidu, but did not enter the electoral battle until 2014. During a vacation to his father-in-law's house, he went on a political campaign for TDP all over the East Godavari district. He contested in the 2014 Andhra Pradesh Legislative Assembly election and won the Hindupur Assembly Constituency seat with a reasonable majority. He also won again in the 2019 Andhra Pradesh Legislative Assembly election, consecutively. Hindupur, in Anantapur district, has been a stronghold for TDP since the formation of the party in 1983. It was once represented by his father and later for a term by his elder brother, Nandamuri Harikrishna. Balakrishna is the third member from the family to represent it in the State Assembly.

== Controversy ==
Balakrishna was involved in a shootout controversy which took place on 3 June 2004 around 8:50 PM at his residence in Jubilee Hills, Hyderabad. He allegedly fired shots at producer Bellamkonda Suresh and his associate, Satyanarayana Chowdhary. Later, both the wounded were admitted into Apollo hospital. The circumstances under which the case was handled led to controversy as purported by the Human Rights Forum (HRF). The HRF questioned the authenticity of people who handled the case, and the circumstances under which Balakrishna was shielded from police by being given refuge in Care Hospital without any justifiable cause.

The two victims gave statements before the magistrate, alleging that Balakrishna fired shots at them, but later retracted their earlier statements. Balakrishna was later arrested on 6 June and produced before Fifth Metropolitan Magistrate. A show cause notice was also served to Balakrishna's wife Vasundhara Devi as the weapon used was registered to her, and she could not give sufficient protection to her weapon. Later, Balakrishna was granted bail on the conditions that he should not leave Hyderabad without the court's permission and to surrender his passport.

== Awards ==
=== Civilian honors ===
- Padma Bhushan - 2025

=== National honors ===
- Special Recognition for Contribution to Bharatiya Cinema Award at the 56th IFFI 2025.

== State Honors ==
Nandi Awards

- NTR National Award (2024)
- Best Actor – Narasimha Naidu (2001)
- Best Actor – Simha (2010)
- Best Actor – Legend (2014)

== Other Awards ==
3rd IIFA Utsavam

- Golden Legacy Award for outstanding achievement in Indian cinema

SIIMA Awards

- Best Actor – Legend

CineMAA Awards

- CineMAA Award for Best Actor - Male – Simha (2010)

Santosham Film Awards

- Santosham Best Actor Award – Pandurangadu
- Santosham Best Actor Award – Simha
- Santosham Best Actor Award – Sri Rama Rajyam

TSR National Awards

- Best Actor Award for the year 2010 – Male – Simha
- Best Actor Award for the year 2011 – Male – Sri Rama Rajyam
- Best Actor Award for the year 2014 – Male – Legend

== Others ==
- Samman Award – Highest taxpayer in the charge of Commissioner of Income Tax.
- Bharata Muni award Best Actor of the year 2010 – Simha
- Bharata Muni award Best Actor of the year 2011 – Sri Rama Rajyam
- A.P. CINE Goers Association Best Actor Award – Narasimha Naidu Chennakesava Reddy and Pandurangadu.
- Akkineni Abhinaya Puraskaram for the year 2007
- South Indian Cinematographers Awards 2015 Best Actor –Legend
