= N. Chandrababu Naidu =

13th Chief Minister of Andhra Pradesh (born 1950)

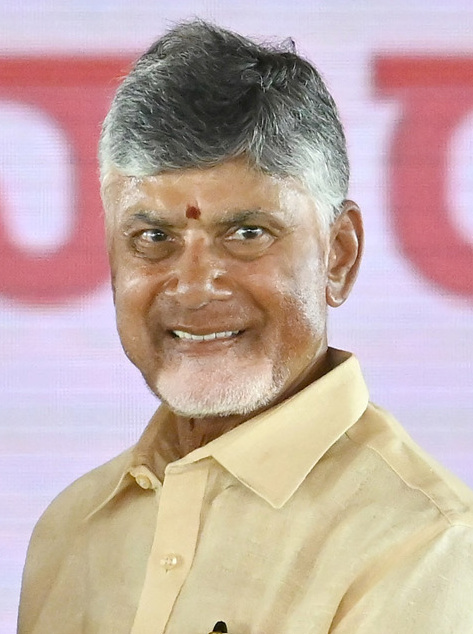
- Naidu in 2024

13th Chief Minister of Andhra Pradesh
- Incumbent
- Assumed office 12 June 2024
- Governor: Syed Abdul Nazeer
- Deputy: Pawan Kalyan
- Cabinet: Naidu IV
- Preceded by: Y. S. Jagan Mohan Reddy
Additional ministries
Incumbent
Assumed office 12 June 2024
Ministry and Departments	General Administration; Law & Order; Public Enterprises; Other departments not allocated to any Minister
Preceded by	Y. S. Jagan Mohan Reddy
- In office 8 June 2014 – 29 May 2019
- Governor: E. S. L. Narasimhan
- Deputy: Nimmakayala Chinarajappa; K. E. Krishnamurthy
- Cabinet: Naidu III
- Succeeded by: Y. S. Jagan Mohan Reddy
Additional ministries
In office 8 June 2014 – 29 May 2019
Ministry and Departments	Investment; Infrastructure; Happiness Index; General Administration; Other departments not allocated to any Minister
Succeeded by	Y. S. Jagan Mohan Reddy
- In office 1 September 1995 – 13 May 2004
- Governor: Krishan Kant; Gopala Ramanujam; C. Rangarajan; Surjit Singh Barnala
- Cabinet: Naidu I; Naidu II
- Preceded by: N. T. Rama Rao
- Succeeded by: Y. S. Rajasekhara Reddy
Additional ministries
In office 1 September 1995 – 13 May 2004
Ministry and Departments	Investment; Infrastructure; General Administration; Other departments not allocated to any Minister
Succeeded by	Y. S. Rajasekhara Reddy

13th Leader of the Opposition in Andhra Pradesh Legislative Assembly
- In office 13 June 2019 – 5 June 2024
- Governor: E. S. L. Narasimhan; Biswabhusan Harichandan; S. Abdul Nazeer
- Chief Minister: Y. S. Jagan Mohan Reddy
- Preceded by: Y. S. Jagan Mohan Reddy
- Succeeded by: Vacant
- In office 2 June 2004 – 28 February 2014
- Governor: Sushilkumar Shinde; Rameshwar Thakur; N. D. Tiwari; E. S. L. Narasimhan
- Chief Minister: Y. S. Rajasekhara Reddy; Konijeti Rosaiah; N. Kiran Kumar Reddy
- Preceded by: N. Kiran Kumar Reddy
- Succeeded by: Y. S. Jagan Mohan Reddy

1st National President of Telugu Desam Party
- Incumbent
- Assumed office 29 May 2015
- National General Secretary: Kinjarapu Ram Mohan Naidu; Nara Lokesh
- Preceded by: Position established

2nd President of Telugu Desam Party
- In office 1 September 1995 – 29 May 2015
- General Secretary: Alimineti Madhava Reddy (1995-2000); Tulla Devender Goud (2000-2008); Kadiyam Srihari (2008-2013); Ravula Chandra Sekar Reddy (2013-2015)
- Preceded by: N. T. Rama Rao
- Succeeded by: Position abolished

Andhra Pradesh Minister of Revenue, Relief, Rehabilitation, Finance, Planning, Small Savings and Lotteries
- In office 12 December 1994 – 1 September 1995
- Governor: Krishan Kant
- Chief Minister: N. T. Rama Rao
- Succeeded by: Ashok Gajapathi Raju

Andhra Pradesh Minister of Cinematography, Technical Education, Minor irrigation, Diary and Animal Husbandary
- In office 1980–1982
- Governor: K. C. Abraham
- Chief Minister: T. Anjaiah; Bhavanam Venkatarami Reddy

Member of the Andhra Pradesh Legislative Assembly
- Incumbent
- Assumed office 1989
- Preceded by: N. Rangaswami Naidu
- Constituency: Kuppam
- In office 1978–1983
- Preceded by: Constituency established
- Succeeded by: Medasani Venkatarma Naidu
- Constituency: Chandragiri

Personal details
- Born: Nara Chandra Babu Naidu; 20 April 1950 (age 76) Naravaripalle, Madras State, India (present-day Andhra Pradesh)
- Party: Telugu Desam Party (1983–present)
- Other political affiliations: Indian National Congress (Indira) (1975–1983)
- Spouse: Nara Bhuvaneswari (m. 1981)
- Children: Nara Lokesh (son)
- Relatives: See Nandamuri–Nara family
- Education: Sri Venkateswara University, Tirupati (M.A.)
- Website: https://ncbn.info/
- Positions Held: 1975–1977: Local Youth President, INC; 1978–83: Member of Andhra Pradesh Legislative Assembly, Chandragiri constituency; 1980–83: Cabinet Minister of Andhra Pradesh; 1985–94: General Secretary of Telugu Desam Party; since 1989: Member of Andhra Pradesh Legislative Assembly, Kuppam constituency; 1994–95: Finance and Revenue Minister of Andhra Pradesh; 1999–2004: Convener of National Democratic Alliance; 1995–2004: 13th Chief Minister of Andhra Pradesh; 1995–2014: 2nd President of the Telugu Desam Party; 2004–2014: 8th Leader of Opposition of the Andhra Pradesh Legislative Assembly; 2014–present: 1st National President of the Telugu Desam Party; 2014–19: 13th Chief Minister of Andhra Pradesh; 2014–18: Convener Of National Democratic Alliance; 2019–24: 8th Leader of Opposition of the Andhra Pradesh Andhra Pradesh Assembly; 2024–tba: Convener of National Democratic Alliance; 2024–present: 13th Chief Minister of Andhra Pradesh

Nara Chandrababu Naidu (Telugu pronunciation: [ˈnɑːrɑː ˈtʃʌnˌdrɑː ˈbɑːbuː ˈnaɪduː]; born 20 April 1950), commonly known as CBN, is an Indian politician who is currently serving as the Chief Minister of Andhra Pradesh since 2024. He holds the record of longest-serving Chief Minister in the political history of Telugu states. He is the national president of the Telugu Desam Party (TDP).

In 1978, he was elected to the Andhra Pradesh Legislative Assembly from the Indian National Congress party, and from 1980 to 1982, he served as a minister in the state cabinet. Afterwards, he switched party allegiance and joined TDP, which had been founded by his father-in-law N. T. Rama Rao. Naidu served as a TDP Member of the Legislative Assembly (MLA) from 1989 to 1995. In 1995, he became the Chief Minister of Andhra Pradesh.

During his two previous terms as Chief Minister, Naidu's public image was that of a visionary economic reformer and proponent of information technology–driven economic growth. His policies brought modernisation and significant investments, particularly in Hyderabad, where he directed the founding of HITEC City, Genome Valley, HITEX Exhibition and the Financial District. He also established the Hyderabad Multi-Modal Transport System (MMTS), which was inaugurated during his tenure to improve urban mobility. Additionally, he initiated major infrastructure projects such as the Hyderabad Outer Ring Road and laid the groundwork for the Rajiv Gandhi International Airport. He also had a role in national politics, first as the convener of the United Front in 1996. He supported the Bharatiya Janata Party (BJP)-led National Democratic Alliance (NDA) after the 1999 Lok Sabha elections, in which TDP won 29 seats, enhancing Naidu's reputation as a nationally prominent politician. In 2014, Naidu returned as Chief Minister, winning in the now-residuary (due to bifurcation) Andhra Pradesh.

His leadership earned him significant global recognition, including the Golden Peacock Award for Public Service, USIBC's Transformative Chief Minister Award, IT Indian of the Millennium, Economic Times Business Person of the Year, Time's South Asian of the Year, and an honorary professorship from the Kellogg School of Management.

In the 2019 Andhra Pradesh Legislative Assembly election, Naidu's party faced an electoral setback, with TDP winning only 23 out of 175 seats. In September 2023, Naidu was arrested by the Crime Investigation Department (CID) police in Andhra Pradesh due to alleged involvement in the skills development case and was granted bail by Andhra Pradesh High Court in November 2023. In a significant legal development in February 2026, the Enforcement Directorate (ED) cleared Naidu of all charges in the skill development case. In the 2024 Andhra Pradesh Legislative Assembly election, the TDP returned to power once again in a landslide toppling the incumbent YSRCP government and Naidu became Chief Minister for the fourth time.

== Early life and education ==
Naidu was born on 20 April 1950 in a Telugu Hindu agrarian family to Nara Kharjura Naidu and his mother Amanamma in Naravaripalle, Tirupati district, in present-day Andhra Pradesh. (Note: The source also spelled the name as Amannama) He has a younger brother Nara Ramamurthy Naidu and two younger sisters. Naidu has vitiligo, an autoimmune disease that causes white patches on the skin.

Since his village had no school, Naidu attended primary school in Seshapuram up to class five and the Chandragiri Government High School up to class 10. He completed his B.A. degree in 1972 from Sri Venkateswara Arts College, Tirupati. Later, he got his master's degree in economics from Sri Venkateswara University. In 1974, under the guidance of professor Dr. D. L. Narayana he started work on his Ph.D. on the topic of Economic ideas of Professor N. G. Ranga, but did not complete his Ph.D.

== Earlier political career ==
=== Indian National Congress ===
Naidu started his political activities as a student union leader in Sri Venkateswara University while pursuing his master's degree. In 1975, he joined Indian Youth Congress and became the president of its local chapter in Pulicherla. After the emergency was imposed on the country in 1975, he became a supporter of Sanjay Gandhi.

With the help of N. G. Ranga, Naidu secured a candidacy from the Congress party, under its 20% quota for the youth, and became a member of the Legislative Assembly (MLA) for the Chandragiri constituency in the 1978 assembly elections. He initially served as a director of Andhra Pradesh Small Scale Industries Development Corporation. Later, he was appointed as a minister in T. Anjaiah's government. Between 1980 and 1983, Naidu held various portfolios, including archives, cinematography, technical education, and minor irrigation in the state government. He became the youngest MLA at the age of 28 and a minister at the age of 30 in Andhra Pradesh at that time.

As the cinematography minister, Naidu came in contact with N. T. Rama Rao, a popular film star in Telugu cinema. In September 1981, he married Bhuvaneswari, Rao's second daughter.

=== Telugu Desam Party ===
In 1982, N. T. Rama Rao, formed the Telugu Desam Party (TDP) and swept the Andhra Pradesh assembly polls held in 1983. Chandrababu Naidu, who was his son-in-law, remained in the Congress Party. However, he was defeated by a TDP candidate in the elections from Chandragiri assembly constituency. Soon after, he joined the Telugu Desam Party. Initially, Naidu involved himself in the party work, organising training camps and computerising membership records. He played an active role during the 1984 August crisis in the government triggered by Nadendla Bhaskara Rao's coup. NTR appointed Naidu as general secretary of the TDP in 1986.

=== Legislative career (1989–1994) ===
In the 1989 assembly election, Naidu contested from Kuppam constituency as a TDP candidate and won by 5,000 votes. INC, however, was elected to power, so Naidu was in the opposition. Rama Rao appointed him as a coordinator of the TDP, in which capacity he handled the party's role of the main opposition in the assembly which won him wide appreciation from both the party and the public. His role during this phase, both inside the Legislative Assembly and outside, is seen as a critical factor for the subsequent success of the party.

Naidu won the 1994 elections from Kuppam constituency. He became the Finance and Revenue Minister in N. T. Rama Rao's ministry.

== First and second term as Chief Minister of Andhra Pradesh (1995-2004) ==
On 1 September 1995, Naidu, at the age of 45, was sworn in as the Chief Minister following a successful coup against the leadership of N.T. Rama Rao. The internal rebellion was triggered by the controversial role of Lakshmi Parvathi, NTR's second wife, in the party and the government. Naidu was able to secure the support of the majority of the legislators and has hence served as the leader of the party.

=== Second term ===
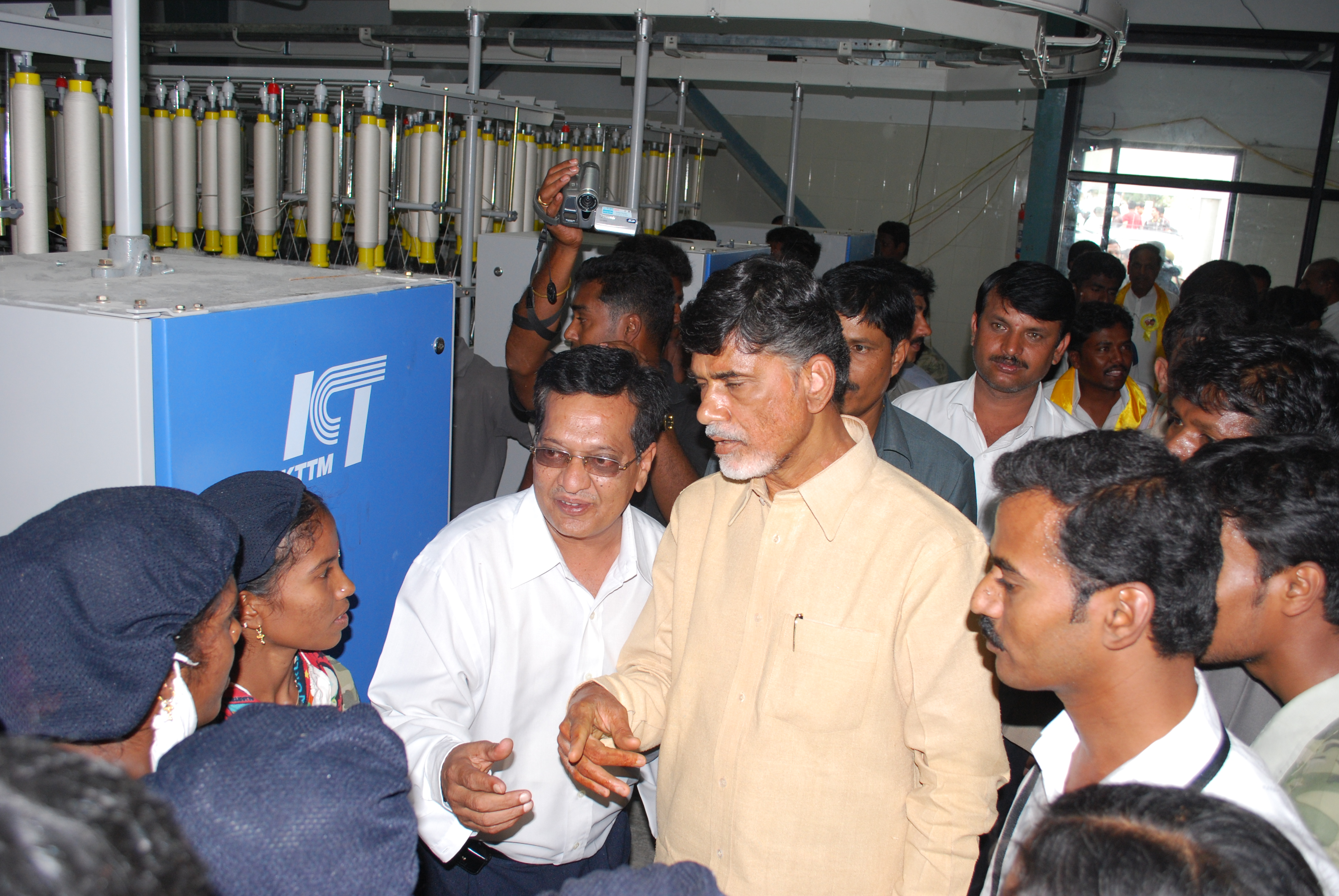
Naidu speaking with workers in a textile factory

In the 1999 state legislature elections, Chandrababu Naidu led his party to victory, securing 180 out of 294 seats in the state assembly. Additionally, the TDP won 29 out of 42 seats in the Parliament elections. The TDP's tally in the Lok Sabha made it not only the biggest of the BJP's allies, but also the fourth largest party in the Lok Sabha. These elections marked a critical juncture for Naidu, as they served as a significant test of his legitimacy both as the Chief Minister of the state and as the President of the TDP. Upon his return to power, the media hailed him as the first economic reformer to secure a strong electoral mandate.

=== Assassination attempt ===
On 1 October 2003, Naidu survived a land mine blast by the People's War Group (PWG) near Alipiri tollgate in Tirupati. The Chief Minister's convoy was attacked on his way to Tirumala to participate in the annual ritual of Brahmotsavam of Lord Venkateswara atop the seven hills. A total of 17 Claymore mines were planted, of which 9 exploded. Naidu was the first Chief Minister in the country to have been targeted by the ultra-left-wing Naxalites for assassination. Naidu's escape with minor injuries was considered miraculous given the severity of the blast. The PWG claimed it attacked him for being a "World Bank agent."

=== Role in National Politics ===
Chandrababu Naidu's involvement in national politics during the period of 1996 to 2004 was dominated by non-Congress coalition politics in Delhi. In the aftermath of the 1996 parliamentary elections, he assumed the role of convenor for the United Front, a coalition comprising 13 political parties that secured power at the Centre. The coalition government was headed by H.D. Deve Gowda and later I.K. Gujral between 1996 and 1998. The United Front had its headquarters at Andhra Pradesh Bhavan in New Delhi.

Subsequently, Chandrababu Naidu's significance in national affairs got amplified after the 1999 Lok Sabha elections. The TDP and the BJP, which had a pre-poll understanding in the state, together won 36 MPs out of 42. The BJP emerged as the largest single party in the Lok Sabha. The TDP extended the support of 29 of its MPs to the National Democratic Alliance (NDA) government headed by A. B. Vajpayee. TDP did not join the government, extending only 'issue-based support'. Naidu claimed that though Vajpayee had offered eight cabinet berths to his party, the TDP stayed away from the union cabinet and offered external support to the NDA government.

== Leader of the Opposition (2004-2014) ==
Naidu, soon after the assassination attempt on him, dissolved the state assembly. Elections to the state were held along with the parliamentary polls in April 2004. The TDP government faced anti-incumbency fuelled by high power tariffs and the absence of support to the agricultural sector. Besides, the newly formed Congress(I)-TRS alliance posed a major challenge to the TDP popularity in Telangana. The Telugu Desam Party was defeated in both the state and Lok Sabha elections. The Congress Party won 185 seats while the TDP ended up with 47 seats in the assembly, the then lowest in the party's electoral history. The TDP won only 5 seats out of 42 in Parliament. Naidu felt that the severe drought that gripped Andhra Pradesh the previous year as well as advancing the timing of the election were the major reasons for his defeat.

In the 2009 parliamentary and assembly elections, Naidu faced another challenge as popular actor Chiranjeevi formed Praja Rajyam party and turned the election into a three-cornered contest. The TDP, which formed an alliance with TRS this time, once again lost to the incumbent Congress Party. The TDP secured 92 seats in the assembly, whereas the Congress got 156 seats, a thin majority in the assembly. Chiranjeevi's Praja Rajyam won in 18 seats. Naidu blamed Chiranjeevi's entry into the political arena for his party's debacle.

== Third term as the Chief Minister of Andhra Pradesh (2014-2019) ==
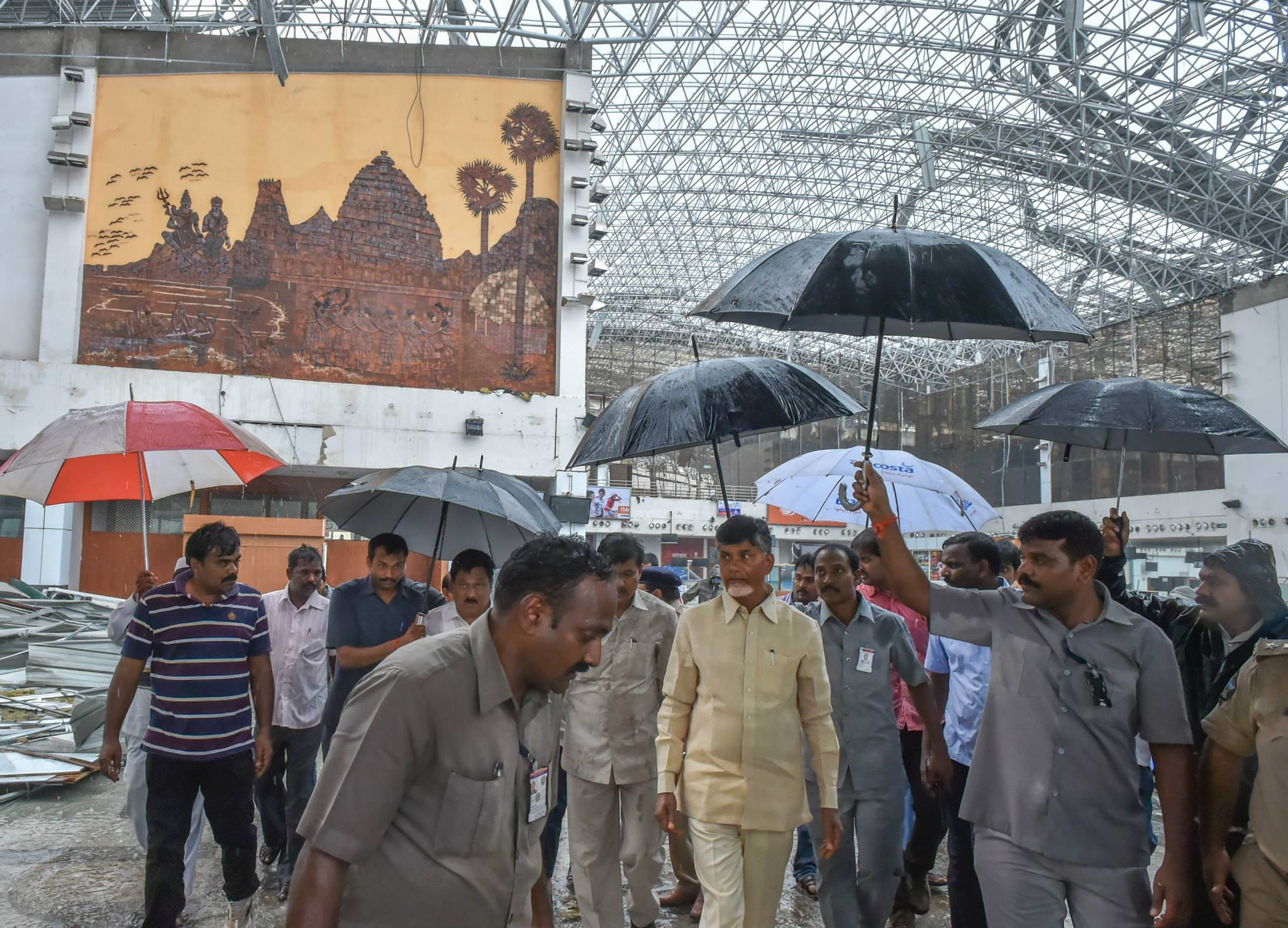
Chandrababu Naidu at rescue operations of Visakhapatnam airport the time of hudhud cyclone

After the bifurcation, elections were held in 2014 in the newly formed states of Andhra Pradesh and Telangana. Naidu formed an alliance again with the BJP and Jana Sena Party and returned to power in the bifurcated, residual Andhra Pradesh state, winning 102 seats out of 175 seats. The TDP also won 16 Lok Sabha seats. Naidu took oath as the first Chief Minister of the residuary state of Andhra Pradesh at Mangalagiri on the grounds of Acharya Nagarjuna University near Guntur. His party joined the NDA government at the Centre and held two portfolios in the union cabinet. Two cabinet berths in the state were allocated to the BJP.

The Chief Minister faced a host of challenges in the new state. The newly born state of Andhra Pradesh was left without a capital city and was deprived of a major economic hub. Naidu took up the construction of a new capital city, named Amaravati, on the southern side of river Krishna near Vijayawada. During Naidu's term, the state achieved top ranking in the World Bank's Ease of Business rankings in the country since 2015. The state attracted mega companies like Kia Motors, Isuzu Motors, Pepsi, Mondelez and Foxconn.

=== 2015 cash-for-vote scam ===
Naidu's name figured in the cash-for-vote scandal which pertains to the alleged role of the TDP to buy votes in the 2015 Telangana Legislative Council elections. It started off when the TDP leaders of Telangana state were caught on video footage, aired in the media, allegedly offering bribes to a nominated MLA, Elvis Stephenson, for his vote in the 2015 Council elections. Telangana Anti-Corruption Bureau (ACB) claimed that it was in possession of a recorded telephonic conversation that purportedly took place between Elvis Stephenson and TDP president N Chandrababu Naidu, who was the then Andhra Pradesh Chief Minister. Both the TRS (now BRS) and YSR Congress Party demanded that Naidu should be named in the case. However, the ACB and later the Enforcement Directorate (ED), in their charge sheets, did not name Naidu as an accused in the case, as they did not find evidence to prove that the money was sent to Stevenson at the behest of Naidu.

=== Special status dispute and break with BJP ===
In March 2018, the TDP withdrew its two ministers from Prime Minister Narendra Modi's government over the issue of Andhra special category status (SCS). The SCS had been promised by the previous Congress government on the floor of the Parliament during the passage of the AP Reorganisation Bill. Subsequently, Naidu announced the TDP's departure from the National Democratic Alliance (NDA) due to the "injustice" inflicted upon Andhra Pradesh by the denial of SCS.

In 2016, Naidu had previously agreed to the announcement made by the then Union Finance Minister Arun Jaitley regarding a financial package for Andhra Pradesh instead of granting it special status. In this backdrop, the decision of the ruling TDP to withdraw from the NDA was perceived as a political response to the mounting criticism from the Opposition regarding the non-fulfilment of the special category status. Naidu further criticised the central government on the issue by staging a hunger strike, known as 'Dharma Porata Deeksha' (a day-long 'protest for justice'), in Delhi. This event marked a significant deterioration in the relationship between the TDP and the BJP.

As of February 2018, It was reported by the Association for Democratic Reforms (ADR) that he was the richest Chief Minister in India, with total assets of 177 crore.

=== Alliance with the Congress Party ===
In an unexpected turn of events, the TDP forged an alliance with the Congress Party for the 2018 Telangana assembly elections. The alliance, consisting of the Congress, the TDP, and the Communist Party of India (CPI), formed the "Maha Kootami" (grand alliance) with the primary objective of defeating the TRS (now BRS) in the elections. This marked the first time that the TDP, which had been founded on an anti-Congress platform in 1982, joined hands with the Congress party. During this period, Naidu was advocating for a non-BJP coalition comprising regional parties with the support of Congress to make a significant impact in the upcoming parliamentary elections. This experiment faced a failure in the Telangana elections with K.Chandrashekar Rao's TRS winning by a big margin. As a result, the TDP and the Congress subsequently parted ways for the 2019 Andhra Pradesh assembly elections. The alliance with the Congress and its aftermath left a bitter outcome for Naidu, leading to a considerable erosion of his credibility due to the perceived flip-flop in alliances.

== Leader of the Opposition (2019-2024) ==
In the 2019 assembly and parliamentary elections, the ruling TDP was decisively defeated by the YSR Congress Party led by Y. S. Jagan Mohan Reddy. The YSRCP achieved a landslide victory by securing 151 seats in the assembly out of 175, while the TDP could manage 23 seats. In the Lok Sabha, the TDP won three seats, while the YSRCP secured the remaining 22 seats.

=== Corruption allegations and arrest ===
On 9 September 2023, Naidu was arrested by the Andhra Pradesh Crime Investigation Department (AP-CID), accused of misappropriation of public funds amounting to 371 crore INR. He was listed as accused number 37 in the case. On 10 September 2023, he appeared at the ACB court and the court remanded him in judicial custody for 14 days, for which he was moved to the Central Jail in Rajamahendravaram. After being in judicial custody for 52 days, he was released on bail on 31 October 2023. In February 2026, the Enforcement Directorate (ED) cleared N. Chandrababu Naidu of all charges in the skill development case.

== Fourth term as Chief Minister of Andhra Pradesh (2024-present) ==
Naidu was sworn in as the chief minister of Andhra Pradesh for a record fourth term, surpassing N. T. Rama Rao who had served as the chief minister of the state for four terms, on 12 June 2024 after the TDP in alliance with the BJP and the JSP won the 2024 state legislative assembly election in a landslide, garnering 164 out of 175 seats and defeating the YSR Congress Party led by Y. S. Jagan Mohan Reddy. He also again emerged as kingmaker of Third Modi government along with Nitish Kumar by winning 16 out 25 lok sabha seats in state.

He has vowed to revive Amaravati as the sole capital of Andhra Pradesh and said that he will rebuild the capital as soon as possible. Mr. Naidu said he would seek the Central government's cooperation to rebuild Amaravati and exuded confidence that the expected support would come. The Centre had provided capital gains exemption for all sales of land and released ₹1,500 crore of the approved ₹2,500 crore for Amaravati.

As of December 2024, it was reported by the Association for Democratic Reforms that he was the richest Chief Minister in India, with total assets of 932 crore.

== Business career ==
Heritage Foods Limited (HFL), a dairy enterprise, was incorporated by Naidu in 1992. The company went public in 1994. The annual turnover of Heritage Foods stood at INR 26,429 million in the financial year 2021–22. Currently, Nara Bhuvaneswari, Naidu's wife, holds the position of vice-chairperson & managing director, while Nara Brahmani, Naidu's daughter-in-law, serves as the executive director. Heritage has hundreds of outlets throughout Andhra Pradesh and Telangana and a significant presence across many states in the country. Heritage has also a renewable energy vertical which runs captive solar & wind power plants at 11 different locations. HFL comprises a solid portion of Naidu's current assets.

== Non-political initiatives ==
Chandrababu Naidu serves as the chairman and director of the Global Forum for Sustainable Transformation (GFST), an organisation he established in March 2020 in Hyderabad. It is positioned as a global not-for-profit and apolitical think tank, with the aim of promoting sustainability in economies and communities. In June 2023, GFST hosted a seminar on 'Deep Technologies' in Hyderabad. Among its projects is the development of Vision India@2047, aligning with India's 100th year of Independence. Naidu unveiled a vision document titled India@2047, authored by GFST, on 15 August 2023, in Visakhapatnam.

The NTR Memorial Trust was founded in 1997 by Chandrababu Naidu as a non-profit organisation. The Trust is involved in a variety of activities including initiatives like providing free education, offering blood transfusion facilities, conducting health camps, and supporting empowerment and livelihood programs. The Trust manages a blood bank and Thalassemia center in Hyderabad, as well as blood banks in Visakhapatnam and Tirupati. Additionally, it operates schools in Hyderabad and Challapalli (Krishna district), along with NTR Junior & Degree College for Women in Hyderabad. The Trust's day-to-day operations are overseen by Naidu's wife, Nara Bhuvaneswari, who serves as the managing trustee.

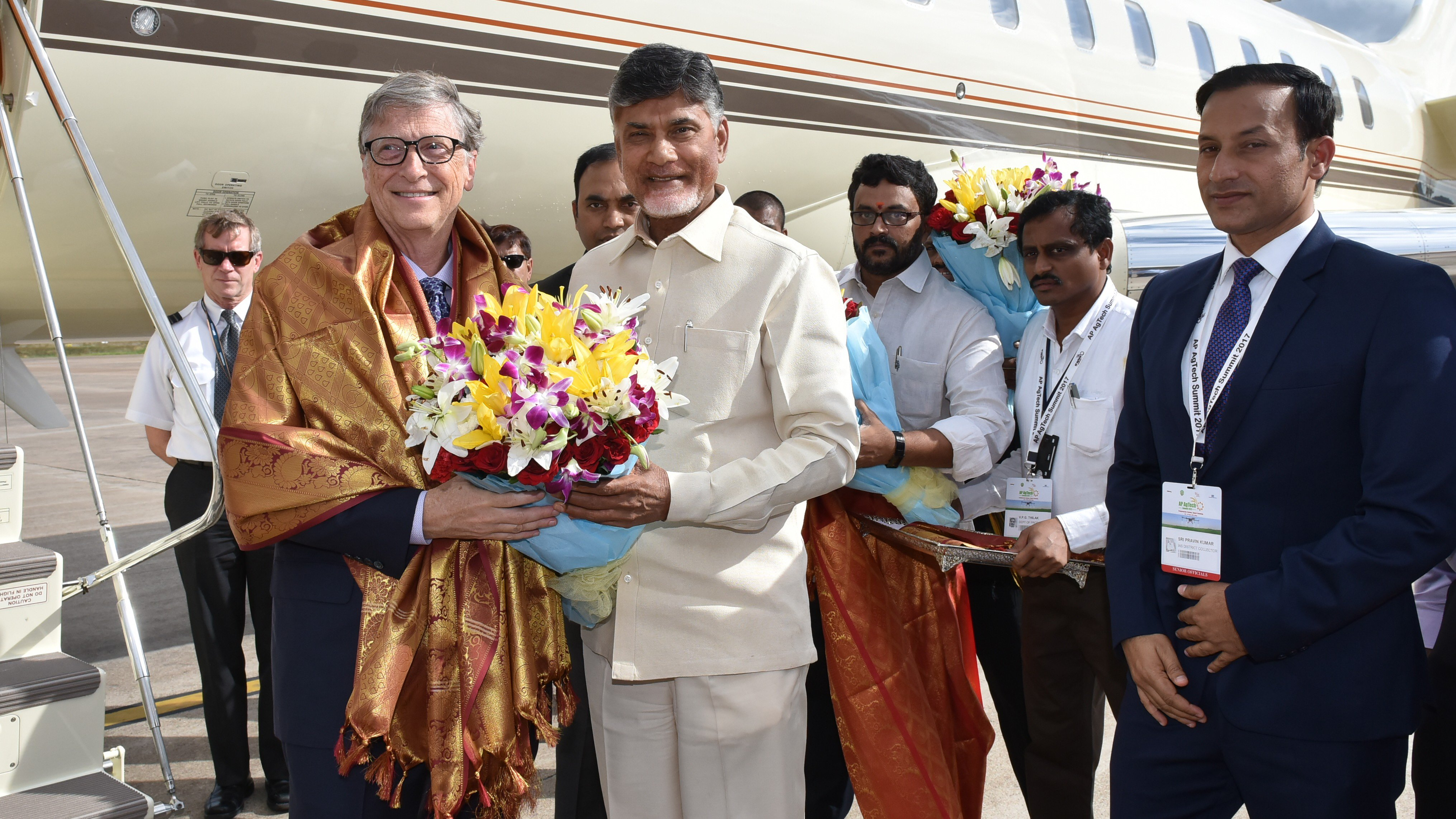
Bill Gates with Chandrababu Naidu in Visakhapatnam

Naidu faced severe criticism from various quarters for his policies. Both the Congress and left parties vehemently opposed his privatisation initiatives, labelling him as a symbol of World Bank policies. The power sector reforms implemented by him encountered strong resistance throughout the state. Naidu attracted criticism for allegedly prioritising information technology over the agriculture sector, which was a vital source of livelihood for a significant portion of the state's workforce. While the corporate industry hailed him as the "CEO of Andhra Pradesh Inc.," a substantial portion of the state's population perceived him as "anti-poor", which reflected in the loss of the 2004 elections. Amaravati, the new capital city that he set out to build in his latest term, ran into rough weather over various controversies.

== Legacy and recognition ==
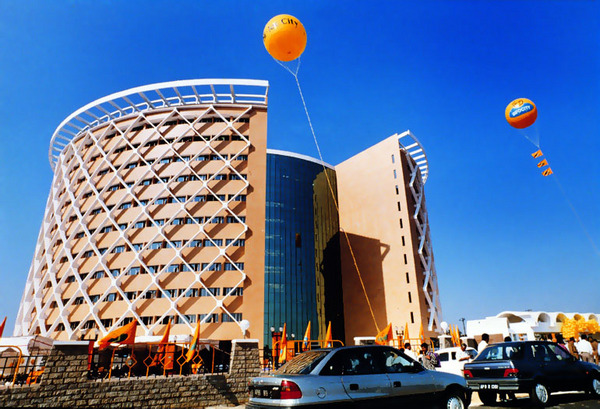
Cyber Towers

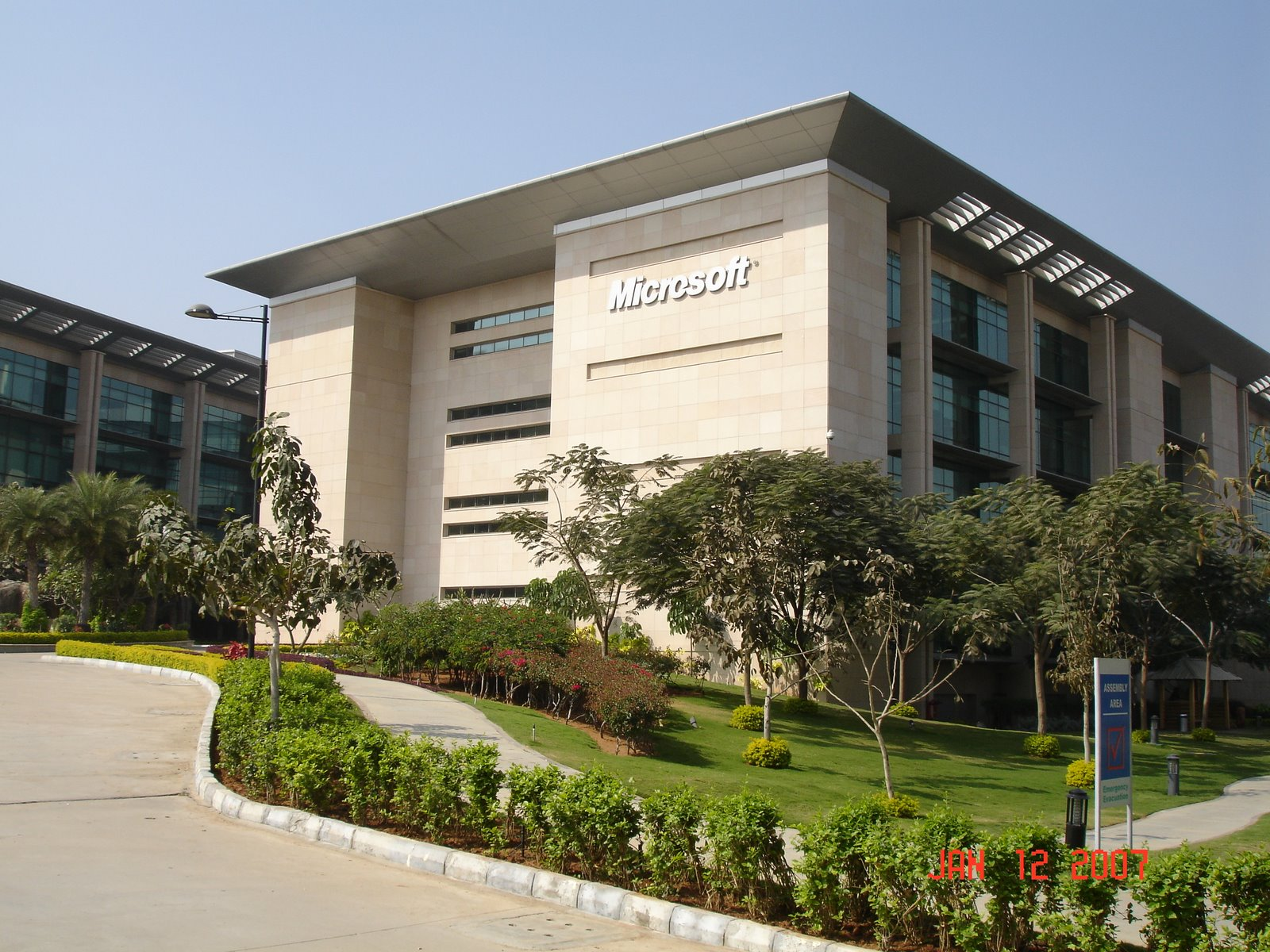
Microsoft R&D Hyderabad

Chandrababu Naidu was one of the most recognised Chief Ministers in the country during his nine-and-a-half-year tenure from 1995 to 2004. He was a strong supporter of liberalisation policies at the state level and was hailed by the western media as "one of the most promising local leaders not just in India but in the developing world." Andhra Pradesh was the first state in India to receive a direct World Bank loan for economic restructuring. Naidu was a regular participant at World Economic Forum meetings in Davos, Switzerland.

=== Development of Hyderabad ===
Naidu played a pivotal role in the establishment of HITEC City, Financial District, and Genome Valley in 1998 by the erstwhile combined Government of Andhra Pradesh, adjoining Cyberabad to the west of Hyderabad, propelling the information technology industry and enhancing modern infrastructure in Hyderabad, including the Rajiv Gandhi International Airport and the Indian School of Business (ISB). Beyond high-tech industry, his vision for the city's connectivity and public utility was evidenced by the launch of the Hyderabad Multi-Modal Transport System (MMTS) and the development of the HITEX Exhibition Center. Furthermore, he oversaw the creation of world class sporting infrastructure, most notably the Uppal Stadium (Rajiv Gandhi International Cricket Stadium), and to foster athletic talent, he provided land and support to Pullela Gopichand to set up his badminton academy.

Naidu's meetings with Bill Gates, the chairman of Microsoft, in New Delhi in 1997 initiated engagements that led Naidu to successfully persuade Microsoft to set up its India Development Centre in Hyderabad in 1998, the company’s first major R&D facility outside the United States, operating out of Cyber Towers until a dedicated campus was built later. This, followed by the visit of US President Bill Clinton in 2000, and Gates' visit to Hyderabad in 2002, played a significant role in enhancing his reputation.

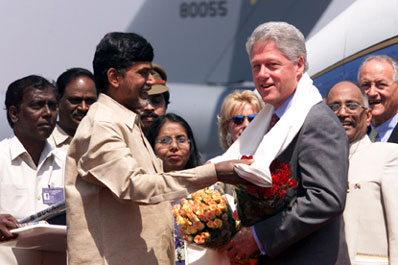
Chandrababu with President Clinton

=== Amaravati Capital ===
Following the bifurcation of the state. In his third term between 2014 and 2019, Naidu took up the ambitious project of building a greenfield capital city Amaravati. Andhra Pradesh also became the number one state in Ease of Doing Business (EoDB) Rankings during this period.

== Awards ==
Naidu has won a number of awards, including IT Indian of the Millennium from India Today, Business Person of the Year by The Economic Times, South Asian of the Year from Time Asia, Golden Peacock Award for leadership in Public Service & Economic Transformation, and membership in the World Economic Forum's Dream Cabinet. Naidu chaired the National IT Panel under the National Democratic Alliance (India) (NDA) government and was described as one of the "hidden seven" working wonders of the world by Profit (Oracle Corporation's monthly magazine). Naidu was offered an honorary professorship by US business school, the Kellogg School of Management in 2000. He was the Chairman of National Task Force on Micro-irrigation from Government of India, Ministry of Agriculture in 2003. He was the head of 13-member Committee of Chief Ministers to promote digital payment systems and financial inclusion in India which was constituted by federal government in 2016.

- The then Governor of Illinois, Jim Edgar, created a Naidu day on 24 September 1998 in his honour.
- Voted IT Indian of the Millennium in a poll by India Today and 20:20 Media.
- He was named South Asian of the Year in 1999 by Time magazine, US
- In 2001, he was described as one of the hidden "Seven working wonders around the world", by Profit, a monthly magazine published by Oracle Corporation, US.
- Business Person of the Year by Economic Times.
- Golden Peacock Award for Leadership in Public Service & Economic Transformation - 2017
- Global Agriculture Policy Leadership Award by Indian Council of Food and Agriculture (ICFA).
- The Pune-based organisation, Bharatiya Chatra Sansad, in partnership with MIT School of Governance, honoured him with Aadarsh Mukhyamantri Puraskar (Model CM Award) in its 6th annual session on 30 January 2016.
- Transformative Chief Minister Award in May 2017 by US-India Business Council (USIBC) at West Coast Summit in the Silicon Valley.

== Portrayals ==
- He was portrayed by Rana Daggubati in NTR: Kathanayakudu (2019) in a cameo role and its sequel NTR: Mahanayakudu (2019) with a much more substantial role.
- He was portrayed by Sritej in the Ram Gopal Varma film Lakshmi's NTR (2019) which follows the events of NTR: Mahanayakudu but is unrelated to the other 2 films, with a different cast and director.
- Aadhi Pinisetty portrayed as Kakarla Krishnama Naidu in the 2025 drama series Mayasabha: Rise of the Titans. The series is a fictionalized retelling of events based on the politics of Andhra Pradesh between the 1970s and 1995, drawing comparisons to the political careers of N. Chandrababu Naidu and Y.S. Rajasekhar Reddy.

== Electoral history ==
Election results
Year	Office	Constituency	Party	Votes	%	Opponent	Party	Votes	%	Result	Ref
1978	MLA	Chandragiri	Indian National Congress	35,092	44.23	Kongara Pattabhi Rama Chowdary	Janata Party	32,598	41.08	Won	
1983	MLA	Chandragiri	Indian National Congress	32,581	38.76	Medasani Venkatarama Naidu	Telugu Desam Party	50,010	59.49	Lost	
1989	MLA	Kuppam	Telugu Desam Party	50,098	52.65	B. R. Doraswamy Naidu	Indian National Congress	43,180	45.38	Won	
1994	MLA	Kuppam	Telugu Desam Party	81,210	75.49	R. Gopinath	Indian National Congress	24,622	22.89	Won	
1999	MLA	Kuppam	Telugu Desam Party	93,288	74.42	M. Subramanyam Reddy	Indian National Congress	27,601	22.02	Won	
2004	MLA	Kuppam	Telugu Desam Party	98,123	69.93	M. Subramanyam Reddy	Indian National Congress	38,535	27.46	Won	
2009	MLA	Kuppam	Telugu Desam Party	89,952	61.91	M. Subramanyam Reddy	Indian National Congress	43,886	30.21	Won	
2014	MLA	Kuppam	Telugu Desam Party	102,952	62.59	K. Chandramouli	YSR Congress Party	55,831	33.94	Won	
2019	MLA	Kuppam	Telugu Desam Party	100,146	55.18	K. Chandramouli	YSR Congress Party	69,424	38.25	Won	
2024	MLA	Kuppam	Telugu Desam Party	121,929	59.96	K. R. J. Bharath	YSR Congress Party	73,923	36.35	Won	

== Notes ==
Political offices
Preceded by N. T. Rama Rao	Chief Minister of Andhra Pradesh; 1 September 1995 – 14 May 2004	Succeeded by Y. S. Rajasekhara Reddy
Preceded by Kiran Kumar Reddy	Chief Minister of Andhra Pradesh; 8 June 2014 – 23 May 2019	Succeeded by Y. S. Jagan Mohan Reddy
Preceded by Y. S. Jagan Mohan Reddy	Chief Minister of Andhra Pradesh; 12 June 2014 – Present	Incumbent
