= Matinée idol =

Celebrity film or theatre star

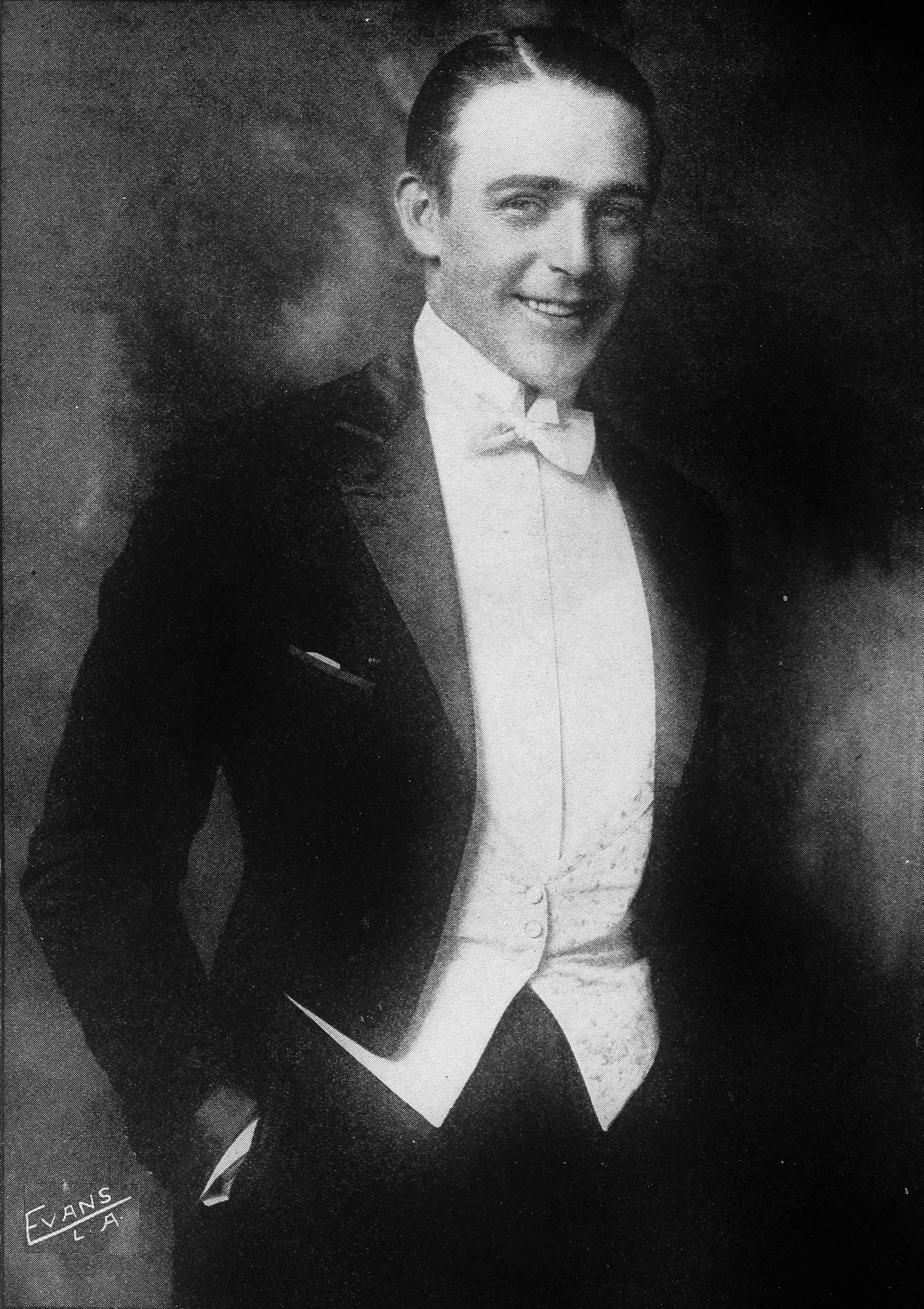
Wallace Reid is an example of a matinée idol. The original caption of this image from Picture-Play Magazine reads: "The only reason why they don’t let Wally play in dress-suit rôles all the time is that the casualties among the ladies would soon empty the picture houses. In fact, we feel that we’re toying with the fan hearts even to print this picture."

Matinée idol is a term used mainly to describe film or theatre stars who are adored to the point of adulation by their fans. The term almost exclusively refers to adult male actors.

Matinée idols often tend to play romantic and dramatic leading or secondary leading roles and are usually known for having good looks. The term can be taken as faintly pejorative in that it suggests the star's popularity came from the afternoon matinée performances, frequented more by women, rather than the "big picture" evenings and, hence, a less discriminating audience. Matinée idols often became the subject of parody during the height of their popularity, an example being Stan Laurel spoofing Rudolph Valentino in his film Mud and Sand.

Now a somewhat old-fashioned term and concept, the phenomenon reached its height from the 1920s to around the 1960s in Hollywood. "Teen idol" is a similar term, which often refers to youthful musicians as well as film actors. In today's Asia, “idols” pertain to a broader pop culture.

The term differs from "sex symbol", which refers to a star's sexual attractiveness in and outside of film more so than their romantic performances on the screen. However, a sex symbol may also be a matinée idol.

In Eugene O'Neill’s autobiographical play Long Day's Journey into Night, there is a speech where the character of the mother describes how as a convent-educated schoolgirl she became enamored with the dashing matinee idol modeled after O’Neill’s popular father.

== Famous matinée idols ==
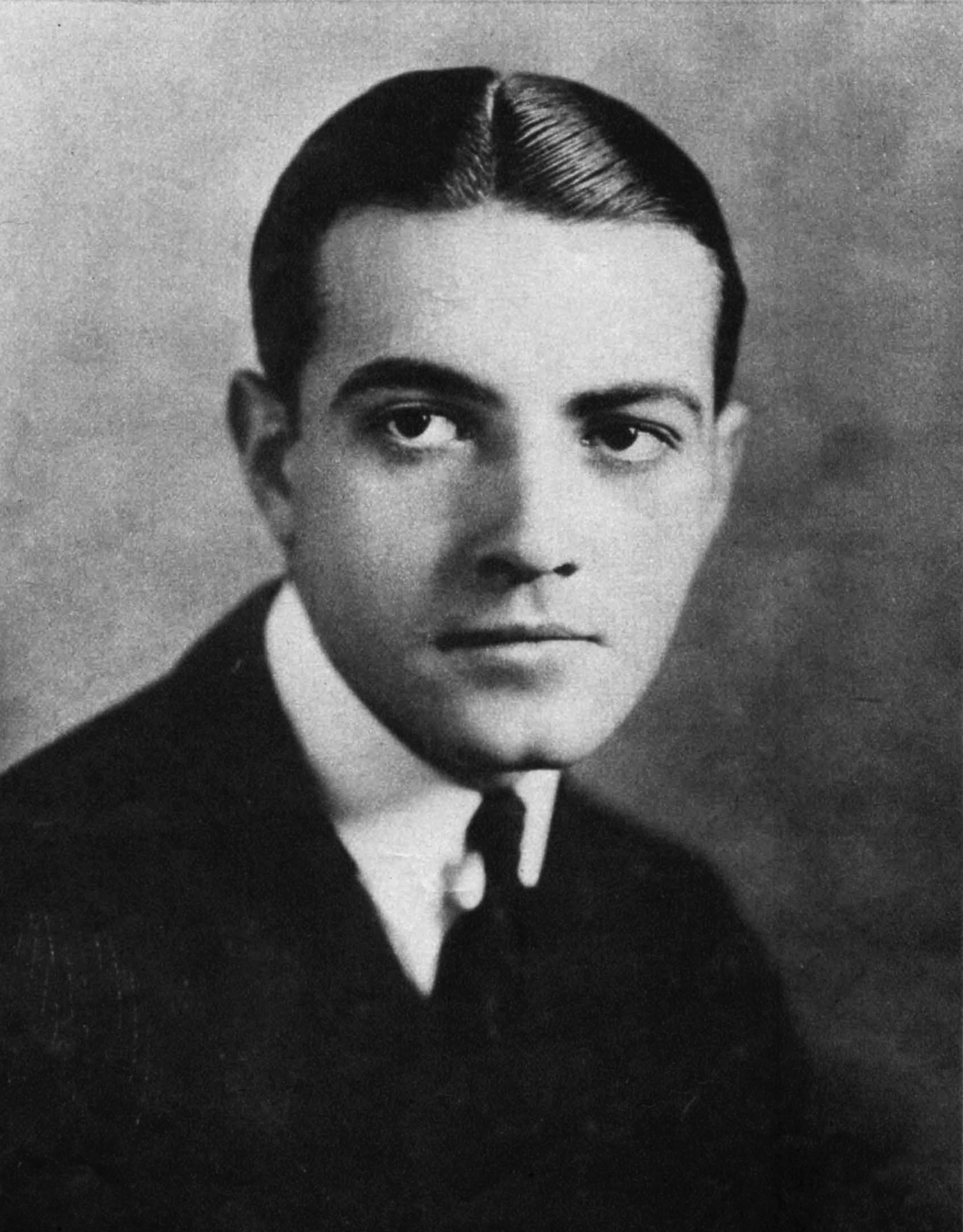
Photoplay named Richard Barthelmess the "idol of every girl in America" in the 1920s. An admirer wrote that "his wonderful black hair and soulful eyes are enough to make any young girl adore him" in 1921.

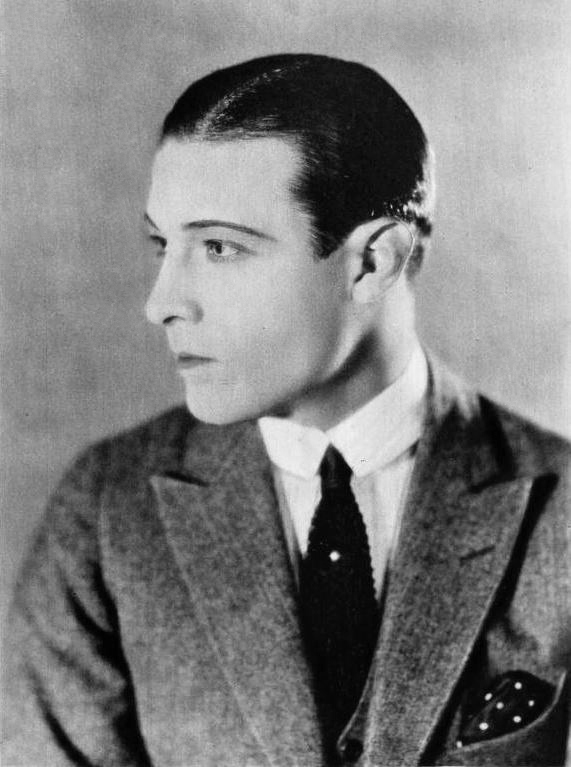
Rudolph Valentino is the epitome of a matinée idol.

=== 1910s–1920s ===
Matinée idols during these time were commonly referred to simply as "lovers". "Latin lovers", or actors who specialized in characters of Latin American or Romance European descent, became popular in the 1920s after Rudolph Valentino's famous performance as Julio Desnoyers in The Four Horsemen of the Apocalypse (1921). Other Latin lovers include Ramon Novarro, Antonio Moreno and Ricardo Cortez, although the latter was actually a Jew named Jacob Krantz who passed as Latin to capitalize on the trope's popularity.

- Sessue Hayakawa (first Asian idol to become popular in America)
- Antonio Moreno
- Wallace Reid
- Richard Barthelmess
- Thomas Meighan
- Richard Dix
- Douglas Fairbanks
- Ramon Novarro
- Rudolph Valentino
- Ivor Novello
- Reginald Denny
- Adolphe Menjou
- John Gilbert
- Ronald Colman
- Ricardo Cortez
- Charles de Rochefort
- William Haines
- Lorenzo Tucker

=== 1930s ===
- Errol Flynn
- Lew Ayres
- Robert Taylor
- Tyrone Power

=== 1940s ===
- Van Johnson
- Guy Madison

=== 1950s ===
- Dirk Bogarde
- Akkineni Nageswara Rao
- N. T. Rama Rao

=== Sports ===
- During the November 15, 2009, Sunday Night Football game between the New England Patriots and the Indianapolis Colts, Bob Costas used the term to describe New England Patriots' superstar quarterback Tom Brady. The Colts went on to win by a score of 35–34.

== Bibliography ==
- Williams, Michael. Ivor Novello: Screen Idol. BFI, 2003.
