= Thiruvalluvar Temple, Tiruchuli =

Tiruchuli Thiruvalluvar Temple is a Hindu temple at Periya Pudupatti in Tiruchuli, Tamil Nadu, India, dedicated to poet-saint Valluvar, the author of the Kural text. It is one of the few temples in the state of Tamil Nadu dedicated to Valluvar. Valluvar is worshiped as the 64th nayanmar of the Shaivite tradition and is taken in annual procession.

== History ==
The Thiruvalluvar temple at Tiruchuli was constructed in 1929. Initial worship began with poojas performed to a picture of Valluvar, to whom a statue was later sculpted.

== The temple ==
The temple is located near Periya Pudupatti village of Tiruchuli near Aruppukkottai in Virudhunagar district of Tamil Nadu.

The villagers of Periya Pudupatti regard saint Valluvar as a common deity and have the tradition of worshiping him before initiating any new venture such as conducting a wedding.

Annual festivals at the temple include the Thiruvalluvar Day in January and the full moon day in the Tamil month of Maasi (February–March). Customs during these festivals include making vows and redeeming them by carrying pots of sprouted lentils (mullaipari) on their heads. Pongal is cooked during these festivals and Valluvar's idol is taken in a procession as the 64th nayanmar of the Shaivite tradition, after which the dish is offered to Valluvar. The pujas are performed according to Hindu tradition with camphor, garlands, and lighting of lamps. The chief worshipers in the Periya Pudupatti village are the Valluvar community, who are into fortune-telling. Nevertheless, people of all religions visit the temple and make offerings.

== Festivals ==
The temple conducts the annual guru pooja during the Tamil month of Maasi (February–March), on the death anniversary of Valluvar. Locals claim that this is the only temple that conducts a guru pooja for Valluvar.

== See also ==
- Thiruvalluvar Temple, Mylapore
