= Legal system of ancient Tamilakam =

Ancient legal system

The legal systems of ancient Tamilakam were instituted by the state. It was governed by the Tamil principles of: Aram, Maram, Pazhi, and Nan. If a monarch failed in the act of aram, it would then bring eternal blame (pali) from their own subjects. If, on the other hand, they failed in the act of maram, it would be shame (nan) to them.

There were Aramkuru Avaiams in the capital cities of the Chera, the Chola and the Pandyas.

== The monarch ==
The king was the final court of appeal. A Pandya king mentions that he should be put into the boiling water for having appointed an unscrupulous person as judge in his court of justice. From this statement of the king it is possible to infer that the kings used to appoint Judges. It is said that a certain King transacted justice even while in a bath.

=== Virtue and Valour ===
Although Aram is normally translated as virtue and equated to the Sanskrit Dharma, and because of the interaction between them it has been impossible to draw a distinction between them. Aram co-existed with another concept of Maram; ara is used with reference to virtue, justice, actions taken with due consideration of context and custom; maram, on the other hand, is used to denote valour, courage, wrath, hatred, killing and strength. Hence, it was quite different from the concept Dharma. Maram got degenerated in its usage in course of time from valour into a vice.

As such the distinction in Aram and Maram was a part of a dynamic system. It may be compared to the distinction between martial virtues and philosophical virtues in China.

=== Aram as Justice ===
The cardinal principle of law in that divine work is righteousness or aram. Persons who administered justice during the Sangam period were governed by the principles of equity embodied in the word, aram. Aram has a great latitude of meaning. Eight meanings are given to it as shown above.

In the chapter called Chengonmai of Tirukkural, Tiruvalluvar conceptualises that:

Government has to examine the crimes, which may be committed to show no favor to anyone, and to inflict such punishment as may be wisely resolved on. Kural 541

== Courts of Law ==
The courts had various names including: Aram Vazhangum Manram (The Council which safeguards Justice), Ulaka aravai (Seat of World Justice) and Aramkurum avaiyam (Assembly that speaks Justice). The name was Sanskritised into Dharmasanam (Place of Dharma) after the Sangam period.

== Trials by Jury ==
Although the monarch was the supreme arbiter in all civil and criminal cases, the administration of Justice was devolved to Judges. The presiding Judge in each Court wore a peculiar headgear by which they were distinguished from other officers of the Court. Justice was administered free of charge to the suitors; but the punishments were very severe and hence crimes were rare.

The members of the jury never erred from the path of etiquette. They went into the details of the cases that came before them, studied them well arrived at the truth and gave their verdict. Those who served as juries were disinterested persons without likes or dislikes and without fear or favour. They maintained equanimity. They were known for honesty and integrity.

== Trials by ordeal ==
Sometimes peculiar methods were used to resolve cases. A particular method of trial by ordeal was to call upon the plaintiff to thrust his hand into a pot containing a cobra. If the cobra bit him, he was guilty and he was sentenced: if the cobra did not bite him, he was found innocent.

== Witnesses ==
When a certain case was presented to the court, one method of enquiry was by the examination of witnesses, there were then, as now, both false and true witnesses. The Sirupancamulam condemns the witness who deposes to an untruth. The false witness is mentioned as one among the six offenders of a State. The other five are pseudo-Sannyasins, housewives loose in morals, disloyal ministers, adulterers and tale-bearers. In different places of the Silappathikaram, deposing as false witness is treated as a great crime. Thus, we see how carefully justice was administered and the dignity of law and order was maintained.

== Legal code ==
There are references to the Book implying there was a Tamil legal code, but such a document has not yet been discovered. Although, some historians suggest it was the Tirukkural; this, however, is controversial.

== Specific cases ==
An interesting instance is that of a young lover who has gained the love of a woman but not the approval of her parents. The lover contemplates to lake the case to the Aramkuru Avaiam. In case a lover deserted a girl after having enjoyed her, and refused to marry her, the girl could bring the matter to the notice of the avai and it was the duty of avai to ascertain the truth and punish the offender. In the epic Cilapatikaram, Kovalan is infamously killed without trial by the Pandyan Kingdom.
