= Thiruvalluvar =

Tamil poet and philosopher

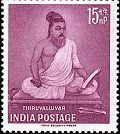
- Thiruvalluvar on an Indian stamp (1960)
- Born: Uncertain^{[a]} Birthplace unknown; probably Mylapore, Chennai
- Other names: Valluvar; Mudharpaavalar; Deivappulavar; Maadhaanupangi; Naanmuganaar; Naayanaar; Deivaparaiyar; Poyyirpulavar; Dhevar; Perunaavalar
- Spouse: Vasuki

Philosophical work
- Region: Tondai Nadu of Tamil Nadu
- School: Indian philosophy
- Notable students: Elelasingan
- Language: Old Tamil
- Main interests: Ethics; ahimsa; nonkilling; justice; virtue; politics; education; family; friendship; love
- Notable works: Kural
- Notable ideas: Secular ethics and morality

Thiruvalluvar (commonly known as Valluvar) was an Indian philosopher and a Tamil-language poet of the post-Sangam era. He is best known as the author of the Tirukkuṟaḷ, a collection of couplets on ethics, political and economic matters, and love. The text is considered an exceptional and widely cherished work of Tamil literature.

Almost no authentic information is available about Valluvar, states Kamil Zvelebil – a scholar of Tamil literature. His life and likely background are variously inferred from his literary works by different biographers. There are unauthentic hagiographic and legendary accounts of Valluvar's life, and all major Indian religions, as well as Christian missionaries of the 19th century, have tried to claim him as secretly inspired (crypto-) or originally belonging to their tradition. Little is known with certainty about his family background, religious affiliation, or birthplace. He is believed to have lived at least in the town of Mylapore (a neighbourhood of the present-day Chennai), and his floruit is dated variously from fourth century BCE to early fifth century CE, based on the traditional accounts and the linguistic analyses of his writings. Kamil Zvelebil infers the Tirukkuṟaḷ and Valluvar are best dated to around 500 CE.

Valluvar has influenced a wide range of scholars down the ages since his time across the ethical, social, political, economical, religious, philosophical, and spiritual spheres. He has long been venerated as a great sage, and his literary works a classic of Tamil culture.

== Life ==
There is negligible authentic information available about Valluvar's life. In fact, neither his actual name nor the original title of his work can be determined with certainty. Tirukkuṟaḷ itself does not name its author. Monsieur Ariel, a French translator of his work in the 19th century, famously said it is "the book without a name by an author without a name". The name Thiruvalluvar (lit. Saint Valluvar) was first mentioned in the later text Tiruvalluva Maalai.

The speculations about Valluvar's life are largely inferred from his work Tirukkuṟaḷ and other Tamil literature that quote him. According to Zvelebil, Valluvar was "probably a learned Jain with eclectic leanings and intimate acquaintance with the early works of Tamil classical period and some knowledge of the Sanskrit legal and didactic texts (subhashita)".

=== Traditional biographies ===
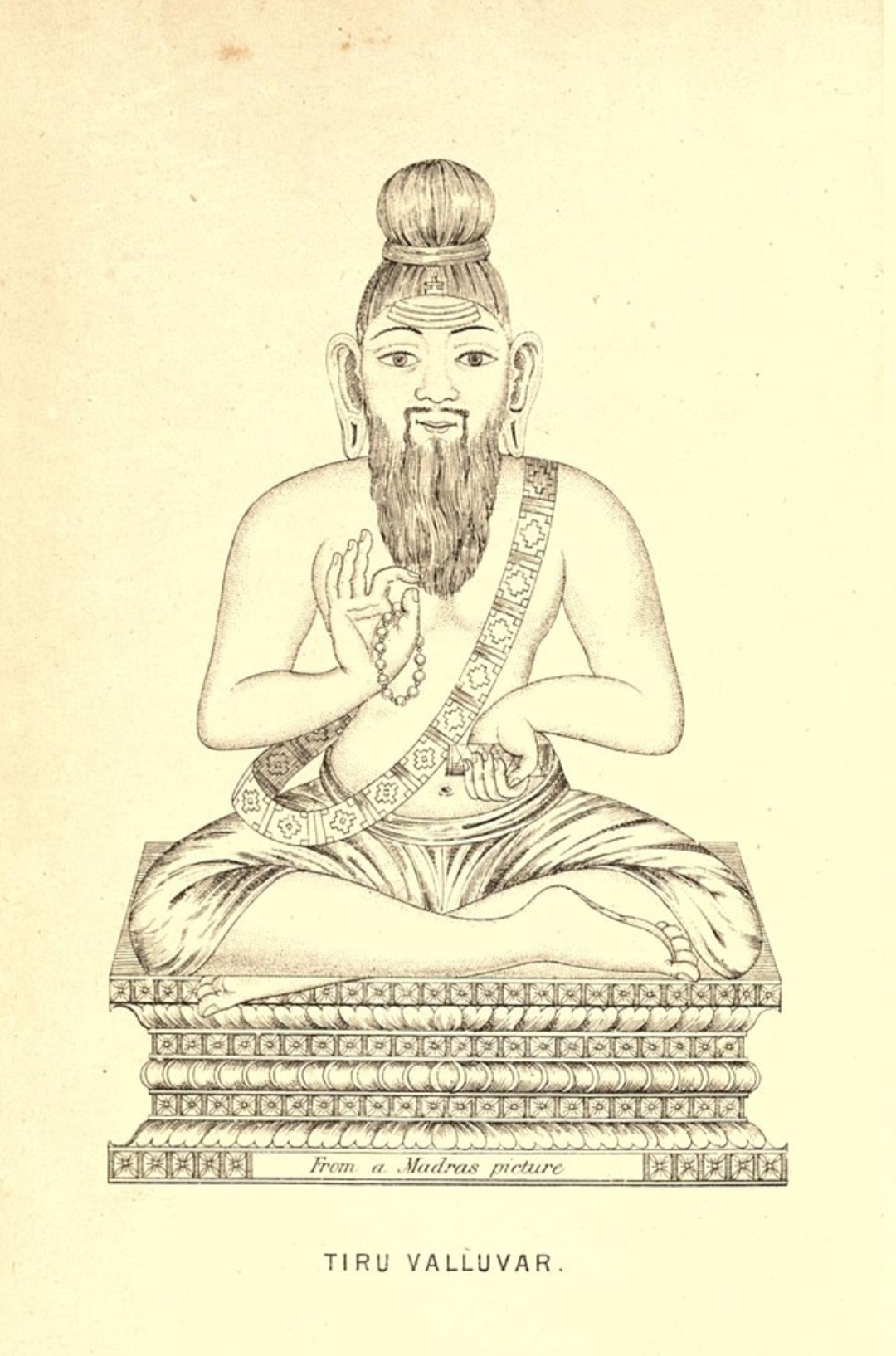
Traditional Shaivite portrait of Valluvar

The Shaivite Tamil text Tiruvalluva Maalai contains the earliest known textual reference to the legend of Valluvar, but it remains undated. (Note: Blackburn suggests tenth century, but expresses his doubt with a question mark.) This text attracted attention in the colonial era because an early 19th-century commentary referred to him as "Valluvan" (Valluvar) whose text presented the "esoteric wisdom of the Vedas to the world". The original text relates the Kural in the context of Sanskrit literature. The commentary includes the gloss that Valluvan was "born in a low caste", but the original text does not. According to Stuart Blackburn, this comment appears to be extra-textual and possibly based on the oral tradition. No other pre-colonial textual sources have been found to support any legends about the life of Valluvar. Starting around the early 19th century, numerous legends on Valluvar in Indian languages and English were published.

Various claims have been made regarding Valluvar's family background and occupation in the colonial era literature, all inferred from selective sections of his text or hagiographies published since the colonial era started in Tamil Nadu. One traditional version claims that he was a Paraiyar weaver. Another theory is that he must have been from the agricultural caste of Vellalars because he extols agriculture in his work. Another version states he was an outcast, born to a Pariayar woman and Brahmin father. Mu Raghava Iyengar speculated that "valluva" in his name is a variation of "vallabha", the designation of a royal officer. S. Vaiyapuri Pillai suggested Valluvar derived his name from "Valluvan" (a Paraiyar caste of royal drummers) and theorized that he was "the chief of the proclaiming boys analogous to a trumpet-major of an army". H. A. Stuart, in his Census Report of 1891, claimed that Valluvans were a priestly class among the Paraiyars and served as priests during Pallava reign, and similarly Robert Caldwell, J. H. A. Tremenheere and Edward Jewitt Robinson, too, claimed that Valluvar was a Paraiyar. Valluvar was likely married to a woman named Vasuki and lived in Mylapore. According to traditional accounts, Valluvar died on the day of Anusham in the Tamil month of Vaikasi.

The poem Kapilar Agaval, purportedly written by Kapilar, describes its author as a brother of Valluvar. It states that they were children of a Pulaya mother named Adi and a Brahmin father named Bhagwan. The poem claims that the couple had seven children, including three sons (Valluvar, Kapilar, and Atikaman) and four sisters (Avvai, Uppai, Uruvai, and Velli). However, this legendary account is spurious. Kamil Zvelebil dates Kapilar Agaval to 15th century CE, based on its language. Various biographies mention the name of Valluvar's wife as Vasuki, but such details are of doubtful authenticity.

The traditional biographies are not only inconsistent, but they also contain claims about Valluvar that are not credible. Along with various versions of his birth circumstances, many state he went to a mountain and met the legendary Agastya and other sages. During his return journey, he sits under a tree whose shadow sits still over Valluvar and does not move the entire day, he kills a demon, performs miracles such as causing floods and making them retreat, he touches a grounded ship which miraculously then floats and sails off, his bride Vasuki cooks sand which comes out as boiled rice, and many more. Scholars consider these and all associated aspects of these hagiographic stories to be fiction and ahistorical, a feature common to "international and Indian folklore". The alleged low birth, high birth, and being a pariah in the traditional accounts are also doubtful.

By 1904, Purnalingam Pillai, an ardent Dravidianist, had analyzed and called these traditional accounts and stories as myths. Pillai's analysis and arguments are robust, according to Blackburn. These fictional accounts of Valluvar's life have become popular because aspects of the traditional accounts were selectively accepted by Christian missionaries such as George Pope and other European writers, were widely published and then became a required reading about Tamil history.

== Date ==
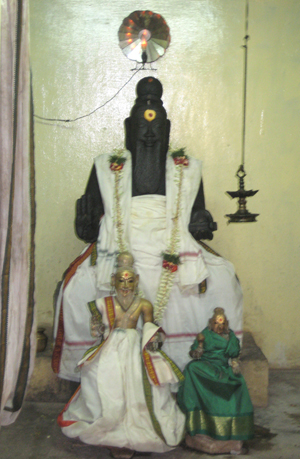
Statue of Valluvar in the Thiruvalluvar Temple, Mylapore

The exact date of Valluvar is unclear. His work Tirukkuṟaḷ has been dated variously from 300 BCE to about the sixth century CE. According to traditional accounts, it was the last work of the third Sangam and was subjected to a divine test (which it passed). The scholars who believe this tradition, such as Somasundara Bharathiar and M. Rajamanickam, date the text to as early as 300 BCE. Historian K. K. Pillay assigned it to the early first-century CE. These early dates such as 300 BCE to 1 BCE are unacceptable and not supported by evidence within the text, states Zvelebil. The diction and grammar of the Tirukkuṟaḷ, his indebtedness to some earlier Sanskrit sources, suggest that he lived after the "early Tamil bardic poets", but before Tamil bhakti poets era.

In 1959, S. Vaiyapuri Pillai assigned the work to around or after the sixth-century CE. His proposal is based on the evidence that the Tirukkuṟaḷ contains a large proportion of Sanskrit loan words, shows awareness and indebtedness to some Sanskrit texts best dated to the first half of the first-millennium CE, and the grammatical innovations in the language of Tirukkuṟaḷ. (Note: For examples of Sanskrit loan words, see Zvelebil's The Smile of Murugan.) Pillai published a list of 137 Sanskrit loan words in Tirukkuṟaḷ. Later scholars Thomas Burrow and Murray Barnson Emeneau show that 35 of these are of Dravidian origin, and not Sanskrit loan words. Zvelebil states that an additional few have uncertain etymology and future studies may prove those to be Dravidian. The 102 remaining loan words from Sanskrit are "not negligible", and some of the teachings in the Tirukkuṟaḷ states Zvelebil are "undoubtedly" based on the then extant Sanskrit works such as the Arthashastra and Manusmriti (also called the Manavadharmasastra).

According to Kamil Zvelebil, the Tirukkuṟaḷ does not belong to the (Sangam) period. In the 1970s, Zvelebil dated the text to somewhere between 450 and 500 CE. (Note: Zvelebil gives several date ranges. In 1973, he suggested 450–550 CE. In 1974 and 1975 publications, he narrowed that to 450–500 CE.) His estimate is based on the dates of Tamil texts with similar Tamil language features, (Note: An example would be the use of the suffix -kal for both nouns of the higher and lower class. Another example is the frequent use of condition suffix -el, a feature absent in early Tamil literature and common by about the fifth-century.) and by placing it after some of the Tamil and Sanskrit treatises that are evidenced in the Tirukkuṟaḷ. Zvelebil notes that the text features several grammatical innovations, that are absent in the older Sangam literature. The text also features a higher number of Sanskrit loan words compared with these older texts. According to Zvelebil, besides being part of the ancient Tamil literary tradition, the author was also a part of the "one great Indian ethical, didactic tradition", as a few of his verses are "undoubtedly" translations of the verses in Sanskrit classics.

In the 19th century and early 20th century, European writers and missionaries variously dated the text and Valluvar to between 400 and 1000 CE. According to Blackburn, the "current scholarly consensus" dates the text and the author to approximately 500 CE.

In January 1935, the Tamil Nadu government officially recognized 31 BCE as the year of Valluvar. As suggested by Maraimalai Adigal, the Valluvar Year was added to the calendar. Thus, the Valluvar year is calculated by adding 31 to any year of the common era.

== Birthplace ==
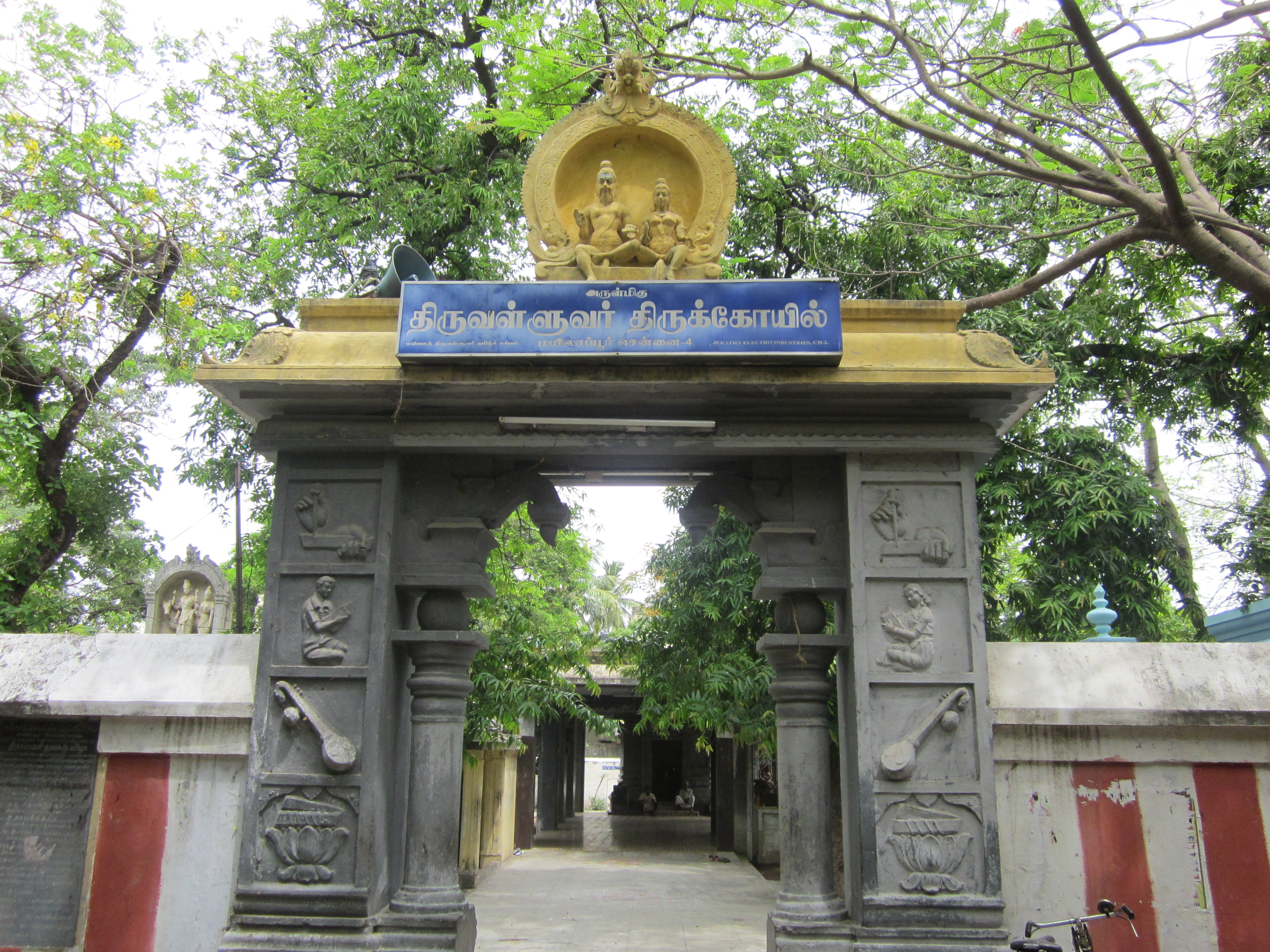
A temple for Valluvar in Mylapore

As with most other details about Valluvar, the exact place of his birth remains uncertain. Valluvar is believed to have lived in Madurai and later in the town of Mayilapuram or Thirumayilai (present-day Mylapore in Chennai). There are also accounts that say he was born in Mayilapuram and later moved to Madurai in order to publish his work at the royal court. The poem Kapilar Akaval states that Valluvar was born on the top of an oil-nut or iluppai tree (Madhuca indica) in Mayilapuram, while verse 21 of the Tiruvalluva Maalai claims that he was born in Madurai.

In 2005, a three-member research team from the Kanyakumari Historical and Cultural Research Centre (KHCRC) claimed that Valluvar was born in Thirunayanarkurichi, a village in present-day Kanyakumari district. Their claim was based on an old Kani tribal leader who told them that Valluvar was a king who ruled the "Valluvanadu" territory in the hilly tracts of the Kanyakumari district.^{[b]}

== Religion ==
Valluvar is generally thought to have belonged to either Jainism or Hinduism. Hinduism, Jainism, and Buddhism were the three religions that flourished in the Indian subcontinent during the time of Valluvar. Early 19th-century writers proposed that Valluvar may have been a Jain. The 1819 translation by Francis Whyte Ellis mentions that the Tamil community debates whether Valluvar was a Jain or Hindu. Valluvar's treatment of the concept of ahimsa or non-violence, which is the principal concept in both Jainism and Hinduism, bolsters this argument. If Valluvar was indeed a Jain, it raises questions about the source of the traditional Valluvar legends and the mainstream colonial debate about his birth.

=== Jain claim ===
Kamil Zvelebil believes that the ethics of the Tirukkuṟaḷ reflects the Jain moral code, particularly moral vegetarianism (couplets 251–260), and ahimsa, that is, "abstention from killing" (couplets 321–333); scholars also note the articulation of Thiruvalluvar in one of the couplets of Tirukkuṟaḷ on the liberation (Moksha) from the cycle of rebirth (Saṃsāra) through living a life with a compassionate heart. Zvelebil states that the text contains epithets for God that reflect Jain ideology:

- Malarmicaiyekinan (Couplet 3), "he who walked upon the [lotus] flower"
- Aravaliyantanan (Couplet 8), "the Brahmin [who had] the wheel of dharma"
- Enkunattan (Couplet 9), "one of the eight-fold qualities"

These, according to Zvelebil, are "very much Jaina-like" because the arhat is seen as "standing on the lotus", or where the arhat in the Jain conception is the god with the lotus as his vehicle. There are exceptions, adds Zvelebil, when Valluvar treats this God with epithets found in the Hindu text Manusmriti (1.6), that is, "the Primeval Lord" and "the King, the Monarch". Zvelebil states that his proposal is supported by the 13th-century Hindu scholar Parimelalhagar, who wrote a commentary on the Kural text, who admitted that these epithets are "very well applicable" to a Jain Arhat. However, according to P. S. Sundaram – a scholar who has translated the text in the late 20th century, states there are some indications in the Kural of Valluvar having been a Jain, but Parimelalhagar's commentary explicitly states that there are no heretical beliefs in the texts either.

Some other epithets mentioned in the text also reflect a "strong ascetic flavour" of Jainism in Zvelebil's view:

- Ventutal ventamai ilan (Couplet 4), "he who has neither desire nor aversion"
- Porivayil aintavittan (Couplet 6), "he who has destroyed the gates of the five senses"

Zvelebil further states that Valluvar seems to have been "cognizant of the latest developments" in Jainism. Zvelebil theorizes that he was probably "a learned Jain with eclectic leanings", who was well-acquainted with the earlier Tamil literature and also had knowledge of the Sanskrit texts. Nevertheless, early Digambara or Svetambara Jaina texts do not mention Valluvar. The first claim of Valluvar as an authority appears in a 16th-century Jain text, about 1,100 years after his life.

Peterson also believed that Valluvar must be a jain ascetic. During Kalabhadra period, Jain scholars formed an academy in Madurai and wrote texts in Sanskrit, Pali, Prakrit, and Tamil. These include classics such as the Tirukkural that condemns meat-eating (one of the cornerstones of Jainism as opposed to Hinduism as Brahmin poets like Kapilar are described to be meat-eaters in the Sangam literature),

According to Kovaimani and Nagarajan the jain tamil jain text Naladiyar is next only to the Tirukkural in fame among the Tamil literary works. Along with the Tirukkural, it is one of the first books published in Tamil, when it came to print from palm leaf manuscripts for the first time in 1812. There is an old Tamil proverb praising both the text that says "Nālaṭiyār and the Tirukkural are very good in expressing human thoughts just as the twigs of the banyan and the neem trees are good in maintaining the teeth."

According to A. Chakravarthy Nainar,the two great works, Kural and Naladiyar, were the works of Jaina teachers. The Jaina tradition associates the work with Kunda Kunda Acharya, also known as Elachariyar in the Tamil region, the chief of the Southern Pataliputra Dravidian Sanghaat, who lived around the latter half of the first century BCE and the former half of the first century CE.

In his book, Professor Shulman adverted to “a widespread scholarly view that Thiruvalluvar was a Jain”. Like his work, he “effectively belongs to everyone”, the scholar added. In respect of Thiruvalluvar’s religion, Sastri, who extolled Tirukkural as a “comprehensive manual of ethics, polity and love”, was emphatic in saying that “the author was most probably a learned Jaina divine and his close acquaintance with the works of Manu, Kautilya and Vatsyayana is unmistakable”.

=== Hindu claim ===
According to other scholars, Valluvar's writings suggest that he belonged to Hinduism. Hindu teachers have mapped his teachings in Tirukkuṟaḷ to the teachings found in Hindu texts. While the text extols the virtue of non-violence, it also dedicates many of 700 porul couplets to various aspects of statecraft and warfare in a manner similar to Arthasastra: "An army has a duty to kill in battle, and a king must execute criminals for justice." This non-mystic realism and the readiness for just war teachings are similar to those found in Hinduism. According to M. S. Purnalingam Pillai, Valluvar has not condemned Saiva Siddhanta or its principles anywhere in the text, which he says is the crucial test to be applied in determining his religion. Matthieu Ricard believes Valluvar belonged to the Shaivite tradition of South India.

The three parts that the Kural literature is divided into, namely, aram (virtue), porul (wealth) and inbam (love), aiming at attaining vitu (ultimate salvation), follow, respectively, the first three of the four foundations of Hinduism, namely, dharma, artha, kama and moksha. According to Norman Cutler, the prodigious 13th-century Tamil scholar Parimelalakar – who wrote the most influential commentary on Tirukkuṟaḷ – interprets the layout and focus on the Valluvar to be synonymous with the Sanskritic concept of Puruṣārtha (the objectives of human life). According to Parimelalakar, the Valluvar text covers primarily and directly the first three aspects, but not vitu (moksha, release). The text, however, does cover turavaram (renunciation) – the means to attain spiritual release. Thus, vitu is indirectly discussed in the Kural text.

In the introductory chapters of the Kural, Valluvar cites Indra, the king of heaven, to exemplify the virtue of conquest over one's senses. According to Tamil Hindu scholars such as Parimelalakar, other concepts and teachings found in Valluvar's text and also found in Hindu texts include Vedas, gods (Trimurti), sattva, guṇa, munis and sadhus (renouncers), rebirth, affirmation of a primordial God, among others. According to Purnalingam Pillai, who is known for his critique of Brahminism, a rational analysis of the Valluvar's work suggests that he may be a Hindu. Similarly, J. J. Glazov, a Tamil literature scholar and the translator of the Kural text into the Russian language, sees "Thiruvalluvar as a Hindu by faith", according to a review by Kamil Zvelebil.

Valluvar's mentioning of God Vishnu in couplets 610 and 1103 and Goddess Lakshmi in couplets 167, 408, 519, 565, 568, 616, and 617 hints at the Vaishnavite beliefs of Valluvar. Shaivites have characterised Valluvar as a devotee of Shiva and have installed his images in their temples. Further, in some teachings about politics, economics, and love, Valluvar undoubtedly has translated into Tamil the verses found in Sanskrit texts such as Arthasastra.

According to Stuart Blackburn, the Tirukkuṟaḷ is not a bhakti text, and it neither satirizes nor eulogizes Brahmins or ritualism. It is a practical, pragmatic text and "certainly not a Shaivite or Vaishnavite" text. According to Norman Cutler, Tirukkuṟaḷ is an aphoristic text and the influential Parimelalakar's commentary interprets it within his own context, grounded in Hindu concepts and theological agenda. His elegantly written interpretations have made his commentary a Tamil classic and maneuvered Valluvar as consistent within the framework of Parimelalakar's Hinduism. His commentary on Valluvar's teachings reflects both the cultural values and textual values in the 13th-to-14th-century Tamil Nadu. Valluvar's text can be interpreted and maneuvered in other ways.

=== Other religious claims ===
Despite scholars suggesting that Valluvar is either a Jain or a Hindu, owing to the Kural text's non-denominational nature, almost every religious group in India, including Christianity, has claimed the work and its author as one of their own. However, these claims are not supported academically and are constantly refuted by scholars. For example, the Christian claims have cropped up only after the colonial missionaries came to India. The Tamil Scholar Mu. Varadarajan suggests Valluvar must have "practised religious eclecticism, maintained unshakeable faith in dharma but should have rejected religious symbols and superstitious beliefs."

Buddhism

The Dalit activist Iyothee Thass, who converted to Buddhism, claimed that Valluvar was originally called "Tiruvalla Nayanar", and was a Buddhist. Thass further contended that the name "Tirukkuṟaḷ" is a reference to the Buddhist Tripiṭaka. He claims that Valluvar's book was originally called Tirikural ("Three Kurals"), because it adhered to the three Buddhist scriptures Dhamma Pitaka, Sutta Pitaka, and Vinaya Pitaka. According to Thass, the legend that presents Valluvar as the son of a Brahmin father and a Paraiyar mother was invented by Brahmins in 1825, who wanted to Hinduise a Buddhist text. According to Geetha, the deconstruction and reinterpretation of the history of Valluvar into a Buddhist framework by Thass shows the significance and appropriation of Valluvar's text by all sections of Tamil society.

Christianity

The 19th-century Christian missionary George Uglow Pope claimed that Valluvar must have come in contact with Christian teachers such as Pantaenus of Alexandria, imbibed Christian ideas and peculiarities of Alexandrian teachers and then wrote the "wonderful Kurral" with an echo of the "Sermon on the Mount". According to Pope, Valluvar must have lived in the ninth century CE because that would fit the historical chronology to his theory. Nevertheless, scholars, including Zvelebil, J. M. Nallaswamy Pillai, Sundaram Pillai, Kanakasabai Pillai, and Krishnaswamy Aiyengar, and even missionaries such as John Lazarus refute such claims. Pillai declares Pope's claim as "an absurd literary anachronism" and says that the first two books of the Kural, in particular, are "a stumbling block which can browbeat the most sublime ideas of Christian morality." According to John Lazarus, the Kural's chapter on "no killing" applies to both humans and animals, in stark contrast to the Bible's concept of killing, which refers only to the taking away of human life. He observes, "None of the ten epithets by which the Deity is described in the opening chapter of the Kural have the remotest connection with Christ or God, that is to say, as they are designated in the Bible". He also says that the chapter on love "is quite different from the Apostle's eulogium in 1 Cor. xiii".

In the 1960s, some South Indian Christians led by M. Deivanayagam at the Madras Christian College, presented Valluvar as a disciple of Thomas the Apostle. According to this theory, Thomas visited present-day Chennai, where Valluvar listened to his lectures on the Sermon on the Mount. However, later scholars refute this claim. According to Zvelebil, the ethics and ideas in Valluvar's work are not Christian ethics, but those found in Jainism doctrine, which can be seen from the Kural's unwavering emphasis on the ethics of moral vegetarianism (Chapter 26) and non-killing (Chapter 33), as against any of the Abrahamic religious texts.

== Literary works ==
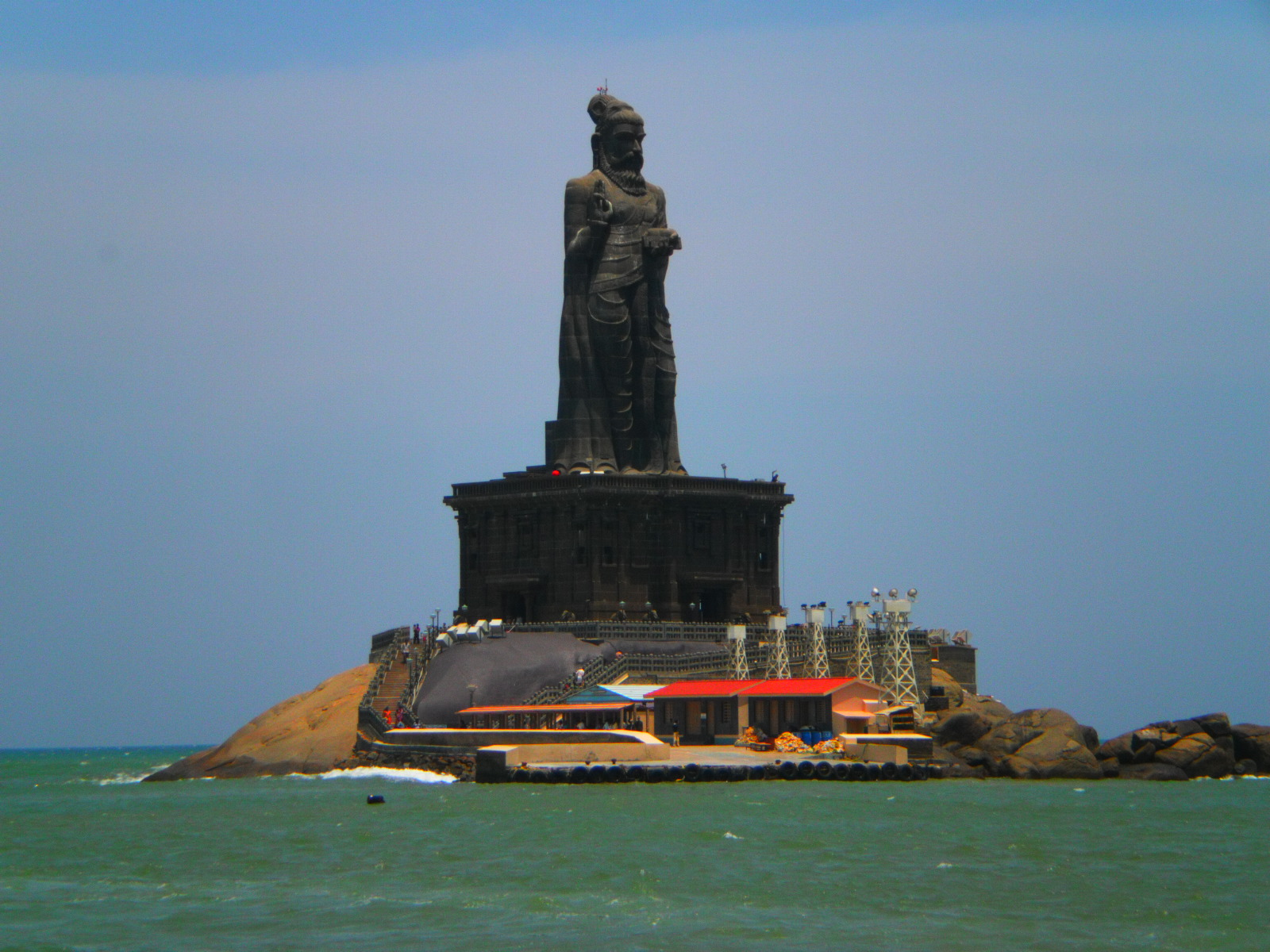
Statue of Valluvar at Kanyakumari

Tirukkuṟaḷ is the primary work credited to Valluvar. It contains 1330 couplets, which are divided into 133 sections of 10 couplets each. The first 38 sections are on moral and cosmic order (Tamil: aram, Skt: dharma), the next 70 are about political and economic matters (Tamil: porul, Skt: artha), and the remaining 25 are about pleasure (Tamil: inbam, Skt: kama).

Of the three sections, Valluvar's second section (porul) is about twice the size of first section, and three times that of the third. In the 700 couplets on porul (53% of the text), Valluvar mostly discusses statecraft and warfare. Valluvar's work is a classic on realism and pragmatism, and it is not a mystic, purely philosophical document. Valluvar teachings are similar to those found in Arthasastra, but differ in some important aspects. In Valluvar's theory of state, unlike Kautilya, the army (patai) is most important element. Valluvar recommends that a well kept and well trained army (patai) led by an able commander and ready to go to war is necessary for a state. Valluvar presents his theory of state using six elements: army (patai), subjects (kuti), treasure (kul), ministers (amaiccu), allies (natpu), and forts (aran). Valluvar also recommends forts and other infrastructure, supplies and food storage in preparation for siege.

The Tirukkuṟaḷ text has been translated into several Indian and international languages. It was translated into Latin by Constanzo Beschi in 1730, which helped make the work known to European intellectuals. Tirukkuṟaḷ is one of the most revered works in the Tamil language.

Tirukkuṟaḷ is generally recognized as the only work by Valluvar. However, in the Tamil literary tradition, Valluvar is attributed to be the author of many other later-dated texts including two Tamil texts on medicine, Gnana Vettiyan (1500 verses) and Pancharathnam (500 verses). Many scholars state that these are much later era texts (16th and 17th centuries), possibly by an author with the same name as Valluvar. These books, 'Pancharathnam' and 'Gnana Vettiyan', contribute to Tamil science, literature and other Siddha medicines. In addition to these, 15 other Tamil texts have been attributed to Valluvar, namely, Rathna Sigamani (800 verses), Karpam (300 verses), Nadhaantha Thiravukol (100 verses), Naadhaantha Saaram (100 verses), Vaithiya Suthram (100 verses), Karpaguru Nool (50 verses), Muppu Saathiram (30 verses), Vaadha Saathiram (16 verses), Muppu Guru (11 verses), Kavuna Mani (100 verses), Aeni Yettram (100 verses), Guru Nool (51 verses), Sirppa Chinthamani (a text on astrology), Tiruvalluvar Gyanam, and Tiruvalluvar Kanda Tirunadanam. Several scholars, such as Devaneya Pavanar, deny that Thiruvalluvar was the author of these texts.

== Reception ==
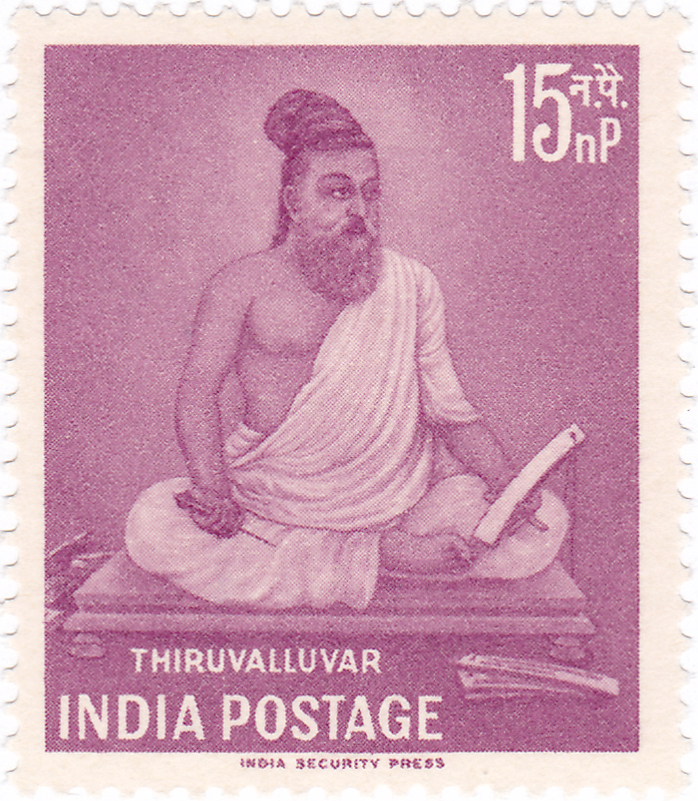
A 1960 commemorative stamp of Valluvar

George Uglow Pope called Valluvar "the greatest poet of South India", but according to Zvelebil, he does not seem to have been a poet. According to Zvelebil, while the author handles the metre very skillfully, the Tirukkuṟaḷ does not feature "true and great poetry" throughout the work, except, notably, in the third book, which deals with love and pleasure. This suggests that Valluvar's main aim was not to produce a work of art, but rather an instructive text focused on wisdom, justice, and ethics.

Valluvar is revered and highly esteemed in the Tamil culture, and this is reflected in the fact that his work has been called by nine different names: Tirukkuṟaḷ (the sacred kural), Uttaravedam (the ultimate Veda), Thiruvalluvar (eponymous with the author), Poyyamoli (the falseless word), Vayurai valttu (truthful praise), Teyvanul (the divine book), Potumarai (the common Veda), Muppal (the three-fold path), and Tamilmarai (the Tamil Veda).

Its influence and historic use is legendary. In 1708, the German missionary, Bartholomaus Ziegenbalg, remarked that the Malabaris "think very highly of it", they make it "their handbook" often quoting from it to prove the validity of their traditions and arguments, and such books are "not just read but learned by heart" by the learned among them. According to Blackburn, it is hard to outdo the "hyperbolic honors" heaped on Valluvar and his work by the early Europeans in colonial India. Gover, for example, praised it as "Tamil Homer, The Ten Commandments, and Dante rolled into one". During the colonial era, it was the text the Hindus used to respond to the "Christian allegations of Hindu superstition and barbarity".

=== Temples ===
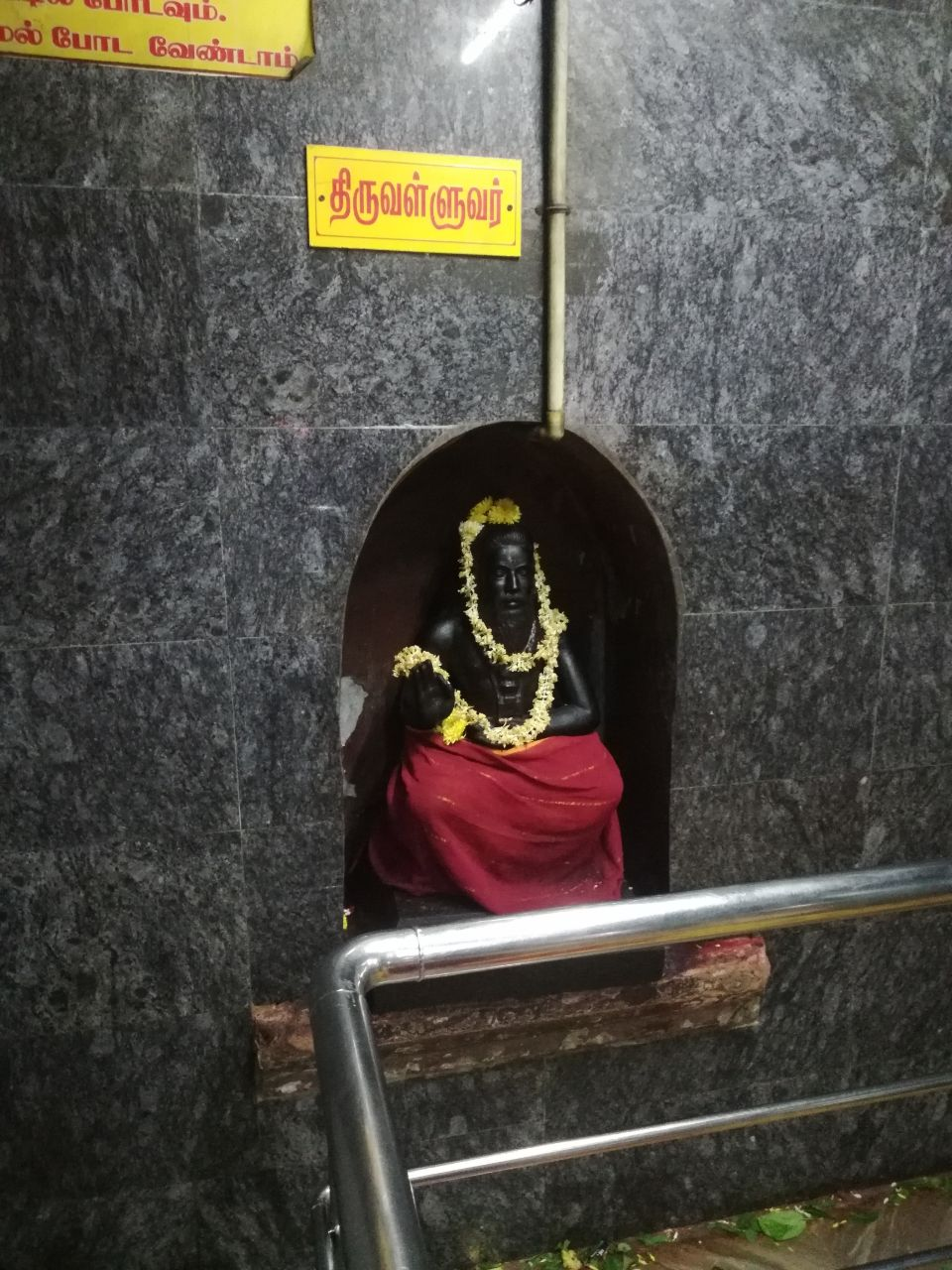
Valluvar idol at the Putlur Amman Temple in Tamil Nadu

Valluvar is traditionally worshiped as a god and saint by various communities across the Southern region of India. Many communities, including those in Mylapore and Tiruchuli, worship Valluvar as the 64th Nayanmar of the Saivite tradition. There are various temples exclusively dedicated to Valluvar across South India. The most famous of these is the temple at Mylapore, Chennai. Built in the early 16th century, the shrine is located within the Ekambareeswara-Kamakshi (Shiva-Parvati) temple complex in Mylapore. The locals believe that this is where Valluvar was born, underneath a tree within the shrines complex. A Valluvar statue in a seated posture holding a palm leaf manuscript of Tirukkuṟaḷ sits under the tree. In the shrine dedicated to him, Valluvar's wife Vasuki is patterned after the Hindu deity Kamakshi inside the sanctum. The temple shikhara (spire) above the sanctum shows scenes of Hindu life and deities, along with Valluvar reading his couplets to his wife. The sthala vriksham (holy tree of the temple) is the iluppai tree under which Valluvar is believed to have been born. The temple was extensively renovated in the 1970s.

At the Valluvar temple at Tiruchuli near Aruppukkottai in Virudhunagar district of the Indian state of Tamil Nadu, Valluvar is taken in a procession as the 64th Nayanmar on his death anniversary in the Tamil month of Maasi (February–March) by the Valluvar community, who are into fortune-telling, chiefly in the Periya Pudupatti village. The same practice can be found in other communities as well, including Mylapore.

Other temples for Valluvar are located at Periya Kalayamputhur, Thondi, Kanjoor Thattanpady, Senapathy, and Vilvarani.

=== Memorials ===
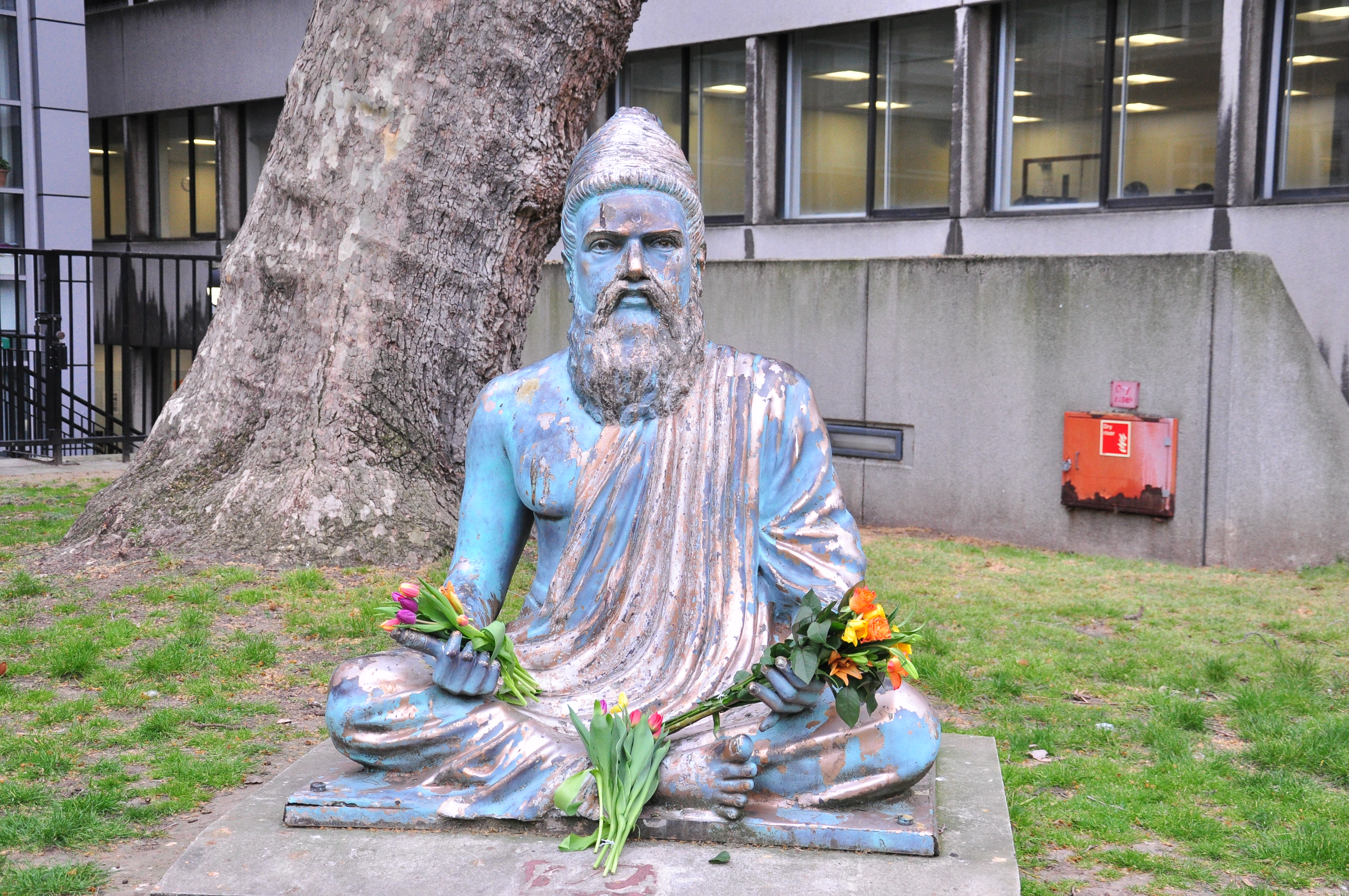
Thiruvalluvar statue at SOAS, University of London

A temple-like memorial to Valluvar, Valluvar Kottam, was built in Chennai in 1976. This monument complex consists of structures usually found in Dravidian temples, including a temple car carved from three blocks of granite, and a shallow, rectangular pond. The auditorium adjoining the memorial is one of the largest in Asia and can seat up to 4,000 people.

A 133-foot-tall statue of Valluvar was unveiled on 1 January 2000, at Kanyakumari at the southern tip of the Indian subcontinent, where the Arabian Sea, the Bay of Bengal, and the Indian Ocean converge. The 133 feet denote Tirukkuṟaḷ's 133 chapters or athikarams and the show of three fingers denote the three themes Aram, Porul, and Inbam, that is, the sections on morals, wealth and love. The statue was designed by V. Ganapati Sthapati, a temple architect from Tamil Nadu. On 9 August 2009, a statue was unveiled in Ulsoor, near Bengaluru, also making it the first of its kind in India for a poet of a local language to be installed in its near states other than his own homeland. A 12-foot statue of Valluvar was also installed in Haridwar, Uttarakhand. In 2025, the Sri Lankan Tamil community erected a statue of Valluvar in Dortmund, Germany. There is also a statue of Valluvar outside the School of Oriental and African Studies in Russell Square, London. A life-size statue of Valluvar is one among an array of statues installed by the Tamil Nadu government on the stretch of the Marina.

The Government of Tamil Nadu celebrates the 15th (16th on leap years) of January (the second of the month of 'Thai' as per Tamil Calendar) as Thiruvalluvar Day in the poet's honour, as part of the Pongal celebrations. Thiruvalluvar Day was first celebrated on 17 and 18 May 1935.

=== Music ===
Valluvar's works have also influenced the South Indian classical music and popular culture. Carnatic musicians and composers such as Mayuram Vishwanatha Shastri and M. M. Dandapani Desigar have tuned select couplets in the 19th and 20th centuries. In January 2016, Chitravina N. Ravikiran set music to the entire 1330 verses using over 169 Indian ragas. The Kural couplets have also been recorded by various Tamil film music composers.

== See also ==
- Sarvajna and Tiruvalluvar statues installation
- Valluvar Kottam
- List of Sangam poets
- Valluvar year
- Thiruvalla
- Kingdom of Valluvanad

== Notes ==
a. The period of Valluvar is dated variously by scholars from c. fourth century BCE to c. fifth century CE, based on various methods of analysis, including traditional accounts and linguistics analyses. The officially accepted date, however, is 31 BCE, as ratified by the government in 1921, and the Valluvar Year is being followed ever since. For more in-depth analysis, see Dating the Tirukkural.

b. "Valluvanadu" was a Taluk in erstwhile Madras Presidency as part of Malabar District. Currently, that area is part of Palakkad and Malappuram districts of Kerala adjoining the Nilgiri District of Tamil Nadu. The Valluvanadu kings claim that they descended from Pallava Kings and were ruling earlier from the Nilgiri area.
