= Dating the Tirukkural =

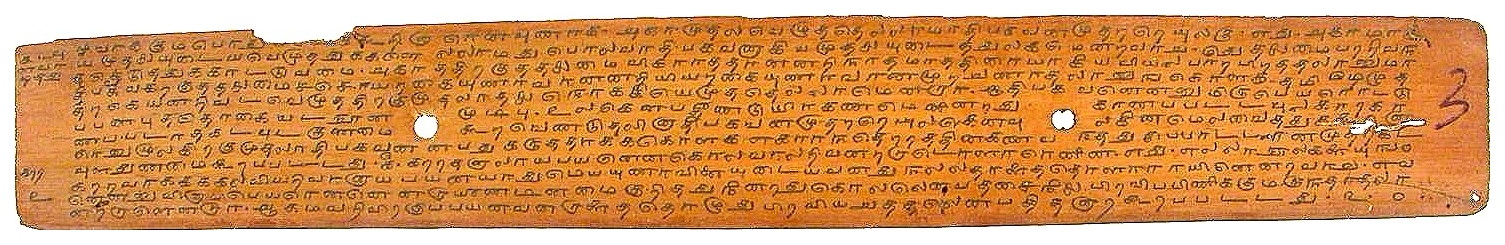
Palm leaf manuscript of the Tirukkural

The dating of the Tirukkural, and by extension the period of its author Valluvar, has been a subject of intense debate among scholars for centuries, and it continues to remain so. The Kural is variously dated between 300 BCE and 5th century CE. According to scholar Stuart Blackburn, the "current scholarly consensus" dates the text and the author to approximately 500 CE. The Tamil Nadu government has ratified 31 BCE as the year of birth of Valluvar. Still the precise date as to when Valluvar completed writing the Kural text remains murky. This article speaks about various dates arrived at by various scholars over time.

== Dating bases ==
The Tirukkural belongs to the Late-Sangam period and has been listed as one of the chief text of the Sangam corpus. However, scholars find it difficult to ascertain the exact period of the text and its author and have employed, besides archaeological research, various historical references and linguistic methodologies to arrive at a date.

The following are some of the linguistic methodologies scholars use to date the Kural text:

- Comparing the text with other contemporary Sanskrit texts and finding out the date by the relevance found in them.
- Finding out the date on the basis of the number of Sanskrit loan words found in the Kural literature.
- Arriving at a date on the basis of the meaning of certain terms as suggested by early commentators.

The Sangam texts were historically grouped as the Eighteen Greater Texts (which includes the Ten Idylls and the Eight Anthologies) and the Eighteen Lesser Texts in that order. Many scholars count only the Eighteen Greater Texts as proper Sangam texts and refer to the Eighteen Lesser Texts as the late-Sangam works. The Kural literature, which has been traditionally listed under the Eighteen Lesser Texts group, is the oldest of this group. Evidently, there is no mention about Valluvar in any of the proper Sangam texts. Thus, scholars conclude that the Kural literature appeared only after the Ten Idylls and the Eight Anthologies texts.

In the earliest Sangam literature, verses were composed mostly in the asiriyappa metre. Later texts were written in the vanjippa metre. Other metres such as kalippa, paripaadal, and venpa appeared much later. Verses in all the proper Sangam texts appear in the asiriyappa, kalippa, and paripaadal metres. The Kural couplets were composed in the venpa metre. Thus, Kural is said to have been composed after the Ten Idylls and the Eight Anthologies texts.

The Kural literature has been dated variously from 300 BCE to 7th century CE. According to traditional accounts, it was the last work of the third Sangam, appearing before other post-Sangam texts, and was subjected to a divine test (which it passed). The scholars who uphold this tradition, such as Somasundara Bharathiar and M. Rajamanickam, date the text to as early as 300 BCE. Historian K. K. Pillay assigned it to the early 1st century CE.

== Content-based dating ==
While the earlier Sangam texts approved of, and even glorified, the four immoral deeds of meat-eating, alcohol consumption, polygamy, and prostitution, the Kural literature strongly condemns these as crimes. Moreover, it was the Kural text that condemned these as crimes for the first time in the history of the Tamil land. Thus, scholars find this as another reason to place the Kural text after the proper Sangam era.

== Historical dating ==
Scholars who consider Kural to be a work of the 1st century BCE include J. M. Nallaswamy Pillai, D. P. Palaniyappa Pillai, C. Rajagopalachari, C. Dhandapani Desikar, M. Rajamanickam, V. R. Ramachandra Dikshitar, Maraimalai Adigal, and Tarlochan Singh Bedi. According to these scholars, there are many evidences that put Valluvar's date during or before the 1st century BCE. For instance, in his work Description of Ceylon (1726), Dutch scholar and Christian missionary François Valentijn quotes Seneca the Younger's (c. 4 BCE–65 CE) mentioning of the Tirukkural in his works, hinting that Valluvar must have lived during or before Seneca the Younger's time: "Tiriwalluwir: One of their best prayer books, composed in clear and concise verses by Thiruwalluwer. Those who can read and understand him, can also understand the most difficult poets. This writer, according to the writings of Seneca, lived over 1500 years ago at Mailapore."

In his 1969 book, C. Dandapani Desikar cites the work Studies in Tamil Literature, which lists several historical evidences about Valluvar's period:

- Elaela Singan Chettiyar, historically known as a contemporary and friend of Valluvar, who has been mentioned as Elaela and Alara in Ceylon history, lived between 144 BCE and 101 BCE.
- Tiruvalluva Maalai, a collection of paeans praising the Kural text and Valluvar, was written by various late-Sangam authors, some of whom lived during the 1st century BCE.
- Mamulanar, one of the contributors of the Tiruvalluva Maalai, has mentioned about the Ganges flood in Pataliputra. However, he has not mentioned about the Pataliputra fire during the 1st century CE. This shows that Mamulanar lived before 1st century CE.
- The Kural text's books on aram and porul bear semblance with various Sanskrit texts such as the Dharma Shastra and Artha Shastra. Koutilya (371 BCE–283 BCE) authored the Artha Shastra during the 4th century BCE. If the Kural were based on these, it must have been authored no later than a couple of centuries.
- The Kural text is divided into three parts, which was a common practice during the period of the writing of works such as Panchatantra, Hitopadesha, Kamandaka, and other texts, which makes them a contemporary of the Kural literature.

== Linguistic dating ==
Opining that the Kural literature does not belong to the Sangam period, Czech linguist Kamil Zvelebil dates it to somewhere between 450 and 500 CE. His estimate is based on the language of the Kural text, its allusions to the earlier works, and its borrowing from some Sanskrit treatises. Zvelebil notes that the Kural text features several grammatical innovations, that are absent in the older Sangam literature. The Kural text also features a higher number of Sanskrit loan words compared with these older Sangam texts. According to Zvelebil, besides being part of the ancient Tamil literary tradition, Valluvar was also a part of the "one great Indian ethical, didactic tradition," as a few of his verses seem to bear similarities with the verses in Sanskrit texts such as Mānavadharmaśāstra and Kautilya's Arthaśāstra.

S. Vaiyapuri Pillai assigned the work to c. 650 CE, believing that it borrowed from some Sanskrit works of the 6th century CE. Zvelebil disagrees with this assessment, pointing out that some of the words that Vaiyapuri Pillai believed to be Sanskrit loan words have now been proved to be of Dravidian origin by Thomas Burrow and Murray Barnson Emeneau. Many Christian missionaries, such as George Uglow Pope and Robert Caldwell, even pushed the date further down to between 800 and 1000 CE, claiming that “Christian Scriptures were among the sources from which the poet derived his inspiration.” However, scholars, including Zvelebil, J. M. Nallaswamy Pillai, Sundaram Pillai, Kanakasabai Pillai, and Krishnaswamy Aiyengar, and even missionaries such as John Lazarus refute such claims. Albert Schweitzer hinted that “the dating of the Kural has suffered, along with so many other literary and historical dates, philosophies and mythologies of India, a severe mauling at the hands of the Christian Missionaries, anxious to post-date all irrefutable examples of religious maturity to the Christian era.” Zvelebil points out to the Kural's unwavering emphasis on the ethics of moral vegetarianism (Chapter 26) and non-killing (Chapter 33), as against any of the Abrahamic religious texts, which suggests that the ethics of the Kural is rather a reflection of the Jaina moral code than of Christian ethics. Nallaswamy Pillai declares Pope's claim as "an absurd literary anachronism" and says that the first two books of the Kural in particular are "a stumbling block which can browbeat the most sublime ideas of Christian morality." John Lazarus and Maharajan observe that, in stark contrast to the Bible's concept of killing, which refers only to the taking away of human life, the Kural's concept of killing pertains to both humans and animals as it "deals exclusively with the literal taking away of life."

Notwithstanding the incessant debate on the precise date, taking the latest of the estimated dates, the Tamil Nadu government officially declared 31 BCE as the year of Valluvar, as suggested by Maraimalai Adigal, in 1921. On 18 January 1935, Valluvar Year was officially added to the calendar.

== See also ==
- Tirukkural
- Glossary of names for the Tirukkural
- Thiruvalluvar year
