= Kanjoor =

Town in India

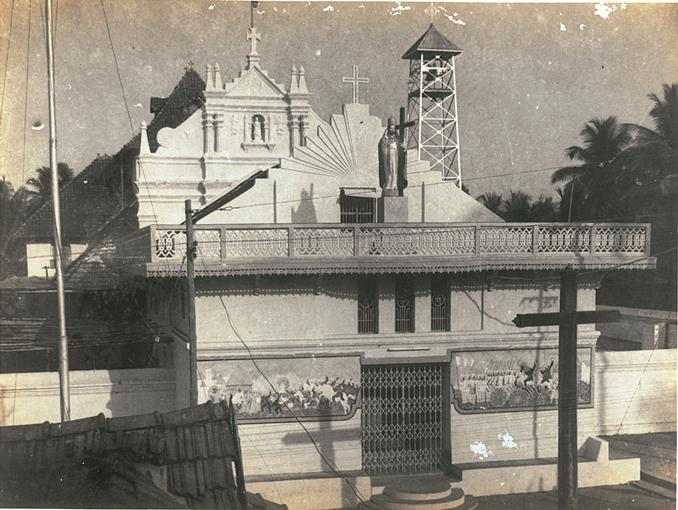
Kanjoor Church

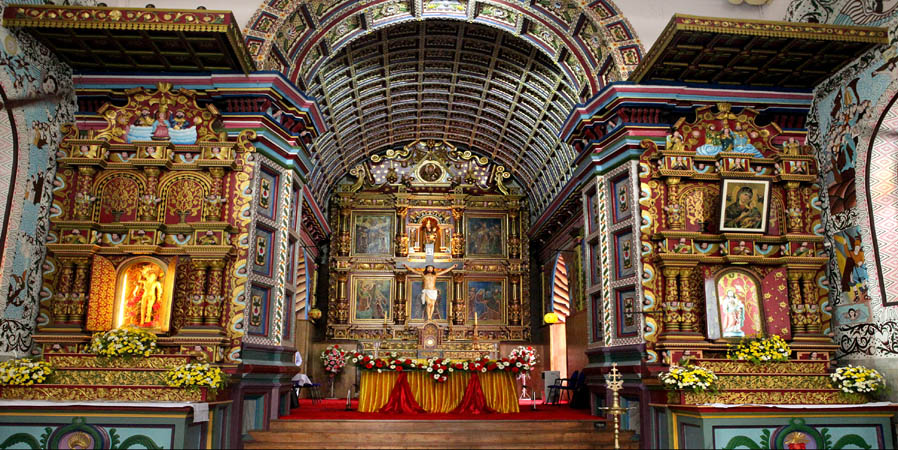
Althara at Kanjoor church

Kanjoor is a small town near to Aluva and Kalady. It is in Ernakulam district in the state of Kerala, India. The estimated population is 19,712. The town is home to the Thiruvalluvar Temple, dedicated to the poet-philosopher Valluvar. St Sebastian's Church is located here.

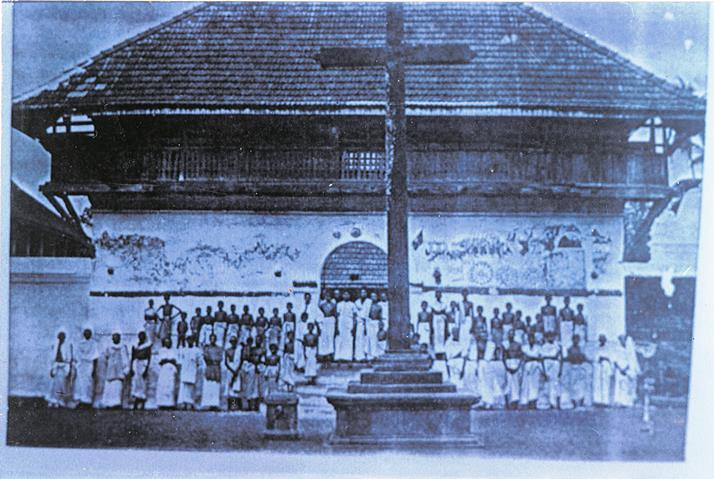
Kanjoor Church entrance

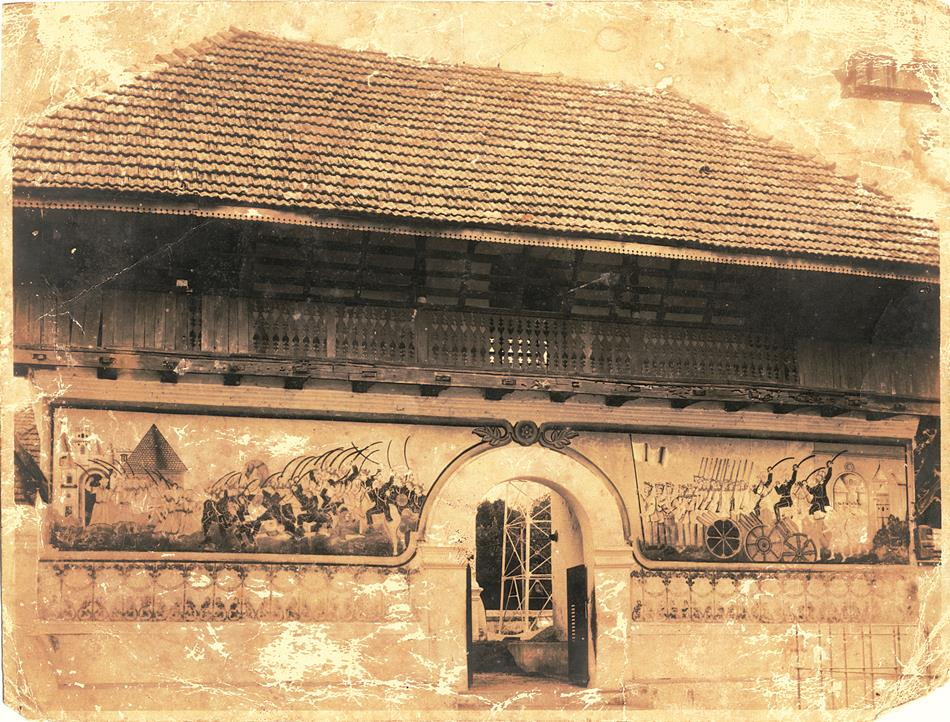
Kanjoor Church backside
