= Vilvarani (Tiruvannamalai district) =

Vilvaarani
- Village
- Location in Tamil Nadu, India
- Coordinates: 12.4440489°N 79.05592°E
- Country: India
- State: Tamil Nadu
- District: Tiruvannamalai

Languages
  - Official: Tamil
- Time zone: UTC+5:30 (IST)
- PIN: 606906

Vilvaarani is a panchayat village located in Tiruvannamalai district of Tamil Nadu, India. The village has a temple dedicated to the poet-philosopher Valluvar.

== See also ==
- Tiruvannamalai
