= Valluvar Kottam =

Building in India

- வள்ளுவர் கோட்டம்
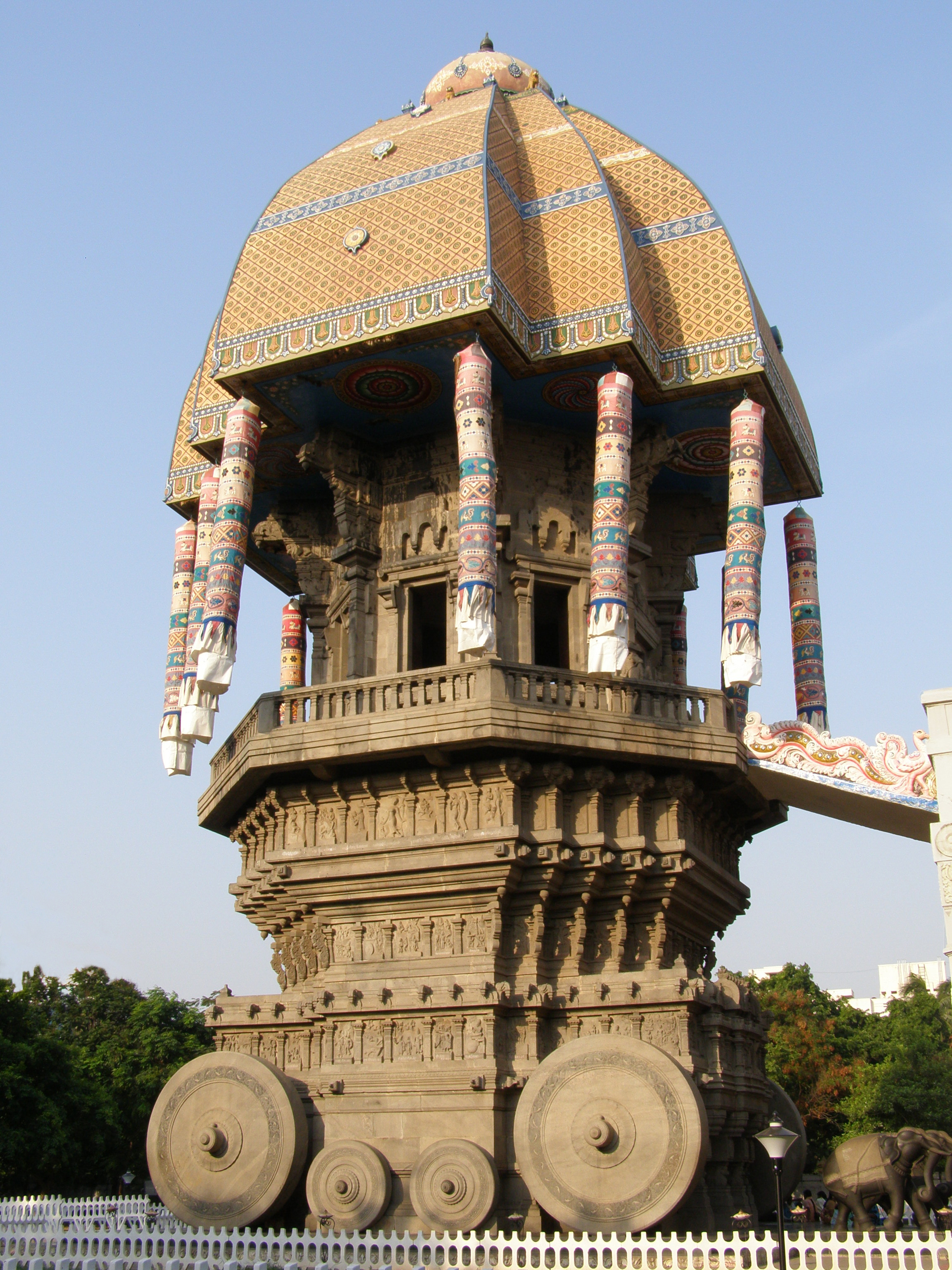
- Interactive map of the Valluvar Kottam area

General information
- Type: Monument
- Location: Chennai, India
- Coordinates: 13°3′15.88″N 80°14′30.3″E
- Completed: 1976
- Inaugurated: 15 April

Height
- Height: 39 metres (128 ft)

Design and construction
- Architecture firm: East Coast Constructions and Industries

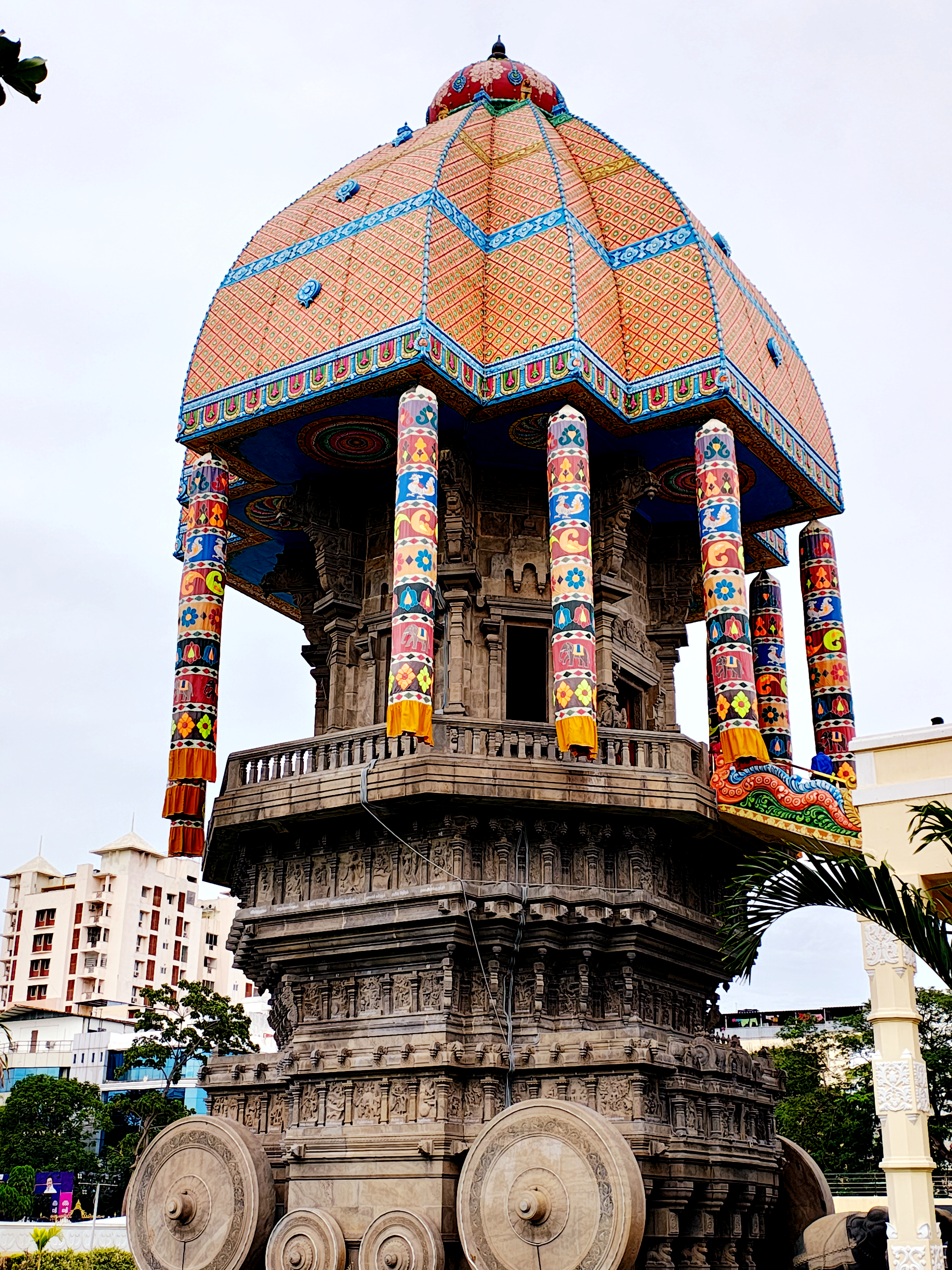
Valluvar Kottam Chariot

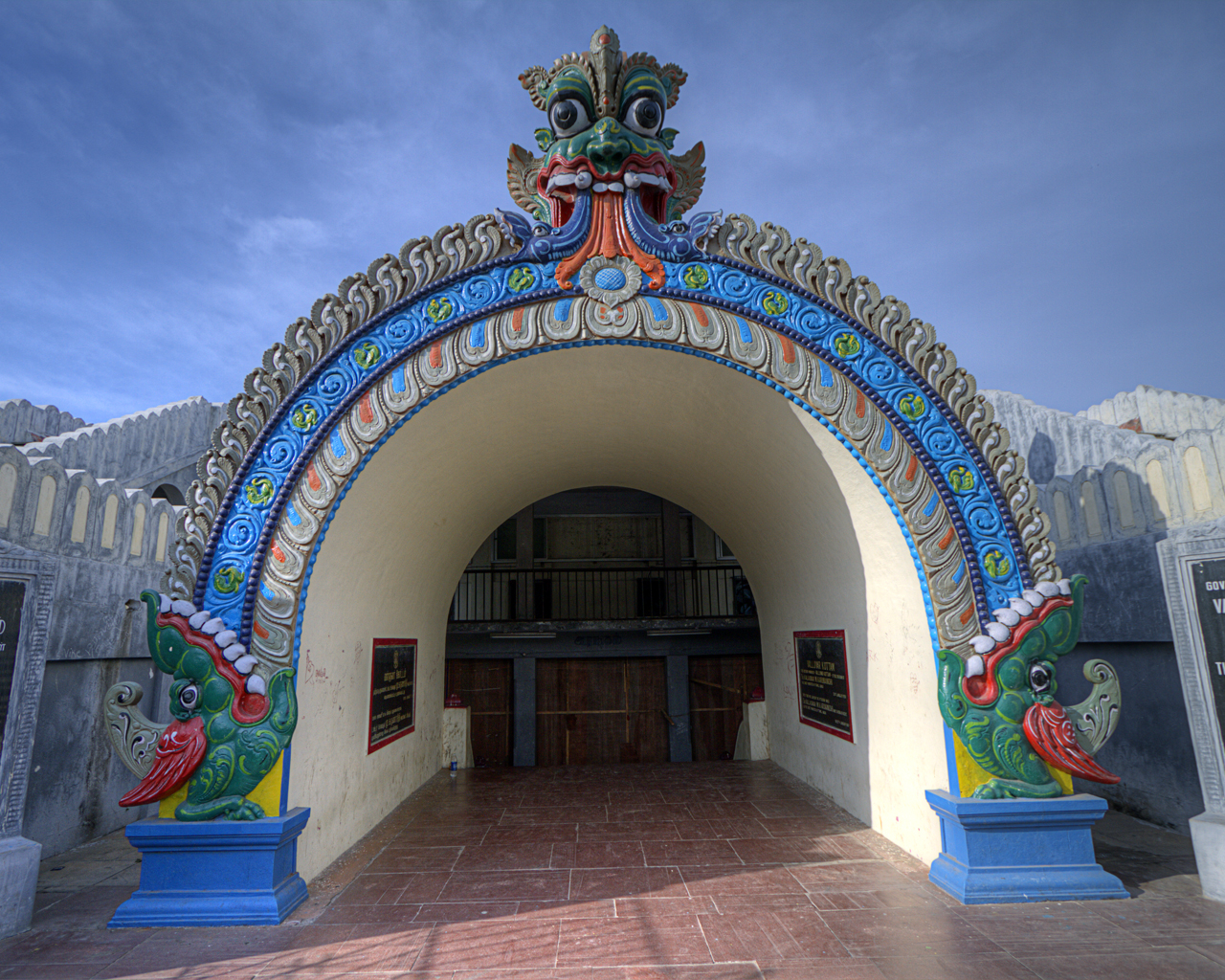
Valluvar Kottam Entrance

Valluvar Kottam (Tamil: வள்ளுவர் கோட்டம்) is a monument in Chennai, dedicated to the classical Tamil poet philosopher Valluvar. It is the city's biggest Tamil cultural centre.

== Location ==
Valluvar Kottam is located at the intersection of the Kodambakkam High road and the Village road in Nungambakkam neighbourhood of Chennai. The monument now stands at what was once the deepest point of a local lake called the Nungambakkam lake.

== History ==
The construction of the Valluvar Kottam was conceived and executed by the then Chief Minister of Tamil Nadu M. Karunanidhi during the 1970s. It was designed by South Indian traditional architect V. Ganapati Sthapati, who is also the architect of the Thiruvalluvar Statue at Kanyakumari. It was inaugurated in April 1976 by the then President of India Fakhruddin Ali Ahmed.

== The monument ==
The monument consists of a decorative arch, an auditorium that can accommodate around 3,500 people, and the Kural Manimandapa, where all the 1,330 couplets from all 133 chapters of the Kural literature are inscribed on bas-relief. The hallmark of the monument is the 39-meter-high (128-foot) stone car, a replica of the famed temple chariot of Thiruvarur. The chariot is made of around 3000 blocks of granite stone from Tiruvannamalai and weighs 2,700 tonnes. The largest of these stones weigh as much as 40 tonnes. The four giant-sized wheels of the chariot measure 11 feet in diameter and 2 feet in thickness. A life-size statue of Valluvar has been installed in the chariot. The chariot is adorned with the famed Kalamkari drawings. The bottom portion of the chariot features bas relief sculptures depicting all the 133 chapters of the Kural text. The central auditorium measures 220 feet by 100 feet and is said to be Asia's largest at the time of its construction. The roof of the monument has a terraced garden with two large pools.

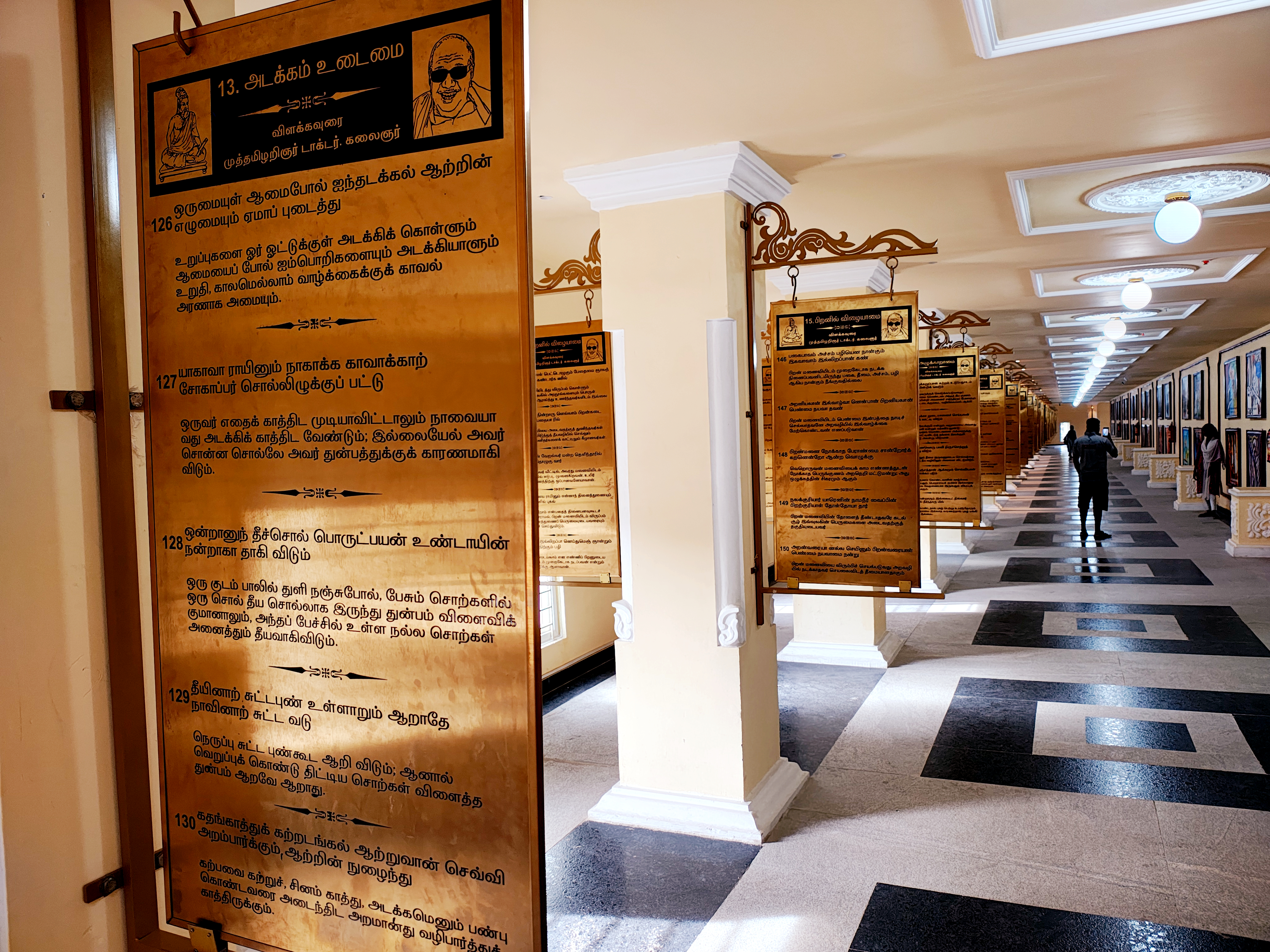
Valluvar Kottam Thirukkural Gallery

== Visitors ==
The monument is visited by an average of about 700 people during weekdays and 1000 people during weekends.

== Renovation ==
The monument is maintained by the memorial section of the information and public relations department of the state government. It was renovated in 2007 at a cost of ₹ 6 million. In 2018, the department started renovating the memorial at a cost of ₹ 8.5 million.

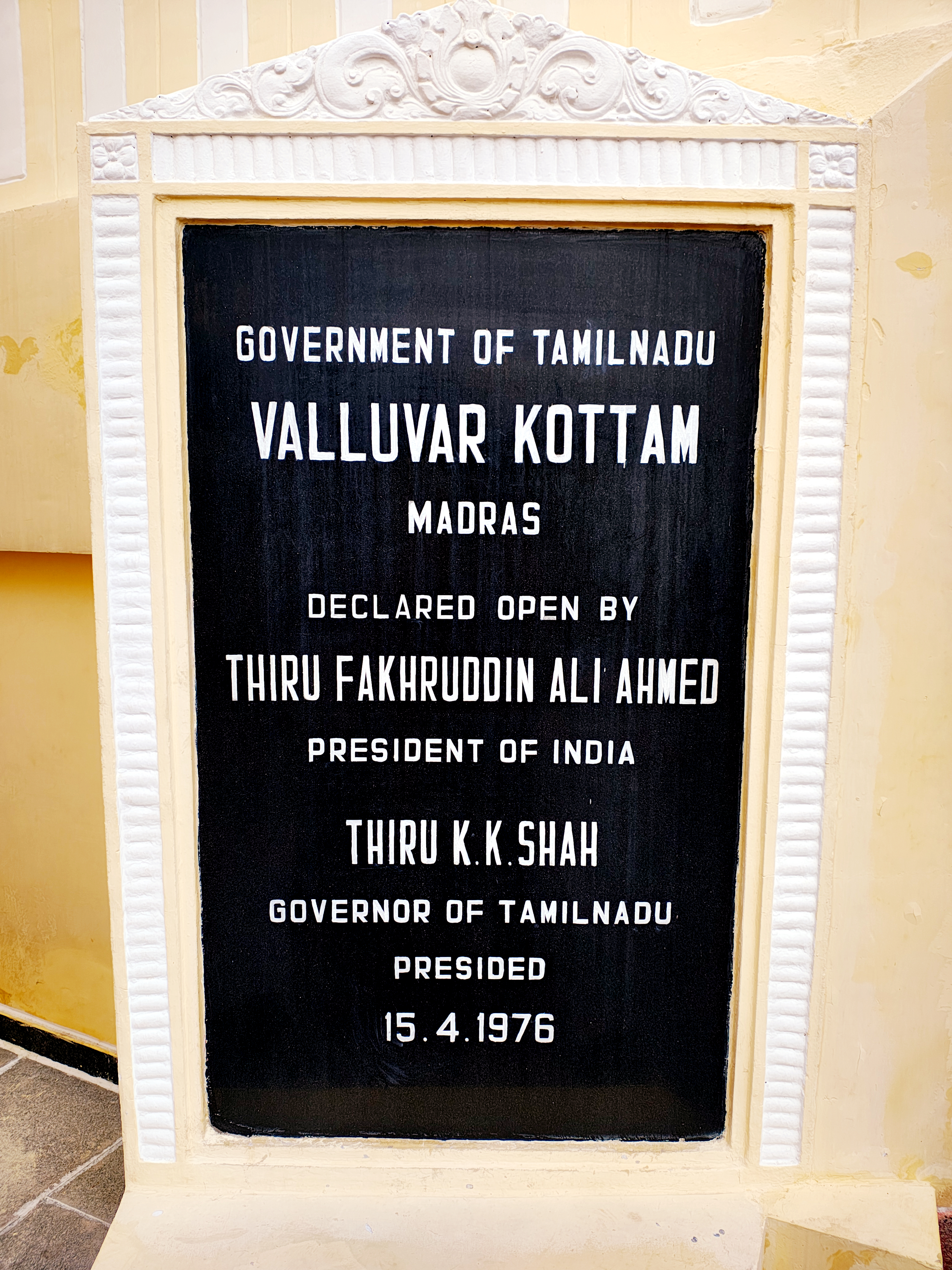
Valluvar Kottam Stone Plaque - Opening Date

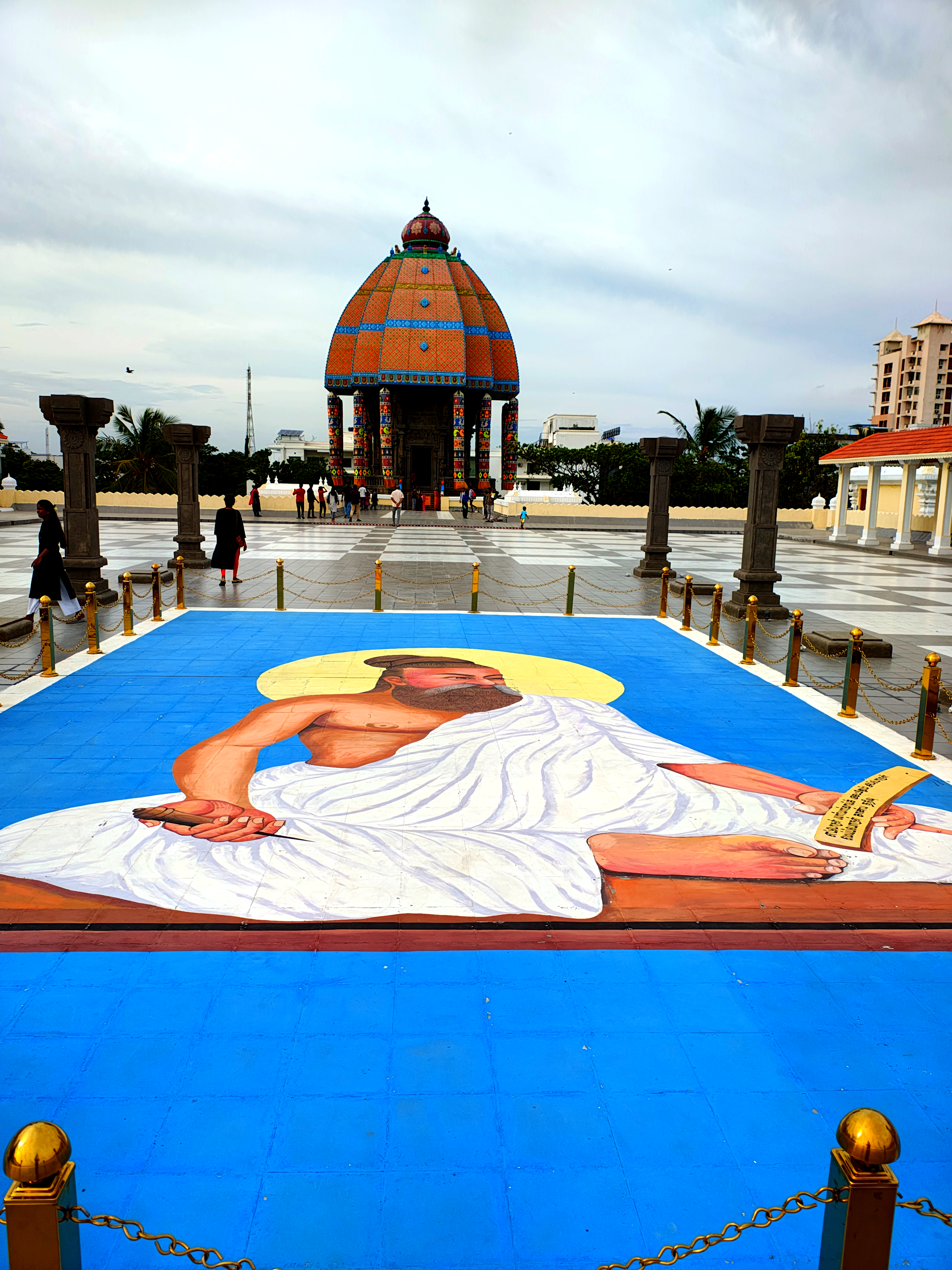
Valluvar Kottam Thiruvalluvar Painting

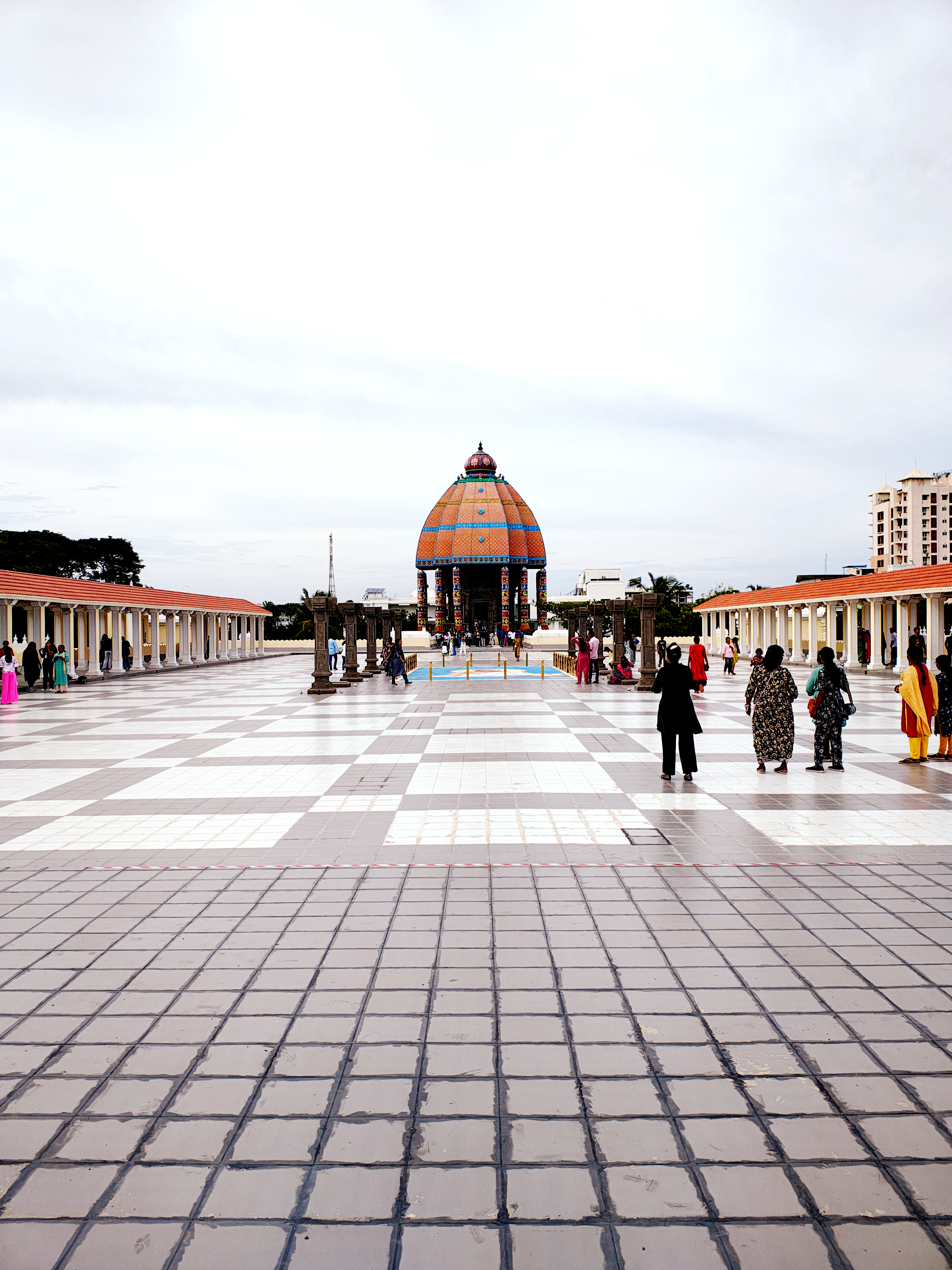
Valluvar Kottam Terrace

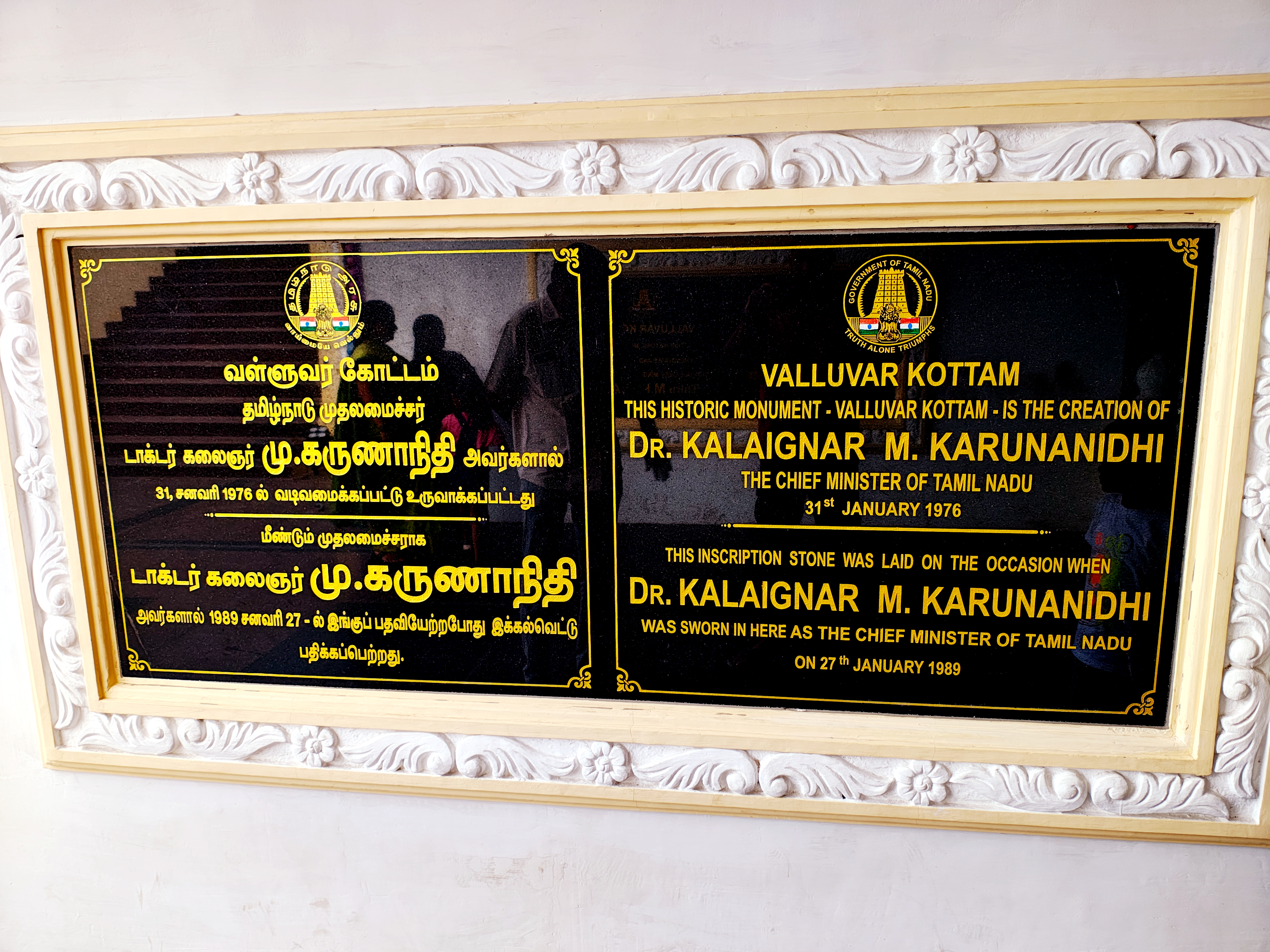
Valluvar Kottam Stone Plaque

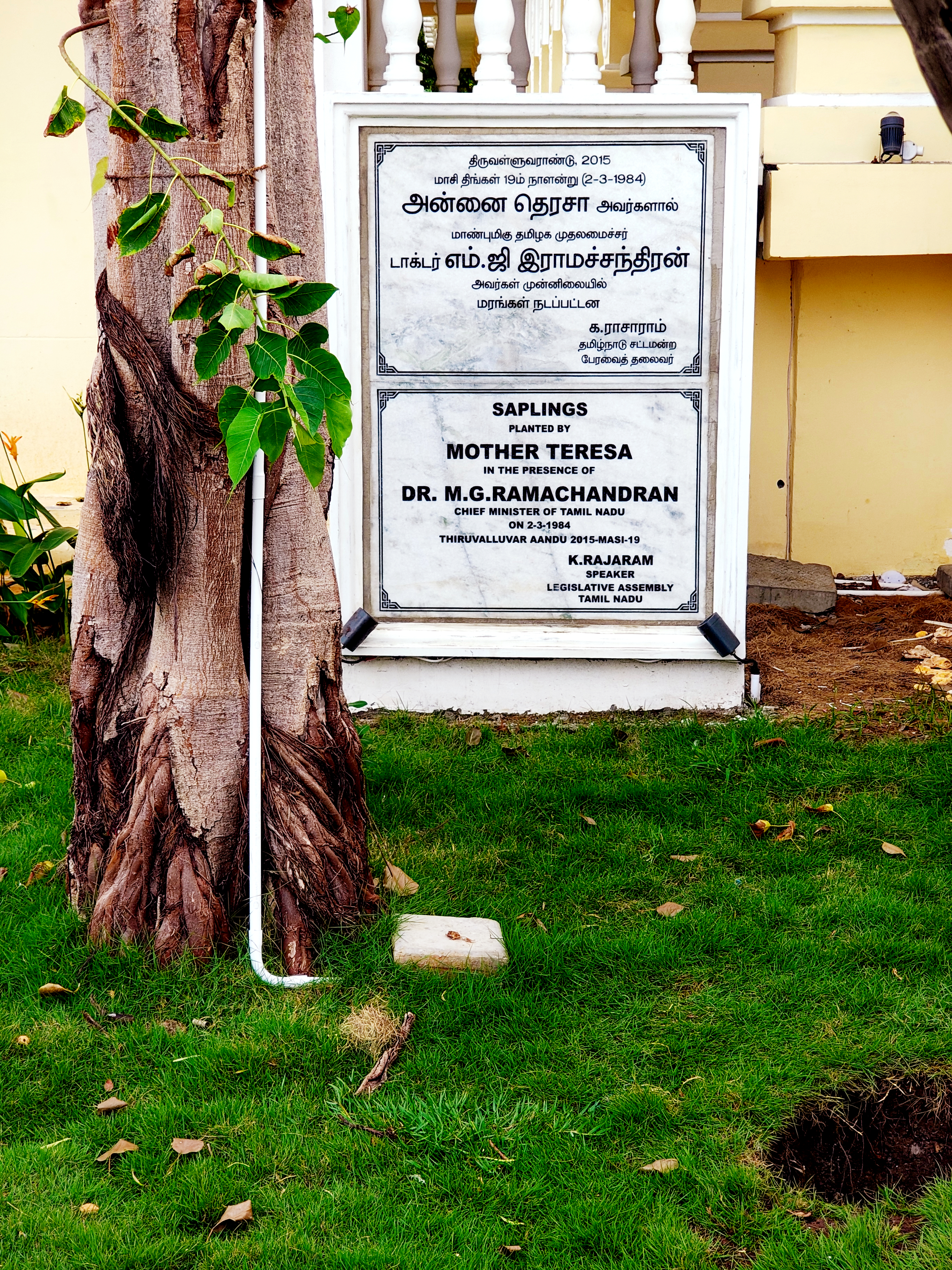
Valluvar Kottam Stone Plaque - Saplings

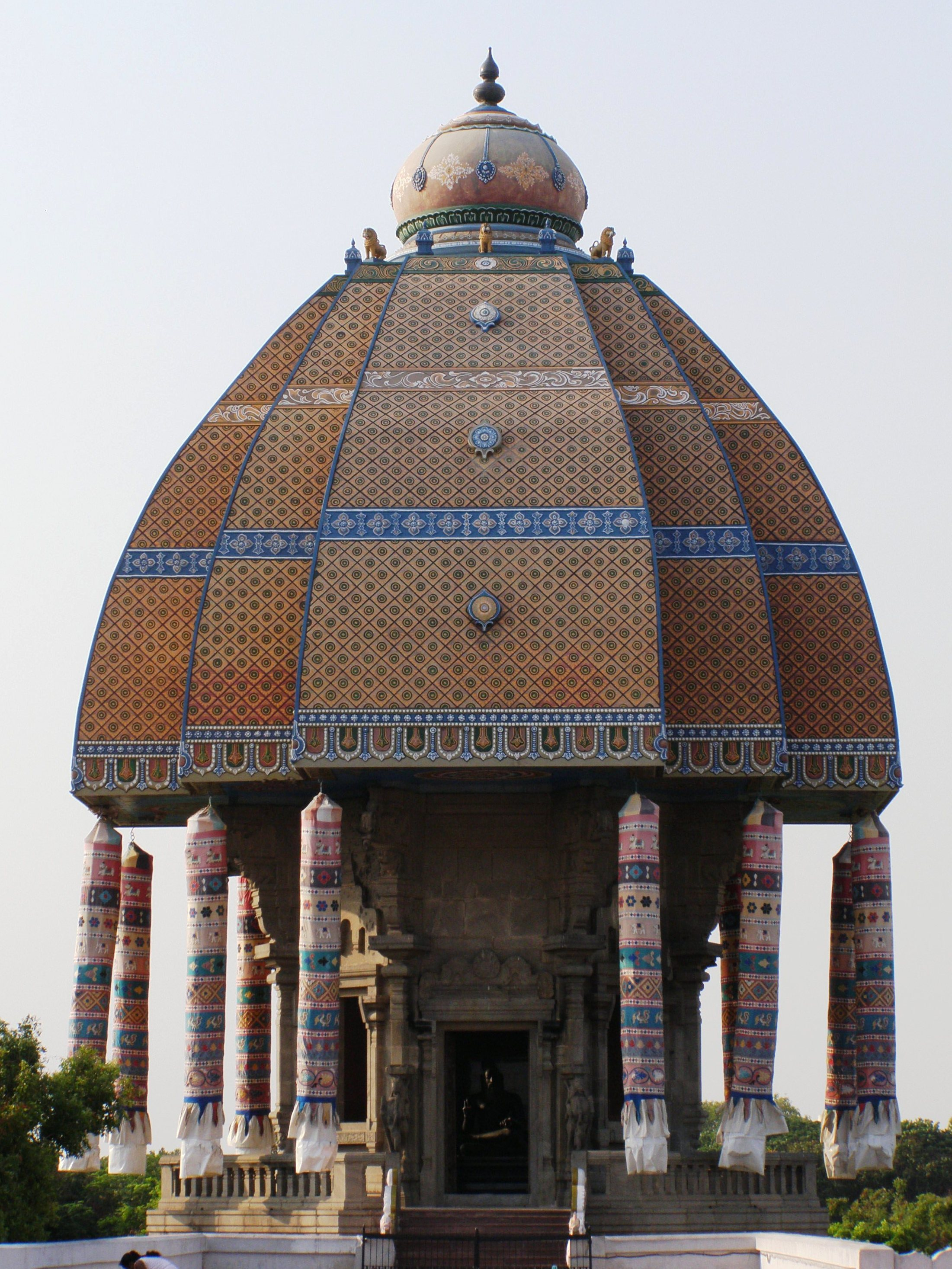
Terrace view of Valluvar Kottam

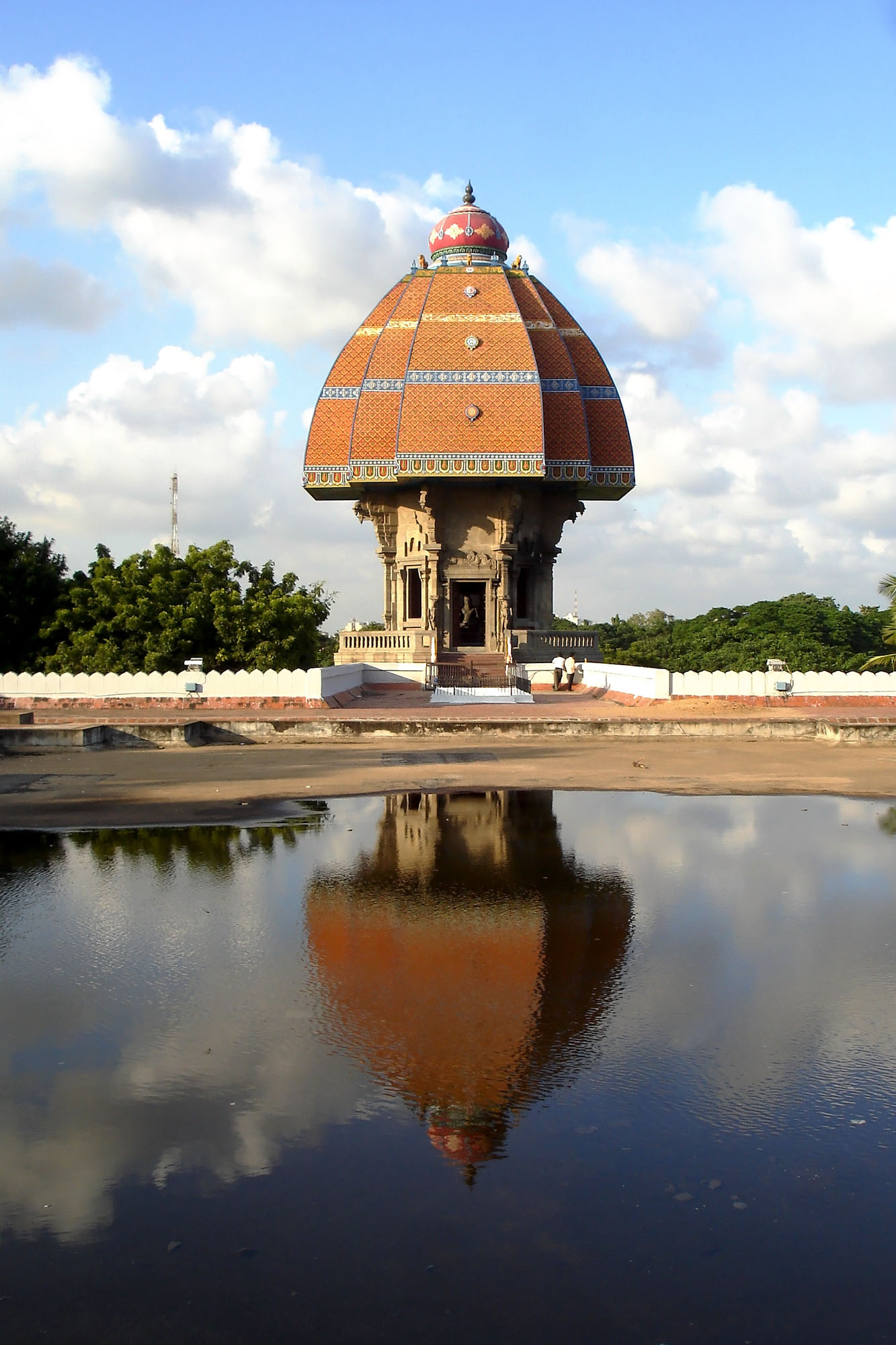
Terrace view of Valluvar Kottam

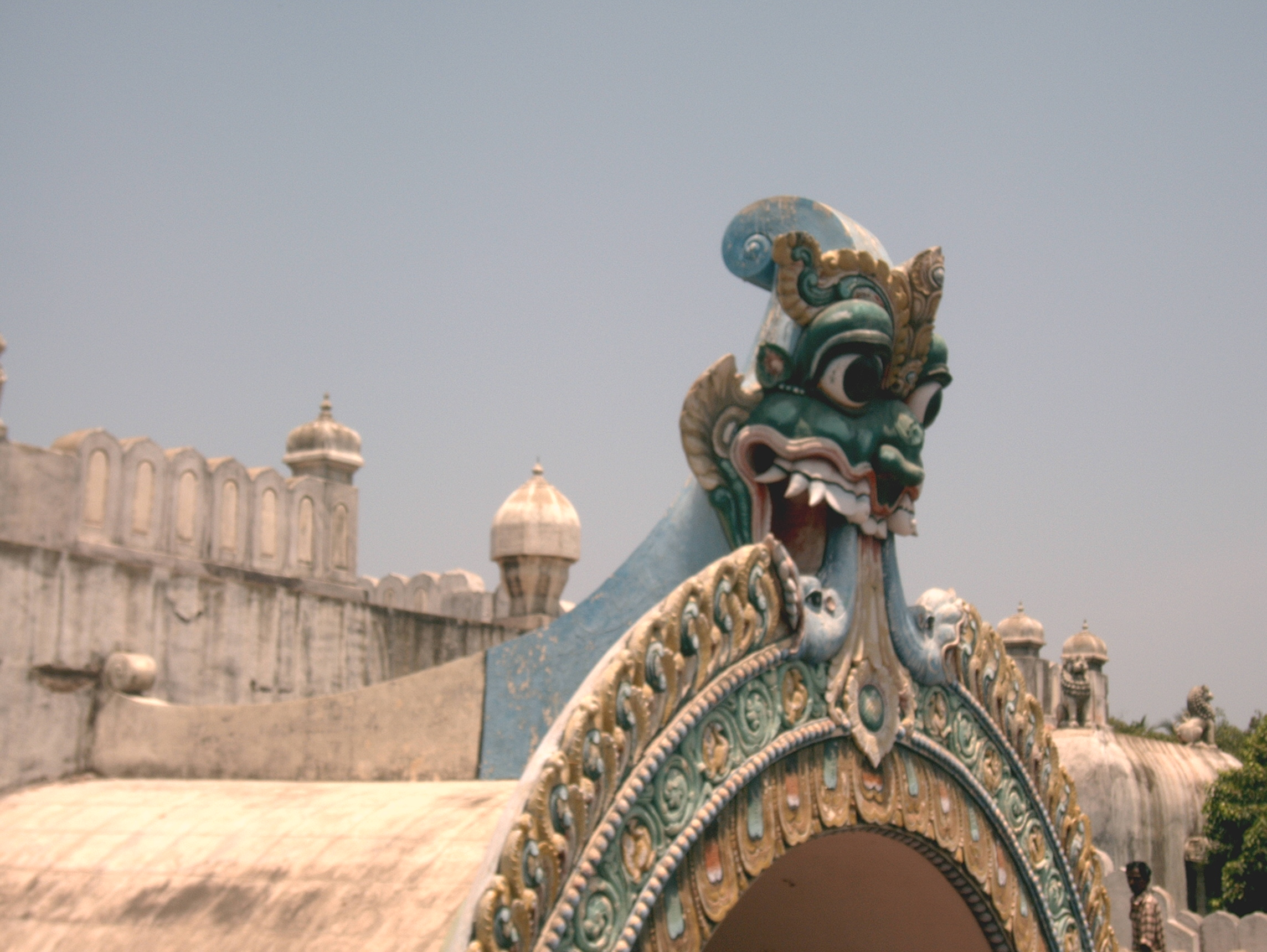
Lion on Valluvar Kottam

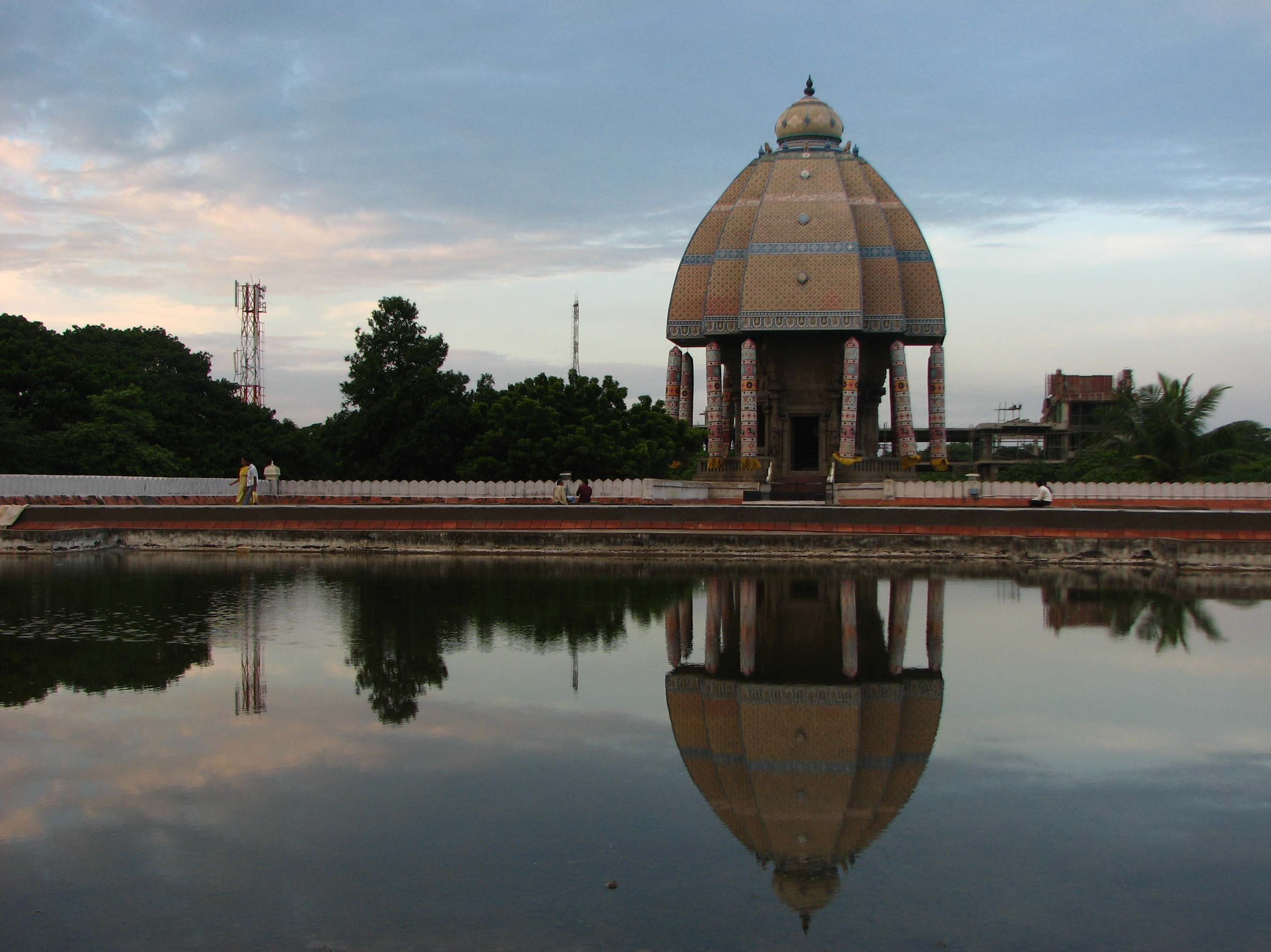
Terrace view of Valluvar Kottam

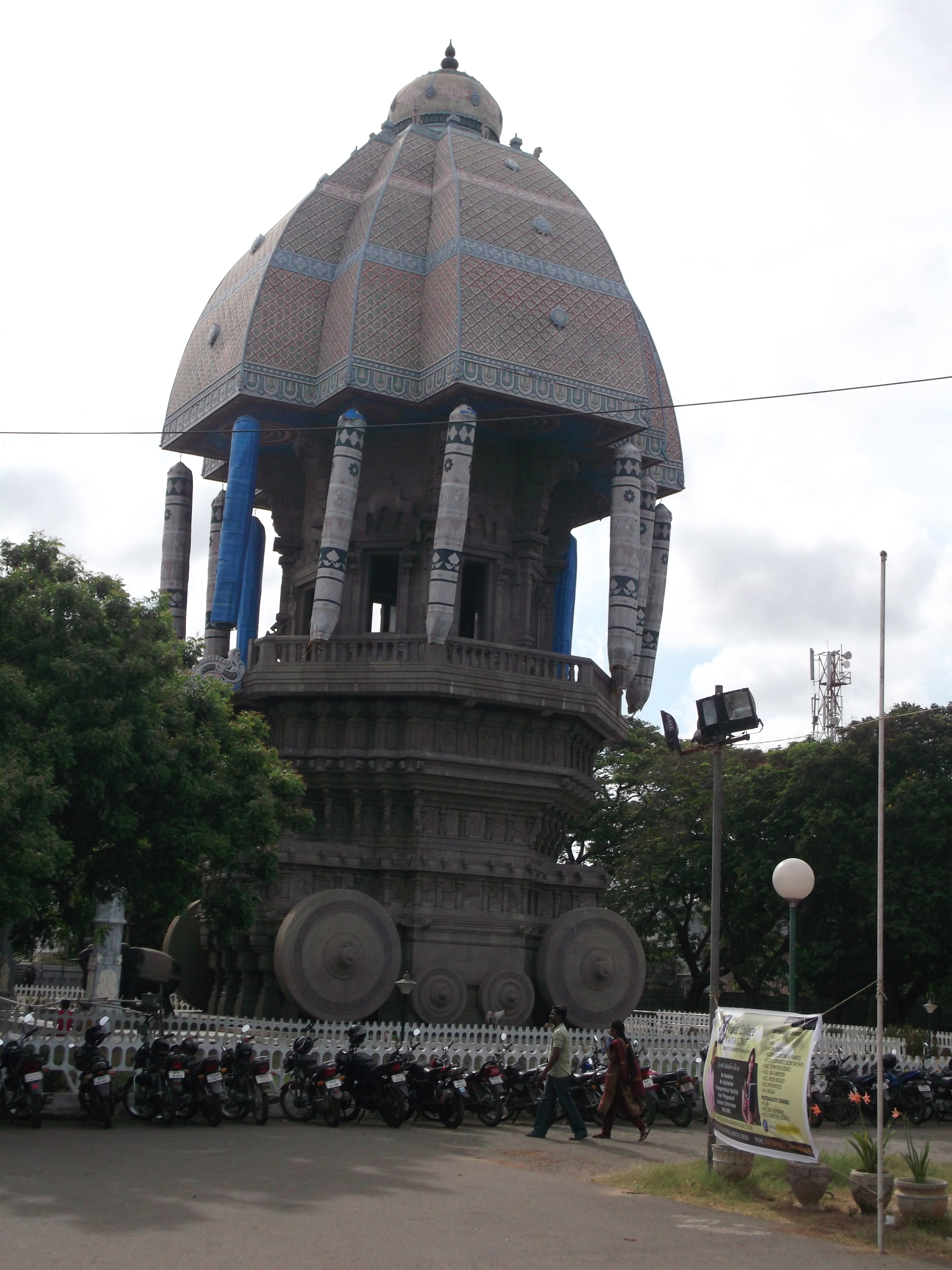
Valluvar kottam chariot

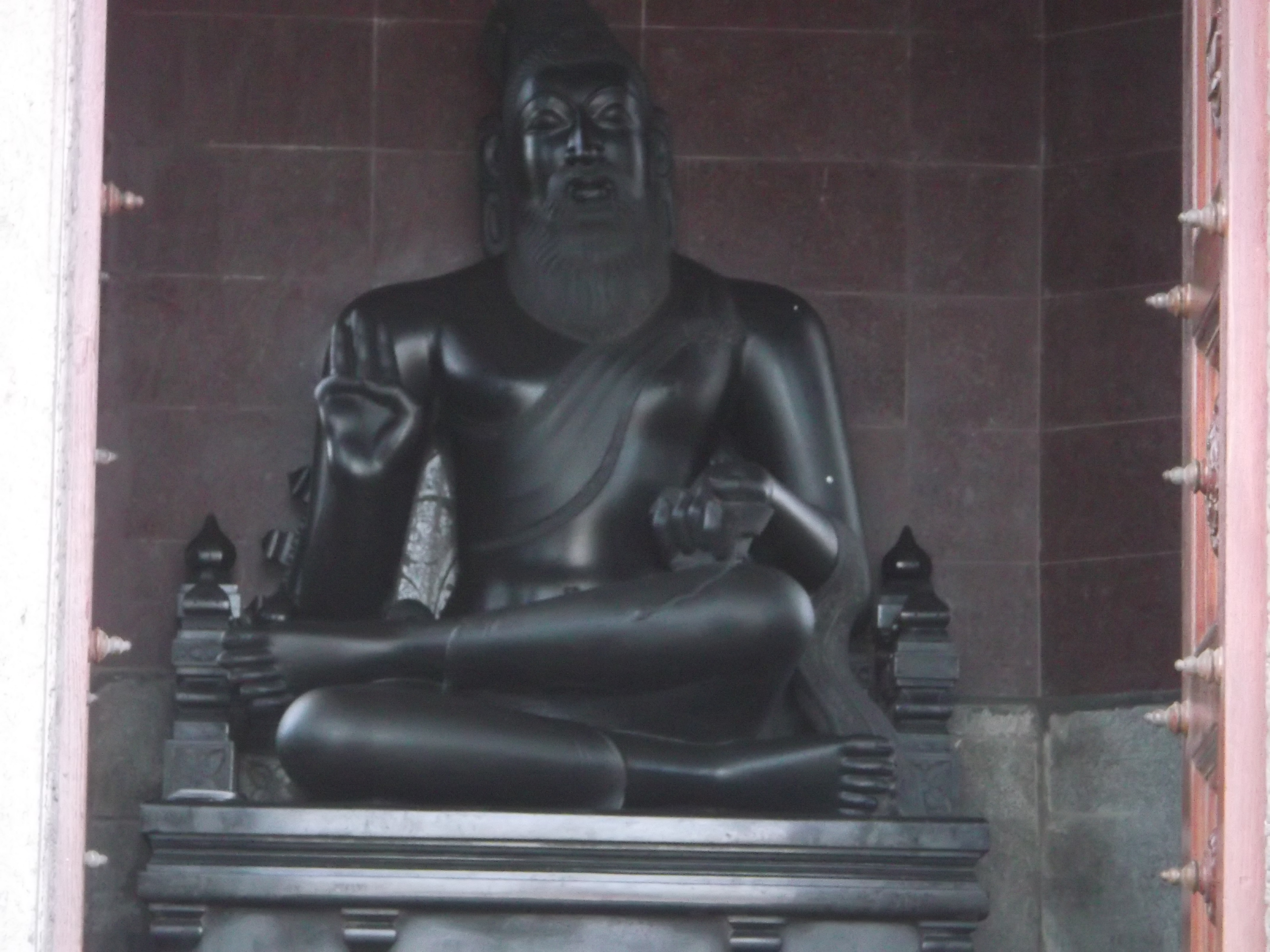
Tiruvalluvar statue inside valluvar kottam chariot

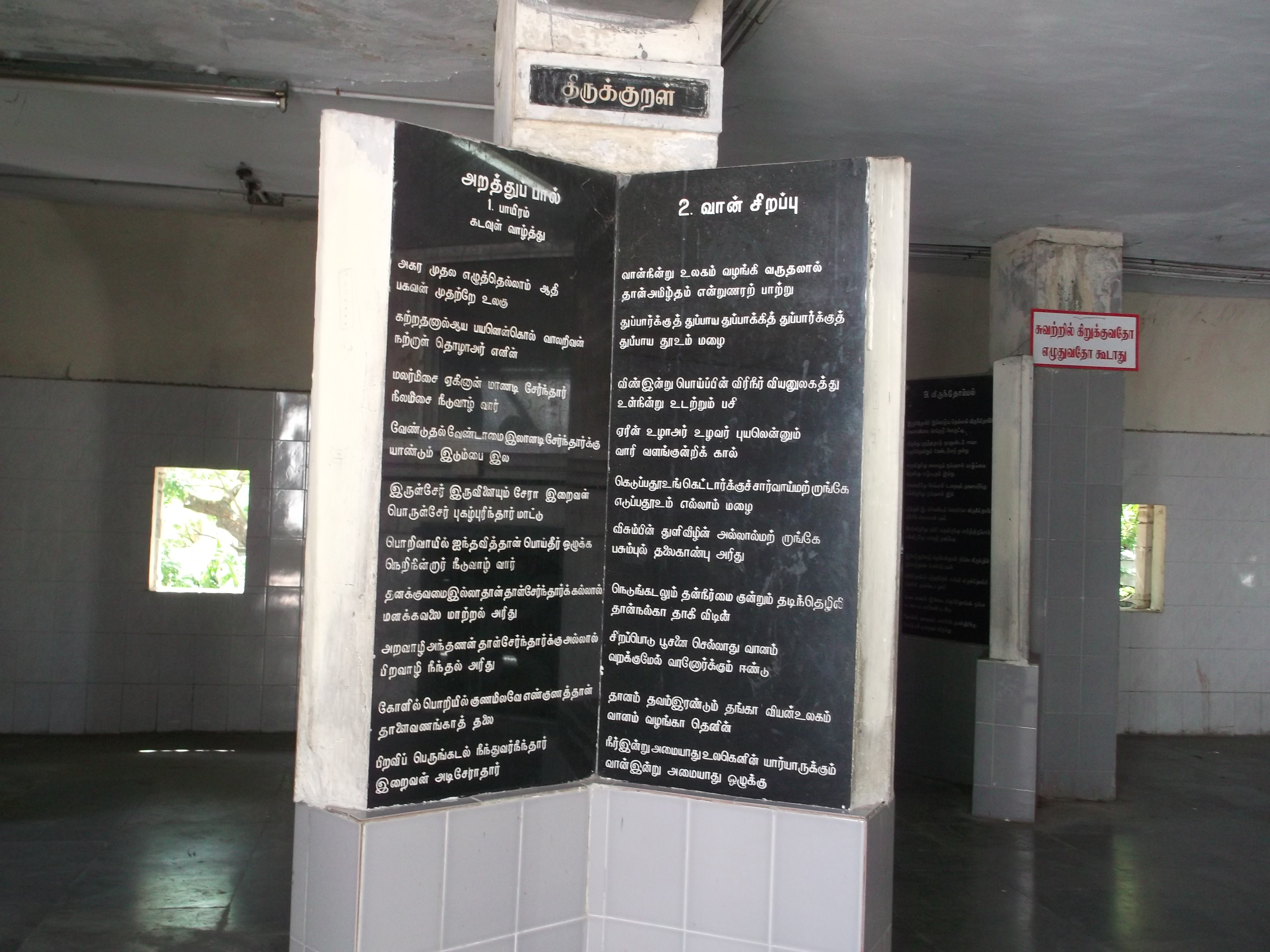
Tirukkural

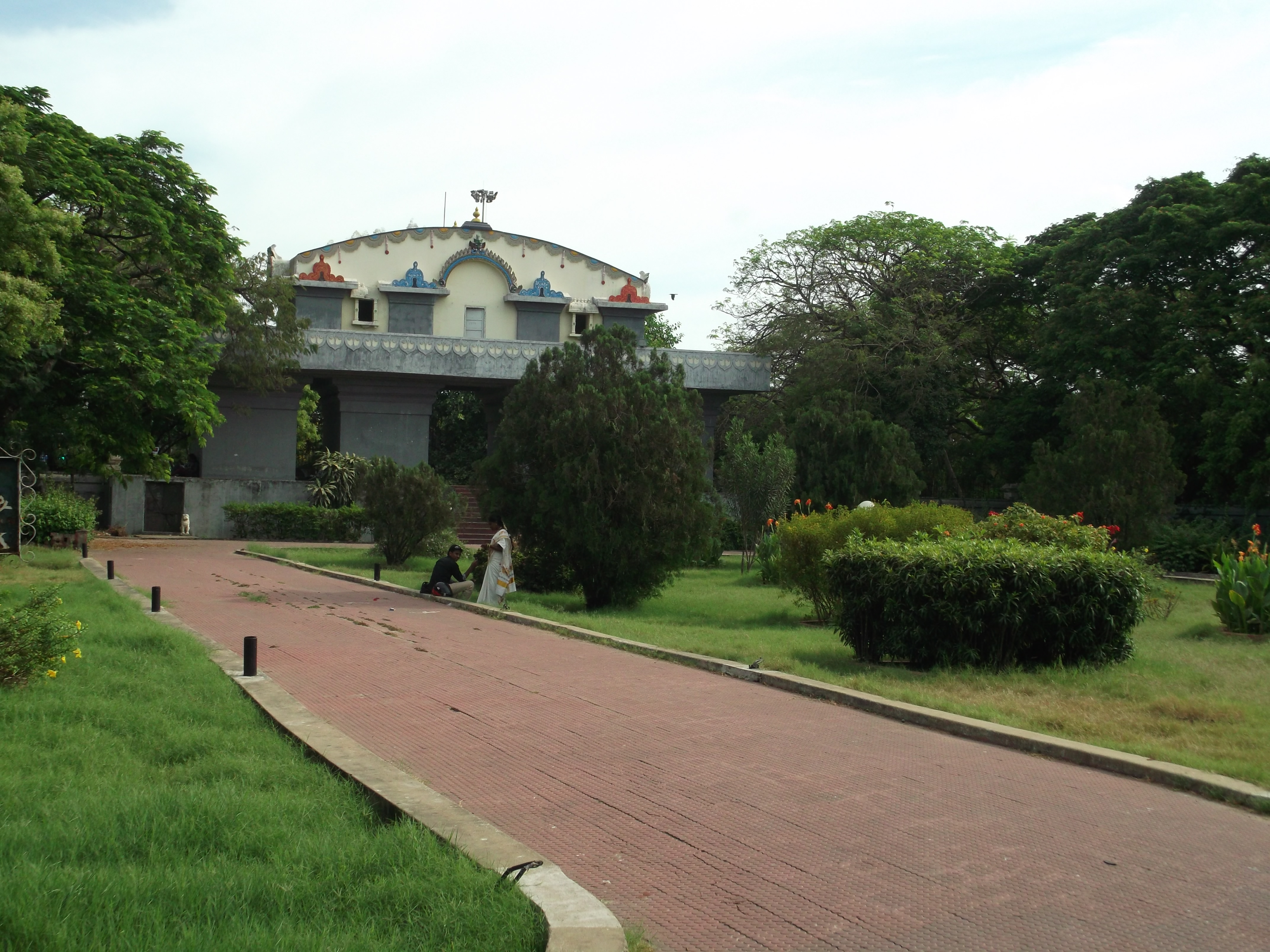
Plants

== See also ==
- Thiruvalluvar Temple, Mylapore
- Architecture of Chennai
- Heritage structures in Chennai
