= Senapathy (Idukki district) =

- Village
- Location in Kerala, India
- Coordinates: 9.9518°N 77.1744°E
- Country: India
- State: Kerala
- District: Idukki

Government
  - Type: Panchayati Raj (India)

Area
  - Total: 40.95 km^{2} (15.81 sq mi)

Population (2011)
  - Total: 12,529
  - Density: 306.0/km^{2} (792.4/sq mi)

Languages
  - Official: Malayalam
- Time zone: UTC+5:30 (IST)
- PIN: 685619

Senapathy is a Grama Panchayat village located in Nedumkandam Block Panchayat in Idukki district of Kerala, India.

The village is known for its spice and tea plantations. The name "Senapathy" is thought to derive from historial military connotations. The village has a temple dedicated to the poet-philosopher Valluvar.

== See also ==
- Idukki
