= Periya Kalayamputhur (Dindigul district) =

Periya Kalayamputhur பெரிய கலயம்புத்தூர்
- Village
- Location in Tamil Nadu, India
- Country: India
- State: Tamil Nadu
- District: Dindigul

Population (2011)
  - Total: 11,746

Languages
  - Official: Tamil
- Time zone: UTC+5:30 (IST)
- PIN: 624615/635158

Periya Kalayamputhur is a panchayat village located in the Palani Block in Dindigul district of Tamil Nadu, India. It is situated 5 km from sub-district headquarter Palani and 60 km away from the district headquarter of Dindigul. The village covers an area of 1412.67 hectares and has a total population of 11,746, including 5,730 males and 6,016 females, according to 2011 census. There are about 3,171 houses in the village.

== See also ==
- Dindigul
