= Valluvar year =

Calendar system used in Tamil Nadu

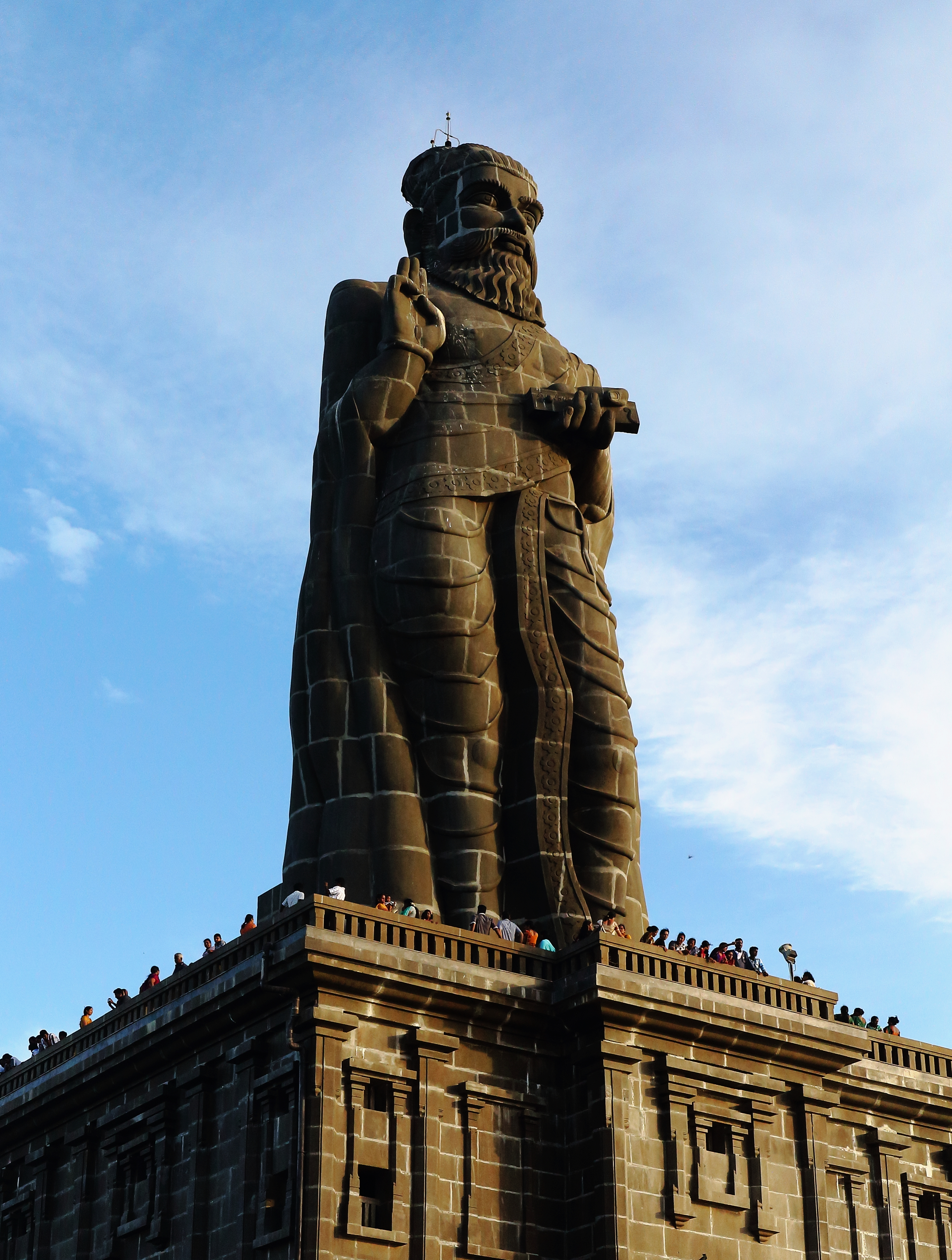
The Thiruvalluvar Year is a Tamil calendar based on Valluvar's birthday.

Valluvar year, also known as the Thiruvalluvar year, is an officially recognized Tamil calendar system for use in Tamil Nadu. It is calculated on the basis of the supposed year of birth of the Tamil poet-philosopher Valluvar. When comparing it with the widely used Gregorian calendar, Thiruvalluvar year will have an additional 31 years. For instance, the year 2026 in Gregorian calendar way is 2057 in the Thiruvalluvar year.

== History ==
=== Thiruvalluvar day ===
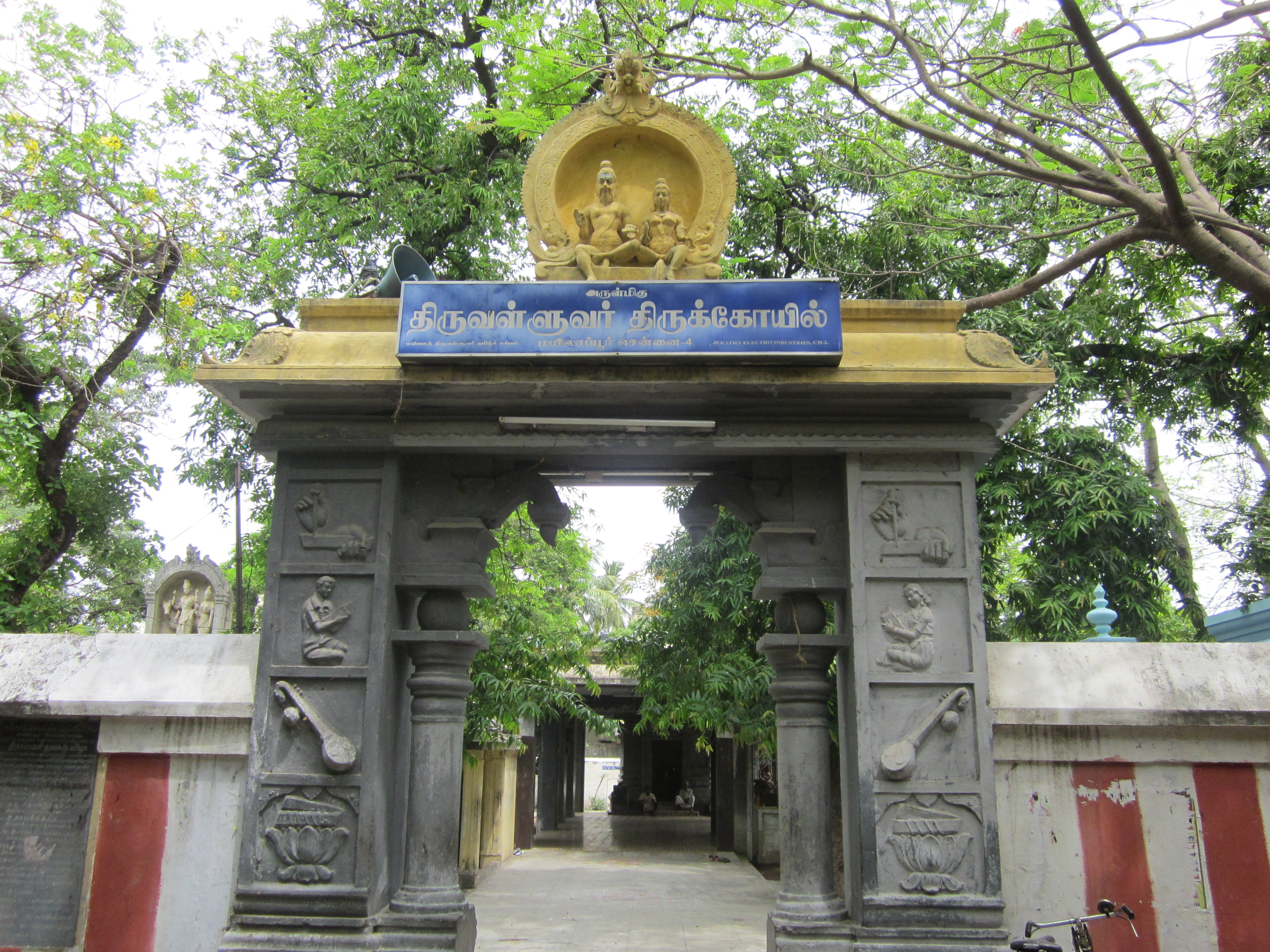
The 600-year-old Mylapore Valluvar Temple. The birthday of Valluvar celebrated here was turned as the Thiruvalluvar Day.

Valluvar was chosen as the Tamil language's greatest historical figure after Tamil scholars unanimously agreed to the proposal, chiefly owing to Valluvar's non-denominational work of the Tirukkural. As a result, a resolution to celebrate a day known as "Thiruvalluvar Day" for him by all Tamils was passed on 17 January 1935 by Kali Sivakannuswami Pillai and Padmashri V. Suppaya. Owing to their efforts, Thiruvalluvar Day Association was formed and a decision to celebrate the day in Tamil Nadu and across the globe was made. The first Thiruvalluvar Day was celebrated on 17 and 18 May 1935 in Chennai Pachaiappan College in the presence of Maraimalai Adigal, T.P. Meenakshisundaram and Thiru. V. Kalyanasundaram.

When Thiruvalluvar Day slowly went obsolete, Eelam Tamil scholar and politician K. P. Ratnam in 1954 took efforts to continue the celebration of the Thiruvalluvar Day in Tamil Nadu and foreign nations, chiefly Sri Lanka and Myanmar.

=== Thiruvalluvar Day in Tamil January ===
Pongal, celebrated during the Tamil month of Tai had been considered 'Tamilar Thirunal' among the Tamil people. As Tamilar Thirunal was on Pongal day, Tamil scholar K. A. P. Viswanatham wanted the Thiruvalluvar Day to be celebrated on the same day. In 1954, he wrote to the Tiruchi radio station and K. A. Ratnam regarding this. Since Vaikaasi anudam can vary from year to year, in 1966, the second day of June was made a government holiday to celebrate Thiruvalluvar Day every year. However, it was transferred to the first date of the month in 1971.

=== Thiruvalluvar year ===
Several anniversaries have been used to mark the years in Tamil. Notable among them is the Shaka era, Vikram Samvat and Kali Yuga. Kollam calendar was used in Kerala. But none of these were distinctive for the Tamils. In this situation, there was a need to propose a great calendar for Tamil.

Maraimalai Adigal had already proposed year 31 BCE as the birth year of Valluvar. Many Tamil scholars, including K. R. Rathinatham, who have celebrated Thiruvalluvar Thirunal in M. Karunanidhi's DMK government initiated this year as the Thiruvalluvar Year on Thiruvalluvar Thirunal, which was inaugurated by the then DMK government. In 1971, Thiruvalluvar Year was released in the Tamil Gazette and came into existence in 1972. At the Madurai World Tamil Conference in 1981, the then Chief Minister, M. G. Ramachandran, issued a formal order for official use of the same in all government documents.`

== See also ==
- Tirukkural
- Valluvar
- Tamil calendar
