= Tiruchuli =

- town
- Location in Tamil Nadu, India Tiruchuli (India)
- Coordinates: 9.534818°N 78.200769°E
- Country: India
- State: Tamil Nadu
- District: Virudhunagar

Government
  - Body: Thiruchuli Union

Languages
  - Official: Tamil
- Time zone: UTC+5:30 (IST)
- Nearest city: Madurai
- Lok Sabha constituency: Ramanathapuram
- Vidhan Sabha constituency: Thiruchuli
- Civic agency: Thiruchuli Union

Tiruchuli is a Panchayat town in the Indian state of Tamil Nadu, about 15 kilometres east of Aruppukkottai.

== Demographics ==
In 2011 the town had a population of 7,688.

== Geography ==
The River Gundar flows on the east side of the village. A large lake is situated on the west side.

== Governance ==
It is part of the Virudunagar district; the taluk falls under Ramnad M.P. and is in Tiruchuli (State Assembly Constituency).

=== Politics ===
Tiruchuli Legislative Assembly Election Results
Year	Winner	Party
2011	Thangam Thennarasu	Dravida Munnetra Kazhagam
2016	Thangam Thennarasu	Dravida Munnetra Kazhagam
2021	Thangam Thennarasu	Dravida Munnetra Kazhagam
