= Lumbini Park =

Urban park in Hyderabad, India

T. Anjaiah Lumbini Park
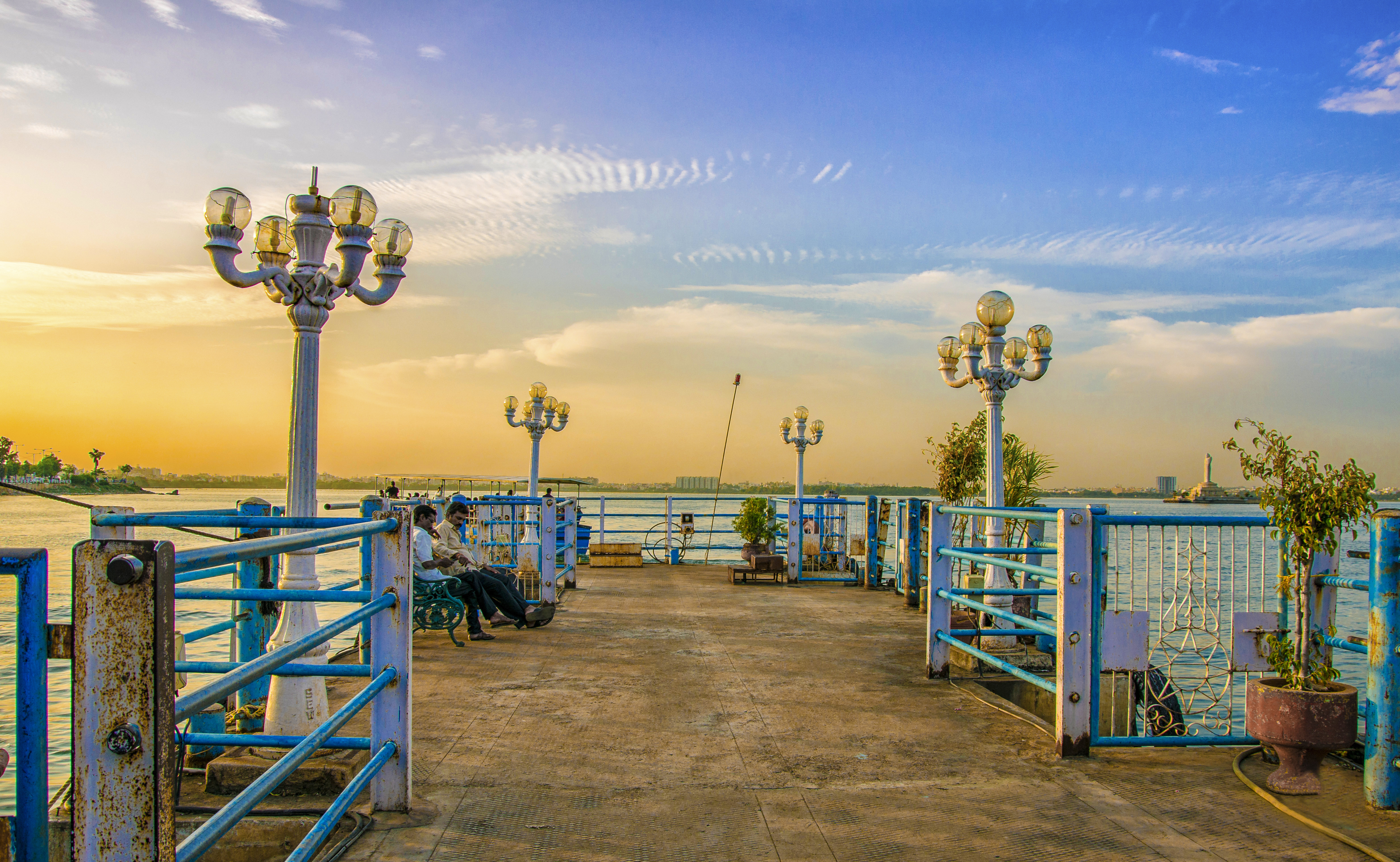
- Lumbini Park
- Interactive map of T. Anjaiah Lumbini Park
- Type: Urban park
- Location: Hussain Sagar, Hyderabad
- Coordinates: 17.410°N 78.4722°E
- Area: 3.0 ha (7.5 acres)
- Created: 1994
- Designer: Raj Expedith Associates
- Operator: Buddha Purnima Project Authority
- Status: Open all year

Lumbini Park, officially T. Anjaiah Lumbini Park, is a small public, urban park of 3 hectares (7.5 acres) adjacent to Hussain Sagar in Hyderabad, India. Since it is located in the centre of the city and is in close proximity to other tourist attractions, such as Birla Mandir and Necklace Road, it attracts many visitors throughout the year. Boating is one of the best attractions and people go to the Buddha idol placed in the middle of the Tank Band in the boats. Constructed in 1994, the park is named after the former Chief Minister of Andhra Pradesh T. Anjaiah. The park is maintained by the Buddha Purnima Project Authority of the Government of Telangana. In 2007, it was one of the targets of the 25 August 2007 Hyderabad bombings that killed 44 people.

== History ==
In 1994, Lumbini Park was constructed at a cost of ₹23.5 million (equivalent to ₹170 million or US$1.8 million in 2026) on 3 hectares (7.5 acres) of land adjacent to Hussain Sagar. In 2000, the Buddha Purnima Project Authority (BPPA) was established to maintain specially designated development areas in Hyderabad. Among tourist attractions such as Necklace Road and NTR Gardens, Lumbini Park is being maintained by BPPA. To enhance the inflow of visitors, it constructed additional facilities for laser auditorium, boating facilities among other visually appealing features such as gardens and musical fountains.

In 2006, the park was renamed after T. Anjaiah, the former Chief Minister of Andhra Pradesh.

Buddha Statue of Hyderabad in Lumbini Park

=== 2007 terrorist attacks ===
On 25 August 2007, two bomb blasts in Hyderabad killed 44 people and injured 60. One of the two blasts occurred during the evening hours in the laser auditorium that housed about 500 people at the time of the incident. After a few days of being cordoned off for crime scene investigation, the park was reopened to public after the installation of metal detectors.

== Multimedia Fountain Show ==
Emotion Media Factory installed India's first spectacular water multimedia show in Lumbini Park. The multimedia fountain show plays daily to a large audience, the installation combines a full spectrum of media elements, from dazzling laser animation, live video, stunning sound quality, rhythmic musical fountains and extraordinary beam effects, all astonishingly portrayed on one of the largest water screens in India. The elements coalesce to re-create stories and historical and cultural aspects of Hyderabad’s past, present and future, enthralling thousands of guests each night.

== Features ==
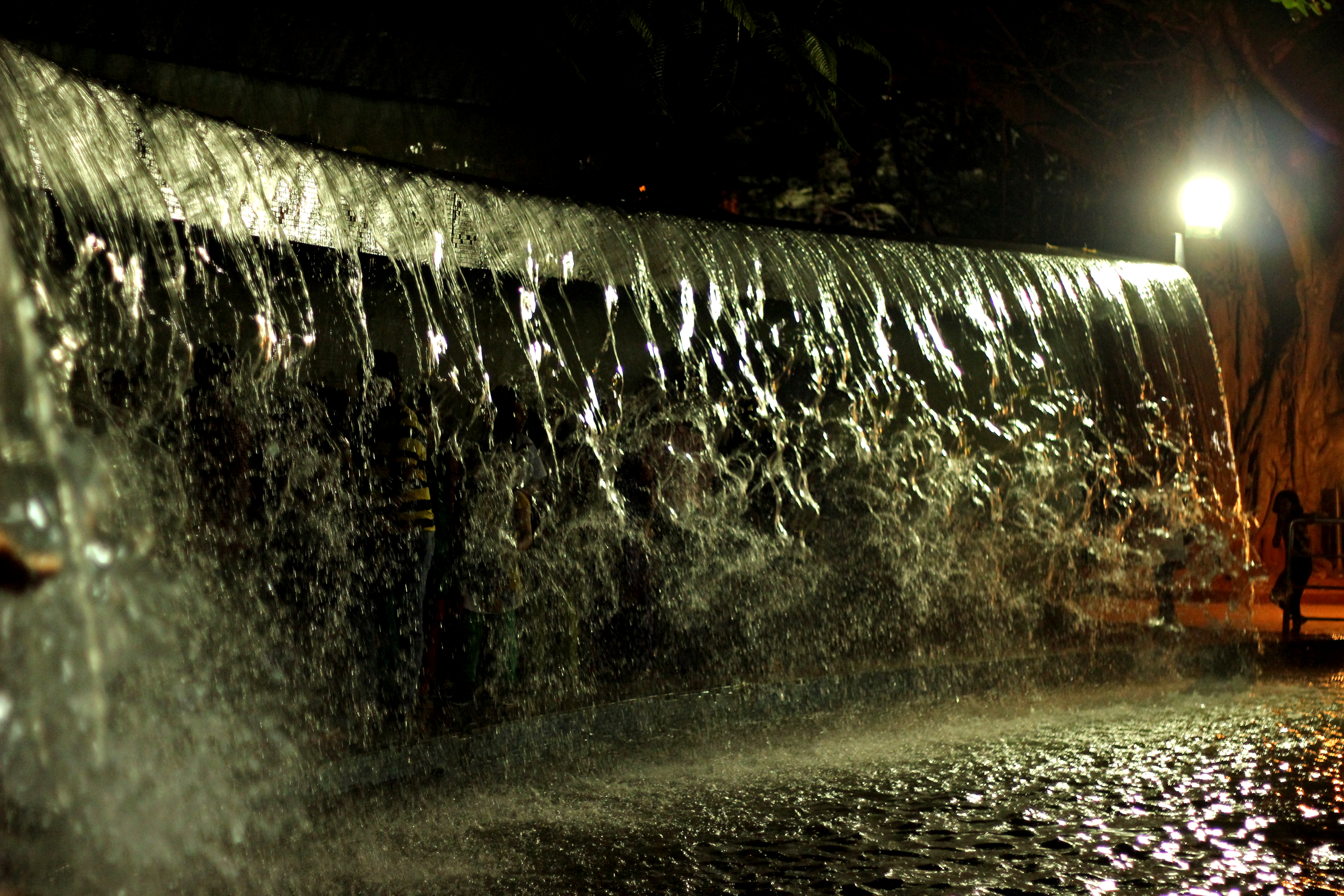
Water fall at Lumbini Park

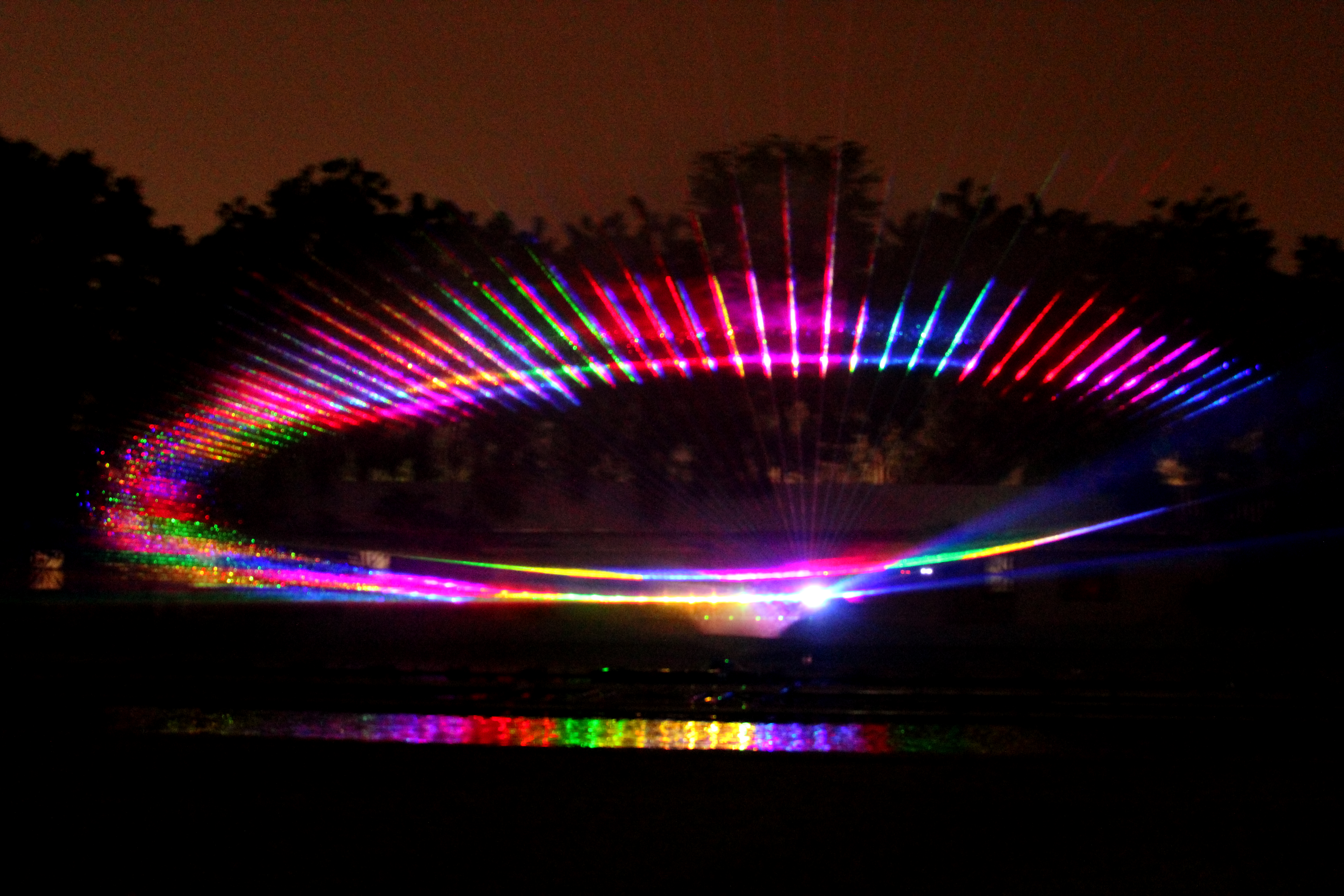
Multimedia Show at Lumbini Park

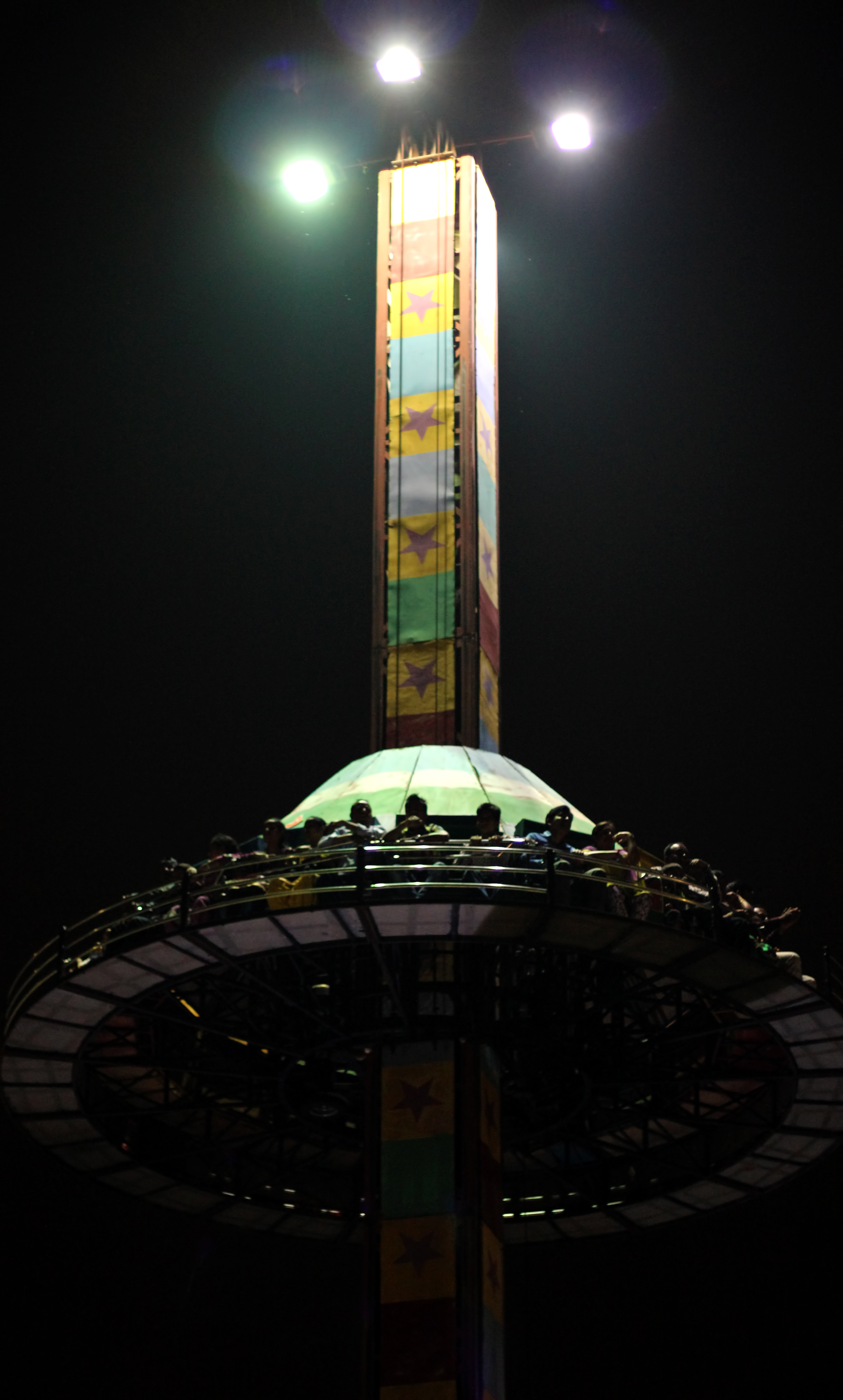
One of the ride at Lumbini Park

A parcel of 1 hectare (2.5 acres) adjacent to the park was acquired from the Andhra Pradesh Tourism Department for constructing the laser auditorium. This auditorium, believed to be the first of its kind in India, can seat up to 2000 people at a time for a show on Hyderabad's history. This was one of the initiatives for the park which was one of the key areas to support the World City strategy for Hyderabad.

== Working hours ==
The park is open to visitors on all days. A laser show is held at venue every day at 7:15 pm except weekends when it happens twice at 7:15 pm and at 8:30 pm.

== Getting there ==
Lumbini Park is near to Lakdi-ka-pul and Assembly Hyderabad metro station. New Gate, opposite Secretariat Road, Hussain Sagar, Khairtabad, Hyderabad, Telangana 500004, India.
