= S. M. Ganapathy =

Indian architect of Hindu temple (1931–2017)

S. M. Ganapathi Sthapathi
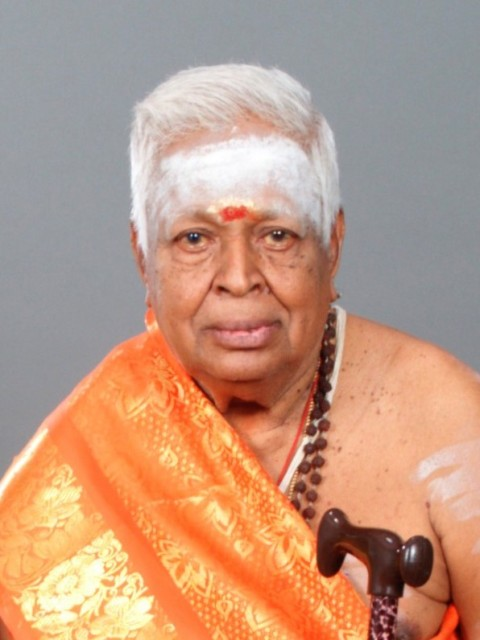
- Born: Sattanatha Muthaiya Ganapathi; 26 April 1931; Eluvankottai, Ramanathapuram district, Tamil Nadu, India
- Died: 7 April 2017 (aged 85); Chennai, Tamil Nadu, India
- Other name: S. M. Ganapathi sthapathi
- Occupations: Traditional architect Sculptor
- Known for: Hindu temple architecture
- Spouse: seethai ammal
- Children: Two sons and five daughters
- Parent(s): Muthu sthapati Gowri
- Awards: Padma Shri

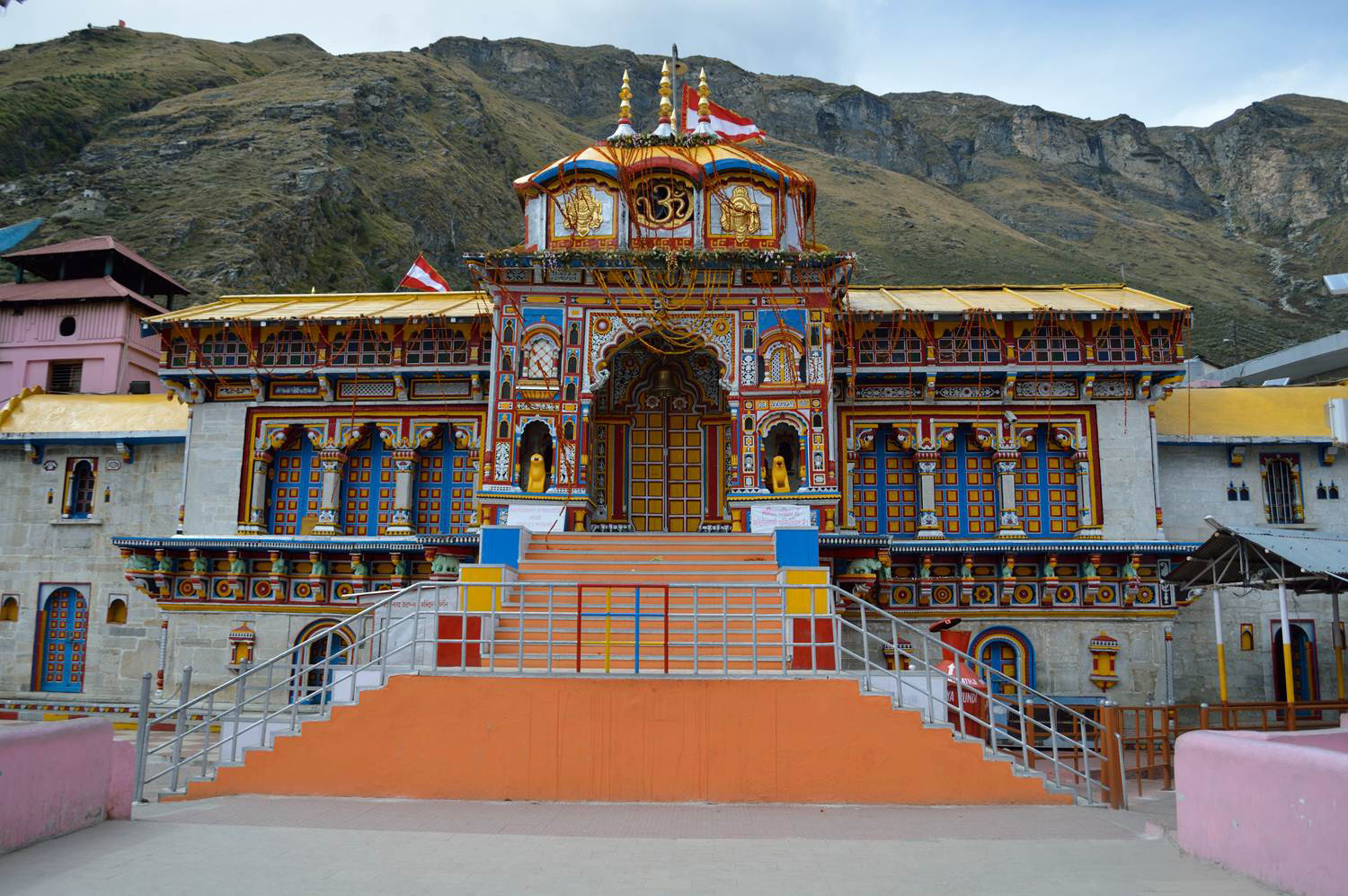
Badrinath Temple

Sattanatha Muthiah Ganapathi, popularly known as S. M. Ganapathi sthapathi, (26 April 1931 – 7 April 2017) was an Indian architect and builder (sthapati) of traditional Hindu temple architecture. He was known for his contribution in saving 48 archaeologically important temples near the Nagarjun Sagar reservoir from submergence. Orirukkai Manimantapam, Ramalayam and Kalyana Mandapam at Bhadrachalam and the Mahamantapam of the Badrinath Temple are some of his notable creations. The Government of India awarded him the fourth highest civilian award of Padma Shri in 1990.

== Biography ==
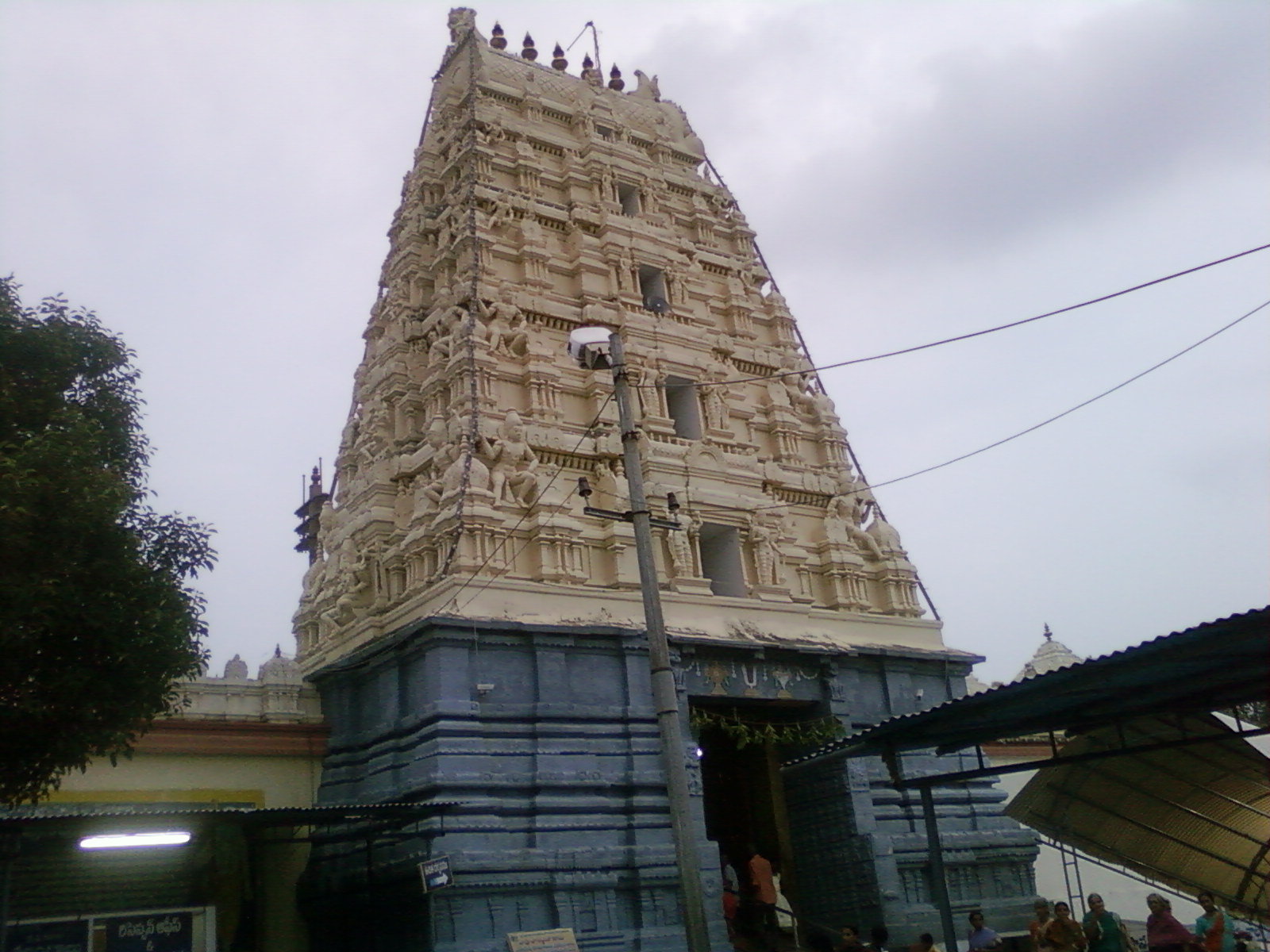
Bhadrachalam

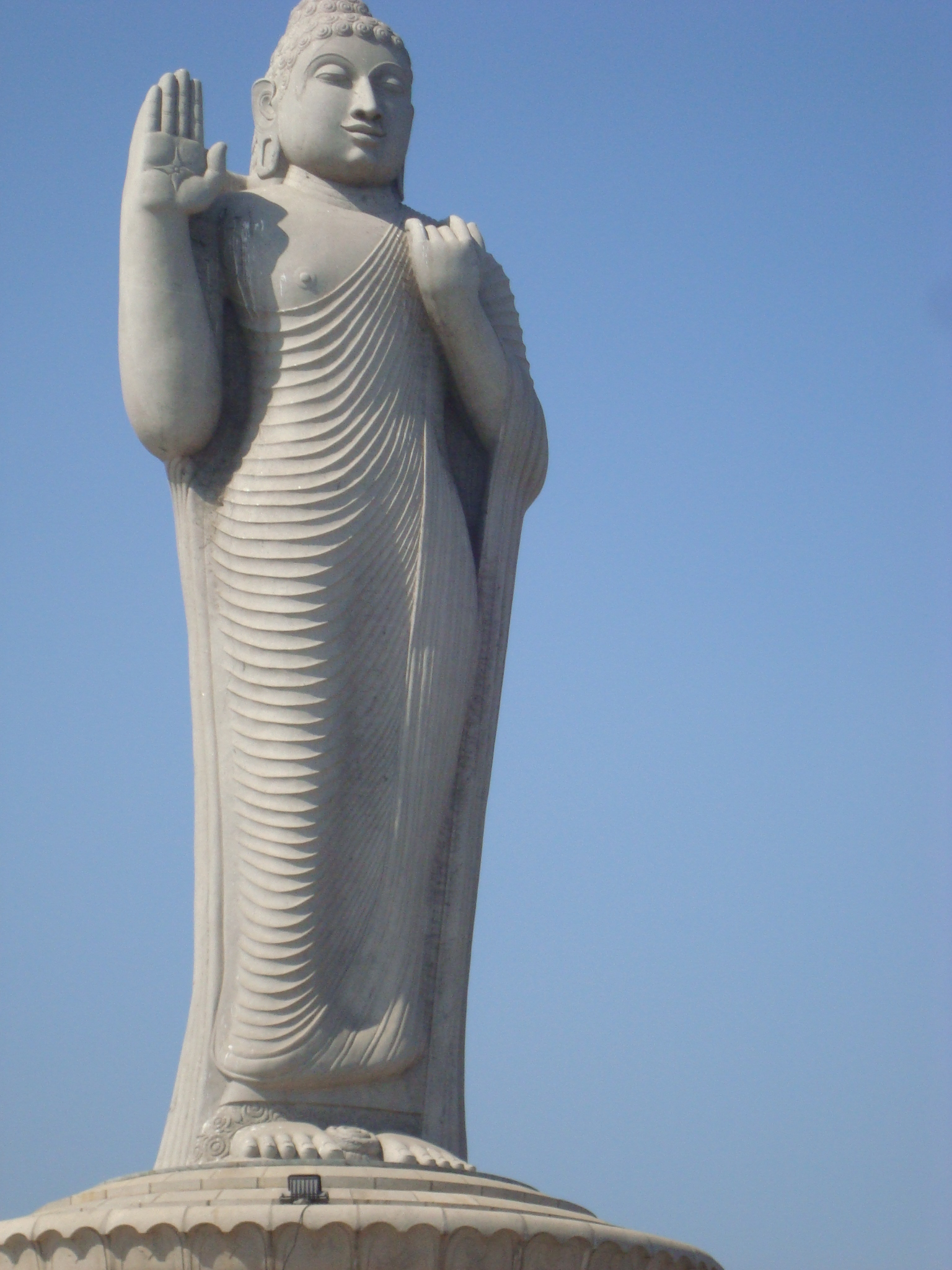
Buddha Statue Hussain sagar Hyderabad

Ganapathi Sthapathi was born on 26 April 1931 at a small village named Eluvankottai of the Ramanathapuram District, near the temple town of Rameshwaram, in the south Indian state of Tamil Nadu to a traditional architect, Muthu sthapathi, and his wife, Gowri, as one of their six children. Coming from a family of Vishwakarma Brahmin Sthapathis. he learned the art in the traditional way from his peers for 17 years before he took up his initial venture which was the dismantling and reconstruction of the Vasantha Mandapam, a work executed for the Tirumala Tirupati Devasthanams. This was followed by the construction of the Ramalayam and Kalyana Mandapam at Bhadrachalam Temple. He was the architect of the Mahamantapam of the Badrinath Temple when the Government of India under Indira Gandhi decided on the renovation of the temple. When Nagarjun Sagar dam threatened to inundate 48 temples, all over 1000 years old, Ganapathi was appointed as the head of the rescue project and he dismantled the temples and re-erected them at higher and safer locations.

The Government of Andhra Pradesh appointed him as the Chief sthapathi of the State under its Endowments Department and he continued his service as a government servant till his superannuation as the Superintending Engineer. He completed the design and construction of the Manimantapam, with 100 stone pillars, for the Kanchi Kamakoti Peetam, as a part of their project for the construction of a temple at Orirukkai, near Kancheepuram, as a memorial to the 68th Sankaracharya, Sri Sri Sri Chandrasekharendra Saraswati Swamigal. He has also taught many aspiring sthapathis, including his two sons. The Government of India included him in the 1990 Republic Day honours list for the civilian award of the Padma Shri. He has five daughters and two sons, Shankara Stapathy and Jayendra Stapathi, both known sthapathis in their own rights. His younger brother, Muthiah sthapathi, is also a renowned traditional architect and a Padma Shri award winner.

== Death ==
He died on 7 April 2017 in Chennai

== See also ==
- Hindu temple architecture
- Muthiah Sthapati
- Buddha Statue of Hyderabad
- V. Ganapati Sthapati
- Vidyasankar Sthapathy
