= V. Ganapati Sthapati =

Indian temple architect (1927–2011)

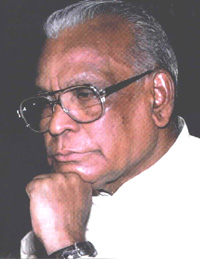
- Born: 30 September 1927; Pillayarpatti, Karaikudi, Madras Presidency, British India
- Died: 5 September 2011 (aged 84); Chennai, Tamil Nadu, India
- Known for: Architect, temple builder, sculptor, author
- Notable work: Architecture and Sculpture
- Movement: Founded the "Vaastu Vedic Trust" and "Vaastu Vedic Research Foundation" for the development and globalization of Vaastu Shastra.
- Awards: Padma Bhushan

Vaidyanatha Ganapati Sthapati (1927 – 5 September 2011) was a Sthapati (temple architect and builder) and head of the College of Architecture and Sculpture in the Vastu Shastra tradition ascribed to the sage Mamuni Mayan.

== Biography ==
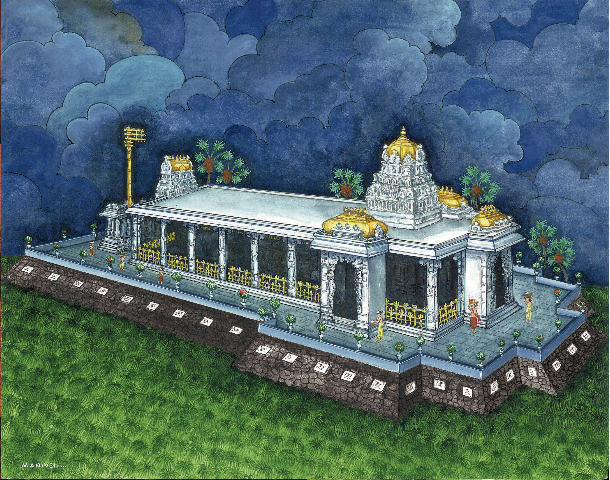
Conception for Iraivan Temple, Kauai, Hawaii, by V. Ganapati Sthapati

Sthapati was born in 1927 to sculptor Vaidyanatha Sthapati and Velammal in Pillayarpatti, a village near Karaikudi, Tamil Nadu, India.

Sthapati attended Dr. Alagappa Chettiar College, Karaikudi, and graduated with a degree in mathematics. After his graduation, he became a Sthapati at Palani Murugan Temple, Palani, Tamil Nadu, India. He resigned this post after the death of his father, who had served as principal of the School of Architecture and Sculpture at Mamallapuram from 1957 to 1960. He succeeded his father as the Principal of the Government College of Architecture and Sculpture, TN, India. From the 1980s, Sthapati campaigned to restore and elevate the status of traditional Hindu architecture in modern Indian society, by affiliating courses to the University of Madras and offering degree courses, bringing about a revival of Vastu Shastra. After retirement from government service, he established the Vaastu Vedic Trust and the Vaastu Vedic Research Foundation, aimed at research, development, and globalization of Vaastu Shastra. He was also the head of the professional guild named "V. Ganapati Sthapati & Associates."

== Major works ==
=== Architecture and sculpture ===
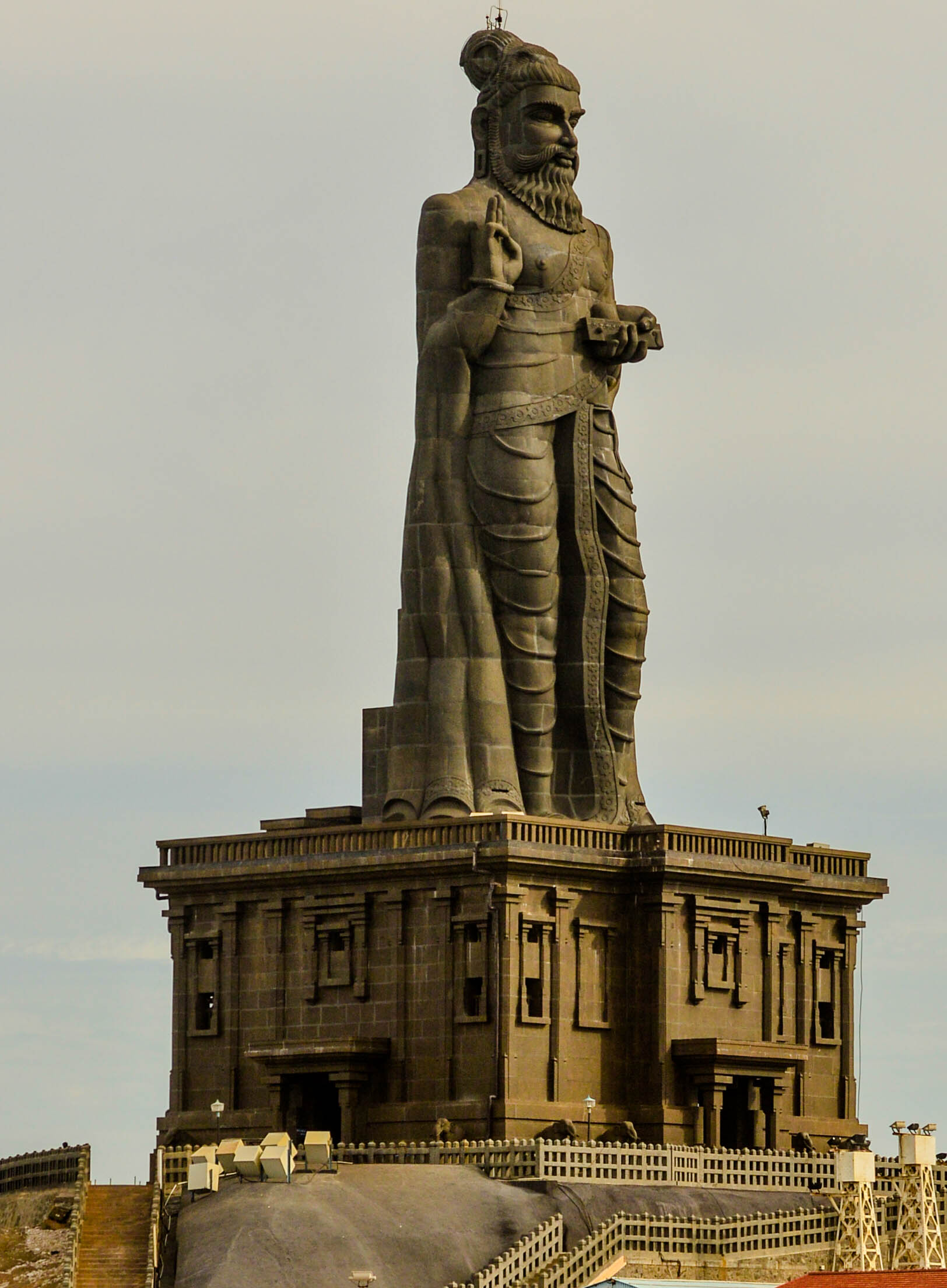
Thiruvalluvar Statue.

Sthapati served as architect for several buildings and sculptures, including the following:

- Sculpture of Tamil poet and saint Thiruvalluvar—Thiruvalluvar Statue at the southern tip of India at Kanyakumari, TN, India (measuring 133 feet (40.5 m) in elevation and weighing 4000 tons).
- Design and construction of university buildings including the Administrative block and library for Tamil University in Tanjore.
- Design and Construction of Valluvar Kottam in Chennai, TN, India.
- Granite sculpture of the Kannagi—heroine of the Tamil epic Silappathikaram, erected in an Art Gallery in Poompuhar, Chennai, TN, India.
- The Rajagopuram of Sri Rama Temple and Sri Ganesh Shiva Durga Temple at The Hindu Temple of Greater Chicago complex Lemont, Illinois, United States.
- Sri Murugan Temple, Nadi-Fiji islands.
- The San Marga Iraivan Temple, Kauai, Hawaii.
- Sri Shiva Vishnu Temple – Maryland
- Design of Great Buddha statue, Bodh Gaya.

Projects in India and other countries.

== As an author ==
Sthapati has authored a number of books on the science and technology of Vastu Shastra and has conducted over 80 seminars. He formed a publishing house called Dakshinaa Publishing house to publish and market books related to Vastu Shastra and architecture. His critically acclaimed book, Building architecture of Sthapatya veda attracted the attention of Scholars, architects and engineers of India and abroad.

- Building architecture of Stha-patya Veda. Dakshinaa Pub. House. 2005.
- Building Architecture of Sthapatya Veda, Illustrations Volume II
- The scientific edifice of Brihadeeswara temple, Tanjore Tamilnadu. Chennai, India: Dakshinaa Pub. House. OCLC 297209860.
- Significance of vimānam & gopuram. Chennai, India: Dakshinaa Pub. House. OCLC 297209865.
- Shiva Vishnu Temple Complex: Concept and Design
- Quintessence Of Sthapatya Veda
- The Scientific Edific of Brihadeeswara Temple, Tanjore, Tamilnadu
- Who Created God?
- The Colossal Statue Of Ayyan Thiruvalluvar

He has authored countless other books including Iconometry, Temples of Space Science: The Building Architecture of Sthapatya Veda and Commentary on Mayan's Aintiram.

== Awards ==
Sthapati has earned a number of titles and awards including and not limited to:

- Padma Bhushan (the third highest civilian award in India) in 2009.
- Doctorate Degree conferred by the Maharishi Mahesh Yogi Vedic University in the Netherlands – 1995
- Honorary fellowship by the Indian Institute of Architects in 1993
- The National Award for Master Craftsmanship from the President of India – 1973

=== Other awards ===
- Kalaignar Award (Murasoli Trust)Presented by Dr. Kalaignar on 29 January 2005
- Muttiah Chettiar Award
- Kapilavanar Award – Thirukovilur

== Gallery ==
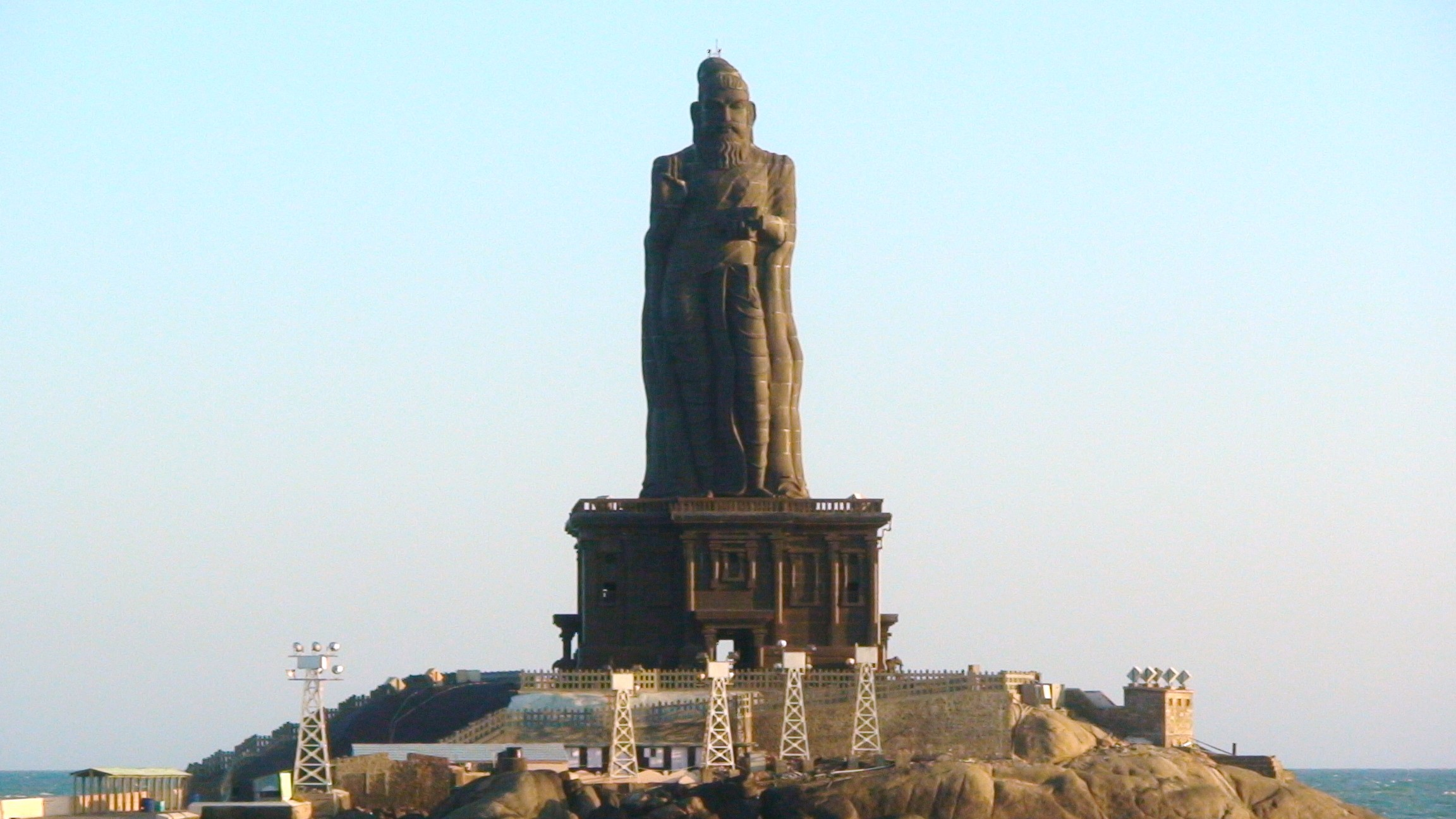
133-foot-tall sculpture (40.5 m.) of the Tamil poet and saint Thiruvalluvar Statue, in Kanyakumari, India.

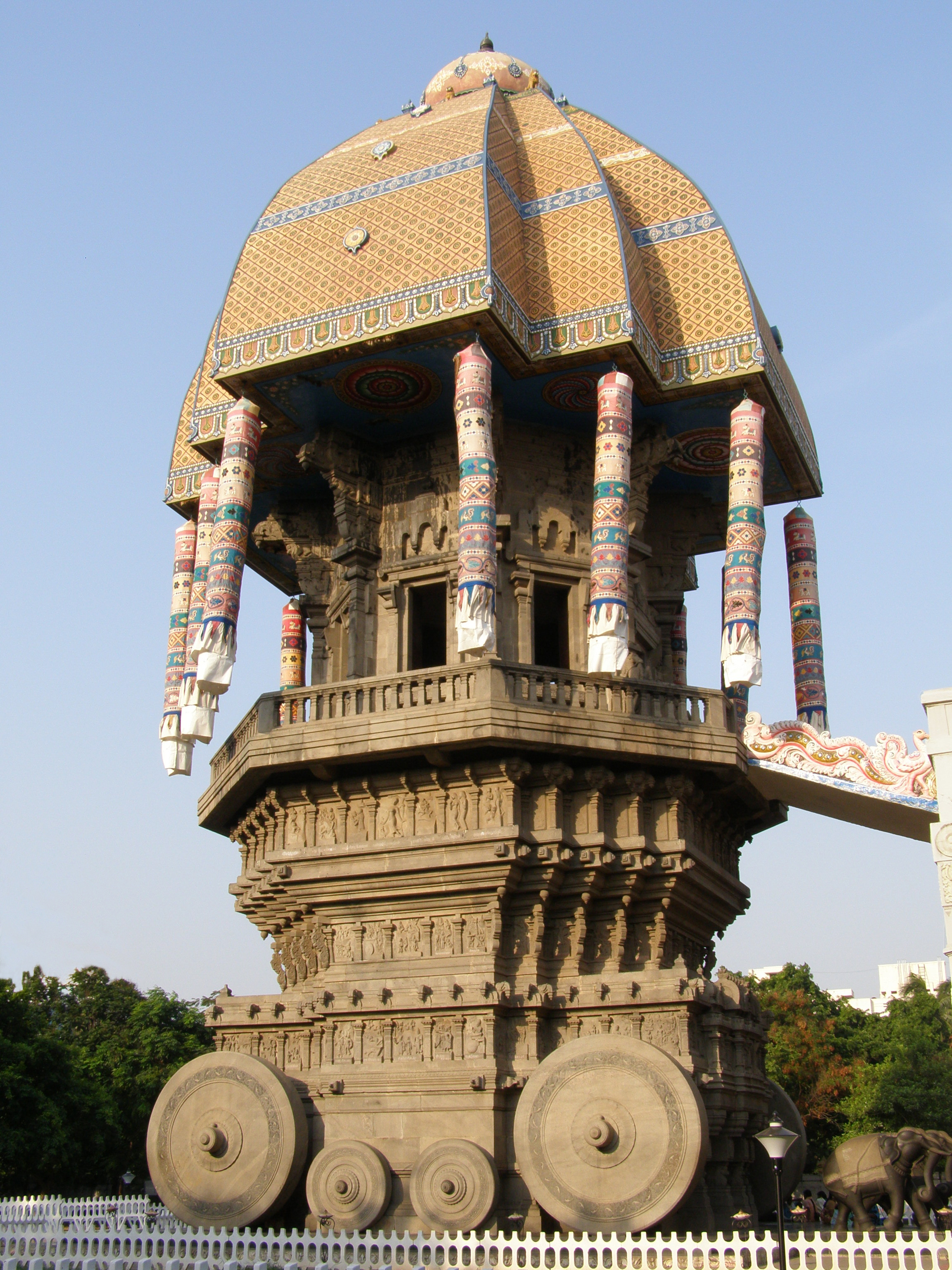
Valluvar Kottam, designed and constructed by V. Ganapati Sthapati, in Chennai, India

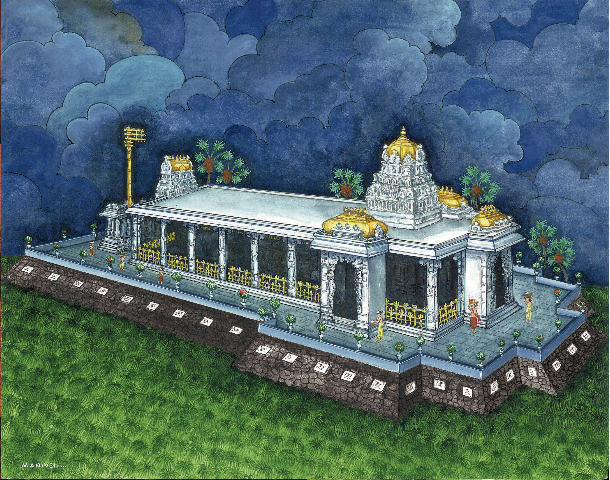
Artist's conception for Iraivan Temple, on the Hawaiian island of Kauai.

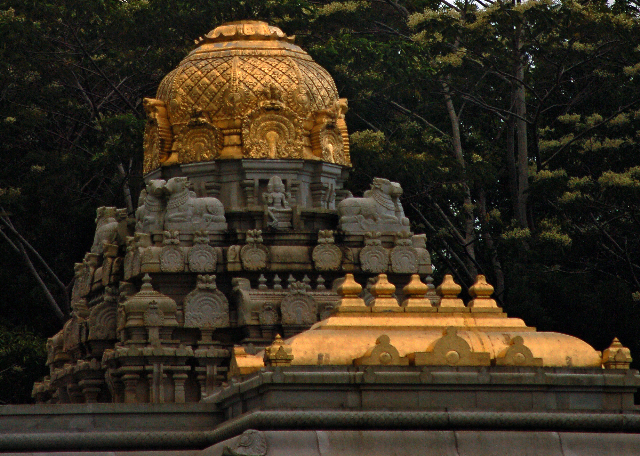
Detail of Iraivan Temple.

== Bibliography ==
- Subramaniam, T.S. (20 February 2009). "Sculpting a success story". The Hindu. Archived from the original on 23 February 2009.

== See also ==
- Hindu temple architecture
- S. M. Ganapathy
- Muthiah Sthapati
- Vidyasankar Sthapathy
