= Muthiah Sthapati =

Indian sculptor, architect and builder

- Born: Muthaiah Muthu Sthapati; 14 December 1941 (age 84); Eluvankottai, Ramanathapuram District, Tamil Nadu, India
- Occupations: Sculptor; Traditional architect
- Known for: Hindu temple architecture
- Children: 2 sons,3 daughters
- Parent(s): Muthu Sthapati; Gowri
- Awards: Padma Shri

Muthiah Sthapati is an Indian sculptor, architect and builder of Hindu temple architecture. He is known for the design and construction of several temples in the UK and US, including the Hindu Temple of Minnesota. He is the creator of the 67.5-foot Buddha statue at Rambadagalla Vidyasagara Temple, in Sri Lanka, reported to be world's largest Buddha statue in the seated (samadhi) position. The Government of India awarded him the fourth highest civilian award of Padma Shri in 1992.

== Early days ==
Muthiah was born on 14 December 1941 at a small village named Eluvankottai of the Ramanathapuram District, near the temple town of Rameshwaram, in the south Indian state of Tamil Nadu to a traditional architect, Muthu Sthapati, and his wife, Gowri, as one of their six children. Apart from learning the art the traditional way from his peers, he underwent formal training in temple architecture, sculpting and town planning at Mamallapuram Sculpture School from 1957 to 1961.

Muthiah is married and has two sons, both of whom are traditional architects and sculptors. His eldest brother, S. M. Ganapathy Sthapati, is a sthapati and also a Padma Shri recipient.

== Career ==
=== Temples ===
He has designed and constructed Hindu temples across the globe, 32 of them in the US itself. The Sri Mahalaxmi Temple for Laxmi Narayana Trust in London, Minnesota Hindu Temple, Arupadai Veedu Temple complex, Chennai, Sri Meenakshi Sundareswra Temple, Uttaraswami Malai, New Delhi, Sri Utthara Chidambara Nataraja Temple, Satara and temples at Houston, Los Angeles, Chicago, San Francisco, Pittsburgh, Nashville, Boston, Atlanta, New York, Moundsville, Louisville, Miami, Oklahoma, Memphis, Dallas and Poughkeepsie are some of his notable constructions.

=== Sculpture ===
He was the sculptor of the 60-foot granite statue of Shri Krishna at Birla Industrial & Technological Museum, Kolkata. On 30 April 2015, another of his oversize creations, a 67.5-foot Buddha statue was unveiled at Rambadagalla Vidyasagara Temple in Sri Lanka. The statue, with its pedestal measuring 7.5 feet, has a total height of 75 feet and is considered as the largest Buddha Samadhi sculpture in the world. A 32-foot Hanuman statue at Nanganallur, Chennai and a Sankaracharya statue at Enathur in Kancheepuram are also his creations.

He has also founded a sculptor's training studio, Swarnam Institution, and a business house, Swarnam Exporters, the latter an export house involved in the export of sculptures and idols.

== Awards and recognitions ==
The Government of India honoured him with the civilian award of the Padma Shri, in 1992.

== See also ==
- Hindu temple architecture
- V. Ganapati Sthapati
- S. M. Ganapathy
- Vidyasankar Sthapathy
