= Buddha Statue of Hyderabad =

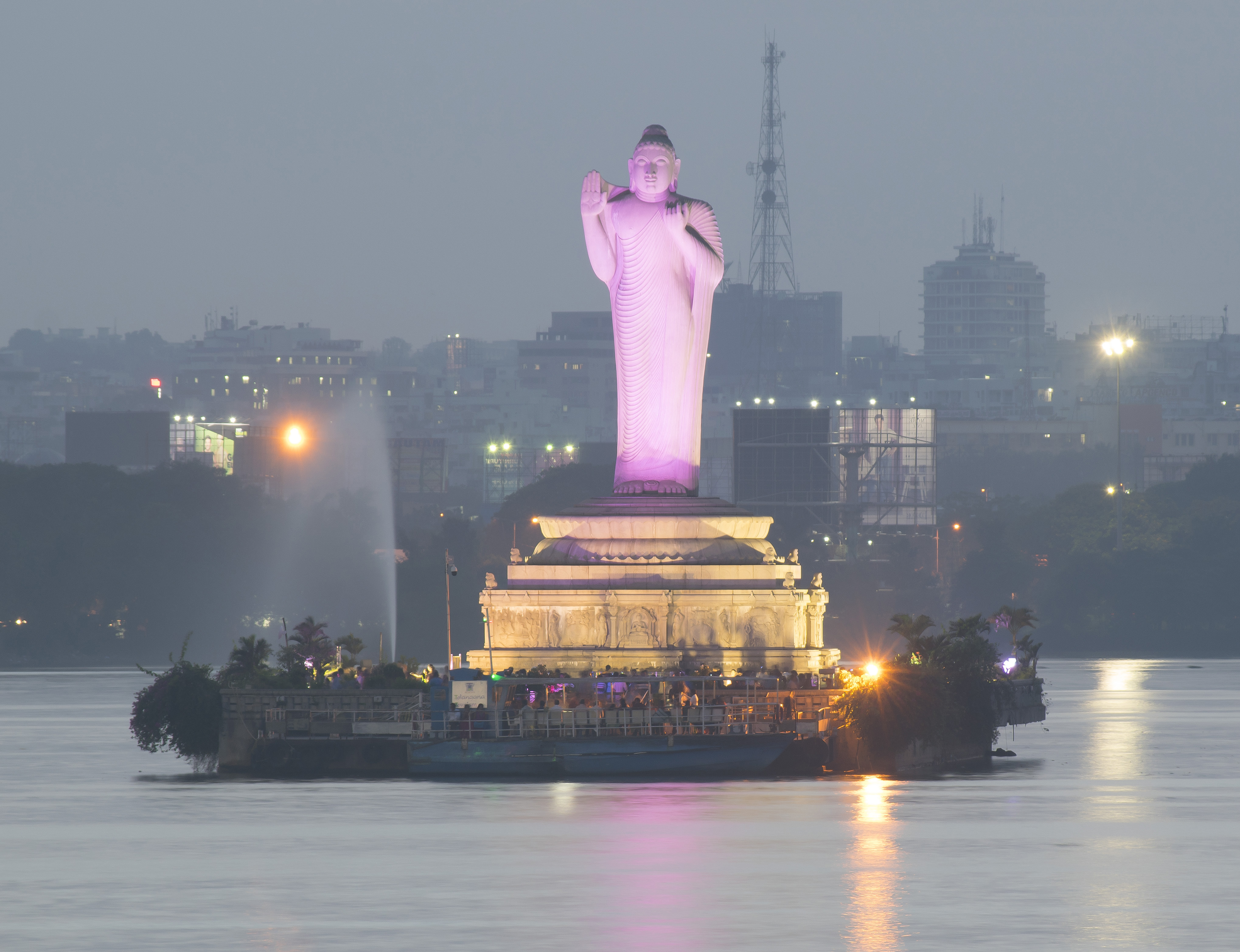
- Standing Buddha in Abhaya Mudra

- Location of Buddha Statue in Hussain Sagar Buddha Statue of Hyderabad (Telangana) Buddha Statue of Hyderabad (India)
- Interactive map of Buddha Statue of Hyderabad
- 17°24′56″N 78°28′30″E
- Location: Hussain Sagar, Hyderabad, Telangana, India

History
- Dedicated: 1 December 1992; 33 years ago
- Founded: N. T. Rama Rao

Site notes
- Height: 58 feet (18 meters)
- Sculptor: S.M.Ganapathi Sthapathi
- Governing body: Buddha Purnima Project Authority, HMDA

The Buddha Statue of Hyderabad is a monolith located in Hyderabad, Telangana, India. It is the world's tallest monolith of Gautama Buddha, erected on Gibraltar Rock in the middle of Hussain Sagar lake.17°15′29.64″N 78°40′47.51″E

== History ==
Between 1983 and 1989, N. T. Rama Rao served as the Chief Minister of Andhra Pradesh. During his tenure, he spent large sums to erect several statues of people from the region's political and religious history. During his visit to New York, he saw the Statue of Liberty and was inspired by the efforts to restore it. He said, "I wanted something like that great place to visit... That would have been my contribution to society."

Rama Rao chose to depict Gautama Buddha because "he was a humanitarian who told the whole truth to the people. It is our pride." After a long search, he found a solid white granite rock near Raigiri, Bhuvanagiri (Yadadri Bhuvanagiri district) on a mountainside 46 km outside Hyderabad. In October 1985 Rama Rao inaugurated work on structure. For over a year, hundreds of labourers helped the temple architect and builder S.M.Ganapathi Sthapati create the statue. After five years and the expenditure of US$3 million, the statue stood at 58 feet (18 m) and weighed 350 tons, making it the world's tallest monolithic statue of the Buddha. A concrete platform measuring 15 feet (4.6 m), now referred to as the "Rock of Gibraltar," was constructed in the middle of Hussain Sagar to aid in erecting the statue. The roads of the city were also widened for this purpose.

This statue is located at Lumbini Park in the Hussain Sagar Island can be reached by boat in 15 minutes. The statue is near to Lakdi-Ka-Pul, Khairatabad and Assembly Hyderabad metro stations.

== Accident ==
Then government of Andhra Pradesh led by N. T. Rama Rao was ousted in 1989. By the next year, the statue was ready for erection. ABC Limited, a local company, was given the responsibility of transferring the statue onto the concrete platform. Using a trailer vehicle, the statue was brought to the shore of Hussain Sagar. On 10 March 1990, company workers shifted the statue on top of a barge. After traveling only 100 yards (91 m), the statue tipped over and fell into the lake. The accident resulted in the deaths of 10 people.

After a two-year salvage operation, the statue was pulled out of the lake. On 1 December 1992, the statue was installed on the platform successfully. In 2006, the Dalai Lama consecrated the statue after performing a ritual.

== Gallery ==
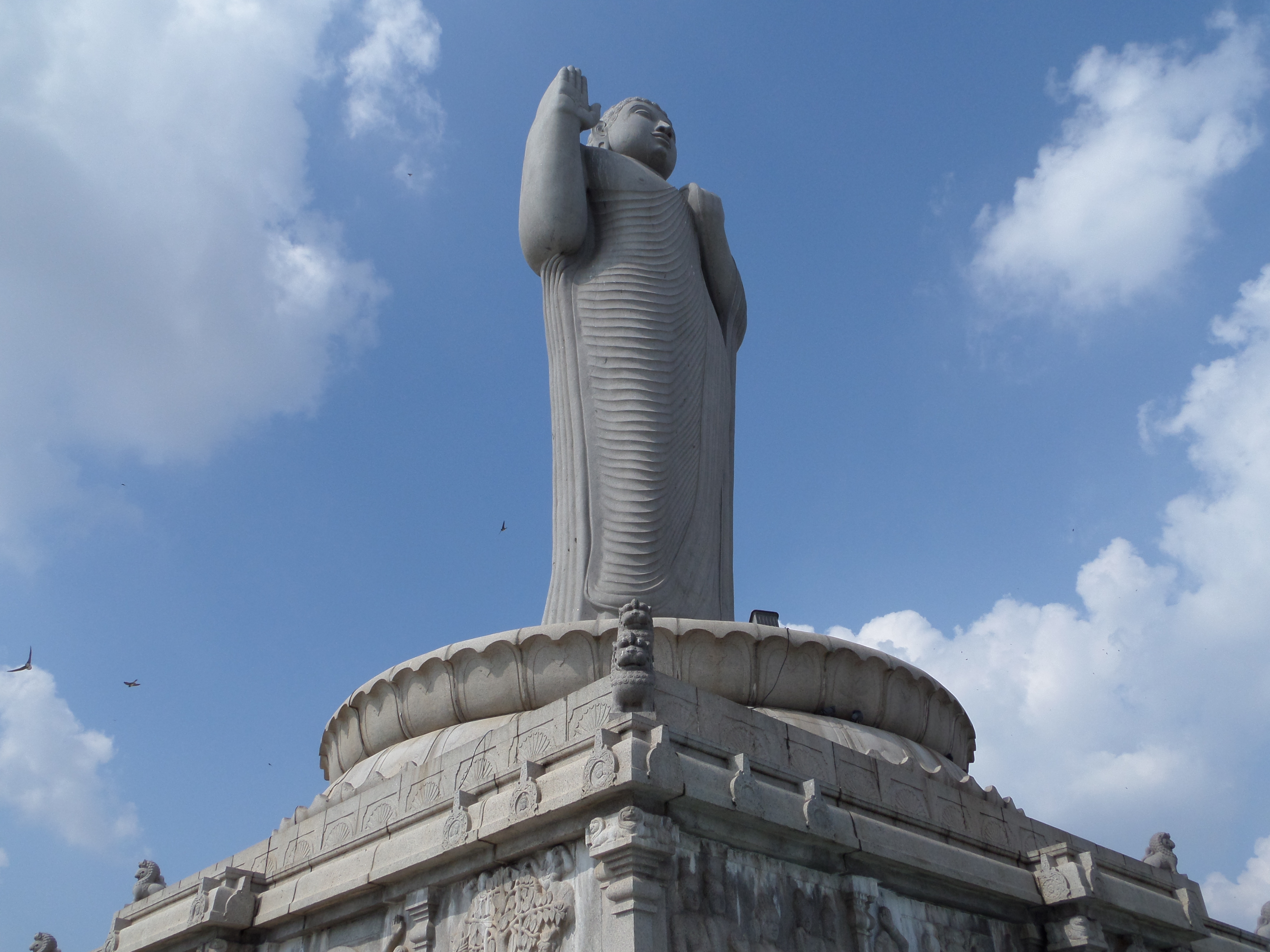
Standing Buddha in Abhya mudra

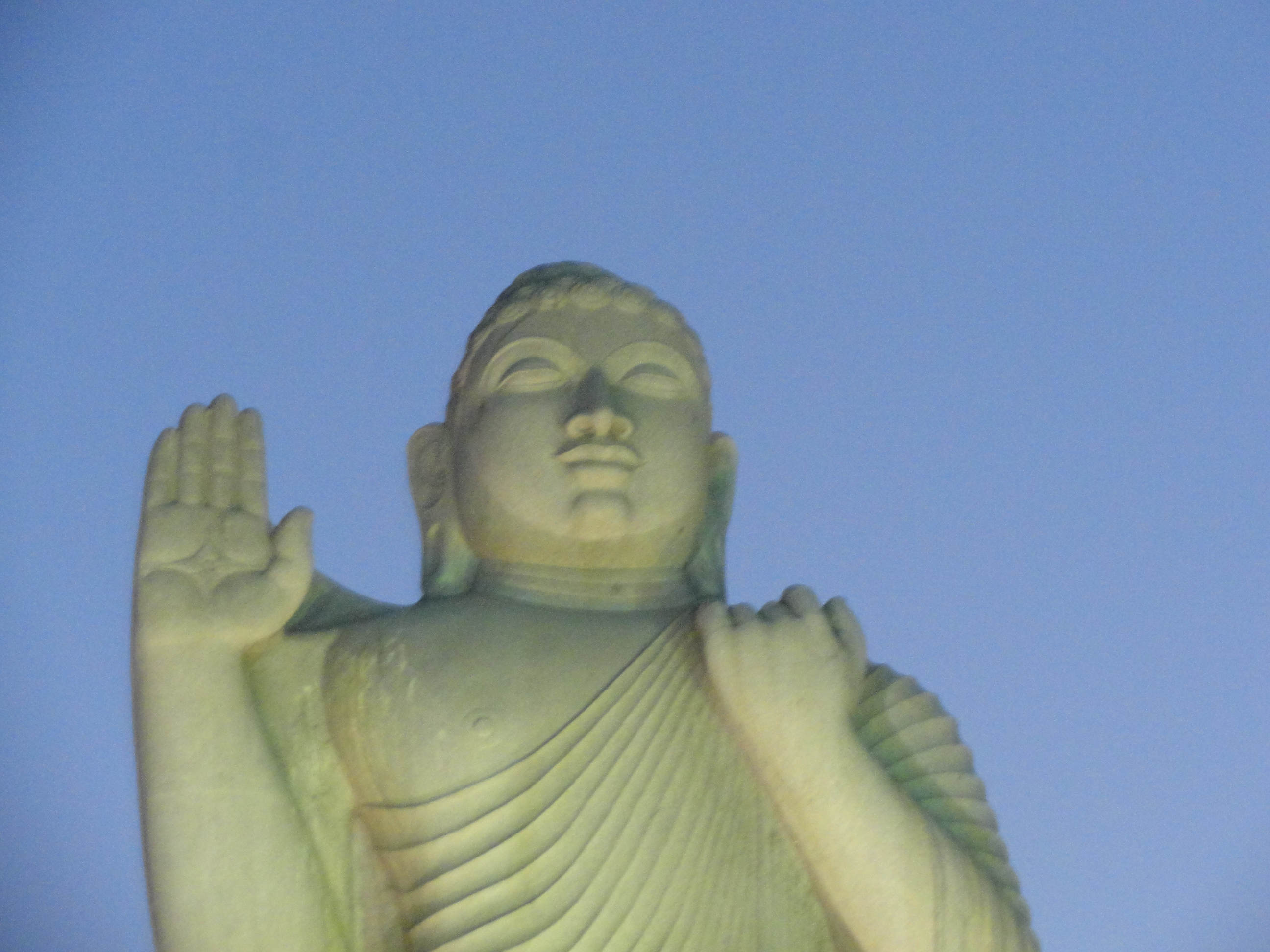
Closeup view

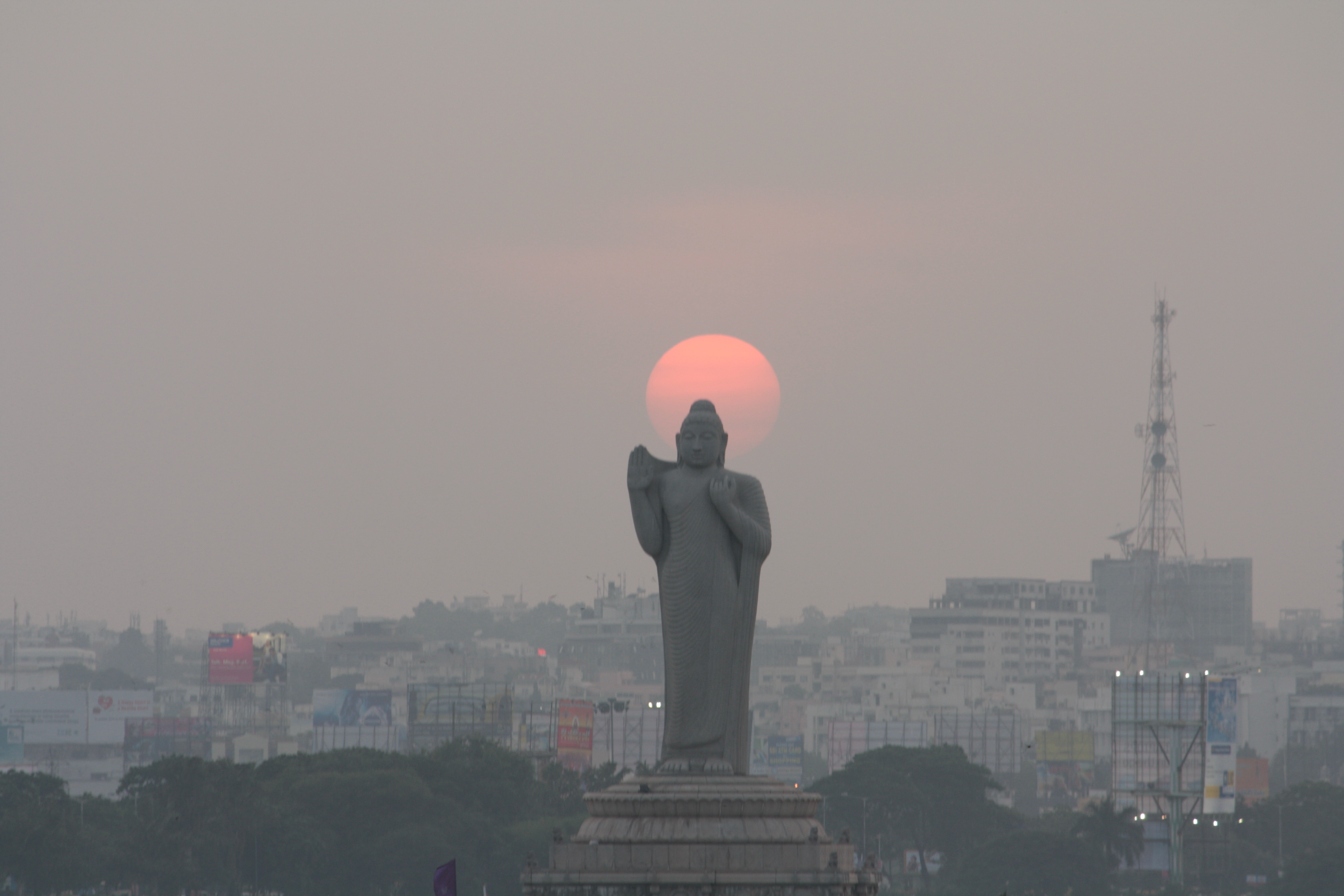
Sunset on Buddha Statue, Hussain Sagar

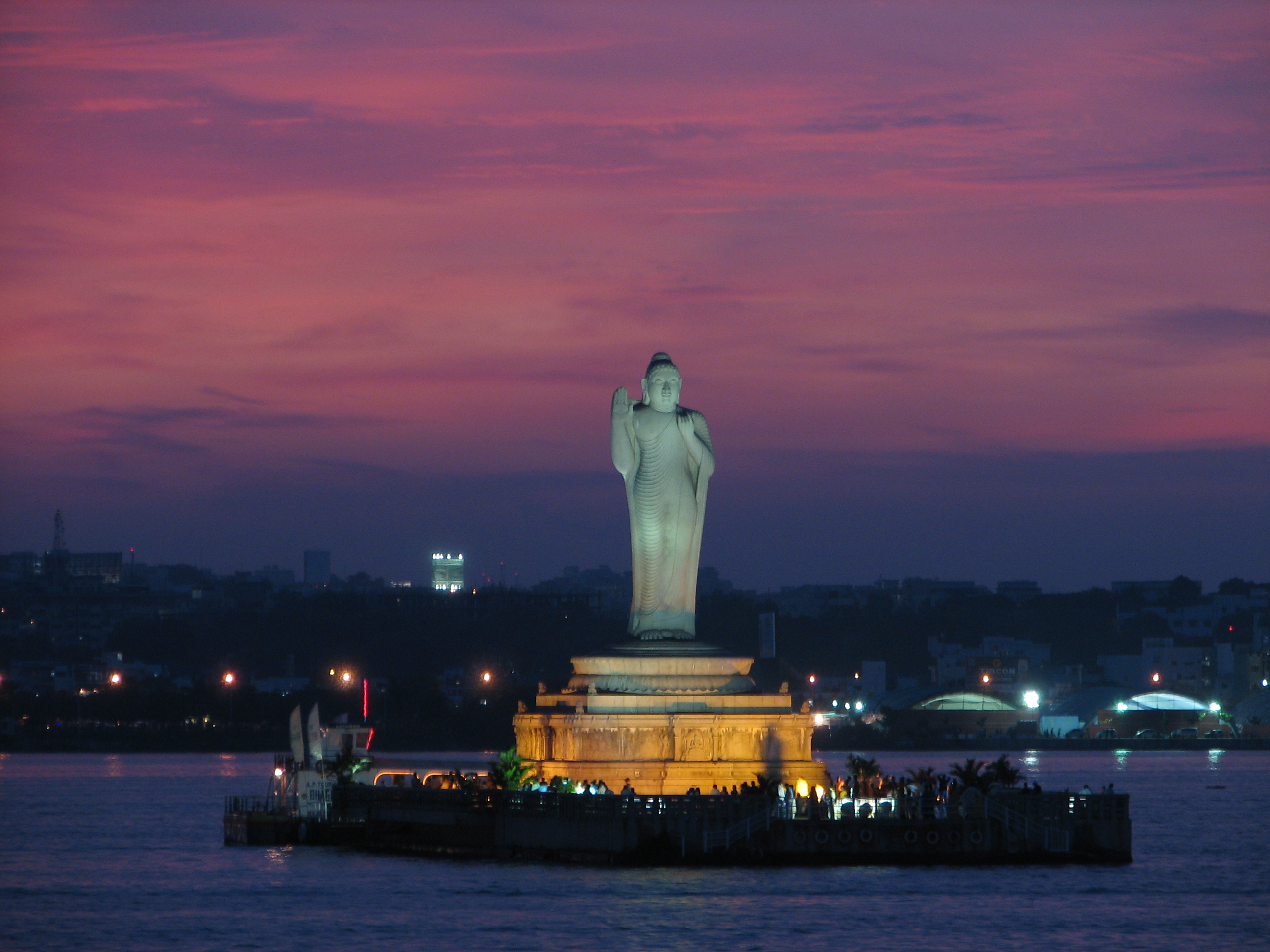
Evening View

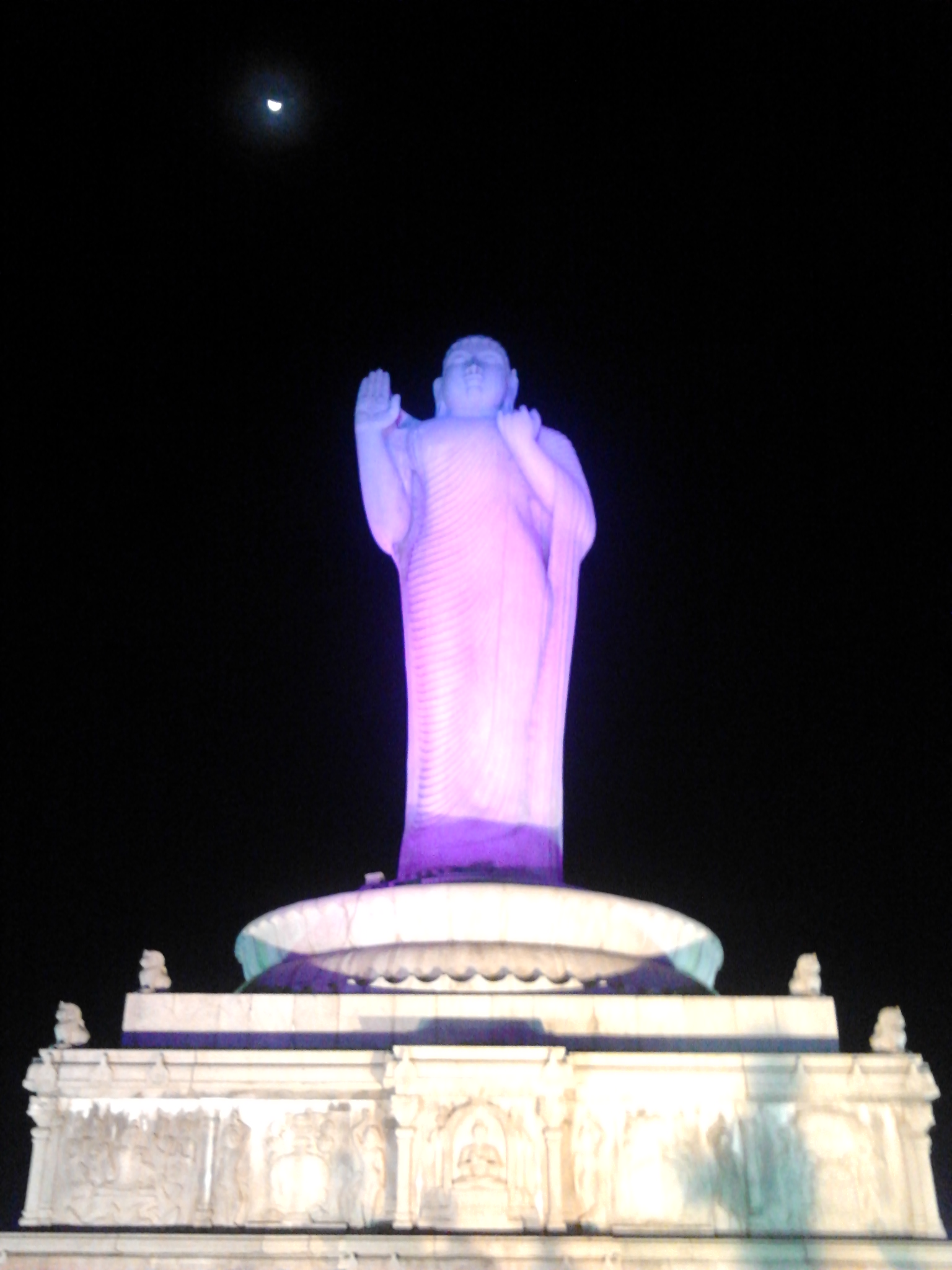
Night View on a moon day

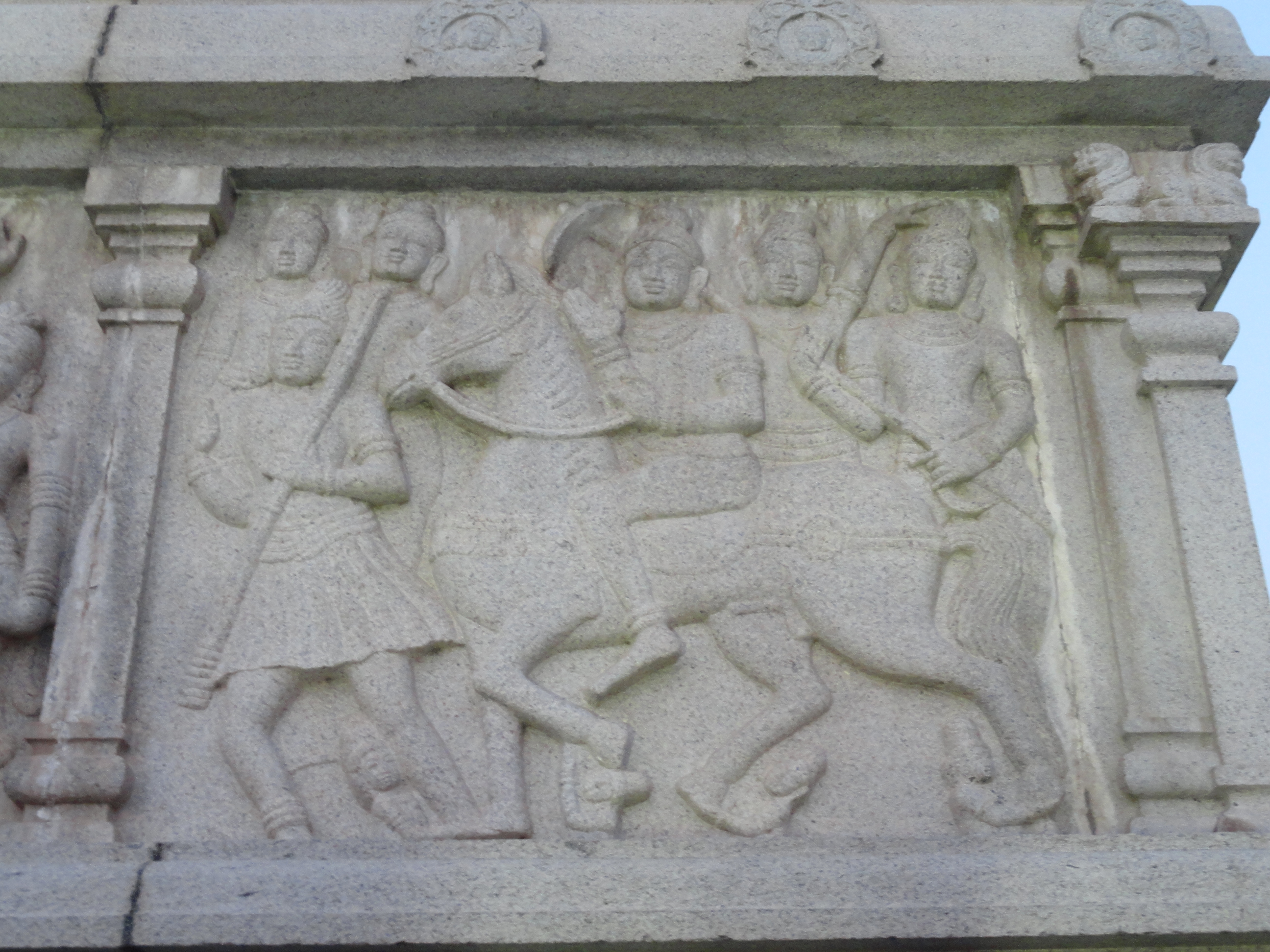
A sculpture on the basement of Buddha statue.

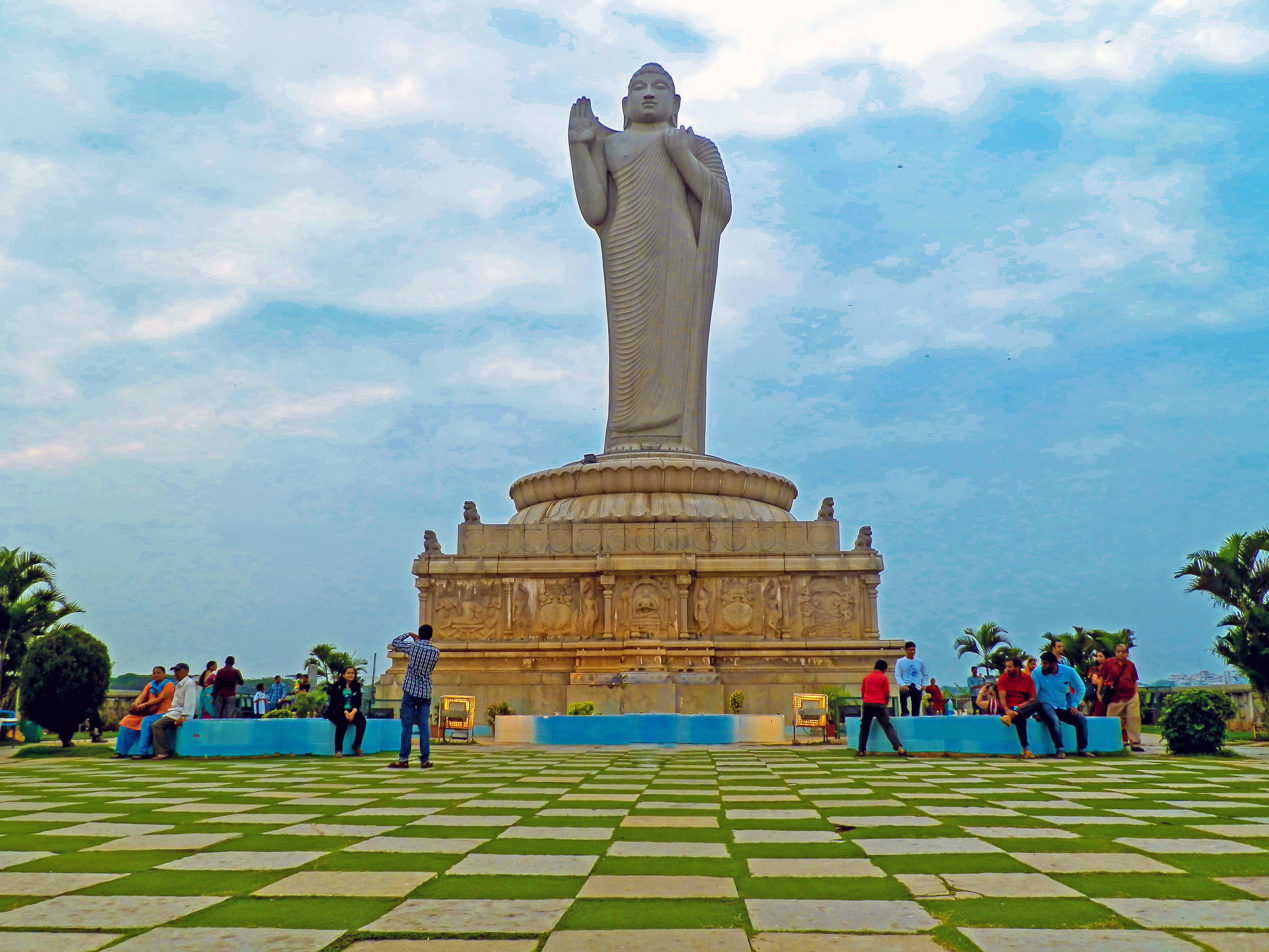
Buddha statue at Hussain sagar

== See also ==
- Statue of Ahimsa
- List of tallest statues
