= Jalavihar =

Indian Waterpark

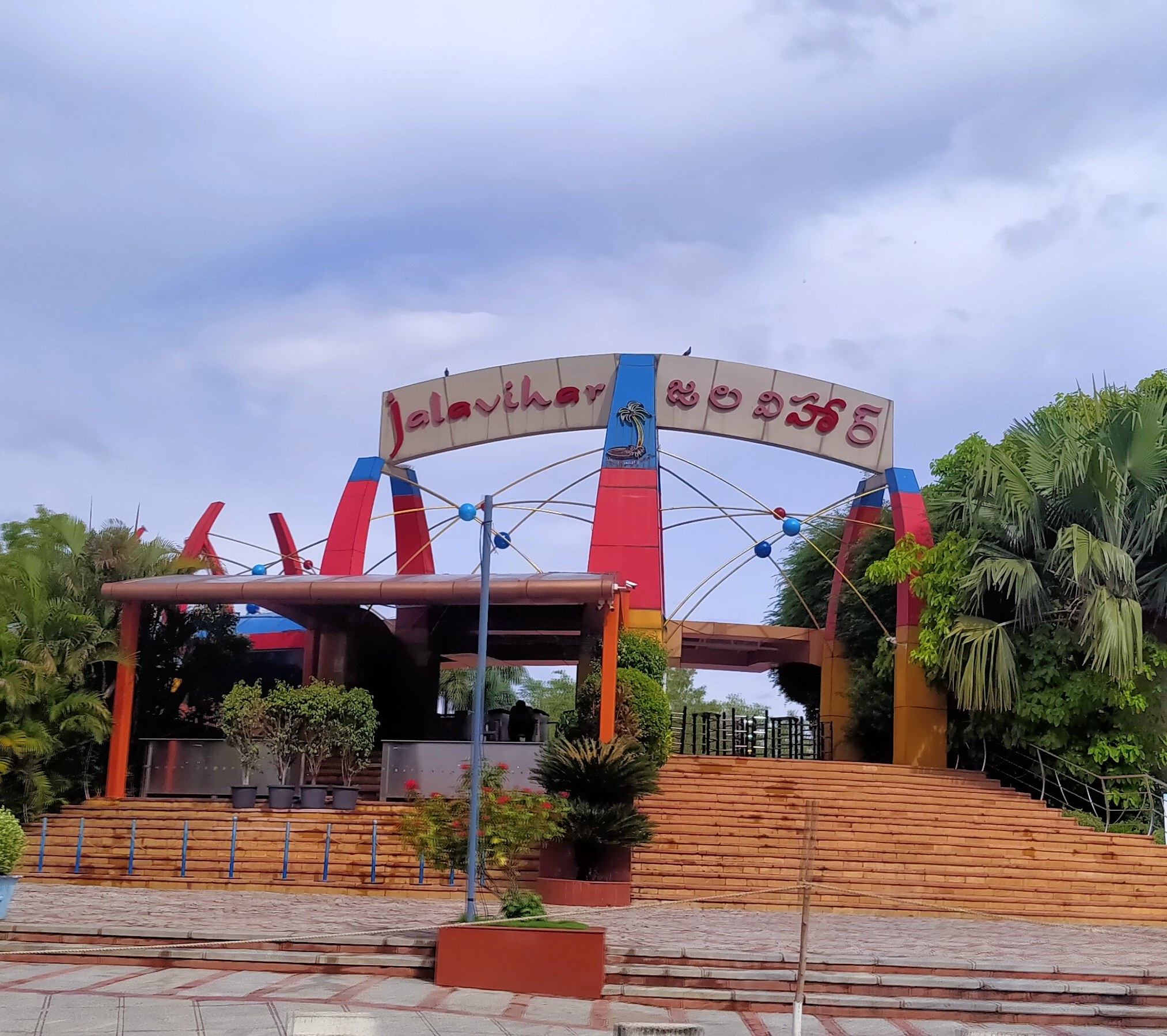
- Interactive map of Jalavihar
- Location: Hyderabad, Telangana, India
- Coordinates: 17°22′08″N 78°28′51″E
- Opened: 20 May 2007
- Owner: N V Rama Raju
- Operating season: All year
- Area: 12.5 acres (5.1 ha)
- Website: jalavihar.in

Jalavihar is a waterpark located in Hyderabad, Telangana, (India) within an area of about 12.5 acres (5.1 ha). Located beside Sanjeevaiah Park and along the Hussain Sagar lake, the park was inaugurated on 20 May 2007.

== Background ==
R. J. Rao, a non-resident Indian, and a group of individuals funded the ₹220 million (US$2.3 million) in a public-private partnership model with the local tourism department. The department sanctioned 12.5 acres (5.1 ha) of land on Necklace Road abutting the Hussain Sagar lake for this project.

Although the land was allotted by the local government headed by N. Chandrababu Naidu in 2000, the work was stalled because of land encroachment and ownership issues. Further to this, a probe was initiated by the local government on the method of allocation of projects. India's apex court gave the go ahead to the project in mid-2006 on the basis of sanction of the local pollution control board and the regional high court.

Because of the profitability of public-private partnership model such as this one, the local government proposed to continue the trend in 2010.

== Facilities ==
The 18,000-square-foot (1,700 m^{2}) wave pool, the largest in the country, can accommodate about 1,000 people at a time. The constructed area comprised only 10% of the total area of the park. Proper fencing was provided along the park to prevent littering around the Hussain Sagar lake. The park consists of two main zones – entertainment and party. The entertainment zone has water sports, wave pool, dry rides, mini train and food courts. The party zone contains open lawns that can accommodate about 2,000 people.
