= Hussain Sagar =

Heart-shaped lake in Hyderabad, Telangana, India

- Aerial view of Hussain Sagar

- Location within Hyderabad Location within Telangana Location within India
- Location: Hyderabad, Telangana, India
- Coordinates: 17.42477°N 78.47332°E
- Type: Artificial lake
- Basin countries: India
- Max. length: 3.2 km (2.0 mi)
- Max. width: 2.8 km (1.7 mi)
- Surface area: 4.4 km^{2} (2 mi^{2})
- Max. depth: 32 ft (9.8 m)
- Surface elevation: 1,755 ft (535 m)
- Islands: Gibraltar rock (artificial)
- Settlements: Greater Hyderabad

Hussain Sagar (alternatively referred to as Tank Bund; Telugu pronunciation: [ɦusen sɑːgər]) is a heart-shaped lake in Hyderabad, Telangana, India, built by Ibrahim Quli Qutb Shah in 1562. It is spread across an area of 5.7 square kilometres (2.2 sq mi) and is fed by the River Musi. A large monolithic statue of the Gautama Buddha, erected in 1992, stands on Gibraltar Rock in the middle of the lake. The lake separates the city centre of Hyderabad from the neighbourhood of Secunderabad. The maximum depth of the lake is 32 feet (9.8 m).

== History ==
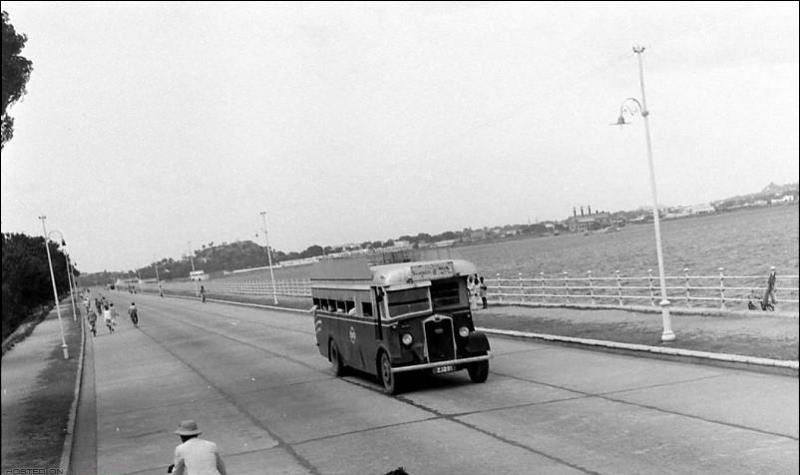
A view of NSR bus on Tank Bund Road c. 1932

Hussain Sagar was built across a tributary of the Musi River in 1562 AD by Ibrahim Quli Qutb Shah. The lake was named after Hussain Shah Wali, who was the Master of Architecture in the Kingdom. It is an artificial lake that holds water perennially fed by canals from Musi river. Hussain Sagar was the main source of water supply to Hyderabad before Himayat Sagar and Osman Sagar were built on river Musi.

Hussain Sagar Map

The Buddha statue was chiselled out of a white granite rock, weighing 450 tons. It was carved by 200 sculptors for two years. The statue was transported to Hyderabad in November 1988. After initial problems, the statue was erected on 12 April 1992 on a red lotus pedestal.

== Landmarks and attractions ==
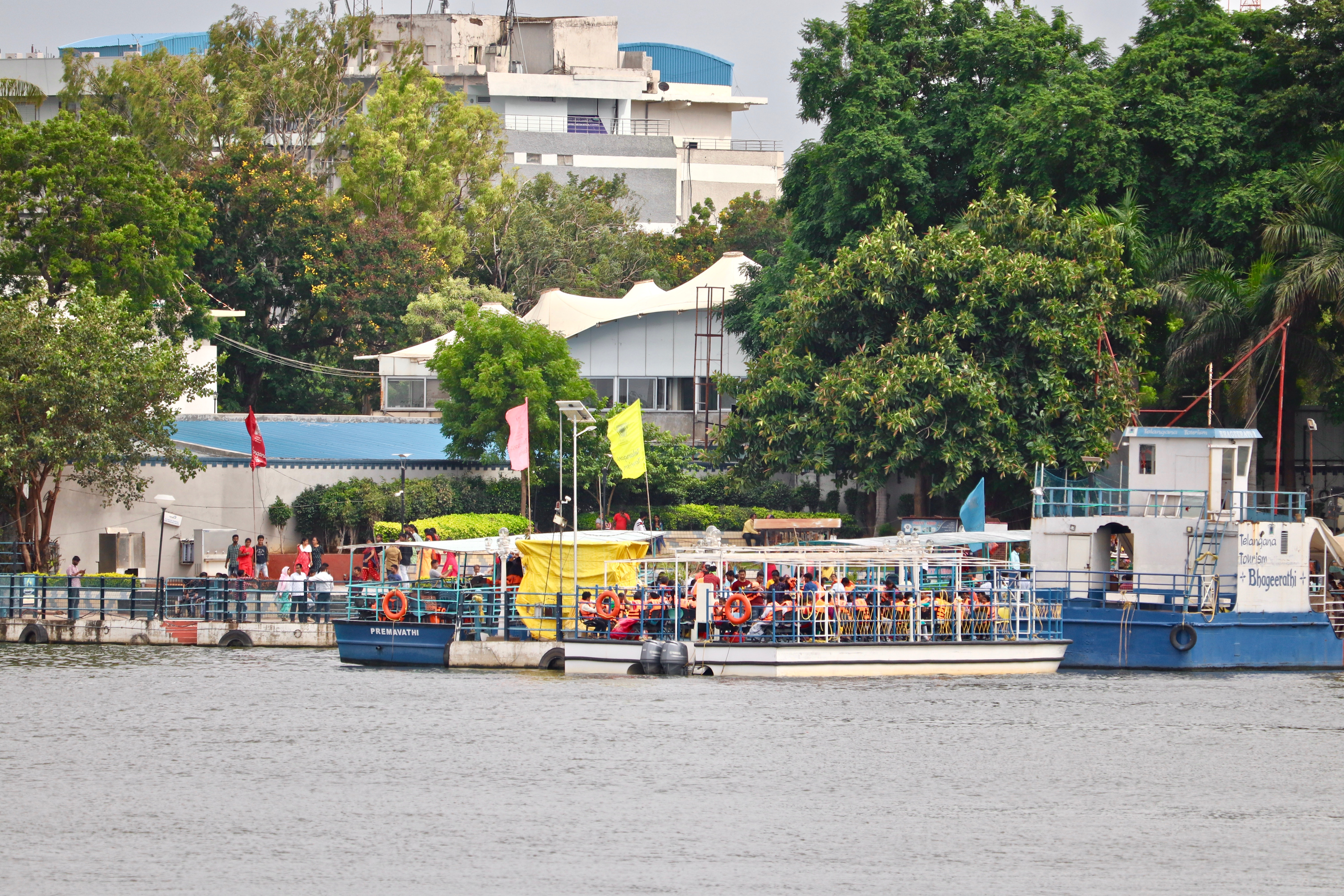
Boating point in the lake

The road on the Tank Bund was widened in 1946 when Sir Mirza Ismail was the prime minister of Hyderabad Deccan. Further widening and beautification of the Tank bund took place during 1987-88 by the then Chief Minister of Andhra Pradesh N.T.Rama Rao with the addition of fountains with dancing waters, coloured lights at night and bronze statues of renowned personalities.

=== Hussain Sagar Thermal Power Station ===
Hussain Sagar Thermal Power Station was built in 1920 by the 7th Nizam Mir Osman Ali Khan on the banks of Hussain Sagar lake. It was the first thermal power station of South India. It supplied power to the twin cities of Hyderabad and Secunderabad from 1920 to 1983.

=== Patton tank ===
A Pakistani M47 Patton tank is a war trophy given to the 54th Infantry Division which had disabled it during the Battle of Basantar in Pakistan, during 15–17 December 1971. It was given to the city by the battalion after the India Pakistan war of 1971.

=== Buddha statue ===
An 18-metre high monolithic statue of Gautam Buddha towers over the lake from atop the Rock of Gibraltar. The idea was a part of the Buddha Poornima project in 1985 by N. T. Rama Rao. The statue was chiselled out of a white granite rock, weighing 450 tons. It was carved by 200 sculptors for two years. The statue was transported to Hyderabad in November 1988. After initial problems, the statue was erected on 12 April 1992 on a red lotus pedestal.

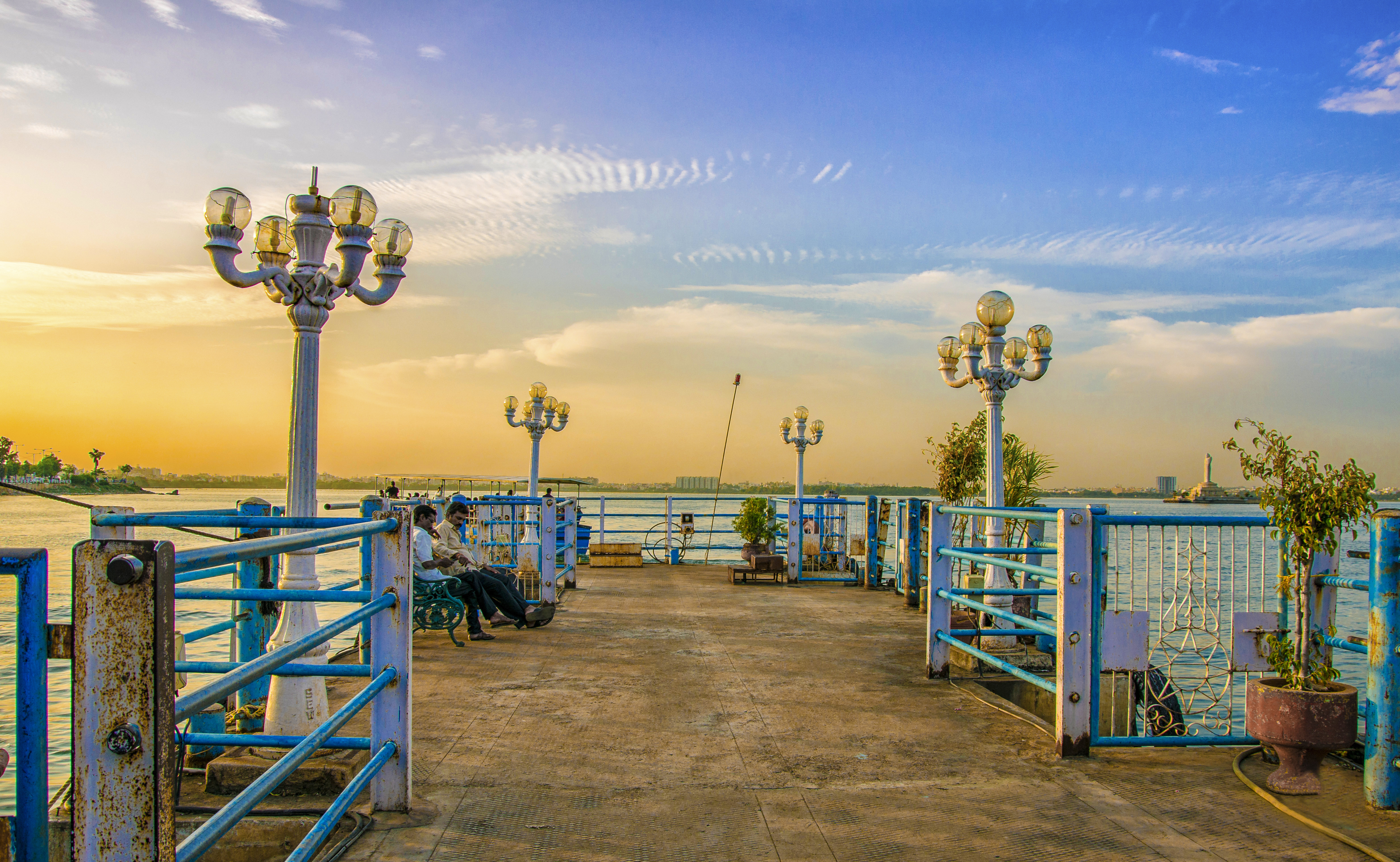
Lumbini Park Jetty, Hyderabad

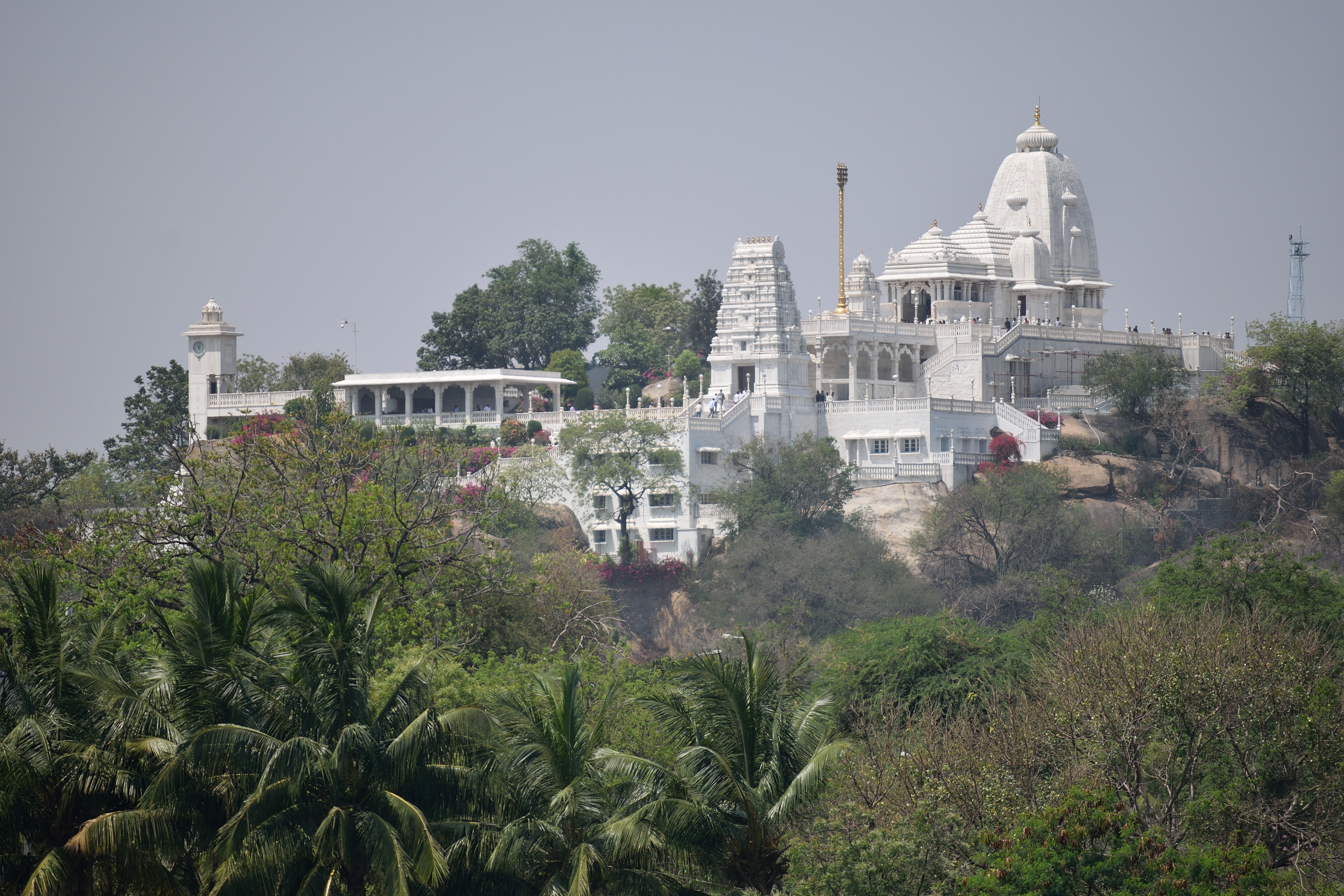
Birla Mandir in Hyderabad

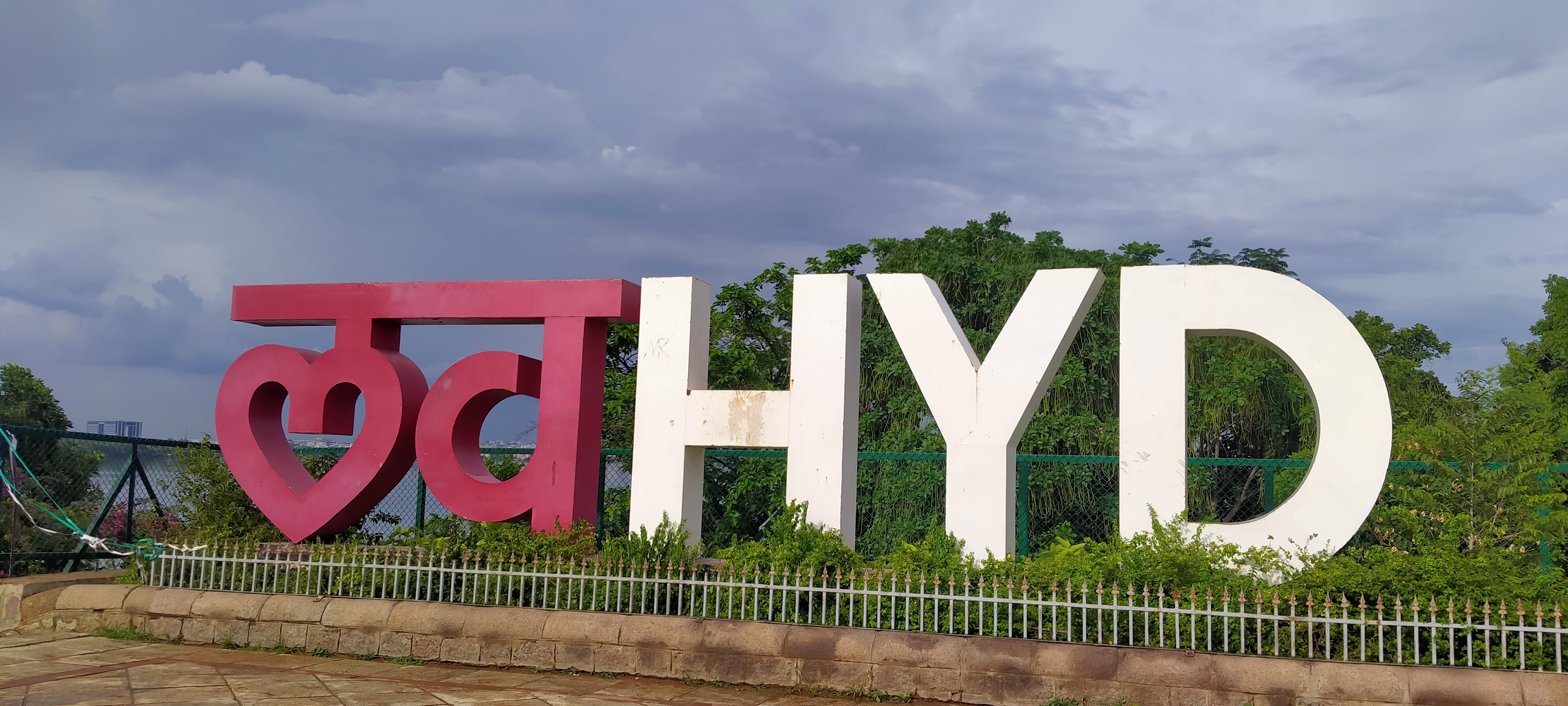
Love Hyderabad Sculpture at People's Plaza on the banks of the picturesque Hussain Sagar lake

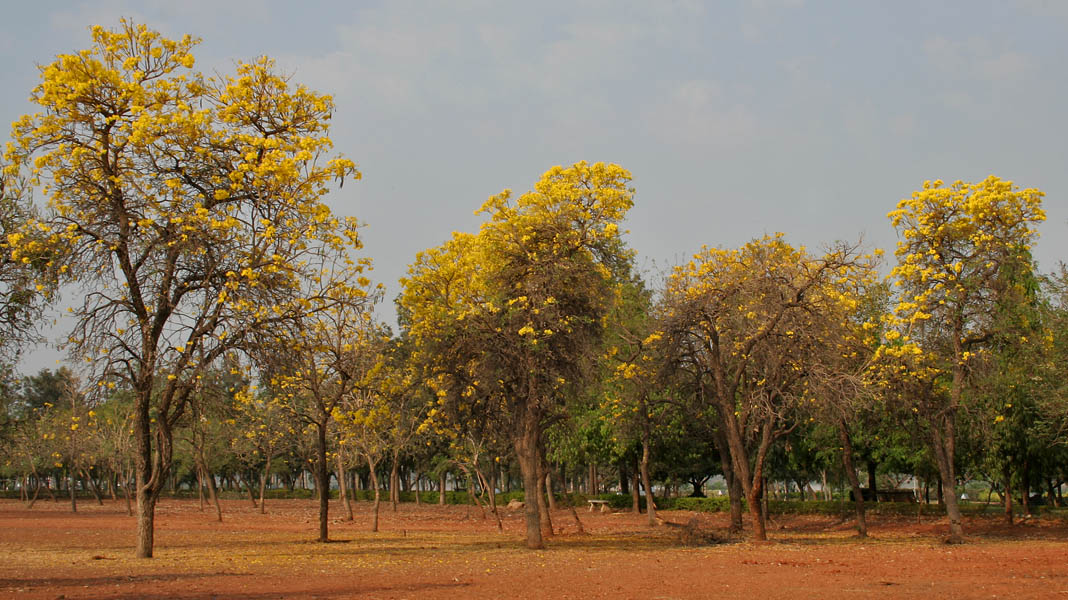
Sanjeevaiah Park

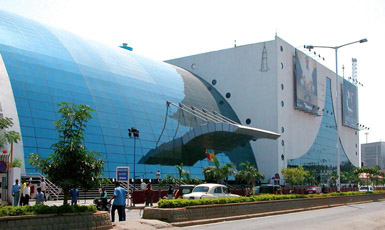
Prasads IMAX

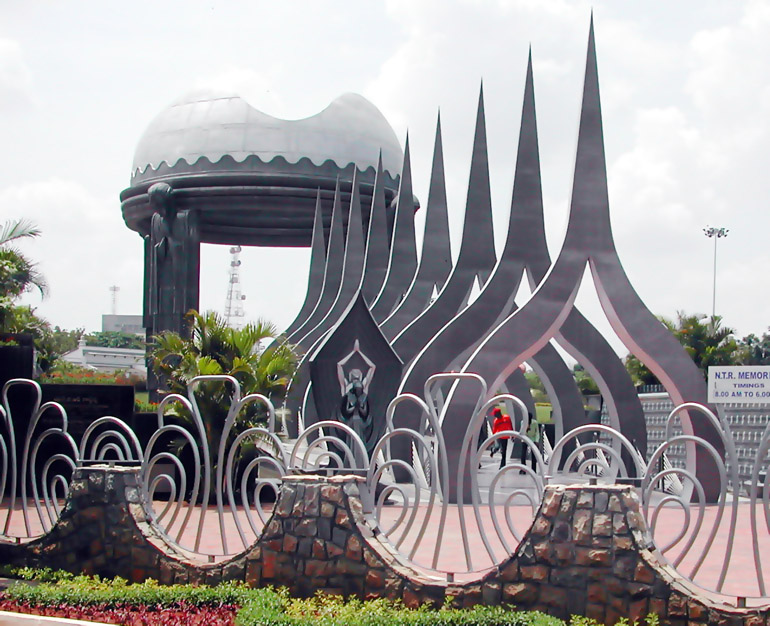
NTR memorial

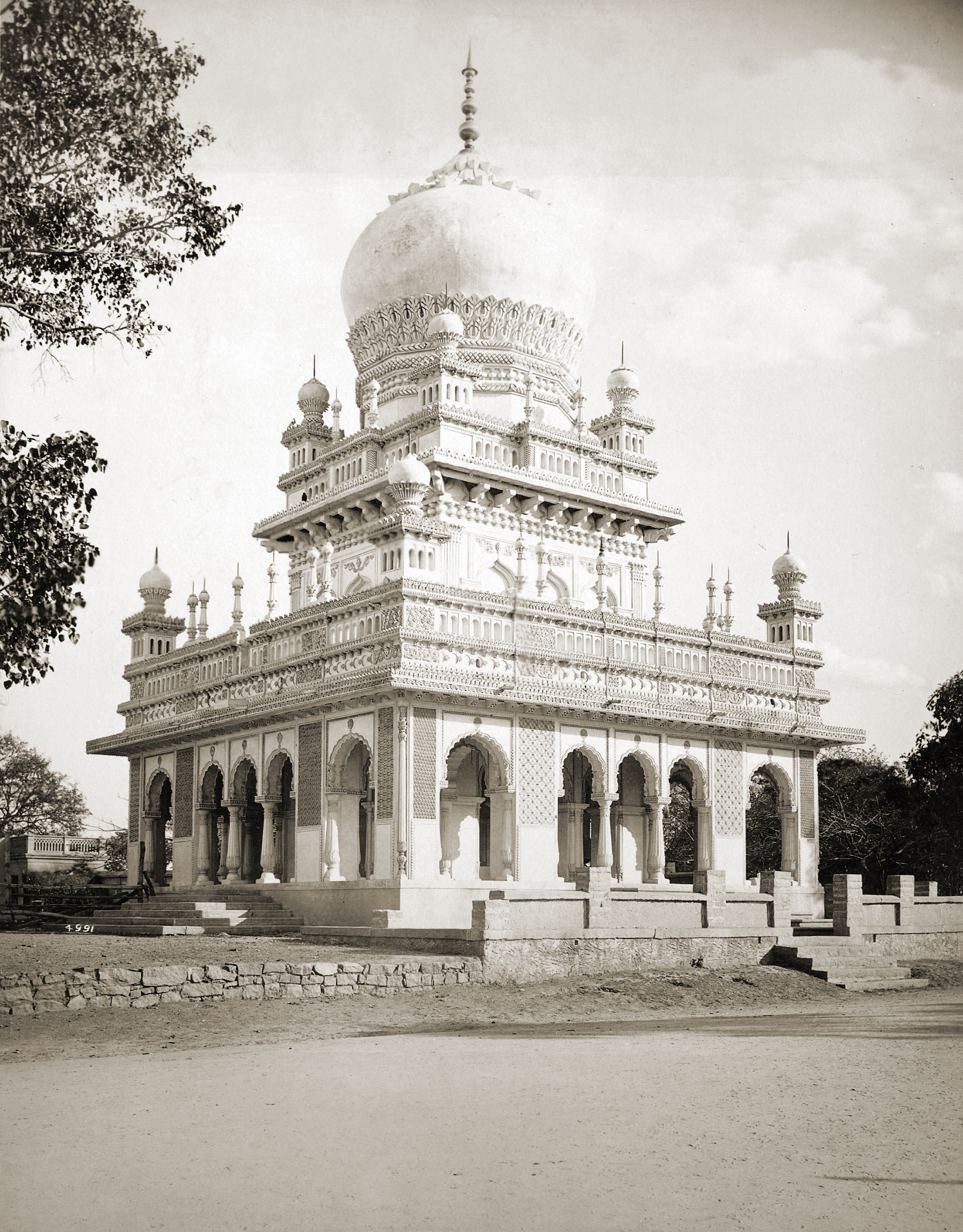
Saidaanimaa tomb

=== Lumbini Park ===
Lumbini Park is an urban park of 7.5 acres (3.0 ha) adjacent to Hussain Sagar. It was constructed at a cost of INR 2.35 crores on 5 acres (2.0 ha) of land as a part of the Buddha Poornima project. It has various attractions such as laser auditorium, boating facilities and musical fountains.

=== Birla Mandir ===
Birla Mandir was built in 1976 with white marble on a 280 feet (85 m) high hillock called the Naubath Pahad located to the south of Hussain Sagar. The construction took ten years and was consecrated in 1976 by Swami Ranganathananda of Ramakrishna Mission.

=== Sanjeevaiah Park ===
Sanjeevaiah Park is a public green space and park located to the north of the lake. Built on 92 acres (37 ha), the park is named after Damodaram Sanjivayya, former Chief Minister of Andhra Pradesh. The park is managed by the Hyderabad Metropolitan Development Authority and the park won the Best open landscape award during the 2010 Indian national trust for art and cultural heritage award presentations.

=== Prasads Multiplex ===
Prasad's IMAX is a multiplex of an area of 235,000 sq ft (21,800 m^{2}), housing an IMAX movie theater, a five screen multiplex, food court, multinational fast food outlets, a gaming zone and a shopping mall covering two levels of the complex. It is India's third IMAX theater. In November 2014, when Hollywood film Interstellar opened in theatres, Prasads was the only IMAX screen in India where the space drama was watched on 70mm film. The movie screen is said to be the largest IMAX screen (64 ft in height x 101.6 ft in width) in India and it is said to be fixed in Screen 6 of Prasad’s multi-plex. Screen 6 is now called PCX after renovation. Screen 6 was previously a 3D IMAX 70mm until 2014.

=== Snow World ===
Snow World is an amusement park located beside Indira Park and along the Hussain Sagar lake. The park can accommodate a total of 2,400 visitors in a day - visitors are exposed to snowfall for ten minutes for every hour.

=== NTR Gardens ===
NTR Gardens is a small urban park of 55 acres (0.22 km^{2}; 0.086 sq mi) adjacent to Hussain Sagar lake. Constructed in several phases since 1999, the park is presently being maintained by the Buddha Purnima Project Authority that functions under the directives of the Government of Telangana. The park is named after and houses the memorial of N T Rama Rao, a matinee idol and former Chief Minister of Andhra Pradesh who died on 18 January 1996.

=== Eat Street ===
Across the 10 km lakefront, spaces like Eat Street and Jalavihar Water Park are located. Eat Street serves meals, fast food and other options.

=== Tomb of Saidani Maa Sahebaa ===
Sayedani Maa Tomb is an Archaeological Survey of India declared heritage site located at the north end of Hussain Sagar. Saidani Maa Saheba was a saint of the Nizam era. An example of Islamic architecture, the tomb has been carved intricately with marble latticework.

=== Dr. B. R. Ambedkar Statue ===
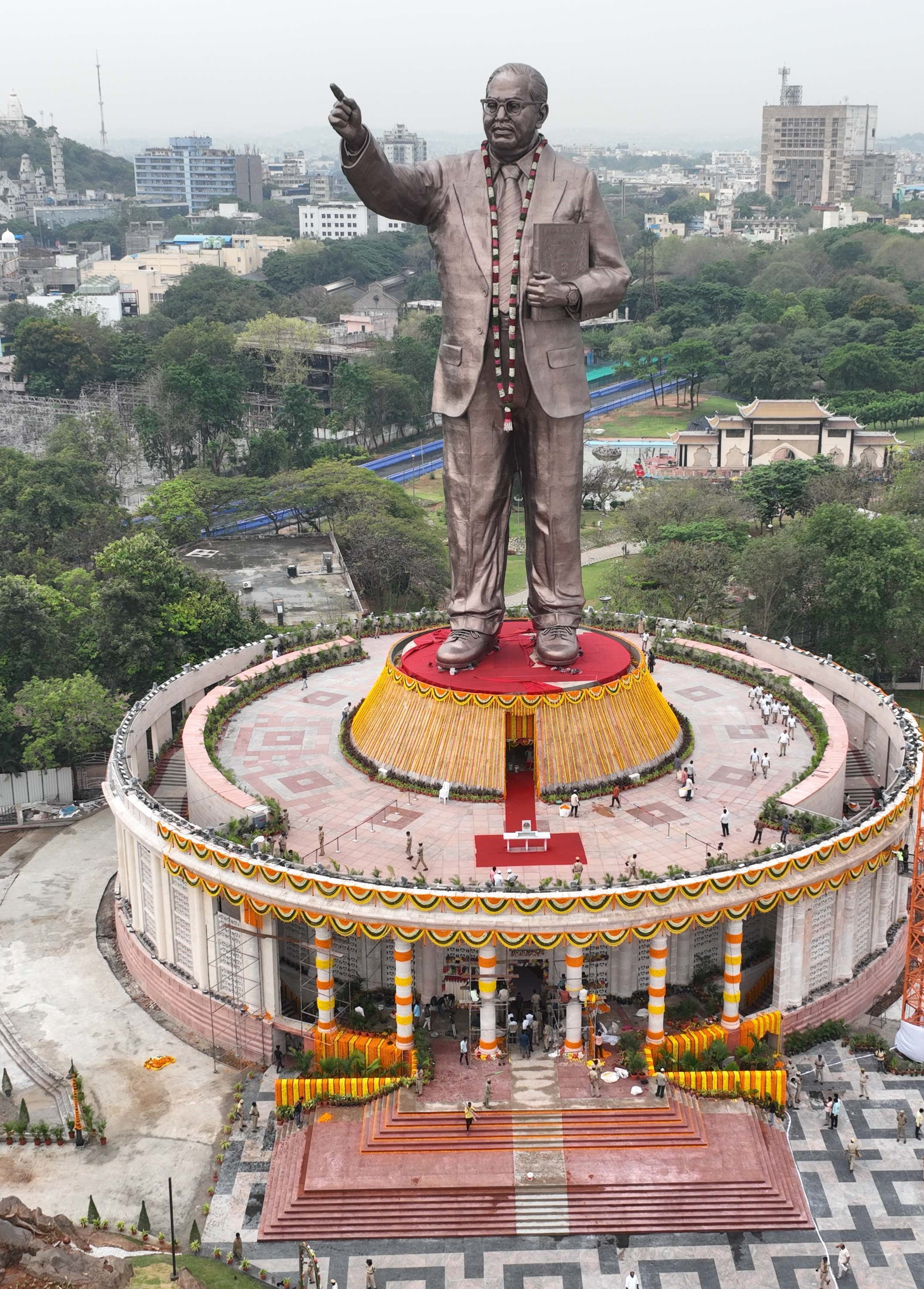
India's 2nd tallest statue of BR Ambedkar in Hyderabad

in 2023, The giant 125-foot-tall statue of Dr. Babasaheb Ambedkar has been installed on 11.8 acres, adjoining the banks of historic Hussain Sagar lake and the new Telangana state secretariat. The statue of Dr B R Ambedkar stands tall in his signature pose atop the country’s parliament house, which takes the overall height to 175 feet. It is the fourth tallest statue in India. The circular edifice resembling the parliament of India, also house a museum, library and an audio-visual hall across a 20,000 sq ft area to commemorate the life and times of Ambedkar. On 14 April 2023, Telangana Chief Minister K. Chandrashekar Rao unveiled a 125-feet tall bronze statue of Dr B. R. Ambedkar at the Hussain Sagar lake on his 132nd birth anniversary.

=== Telangana Amara Jyothi ===
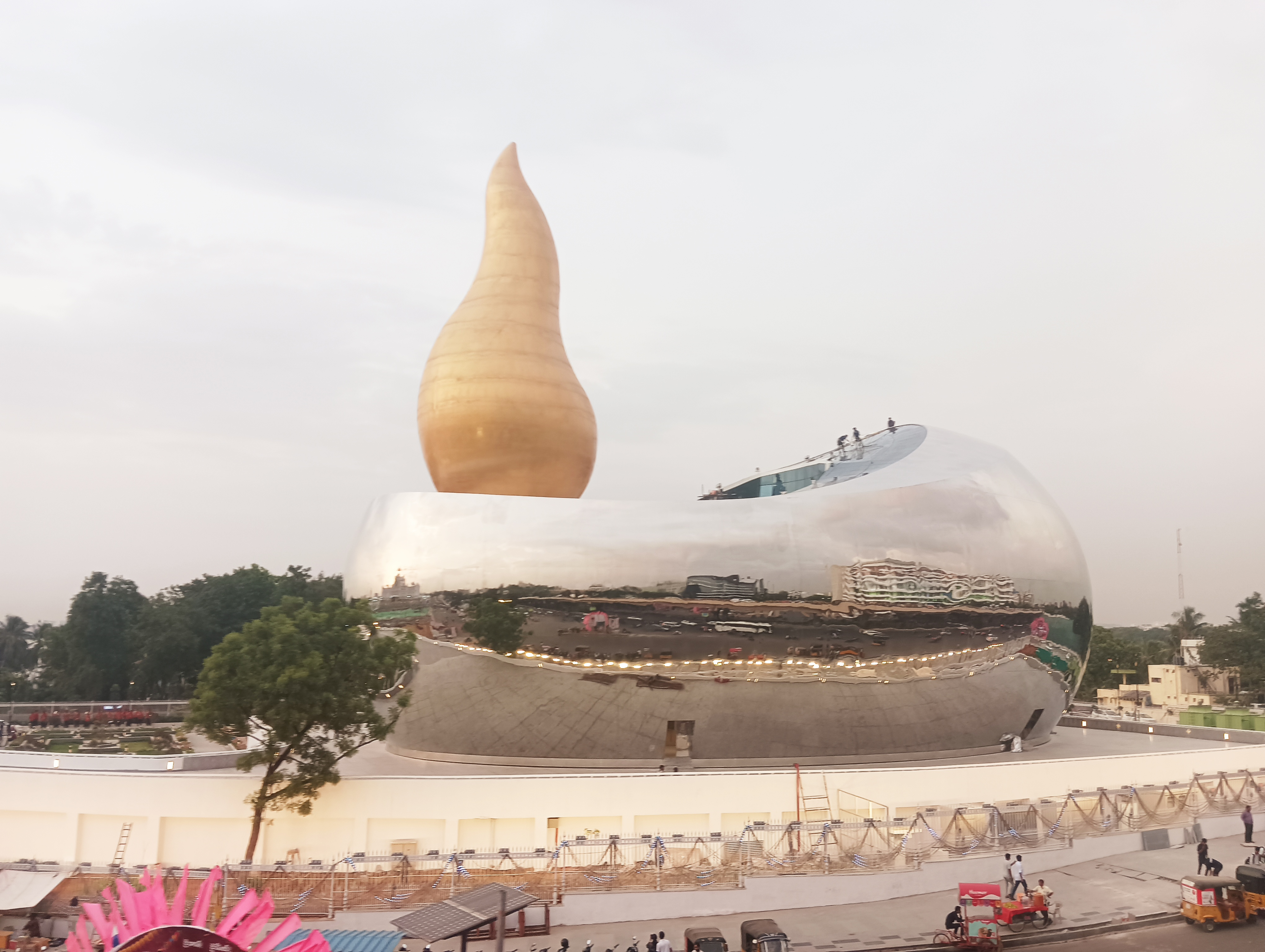
Telangana Amara Jyothi

Telangana Amara Jyothi, also known as Telangana Martyrs Memorial, is a major tourist attraction, located on the banks of Hussain Sagar. It is the largest seamless stainless-steel memorial built in the world and is five times bigger than Cloud Gate (located in Chicago). It was inaugurated by Chief Minister of Telanagana, K. Chandrashekar Rao on 22 June 2023.

=== Sailing ===
Hussain Sagar lake is a popular spot for sailing. Regattas have been held here since 1971 jointly by the EME Sailing Association and the Secunderabad Sailing Club. Hyderabad Sailing Week has been conducted here since 1984 when the first laser boats were introduced by the Laser Class Association of India. The event has grown from ten laser entries in 1984 to 110 laser entries in 2009. In August 2009 the lake was witness to the monsoon regatta in which sailors from all over India participated. Different classes of sailboats and yachts were raced including four J24, eighteen Hobie Cat and Forty-seven Optimist (dinghy).

The Yacht Club of Hyderabad located at Sanjeevaiah Park started in 2009 and instituted the Monsoon Regatta the same year. The club started with just three boats now boast of more than 45 on its premises including Lasers, Optimists, Omegas, Kayaks, and many safety and rescue vessels. The club trains youngsters to compete at the national level.

=== Statues of icons in Tank Bund, Hyderabad ===
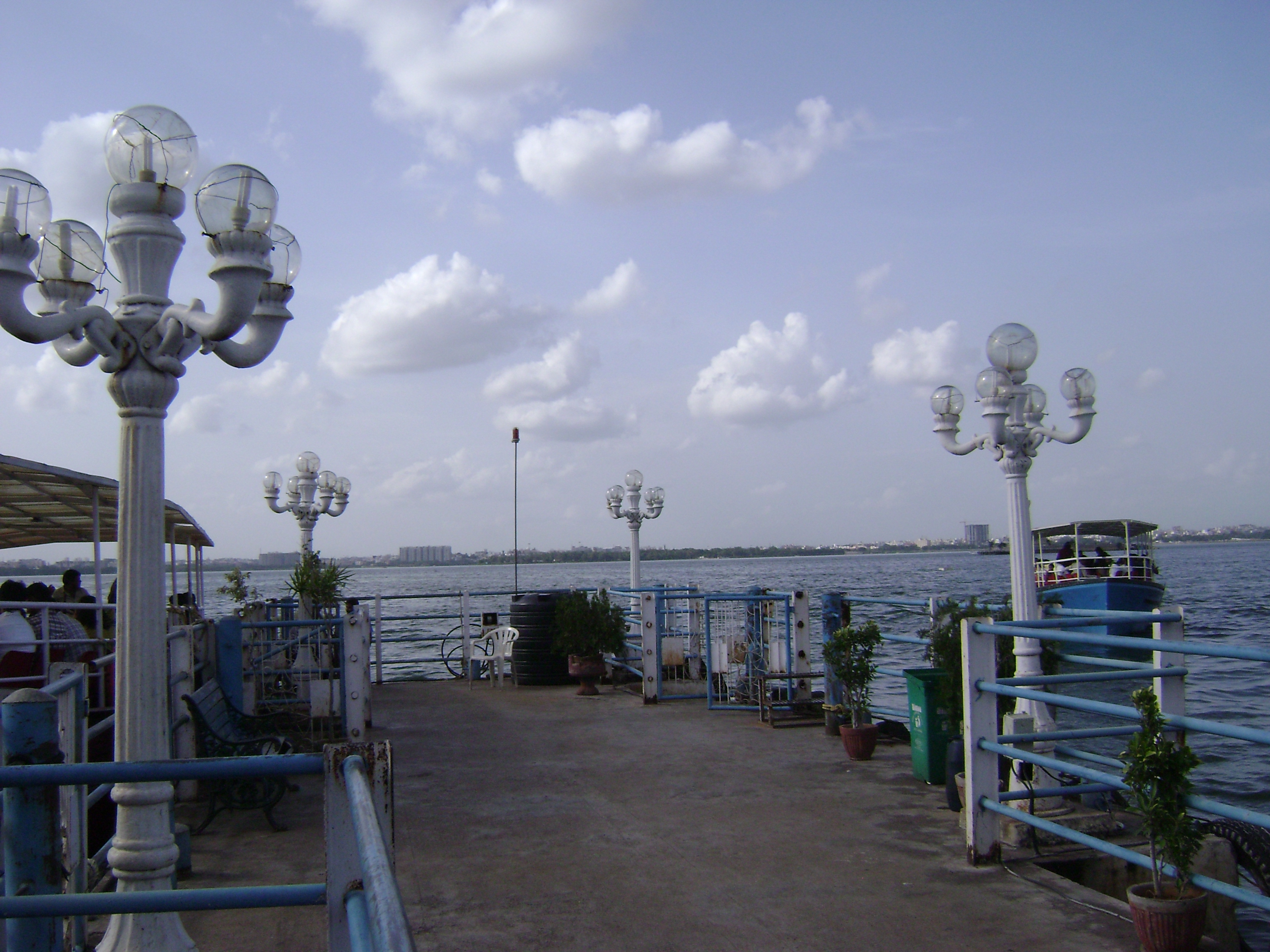
Boating Ghat near Hussain Sagar

34 well-sculptured bronze statues, mounted on high platforms, of people who played iconic role in the development of Hyderabad and Telugu culture along the Tank Bund road. The following 34 personalities are commemorated in the order of appearance from Secunderabad.

- Komaram Bheem
  Tribal leader from Telangana who openly fought against Nizam of Hyderabad with slogan Jal, jungal, zameen
- Rudrama Devi
  The 13th century Queen of the Kakatiya Dynasty which ruled over most parts of present-day Telangana and Andhra Pradesh
- Mahbub Ali Khan, Asaf Jah VI
  6th Nizam of the Asaf Jahi Dynasty
- Sarvepalli Radhakrishnan
  First Vice President of India and second President of India
- CR Reddy
  Educationist, political thinker, essayist, poet and literary critic
- Gurajada Apparao
  Telugu playwright, dramatist, poet, writer and humanist
- Ballari Raghava
  Telugu playwright, thespian and film actor
- Alluri Sita Rama Raju
  Indian Telugu revolutionary who fought against the British Raj
- Sir Arthur Cotton
  British irrigation engineer instrumental in building the Prakasam Barrage, the Dowleswaram Barrage and the Kurnool Cuddappah Canal (K. C. Canal)
- Tripuraneni Ramaswamy Chowdary
  Telugu lawyer, poet, playwright, reformer, rationalist and humanist
- Pingali Venkayya
  Indian freedom fighter and the designer of the flag on which the Indian national flag was based
- Kandukuri Veeresalingam
  Social reformer and Telugu writer
- Makhdoom Mohiuddin
  Urdu poet, Marxist political activist and a forerunner of Telangana Rebellion against the Nizam of Hyderabad
- Suravaram Pratapareddy
  Social historian from Telangana
- Gurram Jashuva
  Telugu poet and Dalit activist
- Mutnuri Krishna Rao
  Indian freedom fighter, editor, scholar and literary critic
- Sri Sri
  Telugu poet and lyricist
- Raghupathi Venkataratnam Naidu
  Indian social reformer
- Thyagaraja
  Renowned composer of Carnatic music
- Ramadasu
  17th-century Indian devotee of Lord Rama and a composer of Carnatic music
- Sri Krishnadevaraya
  The Emperor of the Vijayanagara Empire who reigned from 1509 to 1529
- Kshetrayya
  Telugu poet and composer of Carnatic music
- Potuluri Virabrahmendra Swami
  Hindu saint, who lived in Andhra Pradesh
- Bramha Naidu
  Minister in a Medieval Andhra kingdom of Palnadu
- Molla
  Telugu poet who authored the Telugu-language Ramayana
- Tana Shah
  Last ruler of the Qutb Shahi dynasty
- Siddhendra Yogi
  Inventor of Modern form of Classical dance Kuchipudi
- Yogi Vemana
  Telugu poet and philosopher
- Potana
  Telugu poet best known for his translation of the Bhagavata Purana from Sanskrit to Telugu
- Annamacharya
  15th-century Hindu saint and the earliest known Indian musician to compose songs called sankirtanas in praise of the Lord Venkateswara, a form of Vishnu
- Yerrapragada
  Medieval Telugu poet
- Tikkana
  Second poet of the "Trinity of Poets (Kavi Trayam)" who translated Mahabharata into Telugu
- Nannayya
  Telugu poet and the first in Trinity of poets (Kavitrayam), who authored Andhra Mahabharatam, a Telugu retelling of the Mahabharata.
- Gautamiputra Satakarni (Shalivahanudu)
  Ruler of the Satavahana Empire in present-day Deccan region of India

== Transport ==
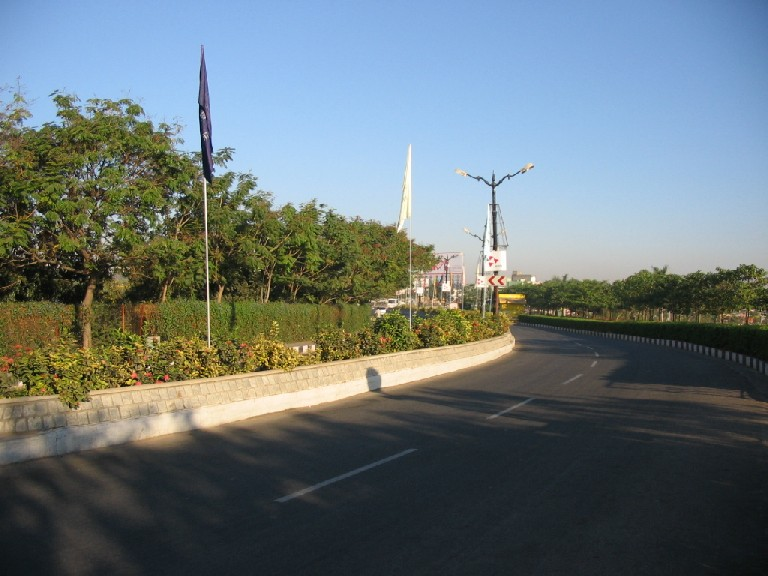
Necklace Road MMTS Station

Hussain Sagar is near to Khairatabad, Lakdi-Ka-Pul and Assembly metro stations. Hussain Sagar is also serviced by MMTS Train stations at Necklace Road, James Street and Sanjeevaiah Park. Necklace Road runs along the lake and connects important locations on its banks.

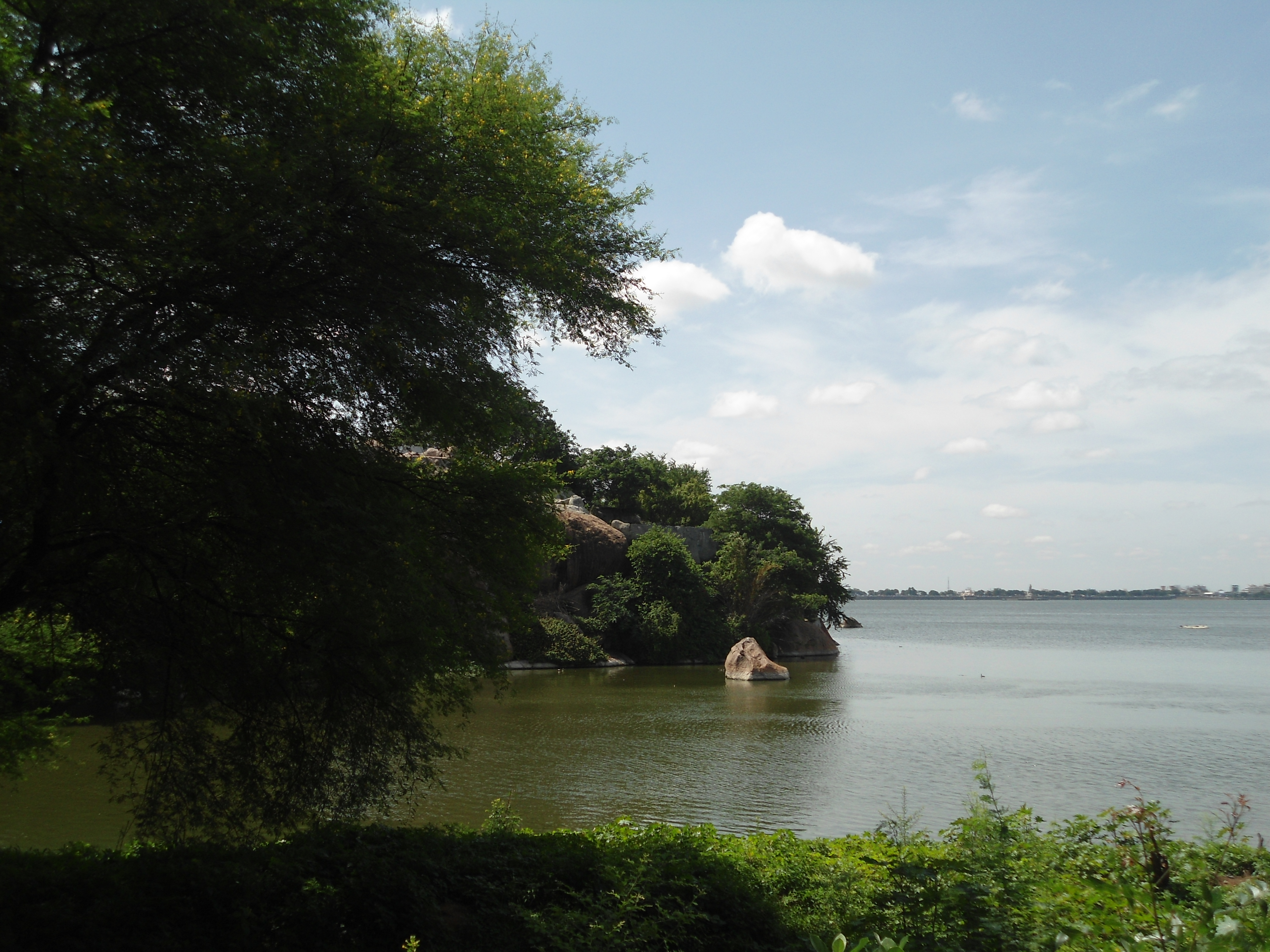
Hussain sagar Lake Wetland Eco Region

The Hussain Sagar Jn was a two platform railway station earlier but was dismantled in the mid-1980s. It is now a railway controlling cabin with three routes diverging towards Hyderabad, Secunderabad, and Begumpet.

== Suicides ==
The lake has become a suicide spot, with 146+ deaths and 510+ suicide attempts between 2013 and 2016. A lack of a proper rescue team, and a low fence barrier has resulted in the high number of deaths.

== Incidents ==
On 25 January 2025, a fire occurred during a firecracker show as part of the "Bharath Matha Maha Harathi" event. The fire originated on two boats, resulting in injuries to six people. Reports indicated that the required permissions for the fireworks had not been obtained.

== International recognition ==
Heart of the world by UNWTO
Hussain Sagar, a heritage site of India was declared as the 'Heart of the World' by UNWTO on 27 September 2012, on the occasion of World Tourism Day, for being the World's Largest Heart-Shaped Mark, the World's Heritage Heart-Shaped Mark, and the World's Wonderful Heart-Shaped Mark on the face of the earth among the heart-shaped marks formed by the heart-shaped lakes and islands that exist in the world. Logo for the 'Heart of the World' was inaugurated by H.E. Mr. Taleb Rifai, Secretary-General, United Nations World Tourism Organisation (UNWTO), Madrid-Spain, in the year 2013.

World's Largest Heart-Shaped Mark
Hussain Sagar lake is the largest heart-shaped mark among the marks formed by 78 heart-shaped lakes and 9 heart-shaped islands on the face of the earth.

UNESCO world Heritage site tentative list
Hussain lake is one of the Qutub Shahi monuments of Hyderabad-Telangana, out of which Golconda Fort, Qutub Shahi Tombs, and Charminar were already placed in the tentative list of World Heritage Sites of UNESCO.

World's Wonderful Heart-Shaped Mark
King Ibrahim Quli Qutb Shah had the heart-shaped built for his people's drinking & irrigation purpose out of his love towards his people. He named the lake after Hazrath Hussain Shawali (Sufi saint, medical practitioner and architect of the lake) as a sign of gratitude for Hussain's treatment that was given to the King during his sickness. Many historical monuments were placed on the bank.

== Ramsar Site Qualification Debate ==
The Wetlands Conservation and Management Rules of 2017, which are the principle legislation governing wetlands in India, rule out certain man-made wetlands from being notified as wetlands, even though man-made wetlands are included in the Ramsar list. Due to this, Hussainsagar Lake, a lake that has been around since 1563, has been a topic of debate. It is a hotspot of diversity, with 117 species of plants and 162 species of fauna, including mammals, birds, reptiles, amphibians, and insects. There is a disagreement between the MoEF&CC and the state government regarding whether Hussain Sagar is a wetland or not, causing the issue to remain unresolved. Denotification allows the environmental regulations to become a grey area, which makes the water body vulnerable to exploitation.

== Environmental conditions and conservation ==
Hussain Sagar Lake forms an important part of Hyderabad but now has become the main sewage collection zone of the twin cities of Hyderabad and Secunderabad. As a result of heavy anthropogenic pressures such as unplanned urbanization, the entire ecosystem of Hussain Sagar Lake has changed. The water quality has deteriorated considerably during the last three decades. The lake has become shallow due to siltation and accumulation of plant debris. A 2008 study of the lake's water and sediment has found that it has exceeded its eutrophic condition, reaching hypereutrophic status. Many undesirable changes in the structure of biological communities have resulted, and some important species have either declined or completely disappeared. Realizing the importance of conservation of Hussain Sagar Lake, a project has been formulated. This project shall be implemented by APPCB, Hyderabad, India. In this respect, a project feasibility report has been prepared for approval and financing. In spite of the commission of a sewage treatment plant on the western side, a large amount of untreated sewage and industrial effluents continue to flow into the lake.

== See also ==
- Hyderabad city lakes
