= Niranjan (disambiguation) =

Niranjan is an epithet in Hinduism.

Niranjan may also refer to:

== People ==
- Niranjanananda (1862–1904), also known as Swami Niranjanananda, monk of Ramakrishna Mission and disciple of Ramakrishna Paramahamsa

=== Given name ===
- C. S. Niranjan Kumar (born 1973), Indian politician
- Niranjan Behera (born 1984), Indian cricketer
- Niranjan Bhagat (1926–2018), Indian Gujarati language poet, critic and translator
- Niranjan Bishi, Indian politician
- Niranjan Das, a list of people with the name
- Niranjan Davkhare (born 1979), Indian politician
- Niranjan Godbole (born 1976), Indian cricketer
- Niranjan Goswami, Indian mime artist, actor and stage director
- Niranjan Hiranandani (born 1950), Indian businessman, co-founder and managing director of Hiranandani Group
- Niranjan Iyengar, Indian screenwriter and lyricist
- Niranjan Joseph Aditya Deva (born 1948), Sri Lankan born British politician
- Niranjan Kaushik, Indian film director, show-runner, content creator, screenwriter and advertising professional
- Niranjan Kumar Mehta, Indian politician
- Niranjan Lall (1901–?), Indian politician
- Niranjan Madhav (1703–1790), 18th-century Indian diplomat and poet
- Niranjan Mukundan (born 1994), Indian para-swimmer
- Niranjan Nath Wanchoo (1910–1982), Indian civil servant, and governor of Kerala and Madhya Pradesh
- Niranjan Pal (1889–1959), Indian playwright, screenwriter and film director
- Niranjan Parajuli, Nepali chemist, biochemist and biotechnologist
- Niranjan Patel (born 1943), Indian politician
- Niranjan Patnaik (born 1948), Indian politician
- Niranjan Pranshankar Pandya (born 1945), Indian social worker
- Niranjan Prasad (1941–2013), Indian flutist
- Niranjan Prasad Kesharwani (1930–1994), Indian politician
- Niranjan Pujari (born 1961), Indian politician
- Niranjan Reddy, a list of people with the name
- Niranjan Roy, Indian politician
- Niranjan Sengupta (1904–1969), Indian revolutionary, freedom fighter and politician
- Niranjan Shah (born 1944), Indian cricketer, businessman and cricket administrator
- Niranjan Shetty (born 1987), Indian actor
- Niranjan Singh (1906–1968), Indian politician
- Niranjan Singh Talib (1901–1976), Indian journalist, independence activist, revolutionary and politician
- Niranjan Singh Tasneem (1929–2019), Indian novelist
- Niranjan Sual Singh (born 1961), Indian Roman Catholic priest and bishop
- Niranjan Sudhindra (born 1996), Indian actor
- S. Niranjan Reddy (born 1970), Indian lawyer and politician
- Sadhvi Niranjan Jyoti (born 1967), Indian Hindu monk and politician
- Singireddy Niranjan Reddy (born 1958), Indian politician

=== Surname ===
- Pagadala Niranjan (born 1984), Indian cricketer
- Ravikumar Niranjan, Indian Protestant Christian priest and bishop
- Sangeeta Niranjan, Indo-Fijian businesswoman

== Other ==
- Alakh Niranjan, a term used by Nath Yogis as a synonym for Creator, and to describe the characteristics of God and the Self, known as the Atman
- Ek Niranjan, 2009 Indian Telugu-language action comedy film
- Niranjan Shah Stadium, an international cricket stadium in Rajkot, Gujarat, India
