= Yuva Galam Padayatra =

Political event

- Date: 27 January – 18 December 2023
- Duration: 226 days
- Location: Andhra Pradesh
- Type: Padayatra
- Theme: Political Movement and Campaign
- Motive: To fight against poverty, unemployment, corruption and the anarchy of the ruling party by mobilizing the youth of AP
- Organised by: Nara Lokesh, Telugu Desam Party
- Participants: Civilians, Politicians, Political Activists, Civil Society Organizations and Celebrities

Yuva Galam (Lit: ‘Voice of the Youth’) was a padayatra, or political foot march, across Andhra Pradesh led by Nara Lokesh, then national general secretary of the Telugu Desam Party (TDP) from 27 January to 18 December 2023. The party said the march was meant toi draw young people into politics.

Lokesh set out from Kuppam on 27 January 2023, planning to walk 4,000 km to Srikakulam through 100 assembly constituencies. The march was intended to build support for the TDP ahead of the 2024 Assembly and Lok Sabha elections, and reporters described it as an attempt to re-establish the party as the alternative to the ruling YSR Congress Party. The march was suspended after N. Chandrababu Naidu's arrest on 9 September 2023 in an alleged scam and resumed on 27 November from Podalada in Konaseema district. It ended in the Gajuwaka constituency near Visakhapatnam, on 18 December 2023, after 226 days and about 3,132 km. In the 2024 Assembly election, Lokesh won Mangalagiri constituency with over 90,000 votes.

== Background ==
Lokesh is the son of TDP president N. Chandrababu Naidu and holds an MBA from Stanford University. He entered the Legislative Council in 2017 and was minister for Panchayati Raj and Information Technology in his father's government until 2019. In the 2019 state legislative assembly election, his first direct election, he contested Mangalagiri, a seat held by the YSRCP, saying there was "no point in searching for a safe seat." He lost to the incumbent Alla Ramakrishna Reddy by fewer than 5,500 votes. Commentators described the padayatra as a test of Lokesh's leadership and of his standing as Naidu's likely successor. TDP supporters call Lokesh 'Chinna Babu' (Junior Babu).

== Public Events ==
While the padayatra is going on, Lokesh is actively indulging in hearing out people's problems by holding face-to-face meetings with various communities in each constituency. The youth leader is meeting with farmers, youth, women, Muslims, BCs, SCs, STs, traders, IT professionals and other communities to understand their problems.

Event name	Description
Hello Lokesh	On 24 February, on the grounds near Ankura Hospital in Tirupati, Nara Lokesh addressed students as part of ‘Hello Lokesh’. Despite being confronted with controversial questions such as Jr NTR's potential political entrance, .
Raithanna tho Lokesh	The second grand interactive event was held on 8 April with farmers. Lokesh highlighted how the lives of farmers were jeopardized by a rise in suicides and the increasing debt burden in the current government. However, farmers who participated in the event felt that only some farmers were given the opportunity to ask questions.
Palle Pragathi Kosam Mee Lokesh	On the occasion of the Panchayat Raj Day, 'Palle Pragathi Kosam Mee Lokesh' programme was held in Adoni on 24 April 2023. In this program, Lokesh, the former Minister for Rural Development and Panchayati Raj, highlighted the diversion of funds from panchayat accounts in a meeting with Sarpanchs. However, the event did not get the traction as expected.
Lokesh tho Guftugu	On 7 May 2023, in Kurnool, Lokesh took part in a Muslim-exclusive event ‘Lokesh Tho Guftugu’, where the religious minorities explained their struggles. However, the event went a little controversial for allegedly accusing MLA Hafeez Khan of encroaching Waqf lands.
Mission Rayalseema	During the Mission Rayalaseema Event, hosted in Kadapa on 7 June, Lokesh promised research centres for horticultural crops, eco-tourism, tiger tourism, sports university, automobile and electronic hubs if the TDP is voted to power. The event also culminated his walkathon in Rayalaseema and Lokesh entered Nellore.
Mahashakti tho Lokesh	The ‘Mahashakti Tho Lokesh’ programme was organised in Nellore on 3 July. During the event, Lokesh asserted that TDP's policy is to implement welfare schemes not by raising loans but by creating wealth. Moreover, he vowed to strictly enforce Nirbhaya Act and make sure that no man ever tries to dishonour any woman.
JAI HO BC	On 27 July, at Ravipriya function hall in Ongole, Nara Lokesh addressed BC community people as part of "Jai Ho BC" event. The Telugu Desam Party (TDP) in Andhra Pradesh, if elected to power, intends to push the central government for a caste-wise census of Other Backward Classes (OBCs). This proposal comes from TDP leader Lokesh. He believes that such a census would aid in better allocation of resources and benefits to different OBC communities.
YSRCP Badithulatho Mukha Mukhi	Nara Lokesh, during TDP's "Yuvagalam Padayatra," on 10 August Nara Lokesh met YSRCP victims in Palnadu district's Pedakurapadu constituency. He expressed solidarity, criticized the ruling party's conduct, and vowed to take action against wrongdoers if TDP comes to power.
Amaravati Avedanam	During the Amaravati avedanam, hosted at Tadikonda On 13 August 2023, Nara Lokesh Reiterating that Andhra Pradesh needs a single capital city and multiple capitals would serve no purpose except fetching political mileage for the YSR Congress Party. He promised to justify the sacrifices of Amaravathi farmers and stand by their side. He ensured to make them proud for building a capital for Andhra Pradesh that whole nation will look forward.
Hello Lokesh	The "Hello Lokesh" programme was organized in Mangalagiri on 16 August 2023. During this event Lokesh pledges job opportunities for youth, investments in Vizag, and the completion of Amaravati as the capital in Andhra Pradesh.
ST Event	The "Dalit Galam" programme was organized in "Pithapuram" on 3 December 2023. During the event, Lokesh highlights caste-based violence and inhumane treatment of Dalits under YSRCP rule in Andhra Pradesh. He assures people of standing in solidarity with the victims and vows to fight for justice until it is achieved.

== Milestones ==
Nara Lokesh has been making promises at various milestones of the Yuva Galam padayatra. The Youth leader claims that there was lot of research and discussion behind these promises and swore to implement them as soon as TDP comes to power. Here are the promises that have been announced by him:

Milestone	Promises made
100 km (Puthalapattu)	To mark the 100 kilometres of his walkathon, Nara Lokesh announced to set up a dialysis center in a government hospital at Bangarupalyam. As a part of his promise, he pledged to cover the entire expenditure to ensure accessibility to kidney patients who often have to travel long distances for treatment in the area.
200 km (GD Nellore)	Marking the occasion of 200 kilometres of his walkathon, he assured to set up a degree college in Gangadhara Nellore within 100 days of coming back to power.
300 km (Srikalahasti)	To commensurate the 300 kilometres of the walkathon, Nara Lokesh promised to provide safe drinking water to the cluster of villages around Thondamanadu within 100 days of coming to power.
400 km (Chandragiri)	After successfully completing 400 kilometres in his father's birthplace, he made a promise of constructing 10 bedded hospital at Narendrakunta of Pakala Mandal by establishing a plaque.
500 km (Madanapalle)	The TDP leader completed 500 kilometres of his padayatra in Chinnathippa Samudram village and to celebrate his occasion, Nara Lokesh promised to establish a processing unit and cold storage facilities for the tomato farmers after the TDP comes to power in Andhra Pradesh.
600 km (Kadiri)	During the 48th day of padayatra, TDP National General Secretary Nara Lokesh reached a significant milestone of 600 kilometres in Mylavaram. On this occasion, he pledged to create a temple tourism circuit that would contribute to the generation of 6,000 job opportunities for the youth residing in the region.
700 km (Penukonda)	Nara Lokesh completed 700 kilometers in 55 days at Penukonda constituency by unveiling the milestone at Gatturu to permanently solve the drinking water and irrigation water needs of Gorantla and Madakasira mandals. He also promised to establish a lift irrigation project from the Handri Neeva canal.
800 km (Singanamala)	On the 62nd day of the Padayatra, Nara Lokesh completed his 800 kilometres and to commensurate that, a milestone promise was made by him to establish a Sweet Lime Processing unit at Martadu, Garladinne Mandal of Singanamala Assembly Constituency.
900 km (Dhone)	In Dhone Assembly Constituency, Yuva Galam padayatra has reached the 900 kilometer milestone. To mark this occasion, a stone plaque was placed, symbolizing the commitment to undertake the Gundala project with the aim of ensuring access to water for the residents of Allur, Dhone, and Banaganapalle constituencies.
1000 km (Adoni)	On the 77th day of the Padayatra, Nara Lokesh crossed the 1000-kilometre milestone in the Kurnool district. To commemorate this momentous occasion, he made a commitment to adopt Ward No. 21 of Adoni Town, acknowledging its lack of basic amenities.
1100 km (Yemmiganur)	In honor of achieving the milestone of reaching 1100 kilometers in the Yemmiganur Constituency of Nandyal District, TDP National General Secretary Nara Lokesh unveiled the stone plaque to establish a textile park there.
1200 km (Nandikotkur)	In the Nandikotkur Assembly Constituency, the padayatra has marked its 1200-kilometer milestone. To commemorate this event, Nara Lokesh unveiled a stone plaque signifying his commitment to construct the Miduthuru lift Irrigation project which would potentially irrigate 22,000 acres of land and provide drinking water to 60,000 people.
1300 km (Nandyal)	During the 103rd day of the Yuva Galam Padayatra, Nara Lokesh achieved a milestone by covering 1300 kilometers in Nandyal. He unveiled a stone plaque as a commitment to establish Turmeric market and a Cold Storage at Kanala Panchayat at Nandyal Rural Mandal after TDP comes to power.
1400 km (Jammalamadugu)	On the padayatra's 1400 kilometer milestone at Jammalamadugu Constituency, Nara Lokesh committed to establish small-scale industry in Nimmaladinne to employ displaced people of Gandikota reservoir.
1500 km (Kadapa)	To commensurate the occasion of completing 1500 kilometers of padayatra, Nara Lokesh Inaugurated a stone plaque at Kadapa assembly constituency with a promise to establish a comprehensive drainage system in 49th division of Kadapa Town.
1600 km (Atmakuru)	Nara Lokesh unveiled milestone to set up Horticulture Cooperative Society for farmers at Chunchaluuru in Atmakuru Assembly constituency after completing 1600 kilometers of his Padayatra in Nellore District.
1700 km (Venkatagiri)	Yuva Galam Padayatra has unlocked 1700 kilometers milestone at Venkatagiri Assembly Constituency of Tirupati. On this occasion, a stone plaque was Inaugurated to establish a APCO Handloom Factory in Dakili Mandal to improve livelihood of the weavers locally.
1800 km (Gudur)	on 138th Day of Padayatra, Nara Lokesh completed the 1800 kilometers milestone at Aravapalem at Chittamuru Mandal in Gudur Constituency. On the occasion, he made a commitment to reintroduce past subsidies and incentives to support Aqua farmers by unveiling a stone plaque.
1900 km (Kovur)	On the milestone of Yuva Galam Padayatra finishing 1900 km, Nara Lokesh inaugurated a stone plaque at Salachintala Center promising to establish paddy drying platforms across the assembly Constituency.
2000 km (Kavali)	Unveiling a plaque to mark the milestone of 2000 km, Nara Lokesh promised to set up the Fisheries Development Board if the TDP was voted to power and that it would help fishermen including the shrimp farmers eke out a decent living.
2100 km (Kanigiri)	Nara Lokesh unveiled a plaque for a drinking water project at Azeezpuram in Kanigiri Assembly constituency as his Yuva Galam padayatra completed a distance of 2,100 km on 19 July.
2200 km (Trovagunta)	On the occasion of Yuvagalam padayatra completing 2200 km Milestone at Trovagunta (1st Ward), stone plaque was inaugurated promising an underground drainage system to solve the waterlogging issues of Ongole city, that gets immersed in every rain.
2300 km (Vinukonda)	Yuvagalam padayatra has unlocked 2300 kilometre's milestone at Vinukonda Assembly constituency of Palnadu. On this occasion, a stone plaque was inaugurated promising the Varikipudishela project as a permanent solution to the Bollapally Mandal's Drinking and Irrigation water problems.
2400 km (Pedakurapadu)	On the occasion of Yuva Galam Padayatra reaching the 2400 km Milestone a stone plaque was inaugurated at Dodleru promising to construct a lift irrigation scheme to address the drinking and irrigation water challenges of Pedakurapadu constituency.
2500 km (Mangalagiri)	On the occasion of reaching the 2500 km Milestone a stone plaque was inaugurated to represent Nara Lokesh promise to construct 20 thousand houses for the poor living in Mangalagiri Assembly Constituency.
2600 km (Nuzvid)	Yuvagalam Padayatra has unlocked the 2600 km at Simhadripuram Village, Musunuru Mandal, in the Nuzvid Assembly Constituency. A stone plaque was inaugurated promising to complete the Chintalapudi Lift Irrigation Project within 2 years of the Telugu Desam Party coming to power and make irrigation water available to the plateau regions of combined Krishna and West Godavari Districts.
2700 km (Sithampet)	Started with the aim of raising public consciousness, Yuvagalam Padayatra completed 200 days and 2700 km at Sithampet in Polavaram Assembly Constituency. On this occasion, a stone plaque was inaugurated promising to look into all the false and fallacious cases filed by the YSRCP government targeting people of various communities and discard them within a year after TDP comes to power.
2800 km (Vempa Village)	Yuvagalam Padayatra has unlocked the 2700 km at Vempa village in the Bhimavaram Assembly Constituency. A stone plaque was inaugurated promising to provide electricity at Rs 1.50 per unit to benefit the aqua farmers in this region regardless of the zone.
2900 km (Patha Injaram)	Yuvagalam Padayatra has unlocked the 2900 km at Patha Injaram, Polavaram Mandal in Mummidivaram Assembly Constituency. A stone plaque was inaugurated promising an insurance scheme would be implemented for toddy tappers and coconut tree climbers.
3000 km (Gouri Library)	Yuvagalam Padayatra has unlocked the 3000 km at Gouri Library in GVMC Ward No.81 [ Anakapalli assembly constituency ]. A stone plaque was inaugurated promising to complete the railway bridge between Chodavaram and Anakapalli.
3132 km (Aganampudi)	Yuva Galam has been the people's war against Tyranny. Yuva Galam has been the voice of the oppressed. With common people as its voice and common people as its strength, the padayatra marched tirelessly for 226 days and 3132 km. Nara Lokesh witnessed with his own eyes how an incompetent man obsessed with power attacked institutions and destroyed democracy. He restored the faith of the endless youth who lost hope in the future. He made successful with everyone's collaboration, ended the Yuvagalam Padayatra at Aganampudi in the Gajuwaka constituency.

== Public Reception ==
The youth movement continued uninterrupted except on unavoidable occasions like Tarakaratna's death, the MLC election code, Ugadi and Mahanadu. The Yuva Galam attracted a lot of attention from both the mainstream and social media right from the start. In many places, people joined Nara Lokesh in large numbers on his Padayatra.

Political strategists say much has changed in Lokesh, from the maturity in his speeches such as emphasizing 'Babu is the CM' to playing it safe by using 'Jagan Mohan, Donga Mohan' strategically in his speeches in order to not hurt the Reddy community. However, despite the natural style of articulation, at Gudur, Lokesh faced a mental block while delivering a speech on the government farmer policies.

Critics have alleged that Nara Lokesh replicated Jagan's Padayatra in a manner that closely mimicked the Praja Sankalpa Yatra, including shot-for-shot recreations and identical camera angles from where the photographs were captured. Critics also pointed out that, Nara Lokesh is imitating the immoral language used by Kodali Nani and Perni Nani. However, Nara Lokesh's language attracted mixed opinions, neither good nor bad.

The party claims to have received 2000+ written petitions from the people through the Yuva Galam Padayatra, but people are not being kept in the loop. A farmer from Hindupuram commented that they want to know what they are doing to his requests as there was no response.

Despite facing significant challenges, the TDP Supremo's son acknowledges the Padayatra's crucial role in the TDP's triumph in the MLC elections held in the three constituencies reserved for graduates, indicating a favorable response from the public.

== Controversies ==
Since its commencement, Nara Lokesh's padayatra has been embroiled in controversies within the Telugu state. The unfortunate demise of actor Tarakaratna, who is Nara Lokesh's cousin, further added to the controversy surrounding the padayatra.

=== Enactment of GO No.1 ===
A week before the launch of Yuva Galam padayatra, The state government issued GO No. 1 imposing restrictions on public meetings creating hurdles to the yatra. During the course of Padayatra, the power supply was cut and DJ vans were seized at several places including Bangarupalem, Chittoor district, supposedly to cause troubles in the Padayatra. On other instances, the police reportedly grabbed the mike from Basha, a TDP activist, and pushed Lokesh down the bench he was standing on to address the local activists.

=== Deployment of Drones ===
During the initial days of the padayatra, there were allegations that the Government deployed drones in the context of security. These drones were allegedly used to take visuals in case of violations which could be used to testify in the court. But then, TDP cadres alleged that the visuals taken by these drones are being sent to YSR Congress's social media cell and Sakshi.

==== Lokesh's allegations on YSRCP leaders ====
On the sidelines of his ongoing Yuva Galam padayatra at Alur in Kurnool district, Nara Lokesh alleged that Gummanur Jayaram- the Benz minister had grabbed 180 acres of prime land belonging to Ittina company. Though the lands grabbed by the ex-minister were commercial in nature, they were shown as agricultural lands and later registered in the names of the family members of Gummanur Jayaram. To substantiate his allegations, the TDP leader released several documents.

=== Lokesh's allegation on Waqf Board land grabbing ===
Situation took an unexpected turn when Nara Lokesh found himself facing a complaint filed by members of the Muslim Hakkula Parirakshana Samithi. The complaint alleged that Lokesh had made accusations against Kurnool MLA Hafeez Khan, claiming that Khan had unlawfully acquired Waqf Board lands. In their complaint, the office bearers of the Muslim Hakkula Parirakshana Samithi, said Lokesh should desist from levelling allegations against the MLA Hafeez Khan without evidence.

==== Mishaps during Padayatra ====
During the padayatra, an auto driver who accompanied Nara Lokesh became the target of trolling when his shoes, resembling Adidas footwear, were used to discredit the participants of the padayatra. In response, the auto driver clarified that the shoes were counterfeit products. Despite his explanation, the trolls swiftly attempted to undermine his credibility.

Similarly, during the Padayatra in Proddatur, Andhra Pradesh's YSR Kadapa district, some miscreants targeted the padayatra by throwing eggs at Nara Lokesh and his team.

=== Padayatra Break ===
Nara Lokesh gave a break to the Yuva Galam Padayatra for two days on 13 and 14 July to testify for a defamation case before the district magistrate against the AP Forest Corporation Chairman Gurrampati Devender Reddy for allegedly accusing Lokesh of being responsible for the suicide of Kanthamaneni Umamaheswari by grabbing her 5 acres of land in Jubilee Hills and MLC Sunitha for allegedly calling out Heritage foods as 'Sara industry' (Cheap local liquor Industry).
