= Chintalapalli =

Chintalapalli may refer to:

- Chintalapalli, East Godavari, a village in Andhra Pradesh, India
- Chintalapalli, Kurnool, a village in Andhra Pradesh, India
