= Murugudu Hanumantha Rao =

MLA
- Incumbent
- Assumed office 1999–2009
- Preceded by: Nimmagadda Rama Mohan Rao
- Succeeded by: Kandru Kamala
- Constituency: Mangalagiri Constituency

Personal details
- Born: 1 March 1947 (age 79) Mangalagiri, Guntur district, Andhra Pradesh
- Party: YSR Congress Party
- Other political affiliations: Indian National Congress
- Spouse: Samrajyam
- Children: Aruna Kumari, Madhusudhana Rao, Satyam
- Parent(s): Manikyam, China Veeraraghavulu

Murugudu Hanumantha Rao is an Indian politician from Andhra Pradesh. He was elected as a member of the Andhra Pradesh Legislative Council (MLC) in the 2021 elections.

== Early life ==
Murugudu Hanumantha Rao was born on 15 March 1947 to Manikyam and China Veeraraghavulu in Mangalagiri, Guntur district, Andhra Pradesh.

== Political career ==
Rao entered politics in 1987 through the Congress Party. He contested in the Mangalagiri municipal elections and served as the municipal chairman of Mangalagiri from 1987 to 1992. In the 1999 Assembly elections, he contested as the Congress candidate from the Mangalagiri constituency and was elected as an MLA for the first time, defeating his nearest opponent, TDP candidate Nimmagadda Rammohan Rao, by a margin of 12,024 votes. Rao was elected for a second term as MLA in the 2004 Assembly elections, serving as the chairman of the Legislative Committee and as a minister in the Y. S. Rajasekhara Reddy cabinet.

In 2009, Rao was denied a ticket from the Mangalagiri constituency. Following the state bifurcation, he joined the Telugu Desam Party (TDP) in 2013 and served as the chairman of APCO from 2013 to 2015. He resigned from the TDP on 23 September 2021. Rao subsequently joined the YSR Congress Party and was elected unanimously as a member of the Legislative Council (MLC) under the Guntur district Local Authorities quota in 2021, taking the oath of office on 8 December 2021.
