= GFQ =

GFQ may refer to:

- Giant Foamboard Quadcopter, University of Manchester drone made from Foamcore
- GFQ, magazine launched by Minhaz Merchant
- GFQ, division code for Guangfeng, Shangrao, China
