= Nandamuri =

Nandamuri is a Telugu surname commonly found among people of the Kamma caste. People with the name include:

- Nandamuri Taraka Rama Rao (1923–1996), or NTR, an Indian film actor and politician
- Nandamuri Balakrishna (born 1960), an Indian film actor and politician
- Nandamuri Harikrishna (1956–2018), an Indian film actor and politician
- Nandamuri Kalyan Ram (born 1978), an Indian film actor
- Nandamuri Taraka Rama Rao Jr. (born 1983), or Jr. NTR, an Indian film actor
- Nandamuri Taraka Ratna (born 1983), an Indian film actor
