= Amy Markham =

American model (born 1990)

Amy Johanna Markham
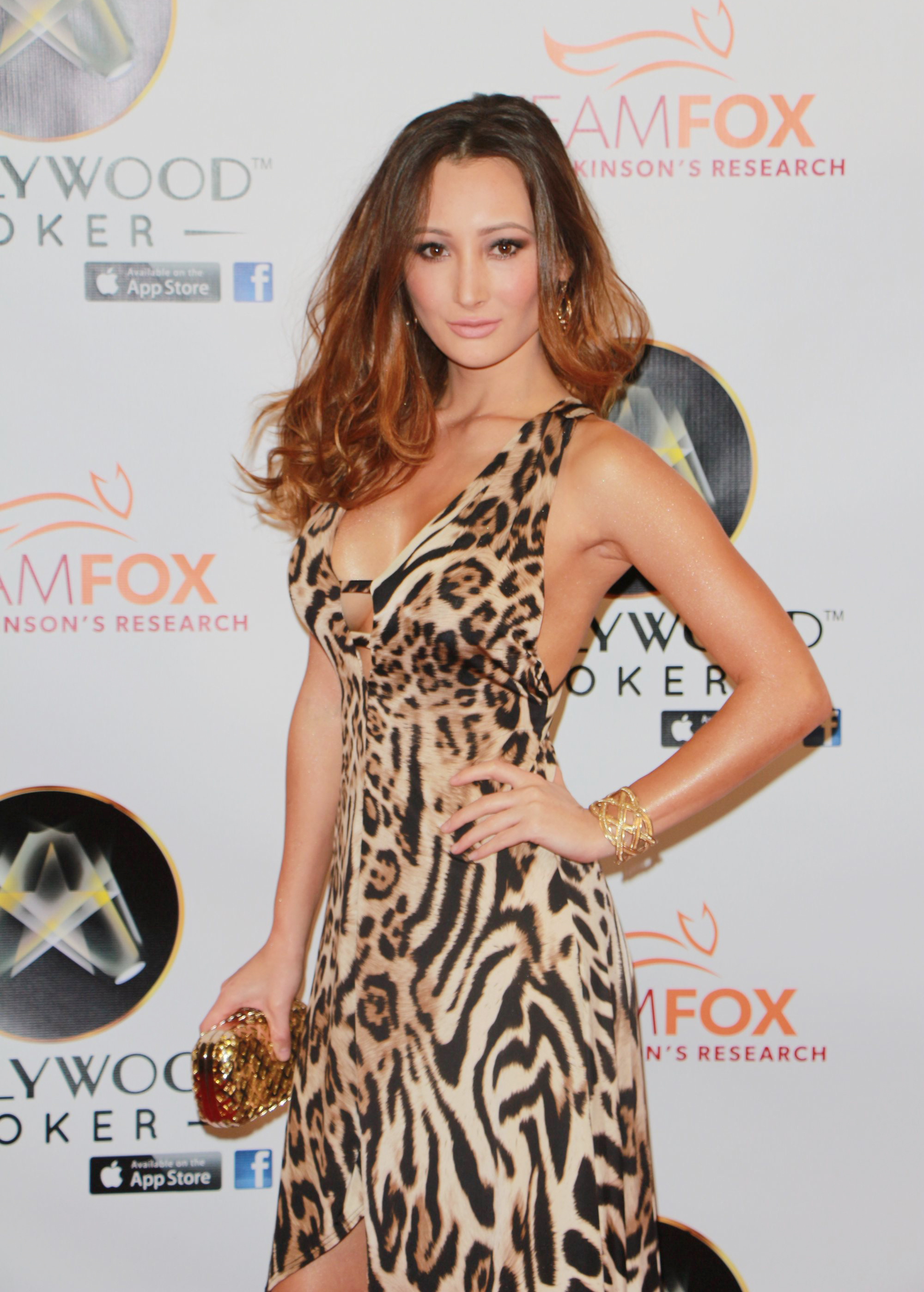
- Amy Markham at the Michael J Fox Hollywood Celebrity Poker Invitational
- Born: 1990 (age 35–36); Seoul, South Korea
- Citizenship: US
- Occupations: Model, Television personality
- Years active: 2010–present
- Modeling information
- Height: 5 ft 4 in (1.63 m)
- Website: www.amymarkham.com

Amy Markham is an American model and television personality. She currently lives in Los Angeles, California.

== Early life ==
The daughter of an American father in the U.S. Army and a Korean mother, Markham was born in Seoul, South Korea. Her childhood was spent in Babenhausen, Germany, but due to her father's military duty, she was an "army brat" living all over. She spent the lengthiest amount of time in Killeen, Texas, which she considers her home town.

== Modeling career ==
Markham first began modeling in 2010, working in the Japanese import automotive scene as a print and spokesmodel for several companies, magazines and race events, including the Xtreme Drift Circuit Racing Series (a national drifting competition), Performance Auto and Sound Magazine and Ace Custom Steering. Her first mainstream magazine shoot was with Rukus magazine in the US. Following its publication, she has appeared in a number of other international publications, including Vogue, Maxim, FHM, GQ, Esquire and Gentleman. In 2013, she was named FHM Magazine's Most Wanted Model.

== Broadcasting career ==
In 2011, Markham became a host for Bite Me TV. A series exclusive to the web, Bite Me TV was broken into four series - Car Culture, Quick Bite!, Field Trippin and Bite Me! - the MAN cooking show. The show won an award for Outstanding Travel, Talk and Lifestyle Series at the 2011 LAWEBFEST. She went on to appear in the series Promo Girls on Telemundo. She has also made TV appearances for Anything That Rolls, a car-focused series on Channel 39 in Houston, TX.
