= Ministry of Information Technology, Electronics and Communications =

Minister of Information Technology, Electronics and Communications
- Samācāra Sāṅkētikata, Elakṭrāniks mariyu Kamyūnikēṣans Śākha Mantrī
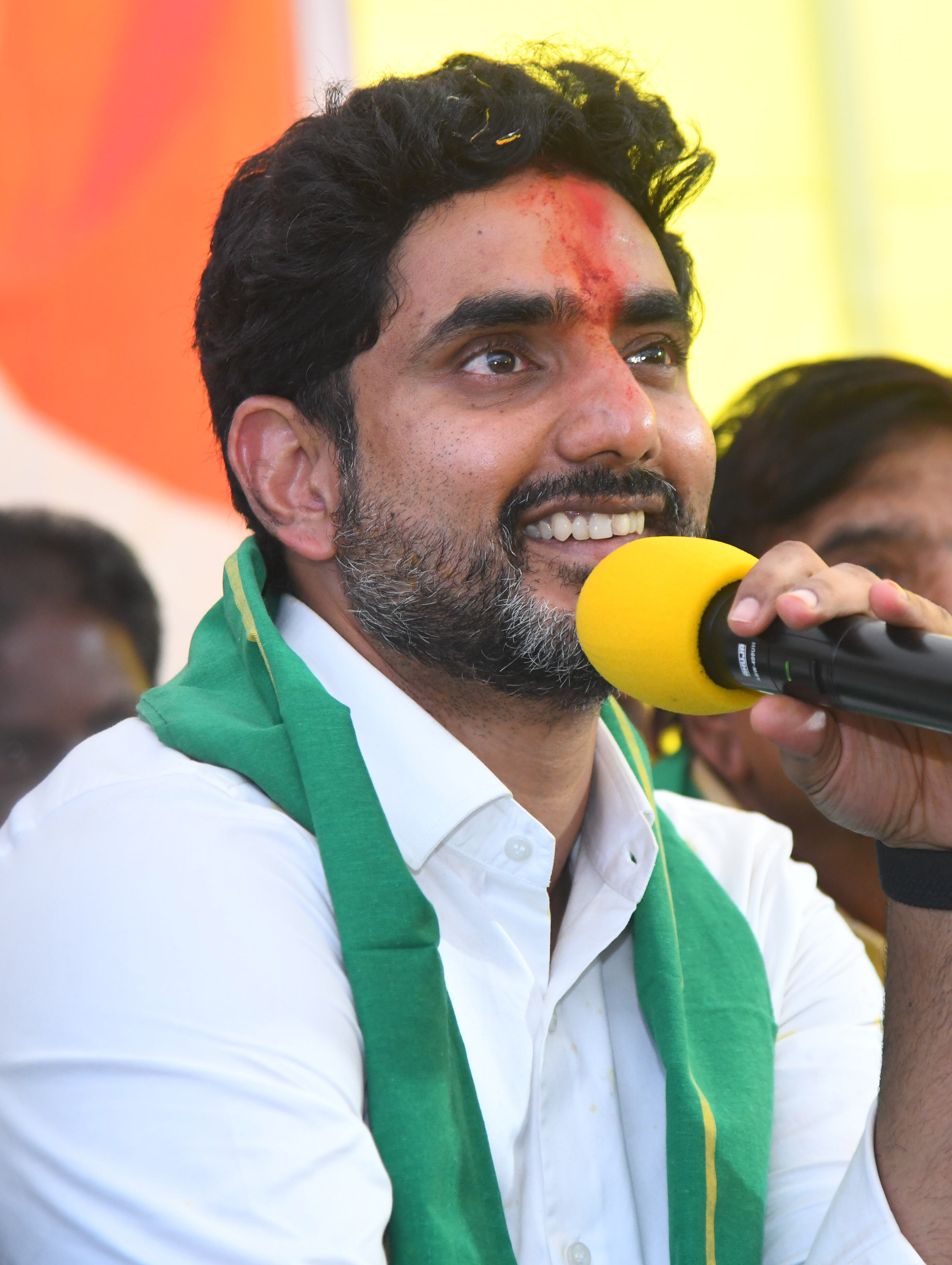
- Incumbent; Nara Lokesh since 12 June 2024
- Department of Information Technology, Electronics and Communications
- Abbreviation: ITE&C
- Member of: Andha Pradesh Cabinet
- Reports to: Governor of Andhra Pradesh; Chief Minister of Andhra Pradesh; Andhra Pradesh Legislature
- Appointer: Governor of Andhra Pradesh on the advice of the Chief Minister of Andhra Pradesh
- Precursor: Department of Information Technology and Communications
- Inaugural holder: Bojjala Gopala Krishna Reddy
- Formation: 10 April 2000
- Website: Official website

The Ministry of Information Technology, Electronics and Communications (ITE&C) is an executive agency of the Government of Andhra Pradesh. The current IT Minister of Andhra Pradesh is Nara Lokesh.

== History ==
The Information Technology Wing was created as part of the Finance & Planning (Plg. Wing) Department vide G.O.Rt.No.2125, General Administration (Special.A) Department, dated: 09-05-1997. During April 2000 the IT&C Department was given an independent status vide G.O.Ms.NO.133, General Administration (AR&T.I) Department, dated: 10.04.2000. The organizational structure of the ITE&C Department, along with the creation and filling of posts, was formally established through G.O. Ms. No. 12, dated 11 September 2000, issued by the Information Technology and Communications Department.

The nomenclature of the Department has been changed as Information Technology, Electronics & Communications Department vide G.O.Ms.No.575 General Administration (AR&T.I) Department, Dated:24.07.2013.

== Acts ==
- Information Technology - The Andhra Pradesh Core Digital Data Authority (Effective Delivery of e-Services) Act, 2017

== Rules ==
- Information Technology - The Andhra Pradesh Information Technology (Electronic Service Delivery) Rules, 2011
- Information Technology - The Andhra Pradesh Core Digital Data Authority (Effective Delivery of e-Services) - Rules (Terms and Conditions of Service of Chairperson and Members)

== Heads of the Departments ==
- Director of Electronic Services Delivery

== Autonomous organisations ==
The following are the autonomous organisations functioning under the Department of Information Technology, Electronics and Communications, Government of Andhra Pradesh:

=== Communication ===
- Society for Andhra Pradesh Network (SAPNET)

=== Electronics ===
- Andhra Pradesh Electronics & IT Agency (APEITA)

=== Information Technology ===
- Andhra Pradesh Technology Services Ltd. (APTS)
- e-Pragati Authority (formerly e-Governance Authority)
- Andhra Pradesh Innovation Society (APIS)
- Andhra Pradesh Information Technology Academy (APITA)
- Andhra Pradesh Information Technology Academy (formerly Institute for Electronic Governance (IEG))
- Andhra Pradesh Core Digital Data Authority (Effective Delivery e-Service)
- International Institute of Digital Technologies (IIDT)

=== Space and Satellite Applications ===
- Andhra Pradesh Space Applications Centre (APSAC)

== List of ministers ==
Key

- ^{†} Assassinated or died in office

#	Portrait	Minister (Lifespan) Constituency	Term of office			Election (Term)	Party	Ministry	Chief Minister	Ref.
#	Portrait	Minister (Lifespan) Constituency	Term start	Term end	Duration	Election (Term)	Party	Ministry	Chief Minister	Ref.
1		Palle Raghunatha Reddy MLA for Puttaparthi	8 June 2014	1 April 2017	2 years, 297 days	2014 (14th)	Telugu Desam Party	Naidu III	N. Chandrababu Naidu	
2		Nara Lokesh (born 1983); MLC	2 April 2017	29 May 2019	2 years, 57 days	2014 (14th)	Telugu Desam Party	Naidu III	N. Chandrababu Naidu	
3		Mekapati Goutham Reddy (1971–2022); MLA for Atmakur	19 June 2019	21 February 2022 ^{†}	2 years, 247 days	2019 (15th)	YSR Congress Party	Jagan	Y. S. Jagan Mohan Reddy	
4		Gudivada Amarnath MLA for Anakapalli	11 April 2022	6 June 2024	2 years, 56 days	2019 (15th)	YSR Congress Party	Jagan	Y. S. Jagan Mohan Reddy	
(2)		Nara Lokesh (born 1983); MLA for Mangalagiri	12 June 2024	Incumbent	2 years, 88 days	2024 (16th)	Telugu Desam Party	Naidu IV	N. Chandrababu Naidu	
