= Gentleman (magazine) =

Indian magazine

- Cover dated October 1999. Essential Listening -A Collector's issue.
- Editor: Sambit Bal
- Categories: Indian magazines
- Frequency: Monthly
- Publisher: Express Publications (Madurai) Ltd
- Founded: 1980
- Final issue: 2001
- Company: Indian Express Group
- Country: India
- Language: English

Gentleman was an English language literary magazine published in India from 1980 to 2001. Its founder-editor was Minhaz Merchant of the Sterling Publications, which sold this and other magazines to the Indian Express Group in 1987. It was edited and published by Sambit Bal and Rajib Sarkar.

Although the name of the magazine suggested a male-oriented magazine, Gentleman was anything but. They had to stick to the name due to corporate red-tape, and as a relief, used the tagline "Gentleman: Mindspace for Men".

== Features ==
The magazine featured hardcore intellectual content, and was the only such magazine in its genre in India at that time. It went beyond its ambit of being a 'men's' magazine and published stories on current affairs, social issues, in-depth journalism, crime, politics, food, music, movies, poetry, arts, fiction (including Comics) and personalities. Cover stories were highly acclaimed by the intellectual readers of the magazine. Most of the issues had a cover theme, for instance: "36 Most Under-rated Movies", and "Nine tomorrows" (a science fiction issue) and included articles from guest contributors.

== Writers ==
Gentleman groomed a set of journalists and writers who found an outlet and an audience for stories that might have otherwise been considered offbeat or 'alternative' by the Indian Mainstream media. Some names associated with Gentleman magazine were:

- Shashi Tharoor
- Ayesha Banerjee
- Romola Butalia
- Anurag Mathur
- Atul Dev
- David Davidar
- Harish C. Mehta
- Pradeep Sebastian (Entertainment Editor)
- Madhu Kishwar
- Shailaja Bajpai
- Jaideep Varma
- Rohit Gupta
- Farzana Versey
- Varsha Bhosle
- Premnath Nair (Deputy Editor)
- Amit Varma
- Baiju Parthan
- Ajit Duara
- Niranjan Kaushik
- Jeet Thayil
- Leslie Mathew
- Dibyojyoti Haldar
- Prashant C Trikannad (Assistant Editor)
- Simran Shroff (Features Editor)

== Illustrators ==
- Sarnath Banerjee
- George Mathen
- Manjula Padmanabhan
