= Ponnamanda =

- village
- Interactive map of Ponnamanda
- Location in Andhra Pradesh, India Ponnamanda (India)
- Coordinates: 16.4450°N 81.9262°E
- Country: India
- State: Andhra Pradesh
- District: Konaseema

Area
  - Total: 12 km^{2} (4.6 sq mi)

Population (2011)
  - Total: 7,822
  - Density: 667/km^{2} (1,730/sq mi)

Languages
  - Official: Telugu
- Time zone: UTC+5:30 (IST)
- Postal code: 533 446

Ponnamanda is a village in Razole Mandal, Dr. B.R. Ambedkar Konaseema district in the state of Andhra Pradesh in India.

== Geography ==
Ponnamanda is located at 16.4450°N 81.9262°E.

== Demographics ==
As of 2011 India census, Ponnamanda had a population of 7822, out of which 3884 were male and 3938 were female. The population of children below 6 years of age was 9%. The literacy rate of the village was 80%.
