= Sivakodu =

Sivakoti
- village
- Interactive map of Sivakoti
- Location in Andhra Pradesh, India Sivakoti (India)
- Coordinates: 16.4633°N 81.8269°E
- Country: India
- State: Andhra Pradesh
- District: Dr. B.R. Ambedkar Konaseema

Area
  - Total: 14 km^{2} (5.4 sq mi)

Population (2011)
  - Total: 7,961
  - Density: 589/km^{2} (1,530/sq mi)

Languages
  - Official: Telugu
- Time zone: UTC+5:30 (IST)
- Postal code: 533 446

Sivakoti is a village in Razole Mandal, Dr. B.R. Ambedkar Konaseema district in the state of Andhra Pradesh in India.

== Geography ==
Sivakoti is located at 16.4633°N 81.8269°E.

== Demographics ==
As of 2011 India census, Sivakodu had a population of 7961, out of which 4002 were male and 3959 were female. The population of children below 6 years of age was 9%. The literacy rate of the village was 82%.
