= Sompalle =

- village
- Interactive map of Sompalle
- Location in Andhra Pradesh, India Sompalle (India)
- Coordinates: 16.4836°N 81.8519°E
- Country: India
- State: Andhra Pradesh
- District: Dr. B.R. Ambedkar Konaseema

Area
  - Total: 1 km^{2} (0.39 sq mi)

Population (2011)
  - Total: 3,052
  - Density: 2,565/km^{2} (6,640/sq mi)

Languages
  - Official: Telugu
- Time zone: UTC+5:30 (IST)
- Postal code: 533 446

Sompalle is a village in Razole Mandal, Dr. B.R. Ambedkar Konaseema district in the state of Andhra Pradesh in India.

== Geography ==
Sompalle is located at 16.4836°N 81.8519°E.

== Demographics ==
As of 2011 India census, Sompalle had a population of 3052, out of which 1599 were male and 1453 were female. The population of children below 6 years of age was 10%. The literacy rate of the village was 84%.
