= Nandeeswarudu =

- Theatrical release poster
- Directed by: Anji Sreenu Yarajala
- Screenplay by: Anji Sreenu Yarajala
- Story by: Anji Sreenu Yarajala; Ravi Bhillagari
- Based on: Deadly Soma
- Produced by: Dr. Kota Gangadhar Reddy; Segu Ramesh Babu
- Starring: Nandamuri Taraka Ratna; Jagapathi Babu; Sheena Shahabadi
- Cinematography: N. Sudhakar Reddy
- Edited by: K. V. Krishna Reddy
- Music by: Parthasaradhi
- Production companies: KFC & SRB Art Productions
- Release date: 15 January 2012
- Running time: 158 minutes
- Country: India
- Language: Telugu

Nandeeswarudu is a 2012 Indian Telugu-language action film produced by Kota Gangadhar Reddy & Segu Ramesh Babu on KFC & SRB Art Productions banner and directed by Sreeenu Yarajala. The film stars Nandamuri Taraka Ratna, Jagapathi Babu, Sheena Shahabadi, and music composed by Parthasarathy. It is a remake of the 2005 Kannada film Deadly Soma. The film recorded as a flop at box-office.

== Plot ==
The film begins with Nandeswara / Nandu, a crime lord whose existence makes it hard to defile the government. So, the Home Minister sets a target of wiping out him through a sheer cop, Commissioner Eeswar Prasad. Eeswar Prasad is a sincere & daredevil as well as a jokester. At present, he pays attention to Nandu's past. Nandu is a resident of an adjacent village; his father, Ananda Bhupati, is an arbiter and the forefront of that territory. He leads a delightful life with a conscientious joint family, and his mother Lakshmi aspires him to see as IPS officer. To achieve it, Nandu lands in the city where he crushes Pragati. Meanwhile, Ranga Rao, father-in-law of Nandu's sibling Sivaji humiliates and boots Ananda Bhupati. Knowing it, Nandu breaks his leg and must pay the penalty.

Soon after the release, Nandu knocks back to reach home as he cannot enter the premises as a criminal. Plus, the oath given to his mother obstructs him. He gets back to the city and stays with his friends. After which, he spots the malevolent forces prevailing around under the charge of diabolic goon Babanna and his acolytes Vasanth & Naganna. Once, Vasanth mortifies his friend Seenu's mother, Yashoda, and chops the hand of boy Chinna, who shares a close intimacy with Nandu. At that point, enraged Nandu decapitates him and, following, slaughters Naganna too. From there, the public started adoring him, and he sought justice for people in need affected by the failure of the law & order system.

Now, Eeswar Prasad gives Nandu an ultimatum and warns his family. Like a shot, they retort and feel proud of their son's eminence. Here, Eeswar Prasad, with the aid of the Chief Minister, seeks approval to eliminate the ruffians in the city and dethrone the Home Minister. Accordingly, the Home Minister mingles with Babannaa and ploys to slay Nandu when his friend Saleem dies. Hence, Nandu onslaughts and ceases them. Later, Eeswar Prasad arrives and encounters Nandu. Next, Eeswara Prasad is assigned a new mission. To attain it, he solicits the support of a dynamic officer; therein, Nandu enters as a cop. Indeed, Eeswar Prasad has made a fake encounter, removed the charges on Nandu, and molded him into a Police. At last, Nandu and his family express their gratitude to Eeswar Prasad. The movie ends on a happy note with the marriage of Nandu & Pragati.

== Cast ==
- Nandamuri Taraka Ratna as Nandeeswarudu / Nandu
- Jagapathi Babu as Commissioner Eeswar Prasad
- Sheena Shahabadi
- Suman as Ananda Bhupathi
- M. Balayah as Satya Murthy
- Chalapathi Rao as DGP
- Ajay as Babanna
- Nagineedu as Home Minister
- Rajiv Kanakala as Saleem
- Banerjee as Banerjee
- G. V. Sudhakar Naidu as Vasanth
- Mukthar Khan as Naganna
- Vijayachander as CM
- Prabhas Sreenu as Seenu
- Sivaji Raja as Sivaji
- Director Sarath as Sarath
- Kota Shankar Rao as Ranga Rao
- Seeta as Lakshmi
- Delhi Rajeswari as Yashoda
- Lahari as Lahari
- Jayavani as Bangaram
- Rachana Maurya as an item number
- Master Athulith as Young Nadeswarudu

== Soundtrack ==
Film score by Parthasaradhi
- Released: 2011
- Genre: Soundtrack
- Length: 28:52
- Label: Aditya Music
- Producer: Parthasarathy

Music composed by Parthasaradhi. Lyrics are written by Ram Paidesetti. The music released on ADITYA Music Company.

No.	Title	Singer(s)	Length
1.	"Racha Racha"	Ranjith	4:29
2.	"Naa Rupe Mirchi"	Sravana Bhargavi	4:33
3.	"Chettu Meeda"	Parthu, Sunitha	4:28
4.	"Bindas Bindas"	Parthu	3:55
5.	"Adire Andalu"	Nandamuri Taraka Ratna, Kalpana	4:17
6.	"Yegire"	M. M. Keeravani	2:44
7.	"Nandeeswarudu"	S. P. Balasubrahmanyam	4:12
Total length:			28:52
