= Okato Number Kurraadu =

Okato Number Kurradu
- Official poster
- Directed by: A. Kodandarami Reddy
- Screenplay by: K. Raghavendra Rao
- Story by: Akula Shiva
- Produced by: K. Raghavendra Rao; C. Aswani Dutt
- Starring: Taraka Ratna; Rekha Vedavyas
- Cinematography: V. Srinivasa Reddy
- Edited by: Kotagiri Venkateswara Rao
- Music by: M. M. Keeravani
- Production company: Swapna Cinema
- Release date: 18 September 2002
- Running time: 137 mins
- Country: India
- Language: Telugu

Okato Number Kurraadu (transl. Number one boy) is a 2002 Indian Telugu-language romantic drama film directed by A. Kodandarami Reddy and starring newcomer Taraka Ratna and Rekha.

== Cast ==
- Taraka Ratna as Balu
- Rekha as Swapna
- Tanikella Bharani as Swapna's father
- Rajeev Kanakala as Rajeev
- Devadas Kanakala as Rajeev's father
- Giribabu as Swapna's uncle
- Chitram Srinu
- MS Narayana
- Dharmavarapu Subramanyam
- Sunil
- Chitti Babu
- Raghu Babu

== Production ==
This was the second film Taraka Ratna shot for but ended up releasing first. The film was initially titled 1va Number Kurraadu.

== Soundtrack ==
Music was composed by M. M. Keeravani and lyrics were written by Chandrabose and Suddala Ashok Teja.

- "Thodakotti Chebutunna" - S. P. Balasubrahmanyam, Godwin
- "Nuvvu Choodu Choodakapo" - M. M. Keeravani, Ganga
- "Orey Nuvvu" - S. P. B. Charan, K. S. Chitra
- "Aggipulla" - Tippu, Kalpana
- "Nemali Kannoda" - Udit Narayan, K. S. Chitra
- "Enni Janmalettinaa - S. P. Balasubrahmanyam, K. S. Chitra

== Reception ==
Gudipoodi Srihari of The Hindu wrote, "He [Taraka Ratna] impresses with acting, dancing and fighting, the essential ingredients of modern cinema. But the theme is ordinary, narrating a routine story" and called M. M. Keeravani's music "a redeeming factor". Jeevi of Idlebrain.com wrote, "The film starts with an interesting incident [...] But the scenes shown in between are not good enough make viewers excited". A critic from Full Hyderabad opined, "As a movie, Okato Number Kurraadu sucks. That's because it has nothing new by way of a script, remorselessly follows an earlier movie by the same filmmakers".
