= Mulikipalle =

- village
- Interactive map of Mulikipalle
- Location in Andhra Pradesh, India Mulikipalle (India)
- Coordinates: 16.4412°N 81.8839°E
- Country: India
- State: Andhra Pradesh
- District: Konaseema

Area
  - Total: 2 km^{2} (0.77 sq mi)

Population (2011)
  - Total: 2,468
  - Density: 1,216/km^{2} (3,150/sq mi)

Languages
  - Official: Telugu
- Time zone: UTC+5:30 (IST)
- Postal code: 533 446

Mulikipalle is a village in Razole Mandal, Dr. B.R. Ambedkar Konaseema district in the state of Andhra Pradesh in India.

== Geography ==
Mulikipalle is located at 16.4412°N 81.8839°E.

== Demographics ==
As of 2011 India census, Mulikipalle had a population of 1206, out of which 3884 were male and 1262 were female. The population of children below 6 years of age was 10%. The literacy rate of the village was 79%.
