= Palagummi, Razole Mandal =

Palagummi
- village
- Interactive map of Palagummi
- Location in Andhra Pradesh, India Palagummi (India)
- Coordinates: 16.4755°N 81.8775°E
- Country: India
- State: Andhra Pradesh
- District: Dr. B.R. Ambedkar Konaseema

Area
  - Total: 2 km^{2} (0.77 sq mi)

Population (2011)
  - Total: 960
  - Density: 525/km^{2} (1,360/sq mi)

Languages
  - Official: Telugu
- Time zone: UTC+5:30 (IST)
- Postal code: 533 446

Palagummi is a village in Razole Mandal, Dr. B.R. Ambedkar Konaseema district in the state of Andhra Pradesh in India.

== Geography ==
Palagummi is located at 16.4755°N 81.8775°E.

== Demographics ==
As of 2011 India census, Palagummi had a population of 930, out of which 458 were male and 502 were female. The population of children below 6 years of age was 9%. The literacy rate of the village was 84%.
