= Razole mandal =

Coordinates: 16.46°N 81.87°E

- Mandal
- Interactive map outlining mandal
- Country: India
- State: Andhra Pradesh
- District: Dr. B.R. Ambedkar Konaseema
- Population according to 2011 Census: 71,433
- Number of Villages: 13
- Area in Sq Km: 77.34
- Time zone: UTC+5:30 (IST)

Razole mandal is one of the 22 mandals in Dr. B.R. Ambedkar Konaseema district of Andhra Pradesh. As per census 2011, there are 13 villages in this mandal.

== Demographics ==
Razole mandal has total population of 71,433 as per the 2011 Census out of which 35,468 are males while 35,965 are females. The average sex ratio is 1014. The total literacy rate is 83%.

== Towns and villages ==
=== Villages ===
1. B. Savaram
2. Chintalapalle
3. Kadali
4. Katrenipadu
5. Kunavaram
6. Mulikipalle
7. Palagummi
8. Podalada
9. Ponnamanda
10. Razole
11. Sivakodu
12. Sompalle
13. Tatipaka

== See also ==
- List of mandals in Andhra Pradesh
