= Kadali, Razole Mandal =

Kadali
- village
- Interactive map of Kadali
- Location in Andhra Pradesh, India Kadali (India)
- Coordinates: 16.4632°N 81.8915°E
- Country: India
- State: Andhra Pradesh
- District: Dr. B.R. Ambedkar Konaseema

Area
  - Total: 18 km^{2} (6.9 sq mi)

Population (2011)
  - Total: 8,648
  - Density: 492/km^{2} (1,270/sq mi)

Languages
  - Official: Telugu
- Time zone: UTC+5:30 (IST)
- Postal code: 533 446

Kadali is a village in Razole Mandal, Dr. B.R. Ambedkar Konaseema district in the state of Andhra Pradesh in India.

== Geography ==
Kadali is located at 16.4632°N 81.8915°E.

== Demographics ==
As of 2011 India census, Kadali had a population of 8648, out of which 4318 were male and 4330 were female. The population of children below 6 years of age was 10%. The literacy rate of the village was 83%.
