= 9 Hours =

2022 web series

- Promotional release poster
- Genre: Crime drama
- Created by: Krish Jagarlamudi
- Based on: Tommidi Gantalu by Malladi Venkata Krishna Murthy
- Written by: Krish Jagarlamudi
- Directed by: Niranjan Kaushik; Jacob Verghese
- Starring: Taraka Ratna; Ajay; Madhu Shalini; Ravi Varma; Ravi Prakash; Sritej
- Composer: Shakthi Kanth Karthick
- Country of origin: India
- Original language: Telugu
- No. of seasons: 1
- No. of episodes: 9

Production
- Executive producer: Rohith Pisapati
- Producers: Y. Rajeev Reddy; Saibabu Jagarlamudi
- Production location: India
- Cinematography: Manojh Reddy Katasani
- Editor: Dharmendra Kakarala
- Production company: First Frame Entertainments

Original release
- Network: Disney+ Hotstar
- Release: 2 June 2022

9 Hours is an Indian Telugu-language survival crime thriller television series created by Krish Jagarlamudi, directed by Niranjan Kaushik with an ensemble cast of Taraka Ratna, Madhu Shalini, Ajay, Ravi Varma and Ravi Prakash. The series' basic plot line was adapted from the famous Telugu crime novel "Thommidi Ghantalu," authored by Malladi Venkata Krishna Murthy. 9 Hours premiered on Disney+ Hotstar on 2 June 2022.

== Cast ==
- Taraka Ratna as CI Prathap
- Ajay as Dasarath Ramayya
- Madhu Shalini as Chitralekha; wife of Prathap
- Ravi Varma as Nagendra
- Pandu as Young Nagendra
- Ravi Prakash as Shivaji
- Ankith Koyya as Nandakumar "Nandu"
- Vinod Kumar Alva as Jailor Viswanath
- Sritej as Poorna
- Sameer as Chandrasekhar
- Preethi Asrani as Sravani
- Banerjee as ACP Krishnamachari
- Parvathi Nirban as Girija
- Chitram Srinu as Koti
- Gemini Suresh as Chidambaram
- Vajja Venkata Giridhar
- Achyuth Kumar as prisoner
- Suresh Kumar as P. Indrasena Rao; manager of Deccan Imperial Bank
- Jwala Koti as Ambaji Rao
- Naga Mahesh as Munuswamy Naidu
- Siddharth Gollapudi as Dr. Paul
- Venkata Giridhar as Purushottam
- Monika Reddy as Suguna
- Roopa Hegde as Meherunnisa

== Episodes ==
No.	Title	Directed by	Written by	Original release date
1	"Hour 01"	Niranjan Kaushik; Jacob Verghese	Krish Jagarlamudi	June 2, 2022
2	"Hour 02"	Niranjan Kaushik; Jacob Verghese	Krish Jagarlamudi	June 2, 2022
3	"Hour 03"	Niranjan Kaushik; Jacob Verghese	Krish Jagarlamudi	June 2, 2022
4	"Hour 04"	Niranjan Kaushik; Jacob Verghese	Krish Jagarlamudi	June 2, 2022
5	"Hour 05"	Niranjan Kaushik; Jacob Verghese	Krish Jagarlamudi	June 2, 2022
6	"Hour 06"	Niranjan Kaushik; Jacob Verghese	Krish Jagarlamudi	June 2, 2022
7	"Hour 07"	Niranjan Kaushik; Jacob Verghese	Krish Jagarlamudi	June 2, 2022
8	"Hour 08"	Niranjan Kaushik; Jacob Verghese	Krish Jagarlamudi	June 2, 2022
9	"Hour 09"	Niranjan Kaushik; Jacob Verghese	Krish Jagarlamudi	June 2, 2022

== Reception ==
Sangeetha Devi Dundoo of The Hindu in her review stated that "The payoffs in the form of twists and turns happen rather late and are not enough. Perhaps it was alluring to have nine episodes to befit the title, but the series could have done with liberal trimming". Echoing the same, Pinkvilla's Arvind V opined that "The survival drama trappings deserved a better canvas, and a profound script. Torture and beatings are no substitute for thrills and drama".

Comparing it with Money Heist, Latha Srinivasan of Firstpost praised the performances of the ensemble cast while criticizing the screenplay and writing. Giving a mixed review, Neeshita Nyayapati of The Times of India wrote that "You don't always buy what 9 Hours is selling you, there are moments you will pause and wonder how plausible whatever is playing out on screen is. But the series does manage to do its job by keeping you engaged".
