= Bhadradri Ramudu =

- Theatrical release poster
- Directed by: Suresh Krissna
- Written by: Posani Krishna Murali
- Produced by: Maganti Gopinath
- Starring: Taraka Ratna; Radhika; Vanisri
- Cinematography: Pratap
- Edited by: Marthand K. Venkatesh
- Music by: Sri
- Production company: Divya Akshata Naga Movies
- Release date: 25 May 2004
- Running time: 157 minutes
- Country: India
- Language: Telugu

Bhadradri Ramudu is a 2004 Indian Telugu romantic action film directed by Suresh Krissna and starring Taraka Ratna, Radhika, and Vanisri. The music composed by Sri.

== Cast ==
- Taraka Ratna as Bhadradri Ramudu
- Radhika as Seetha
- Vanisri as Jagadamba
- Ali
- Posani Krishna Murali
- Venu Madhav
- Rajitha
- Mallikarjuna Rao
- Chalapathi Rao
- Sudhakar
- KR Vijaya
- J. V. Ramana Murthi
- Ragini

== Production ==
The film was tenatively titled Bhadadri Ramudu in mid-2003. The makers of the film initially were going to have N. T. Rama Rao feature as Taraka Ratna's grandfather using graphics. Vanisri plays Taraka Ratna's arrogant aunt in the film.

== Soundtrack ==
The music was composed by Sri with lyrics by Veturi Sundararama Murthy. The music release function was held on 14 May 2004.

Track listing
| No. | Title | Singer(s) | Length |
|---|---|---|---|
| 1. | "Kondantha Vaadu" | S. P. Balasubrahmanyam | 5:05 |
| 2. | "Rama Rama Sita Sita" | Nitya Santhoshini | 2:22 |
| 3. | "Sitakoka Chilakamma" | S. P. Balasubrahmanyam, Nitya Santhoshini | 4:52 |
| 4. | "Jai Sri Ramachandra Murthiniki" | Nitya Santhoshini | 1:46 |
| 5. | "Mullokambula" | S. P. Balasubrahmanyam | 1:41 |
| 6. | "Sitakoka Chilakamma" (Bit) | S. P. Balasubrahmanyam | 3:12 |
| 7. | "Sri Ramachandra" | S. P. Balasubrahmanyam | 2:09 |
| 8. | "Bhamaro Nee Andam" | S. P. Balasubrahmanyam, Nitya Santhoshini | 5:04 |
| 9. | "Sitakoka Chilakamma" (Sad) | S. P. Balasubrahmanyam | 5:10 |
| Total length: | | | 31:23 |

== Reception ==
Jeevi of Idlebrain wrote "First half of the film is boring. Second half is slightly better, though lengthy. The excessive usage of NTR's photo in the first half and unnecessary references to Vamsam sounds clichéd". Telugu Cinema wrote "Director Suresh Krishna disappoints the movie lovers with his work. The screenplay is completely predictable. Direction is mediocre. There is no touch of Suresh Krishna in this film".
