= Katrenipadu =

Katrevupadu
- village
- Interactive map of Katrevupadu
- Location in Andhra Pradesh, India Katrevupadu (India)
- Coordinates: 16.4241°N 81.9215°E
- Country: India
- State: Andhra Pradesh
- District: Dr. B. R. Ambedkar Konaseema district

Area
  - Total: 5 km^{2} (1.9 sq mi)

Population (2011)
  - Total: 4,258
  - Density: 848/km^{2} (2,200/sq mi)

Languages
  - Official: Telugu
- Time zone: UTC+5:30 (IST)
- Postal code: 533 446

Katrenipadu (Katrevupadu in Census 2011 records) is a village in Razole Mandal,Dr. B.R. Ambedkar Konaseema district in the state of Andhra Pradesh in India.

== Geography ==
Katrenipadu is located at 16.4241°N 81.9215°E.

== Demographics ==
As of 2011 India census, Katrenipadu had a population of 4258, out of which 2159 were male and 2099 were female. The population of children below 6 years of age was 9%. The literacy rate of the village was 83%.
