= Yuva Rathna =

- Official poster
- Directed by: Uppalapati Narayana Rao
- Written by: Satish Vegesna (dialogues)
- Screenplay by: Uppalapati Narayana Rao
- Story by: Satish Vegesna
- Produced by: Nandamuri Ramakrishna
- Starring: Taraka Ratna; Jividha
- Cinematography: V. Srinivasa Reddy
- Edited by: Kotagiri Venkateswara Rao
- Music by: M. M. Keeravani
- Production company: Rama Krishna Horticulture Cine Studios
- Release date: 29 November 2002
- Country: India
- Language: Telugu

Yuva Rathna is a 2002 Indian Telugu-language romantic drama film directed by Uppalapati Narayana Rao and starring Taraka Ratna and Jividha.

== Plot ==
Rathna, a brat, spends a night with Sandhya and later cooks up a story to all his friends that he slept with her. However, he soon regrets his lie as Sandhya's marriage gets ruined as a result.

== Cast ==
- Taraka Ratna as Rathna
- Jividha Sharma as Sandhya
- Chandramohan as Rathna's father
- Tanikella Bharani
- L. B. Sriram
- M. S. Narayana
- Sunil
- Chitram Srinu
- Khayyum
- Sudha
- Sana
- Krishnapriya
- Nandamuri Harikrishna as voiceover
- Nandamuri Balakrishna as voiceover

== Production ==
This was the first film Taraka Ratna shot for but ended up releasing second. Harikrishna gave a voiceover before the film starts about the production house while Balakrishna gave a voiceover at the end of the film.

== Soundtrack ==
The soundtrack features five songs composed by M. M. Keeravani with lyrics by Chandrabose. R. P. Patnaik composed one song ("Chiru Chirugali") with lyrics by Kulasekhar. The audio launch was held on 20 October 2002. Taraka Ratna's uncles Harikrishna, Balakrishna, Ramakrishna, and Chandrababu Naidu graced the occasion.

No.	Title	Lyrics	Music	Singer(s)	Length
1.	"Needi 98480"	Chandrabose	M. M. Keeravani	Shaan, chorus
2.	"Sandhya Sandhya"	Chandrabose	M. M. Keeravani	KK, Hrithika
3.	"Sakhiya"	Chandrabose	M. M. Keeravani	Kumar Sanu
4.	"Ammagari Nannagari"	Chandrabose	M. M. Keeravani	M. M. Keeravani
5.	"Sannajaji Puvva"	Chandrabose	M. M. Keeravani	Sadhana Sargam, Kalyani Malik
6.	"Chiru Chirugali"	Kulasekhar	R. P. Patnaik	R. P. Patnaik

== Release and reception ==
The film released in November 2002.

Gudipoodi Srihari of The Hindu opined that "Director Uppalapati Narayana Rao known for his imaginative film making lets us down this time, mainly due to bad story and dialogue" and additionally criticised the acting of the lead pair and the music. Jeevi of Idlebrain.com said that "It's a below average film. But the hero of this film is a liability. And because of the hero, this below average film turns into a bad film".
