= Taraka Ratna =

Indian actor (1983–2023)

Nandamuri Taraka Ratna
- నందమూరి తారకరత్న
- Born: 22 February 1983; Hyderabad, Andhra Pradesh (now in Telangana), India
- Died: 18 February 2023 (aged 39); Bengaluru, Karnataka, India
- Occupation: Actor
- Years active: 2002–2023
- Spouse: Alekhya Reddy (m. 2012)
- Children: 3
- Family: Nandamuri family

Nandamuri Taraka Ratna (22 February 1983 – 18 February 2023) was an Indian actor who worked in Telugu cinema. After his debut in Okato Number Kurraadu (2003), he acted in several films as the lead actor and a few as the antagonist. He was a member of the Nandamuri family which is influential in Telugu cinema and politics. Taraka Ratna was also an aspiring politician from the Indian state of Andhra Pradesh, rooting for the Telugu Desam Party. He died on 18 February 2023 at the age of 39 at Narayana Institute of Cardiac Sciences, following severe health complications.

== Early life ==
Nandamuri Taraka Ratna was born on 22 February 1983 in Hyderabad, Andhra Pradesh. He was the son of Nandamuri Mohana Krishna, a cinematographer in Telugu cinema, and Nandamuri Shanti. He was the grandson of Telugu actor and former Chief Minister of Andhra Pradesh, N. T. Rama Rao, his wife Nandamuri Basavatarakam and N. Trivikrama Rao. He has a sister, Rupa.

Ratna was the cousin of actors Nandamuri Kalyan Ram and Jr. N.T.R, and politician Nara Lokesh. He is the nephew of actor and politician Nandamuri Balakrishna, actor and politician Nandamuri Harikrishna, politicians Daggubati Purandeswari, Daggubati Venkateswara Rao, and chief minister of Andhra Pradesh, N. Chandrababu Naidu. Fondly called "Obu" by his family, Taraka Ratna was reportedly preparing to contest the 2024 Andhra Pradesh Legislative Assembly Elections, according to Telugu Desam Party chief N. Chandrababu Naidu.

== Career ==
Ratna made his debut with Okato Number Kurraadu (2002), written and produced by K. Raghavendra Rao. During his debut, Taraka Ratna signed nine films at once as the lead (a record) including Yuva Rathna (2003), Taarak (2003), and Bhadradri Ramudu. His played the antagonist in Amaravathi (2009), for which he received a Nandi Award. He also acted in Nandeeswarudu, Maha Bhaktha Siriyala (2014), Venkatadri (2009), Kakatheeyudu (2019), Devineni (2021) and a TV series 9 Hours amongst others.

== Family ==
Taraka Ratna married Alekhya Reddy, a divorcee, on August 2, 2012, at the Sanghi Temple. She was a costume designer in one of his films where they met and fell in love. Despite both their families being against the marriage, they got married in the presence of a couple of friends and two family members from Alekhya's side. The couple had three children, a girl in 2013, and later a twin boy and girl.

== Illness and death ==
On 27 January 2023, he participated in a political road yatra Yuva Galam Padayatra event with his cousin Nara Lokesh in Kuppam, Andhra Pradesh. During the event, Ratna suffered a massive cardiac arrest and fainted. He was administered Cardio Pulmonary Resuscitation (CPR) and first aid. He was taken to a local hospital in Kuppam for treatment, and on the following day transferred to a specialized cardiac hospital in Bangalore. Heart specialists from USA were brought for his treatment, and procedures for Balloon Angioplasty, Intra Aortic Balloon Pump, vasoactive support, and other advanced cardio services were provided to him two days before his death.

Ratna died on 18 February 2023, at the age of 39 while undergoing treatment in Bangalore. He had spent twenty-three days in the hospital in critical condition. He died four days before his 40th birthday.

His body was moved from Bangalore to his house in Hyderabad. Later he was shifted to Film Chamber for his fans to visit. His cremation was conducted at Jubilee Hills Mahaprasthanam.

== Filmography ==
Year	Film	Role	Ref.
2002	Okato Number Kurraadu	Balu	First film
2002	Yuva Rathna	Ratna	
2003	Taarak	Taraka Ram	
2004	No	Shiva	
2004	Bhadradri Ramudu	Ramudu	
2006	Pakadai	Maasi	
2009	Amaravathi	Shrinu	
2009	Venkatadri	Venkatadri Nayudu	
2010	Mukkanti		
2011	Nandeeswarudu	Nandeeswarudu "Nandu"	
2012	Vijeta		
2012	Eduru Leni Alexander	Alexander	
2012	Choodaalani Cheppaalani		
2014	Maha Bhakta Siriyala	Shiva Datta / Siriyala	
2015	Kakatheeyudu	Soorya, Deva	
2016	Evaru	Shekar	
2016	Manamantha	Painter	
2016	Raja Cheyyi Vesthe	Manik	
2017	Kayyum Bhai	Sathya	
2017	Raja Meeru Keka	Nagaraju	
2021	Jai Sena		
2021	Devineni	Devineni Nehru	
2022	Saradhi	Saradhi	
2022	Mr. Taarak	Tarak	
2022	S5 No Exit	Subbu	Final film

=== Television ===
Year	Work	Role	Network
2022	9 Hours	CI Prathap	Disney+ Hotstar

== Awards ==
2009 – Nandi Award for Best Villain – Amaravathi
