= Niranjan Das =

Niranjan Das may refer to:

- Niranjan Das (politician) (fl. early 20th century), Hindu politician in the Afghan Emirate
- Niranjan Das (wrestler) (1931–2010s), Indian freestyle wrestler
