= Alla Ramakrishna Reddy =

Indian politician from Andhra Pradesh

Member of Legislative Assembly Andhra Pradesh
- In office 2014–2024
- Preceded by: Kandru Kamala
- Succeeded by: Nara Lokesh
- Constituency: Mangalagiri

Personal details
- Born: Pedakakani, Guntur district
- Party: YSR Congress Party (till 2023, 2024-)
- Other political affiliations: Indian National Congress (2024)
- Parents: Alla Dasaratha Rami Reddy (father); Alla Veera Raghavamma (mother)
- Relatives: Alla Ayodhya Rami Reddy (brother)
- Nickname: RK

Alla Ramakrishna Reddy, commonly known by his initials RK, is an Indian politician from Andhra Pradesh. He is former Member of Legislative Assembly, he represented Mangalagiri Assembly constituency as a Member of Legislative Assembly (MLA) in the Andhra Pradesh Legislative assembly from 2014 to 11 December 2023.

== Political career ==
Ramakrishna Reddy was a politician from YSR Congress Party. He contested in 2014 and 2019 elections for Andhra Pradesh Legislative Assembly from Mangalagiri constituency and has won both the elections. In 2014 elections, he won the election against Ganji Chiranjeevi with a meagre majority of 12 votes. In 2019 elections, he won against then-chief minister N. Chandrababu Naidu's son Nara Lokesh of Telugu Desam Party with a slender majority of 5,337 votes.

He has also served as the Chairman of the Andhra Pradesh Capital Region Development Authority (AP CRDA) from June 2019 until its reorganisation to form Amaravati Metropolitan Region Development Authority (AMRDA) on 1 August 2020.

On 11 December 2023, he resigned as MLA of Mangalagiri assembly constituency and left the YSRCP for personal reasons and joined the Indian National Congress in the presence of Y. S. Sharmila on 21 January 2024.

Alla Ramakrishna Reddy has rejoined the YSRCP in the presence of YS Jagan Mohan Reddy on 20 February 2024.

=== Assembly elections 2019 ===
2019 Andhra Pradesh Legislative Assembly election: Mangalagiri
Party	Candidate	Votes	%	±%
YSRCP	Alla Ramakrishna Reddy	1,08,464	47.47	+2.74
TDP	Nara Lokesh	1,03,127	45.14	+0.41
CPI	Muppalla Nageswararao	10,135	4.5	
BJP	Jaggarapu Rammohanrao	1119	1.5	
Majority		5,337	2.33%	
Turnout		2,28,469	85.45	
YSRCP hold		Swing		

=== Assembly elections 2014 ===
2014 Andhra Pradesh Legislative Assembly election: Mangalagiri
Party	Candidate	Votes	%	±%
YSRCP	Alla Ramakrishna Reddy	88,977	44.73	
TDP	Ganji Chiranjeevi	88,965	44.73	
Majority		12	0.000001	
Turnout		1,98,941	89.48	8.93
YSRCP gain from INC		Swing		
