= Vemulapalli Srikrishna =

Vemulapalli Srikrishna (1917 – 8 April 2000) was a communist leader, and led a number of labour movements. He wrote the famous poem about Andhra Cheyyethi Jai kottu Telugoda! Gatamentho Ghana keerthi kalavoda. He was also the editor of the Telugu news daily "Visalandhra" from 1968 to 1972.

Srikrishna won a seat in the Andhra Pradesh Legislative Assembly in its 1962 elections, defeating Congress candidate Sri Tamma Ranga Reddy. In the 1972 elections, he represented the Communist Party of India (CPI), defeating independent candidate Sri Gujjula Gangadhara Reddy. During his second tenure, Srikrishna was the Leader of the Opposition in the Assembly. He was the only MLA who represented this constituency while serving as Opposition leader.
