= Nara Lokesh =

Indian politician (born 1983)

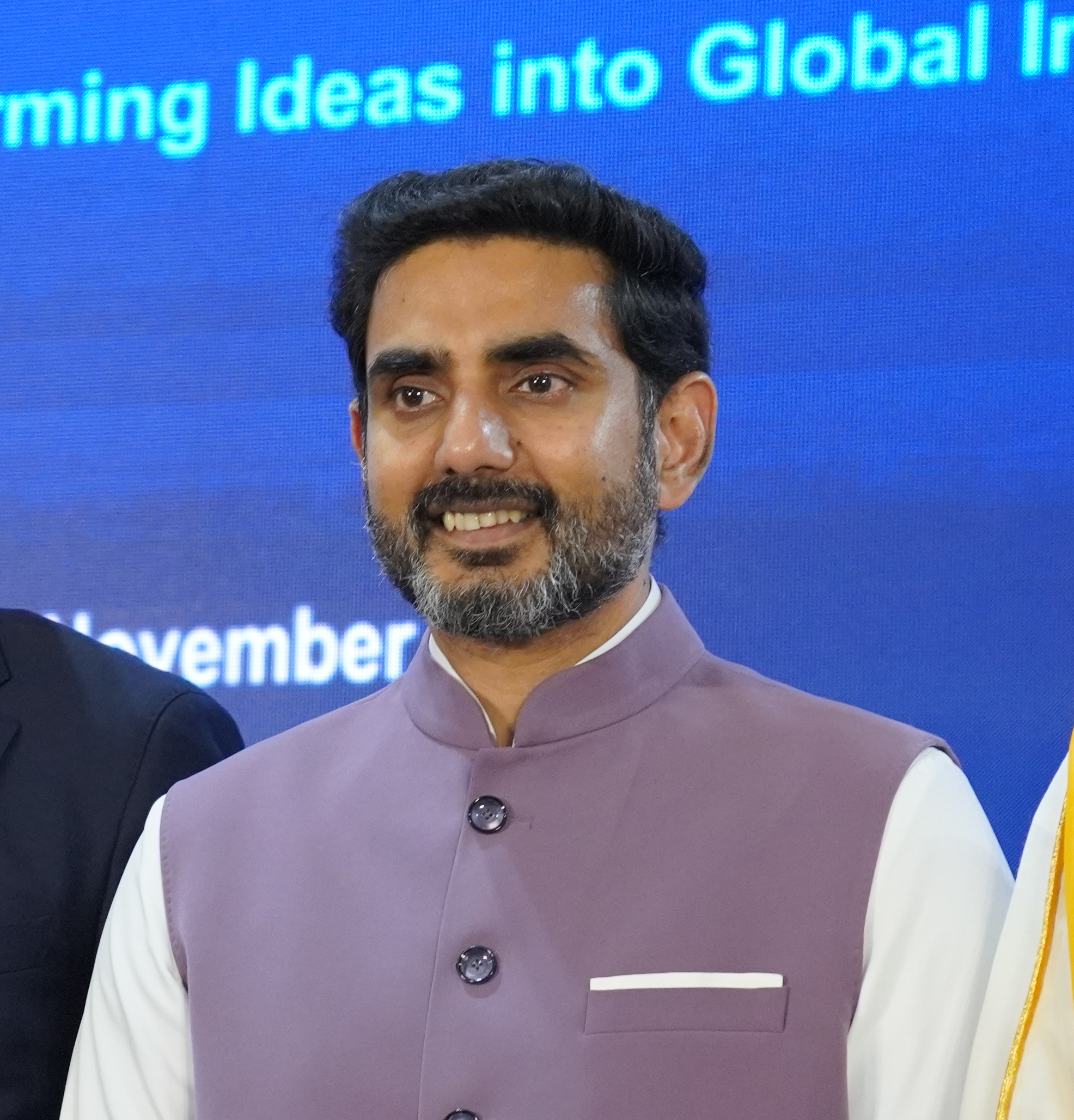
- Lokesh in 2025

National Working President of Telugu Desam Party
- Incumbent
- Assumed office 15 April 2026
- National President: N. Chandrababu Naidu
- Preceded by: Position established

Minister of Human Resources Development Government of Andhra Pradesh
- Incumbent
- Assumed office 12 June 2024
- Governor: S. Abdul Nazeer
- Chief Minister: N. Chandrababu Naidu
- Preceded by: Botsa Satyanarayana

Minister of Information Technology, Electronics and Communications; Real Time Governance Government of Andhra Pradesh
- Incumbent
- Assumed office 12 June 2024
- Governor: S. Abdul Nazeer
- Chief Minister: Nara Chandrababu Naidu
- Preceded by: Gudivada Amarnath
- In office 2 April 2017 – 29 May 2019
- Governor: E. S. L. Narasimhan
- Chief Minister: N. Chandrababu Naidu
- Preceded by: Palle Raghunatha Reddy
- Succeeded by: Mekapati Goutham Reddy

Member of Legislative Assembly, Andhra Pradesh
- Incumbent
- Assumed office 4 June 2024
- Preceded by: Alla Ramakrishna Reddy
- Constituency: Mangalagiri

Minister of Panchayat Raj and Rural Development Government of Andhra Pradesh
- In office 2 April 2017 – 29 May 2019
- Governor: E. S. L. Narasimhan
- Chief Minister: N. Chandrababu Naidu
- Preceded by: Chintakayala Ayyanna Patrudu
- Succeeded by: Peddireddy Ramachandra Reddy

Member of Legislative Council, Andhra Pradesh
- In office 30 March 2017 – 29 March 2023
- Chairman: A. Chakrapani; N. Md. Farooq; Shariff Mohammed Ahmed; Koyye Moshenu Raju
- Leader of the House: N. Chandrababu Naidu; Y. S. Jagan Mohan Reddy
- Constituency: Elected by MLAs

National General Secretary, Telugu Desam Party
- In office 2014 – 14 April 2026 served along with Kinjarapu Ram Mohan Naidu (2014-2026)
- National President: N. Chandrababu Naidu
- Preceded by: Position established
- Succeeded by: Kinjarapu Ram Mohan Naidu; Byreddy Shabari; Kilaru Rajesh

Personal details
- Born: 23 January 1983 (age 43) Hyderabad, Andhra Pradesh, India (now in Telangana, India)
- Party: Telugu Desam Party
- Spouse: Nara Brahmani (m. 2007)
- Children: 1
- Relatives: Nandamuri–Nara family
- Education: BSc (Carnegie) (2004); MBA (Stanford) (2008)
- Occupation: Politician
- Website: www.naralokesh.in

Nara Lokesh (born 23 January 1983) is an Indian politician currently serving as the Minister for Information Technology, Electronics and Communications, Real Time Governance and Human Resources Development in the Government of Andhra Pradesh. He is also the National working President of the Telugu Desam Party (TDP). He is the son of N. Chandrababu Naidu, the Chief Minister of Andhra Pradesh and President of the TDP. He previously served as the Minister for Panchayat Raj and Rural Development, and Information Technology, Electronics and Communications from 2017 to 2019, following his election as a Member of the Legislative Council (MLC) in 2017.

In the 2019 Andhra Pradesh Legislative Assembly election, Lokesh unsuccessfully contested as a Member of the Legislative Assembly (MLA) for the Mangalagiri Assembly constituency. In the 2024 Andhra Pradesh Legislative Assembly election, he was elected as an MLA for Mangalagiri.

== Early life and education ==
Nara Lokesh was born on 23 January 1983 in a Telugu family to N. Chandrababu Naidu and his wife Nara Bhuvaneswari, daughter of N. T. Rama Rao in Hyderabad, Telangana (then part of Andhra Pradesh). He has an MBA from Stanford Graduate School of Business and Bachelor of Science with a specialization in Management Information Systems from Carnegie Mellon University.

== Political career ==
=== Early political career ===
Lokesh started his political career in TDP. In 2014, Lokesh became TDP's general secretary, a member of the Politburo, the highest decision-making body of the party. He managed the party, interacted with party workers and citizens, and helped set the party policies and strategy. He claimed in January 2013 that Rahul Gandhi and the Congress party derived the Direct Benefit Transfer System from a TDP proposal submitted to the central government. He was first elected as the Member of Legislative Council in 2017. Before winning the 2024 Assembly election, he had not won a direct election, though he held several key positions in both the party and the state of Andhra Pradesh. His father N. Chandrababu Naidu, Chief minister of Andhra Pradesh made appointed him as a cabinet minister for IT, Panchayati Raj and Rural development in 2017 through. In 2019, he unsuccessfully contested from the Mangalagiri constituency narrowly losing by a margin of 5,337 votes to Alla Ramakrishna Reddy, a close aide of Y. S. Jagan Mohan Reddy.

Lokesh is credited with successfully managing the TDP party's membership drive that added five million members. The digital technology used by the onboarding team – tablets, live data feeds and a real-time dashboard – was the first such use for enrolling and managing party members in the country.

=== Development and welfare models ===
Lokesh is a trustee of NTR Trust for Healthcare, Education, Skills Enhancement and Disaster Management. Lokesh supervise the trust's disaster response program that functions at times of natural calamities. Each active member of the party will get a personal insurance cover of ₹2 lakh in case of a fatal accident, ₹2 lakh for permanent disability, ₹1 lakh for the partially disabled, and ₹50,000 in case of accidental injuries.

Lokesh-led party online membership drive fetched TDP 53+ lakh members.

=== Padayatra ===
On 27 January 2023, Lokesh started Yuva Galam Padayatra for youth of Andhra Pradesh for 400 days with a road-map to walk 4,000 kms from Kuppam to Ichchapuram.

=== Later political career ===
In 2024 Andhra Pradesh Legislative Assembly election he was elected as MLA of Mangalagiri with a majority of 91,413 votes in the constituency which was never won by Telugu Desam Party for 39 years. This was the third highest majority in this assembly election.

Post elections he was inducted in the Cabinet led by N. Chandrababu Naidu as cabinet minister with departments of Human Resources Development, Information Technology, Electronics and Communication, Real Time Governance.

== Electoral history ==
Election results
Year	Office	Constituency	Party	Votes	%	Opponent	Party	Votes	%	Result	Ref
2019	MLA	Mangalagiri	Telugu Desam Party	103,127	42.14	Alla Ramakrishna Reddy	YSR Congress Party	108,464	45.47	Lost	
2024	MLA	Mangalagiri	Telugu Desam Party	167,710	66.07	Murugudu Lavanya	YSR Congress Party	76,297	30.06	Won	

== Awards and recognition ==
Lokesh won the "Skoch Person of the Year" award in 2018, for his innovative use of technology while resolving issues related to drinking water supply, transparency in governance, and other activities under his Panchayati Raj portfolio.

In May 2018, he won the Business World magazine "Digital Leader of the Year" at the Businessworld Digital India summit in New Delhi. The award recognises the best utilisation of technology in governance. The same year, the Kalam Centre for Livable Planet Earth and Sustainable Development recognised Lokesh's efforts in the successful integration of technology in rural governance and awarded the innovation award to Andhra Pradesh in the Panchayat Raj and Rural Development category.

In September 2018, Lokesh was invited to represent India at the World Economic Forum (WEF) Entrepreneurship Summit and Annual Meeting of World Champions in Tianjin, China. In the following month, he became the only Indian politician to be nominated to the WEF's Network of Global Future Councils (NGFC), an interdisciplinary knowledge group that deliberates on agile governance in terms of emerging technologies and business models.

== Personal life ==
In 2007, Lokesh married Nandamuri Bramhani, elder daughter of actor and politician, Nandamuri Balakrishna. The couple have a son, Nara Devaansh.

Political offices
Preceded by Palle Raghunatha Reddy	Minister for Panchayat Raj, Rural development, Information Technology and Communication; 2 April 2017 – 29 May 2019	Succeeded by Mekapati Goutham Reddy
