= Niranjan Kaushik =

Indian screenwriter and film director

- Born: India
- Education: Mithibai College
- Occupation: Filmmaker
- Notable work: 9 Hours (Disney+Hotstar), Karenjit Kaur (Zee5), Candy (Voot)

Niranjan Kaushik is an Indian born film director, show-runner, content creator / curator, screenwriter and an advertising professional. His works include 9 Hours (Disney+Hotstar), Candy (Voot), Karenjit Kaur (Zee5) and advertising for brands like Lee Cooper, L'Oreal Paris, Mercedes, Volkswagen, HSBC, Asian Paints, Cadbury, Hitachi and Airtel. Besides advertising, he's written extensively for Gentleman. In the past, he has also written for the Bollywood film magazine Star & Style,.

He grew up in Mumbai, went to school, and later to college in the same city, and is a graduate in chemistry from the University of Bombay. He speaks English, Hindi, Marathi and Tamil fluently and is reasonably conversant with Spanish, Telugu and Gujarati.
