= Mangalagiri Assembly constituency =

Constituency of the Andhra Pradesh Legislative Assembly, India

Coordinates: 16.44°N 80.57°E

Mangalagiri
- Constituency No. 87 for the Andhra Pradesh Legislative Assembly
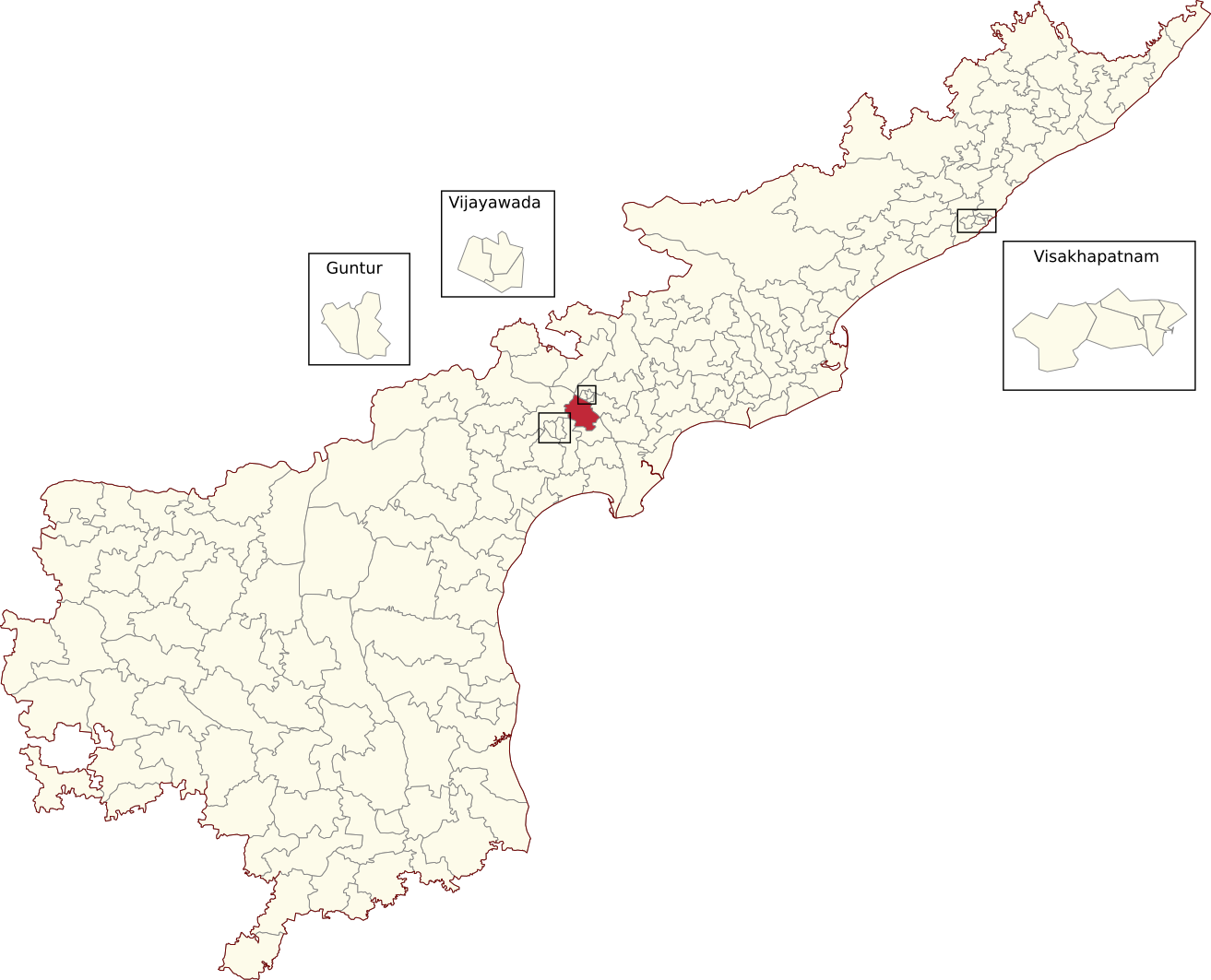
- Location of Mangalagiri Assembly constituency within Andhra Pradesh

Constituency details
- Country: India
- Region: South India
- State: Andhra Pradesh
- District: Guntur
- Lok Sabha constituency: Guntur
- Established: 1951
- Total electors: 2,92,568
- Reservation: None

Member of Legislative Assembly
- 16th Andhra Pradesh Legislative Assembly
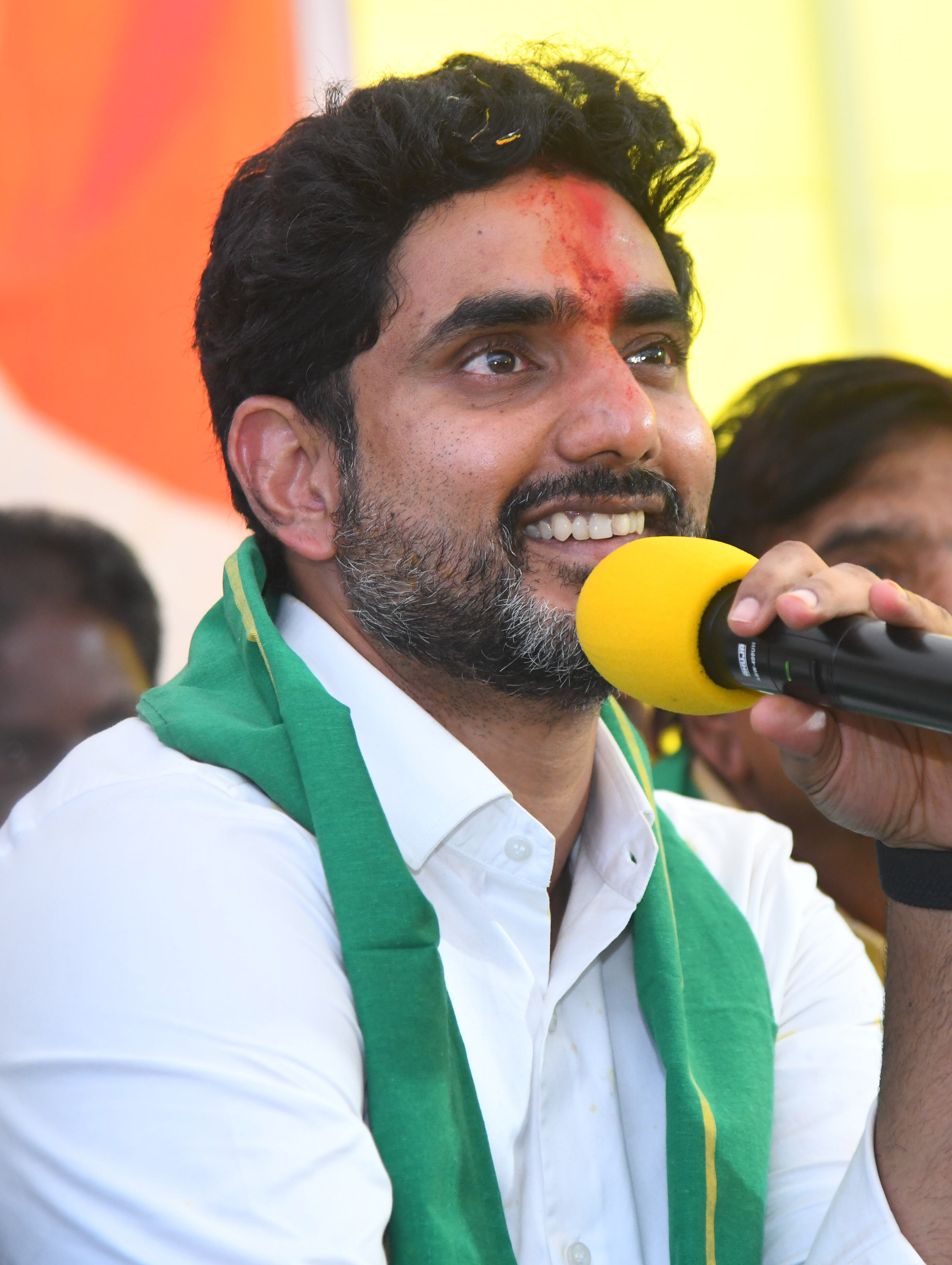
- Incumbent Nara Lokesh
- Party: TDP
- Alliance: NDA
- Elected year: 2024
- Preceded by: Alla Ramakrishna Reddy, YSRCP

Mangalagiri is a constituency in Guntur district of Andhra Pradesh that elects representatives to the Andhra Pradesh Legislative Assembly in India. It is one of the seven assembly segments of Guntur Lok Sabha constituency.

Nara Lokesh is the current MLA of the constituency, having won the 2024 Andhra Pradesh Legislative Assembly election from Telugu Desam Party. As of 2019, there are a total of 2,92,568 electors in the constituency. The constituency was established in 1951, as per the Delimitation Orders (1951).

== Mandals ==
The constituency comprises three mandals and Mangalagiri Tadepalli Municipal Corporation.

Mandal
Mangalagiri
Tadepalli
Duggirala

Mandals in Mangalagiri Assembly Constituency

== Members of the Legislative Assembly ==
| Year | Member | Political party |
|---|---|---|
| 1952 | Darsi Lakshmaiah | Communist Party of India |
| 1955 | Meka Koti Reddy | Indian National Congress |
| 1962 | Vemulapalli Srikrishna | Communist Party of India |
| 1967 | Thulabandla Nageswara Rao | Indian National Congress |
| 1972 | Vemulapalli Srikrishna | Communist Party of India |
| 1978 | Gade Venkata Rattaiah | Janata Party |
| 1983 | M. S. S. Koteswara Rao | Telugu Desam Party |
| 1985 | M. S. S. Koteswara Rao | Telugu Desam Party |
| 1989 | Goli Veeranjaneyulu | Indian National Congress |
| 1994 | Nimmagadda Ramamohan Rao | Communist Party of India |
| 1999 | Murugudu Hanumantha Rao | Indian National Congress |
| 2004 | Murugudu Hanumantha Rao | Indian National Congress |
| 2009 | Kandru Kamala | Indian National Congress |
| 2014 | Alla Ramakrishna Reddy | YSR Congress Party |
| 2019 | Alla Ramakrishna Reddy | YSR Congress Party |
| 2024 | Nara Lokesh | Telugu Desam Party |

== Election results ==
=== 2024 ===
2024 Andhra Pradesh Legislative Assembly election: Mangalagiri
| Party | Candidate | Votes | % | ±% |
|---|---|---|---|---|
| TDP | Nara Lokesh | 167,710 | 66.07 | +23.93 |
| YSRCP | Murugudu Lavanya | 76,297 | 30.06 | −12.08 |
| CPI(M) | Jonna Siva Sankara Rao | 2,629 | 1.04 | −3.06 |
| NOTA | None Of The Above | 890 | 0.35 | |
| Majority | | 91,413 | 36.01 | |
| Turnout | | 2,53,830 | 86.76 | |
| Registered electors | | 2,92,568 | | |
| TDP gain from YSRCP | | Swing | | |

=== 2019 ===
2019 Andhra Pradesh Legislative Assembly election: Mangalagiri
| Party | Candidate | Votes | % | ±% |
|---|---|---|---|---|
| YSRCP | Alla Ramakrishna Reddy | 108,464 | 45.47 | +2.74 |
| TDP | Nara Lokesh | 103,127 | 42.14 | +0.41 |
| CPI | Muppalla Nageswararao | 10,135 | 4.50 | |
| BJP | Jaggarapu Rammohanrao | 1,119 | 0.60 | |
| Majority | | 5,337 | 2.33 | |
| Turnout | | 2,28,469 | 85.45 | |
| YSRCP hold | | Swing | | |

=== 2014 ===
2014 Andhra Pradesh Legislative Assembly election: Mangalagiri
| Party | Candidate | Votes | % | ±% |
|---|---|---|---|---|
| YSRCP | Alla Ramakrishna Reddy | 88,977 | 44.73 | |
| TDP | Ganji Chiranjeevi | 88,965 | 44.73 | |
| CPI(M) | J. V. Raghavulu | 6,627 | 3.73 | |
| CPI | Muppalla Nageswararao | 3,576 | 2.73 | |
| INC | M. Ramakrishna Reddy | 3,028 | 2.09 | |
| Majority | | 12 | 0.00 | |
| Turnout | | 1,98,941 | 89.48 | 8.93 |
| YSRCP gain from INC | | Swing | | |

=== 2009 ===
2009 Andhra Pradesh Legislative Assembly election: Mangalagiri
| Party | Candidate | Votes | % | ±% |
|---|---|---|---|---|
| INC | Kandru Kamala | 52,585 | 32.50 | |
| PRP | Tammisetty Janakidevi | 39,823 | 24.61 | |
| CPI(M) | Donthireddy Srinivasakumari | 25,525 | 15.77 | |
| CPI | Muppalla Nageswararao | 25,158 | 15.54 | |
| BJP | Munagapati Venkateswararao | 2592 | 1.54 | |
| Majority | | 12,762 | 7.88 | |
| Turnout | | 161,798 | 80.55 | |
| INC hold | | Swing | | |

=== 2004 ===
2004 Andhra Pradesh Legislative Assembly election: Mangalagiri
| Party | Candidate | Votes | % | ±% |
|---|---|---|---|---|
| INC | Murugudu Hanumantha Rao | 41,980 | 36.69 | |
| BJP | Tammisetty Janakidevi | 36,599 | 31.99 | |
| CPI(M) | Nimmagadda Rammohan Rao | 33,620 | 29.38 | |
| Margin of victory | | 5,381 | 4.70 | |
| Turnout | | 114,432 | 72.45 | |
| Registered electors | | 157,937 | | |
| INC hold | | Swing | | |

=== 1999 ===
1999 Andhra Pradesh Legislative Assembly election: Mangalagiri
| Party | Candidate | Votes | % | ±% |
|---|---|---|---|---|
| INC | Murugudu Hanumantha Rao | 41,714 | 39.95 | |
| CPI(M) | Nimmagadda Ram Mohan Rao | 29,690 | 28.43 | |
| BJP | Yadlapati Raghunadhababu | 28,782 | 27.56 | |
| NTRTDP(LP) | Mokkapati Lakshmi Narayana | 605 | 0.58 | |
| Margin of victory | | 12,024 | 11.52 | |
| Turnout | | 107,380 | 66.21 | |
| Registered electors | | 162,181 | | |
| INC gain from CPI(M) | | Swing | | |

=== 1994 ===
1994 Andhra Pradesh Legislative Assembly election: Mangalagiri
| Party | Candidate | Votes | % | ±% |
|---|---|---|---|---|
| CPI(M) | Nimmagadda Ram Mohan Rao | 41,447 | 40.99 | |
| INC | Damarla Uma Maheswara Rao | 26,548 | 26.25 | |
| Independent | M. S. S. Koteswara Rao | 16,566 | 16.38 | |
| BSP | Y. Koteswara Rao | 7939 | 7.85 | |
| Independent | Annapureddy Satyanarayana Reddy | 4118 | 4.07 | |
| BJP | Bhimireddy Anji Reddy | 1317 | 1.3 | |
| Margin of victory | | 14,899 | 14.73 | |
| Turnout | | 102,303 | 70.24 | |
| Registered electors | | 145,642 | | |
| CPI(M) gain from INC | | Swing | | |

=== 1989 ===
1989 Andhra Pradesh Legislative Assembly election: Mangalagiri
| Party | Candidate | Votes | % | ±% |
|---|---|---|---|---|
| INC | Goli Veeranjaneyulu | 51,858 | 53.84 | |
| CPI(M) | Simhadri Siva Reddy | 42,294 | 43.91 | |
| Margin of victory | | 9,564 | 9.93 | |
| Turnout | | 98,832 | 71.27 | |
| Registered electors | | 138,671 | | |
| INC gain from TDP | | Swing | | |

=== 1985 ===
1985 Andhra Pradesh Legislative Assembly election: Mangalagiri
| Party | Candidate | Votes | % | ±% |
|---|---|---|---|---|
| TDP | M. S. S. Koteswara Rao | 43,584 | 51.48 | |
| INC | Jamuna (actress) | 39,915 | 47.15 | |
| Independent | Jonnala Anji Reddy | 532 | 0.63 | |
| Margin of victory | | 3,669 | 4.33 | |
| Turnout | | 85,471 | 74.81 | |
| Registered electors | | 114,257 | | |
| TDP hold | | Swing | | |

=== 1983 ===
1983 Andhra Pradesh Legislative Assembly election: Mangalagiri
| Party | Candidate | Votes | % | ±% |
|---|---|---|---|---|
| TDP | M. S. S. Koteswara Rao | 27,561 | 37.75 | |
| INC | Rayapati Srinivas | 24,267 | 33.24 | |
| CPI(M) | Simhadri Siva Reddy | 16,287 | 22.31 | |
| BJP | Tammisetty Ramakrishna | 3881 | 5.32 | |
| Margin of victory | | 3,294 | 4.51 | |
| Turnout | | 73,974 | 70.31 | |
| Registered electors | | 105,209 | | |
| TDP gain from JP | | Swing | | |

=== 1978 ===
1978 Andhra Pradesh Legislative Assembly election: Mangalagiri
| Party | Candidate | Votes | % | ±% |
|---|---|---|---|---|
| JP | Gadde Venkata Rattaiah | 27,032 | 38.72 | |
| INC(I) | Thulabandula Nageswara Rao | 22,999 | 32.95 | |
| CPI | Vemulapalli Srikrishna | 18,749 | 26.86 | |
| Independent | Chaganti Bapireddy | 464 | 0.66 | |
| Margin of victory | | 4,033 | 5.78 | |
| Turnout | | 71,038 | 77.45 | |
| Registered electors | | 91,722 | | |
| JP gain from CPI | | Swing | | |

=== 1972 ===
1972 Andhra Pradesh Legislative Assembly election: Mangalagiri
| Party | Candidate | Votes | % | ±% |
|---|---|---|---|---|
| CPI | Vemulapalli SriKrishna | 18,497 | 28.74 | |
| Independent | Gujjula Gangadhara Reddy | 13,150 | 20.43 | |
| INC | Tulabandhula Nageswara Rao | 13,018 | 20.23 | |
| CPI(M) | Simhadri Siva Reddy | 11,554 | 17.95 | |
| INC(O) | Konda Subba Reddy | 4785 | 7.44 | |
| ABJS | Thammisetty Ramakrishna | 1481 | 2.30 | |
| Margin of victory | | 5,347 | 8.31 | |
| Turnout | | 65,616 | 71.15 | |
| Registered electors | | 92,217 | | |
| CPI gain from INC | | Swing | | |

=== 1967 ===
1967 Andhra Pradesh Legislative Assembly election: Mangalagiri
| Party | Candidate | Votes | % | ±% |
|---|---|---|---|---|
| INC | Thulabandula Nageswara Rao | 18,963 | 33.95 | |
| CPI | Vemulapalli SriKrishna | 17,071 | 30.57 | |
| CPI(M) | Simhadri Venkata Reddy | 16,543 | 29.62 | |
| ABJS | K. K. Rao | 2672 | 4.78 | |
| Margin of victory | | 1,892 | 3.39 | |
| Turnout | | 58,347 | 76.83 | |
| Registered electors | | 75,945 | | |
| INC gain from CPI | | Swing | | |

=== 1962 ===
1962 Andhra Pradesh Legislative Assembly election: Mangalagiri
| Party | Candidate | Votes | % | ±% |
|---|---|---|---|---|
| CPI | Vemulapalli SriKrishna | 23,568 | 45.41 | |
| INC | Tamma Ranga Reddy | 18,417 | 35.49 | |
| SWA | Karumanchi Venkata Subbaiah | 9099 | 17.53 | |
| ABJS | Munagala Naga Bhushanam | 811 | 1.56 | |
| Margin of victory | | 5,151 | 9.93 | |
| Turnout | | 53,819 | 73.36 | |
| Registered electors | | 73,367 | | |
| CPI gain from INC | | Swing | | |

=== 1955 ===
1955 Andhra State Legislative Assembly election: Mangalagiri
| Party | Candidate | Votes | % | ±% |
|---|---|---|---|---|
| INC | Meka Koti Reddy | 24,569 | 56.70 | |
| CPI | Nuthakki Venkata Ranga Rao | 18,764 | 43.30 | |
| Margin of victory | | 5,805 | 13.40 | |
| Turnout | | 43,333 | 74.03 | |
| Registered electors | | 58,534 | | |
| INC gain from CPI | | Swing | | |

=== 1952 ===
1952 Madras State Legislative Assembly election: Mangalagiri
| Party | Candidate | Votes | % | ±% |
|---|---|---|---|---|
| CPI | Darsi Lakshmaiah | 31,217 | 51.35 | |
| KLP | Imgilapati Govinda Rao | 13,992 | 23.02 | |
| INC | Thulabandula Nageswara Rao | 8,594 | 14.14 | 14.14 |
| KMPP | Ratnam | 4,524 | 7.44 | |
| Independent | Ramala Jaya Rao | 1,325 | 2.18 | |
| Independent | Pulla Prakasa Rao | 1,140 | 1.88 | |
| Margin of victory | | 17,225 | 28.33 | |
| Turnout | | 60,792 | 71.16 | |
| Registered electors | | 85,435 | | |
| CPI win (new seat) | | | | |

== See also ==
- List of constituencies of the Andhra Pradesh Legislative Assembly
- Guntur district
