= Niranjan Reddy =

Niranjan Reddy may refer to:

- Singireddy Niranjan Reddy (born 1958), Indian politician, and a minister from Telangana
- S. Niranjan Reddy (born 1970), Indian lawyer, film producer and politician, and a Member of Parliament in Rajya Sabha from Andhra Pradesh
