= Kandru Kamala =

Indian politician

Kandru Kamala (born 10 March 1967) is an Indian politician from Andhra Pradesh. She was a Member of the Legislative Assembly in Andhra Pradesh representing the Indian National Congress from Mangalagiri Assembly constituency in Guntur district.

== Early life ==
Kamala is from Mangalagiri. She is from Padmasali, the weaving community. She married Siva Nagendra Rao. Her daughter Murugudu Lavanya contested on YSR Congress ticket, but lost against Nara Lokesh in the 2023 Andhra Pradesh Legislative Assembly election.

== Career ==
Kamala won the 2009 Andhra Pradesh Legislative Assembly election from Mangalagiri Assembly constituency representing the Indian National Congress. She polled 52,585 votes and defeated her nearest rival, Tammisetty Janaki Devi of Praja Rajyam Party, by a margin of 12,762 votes.

In March 2019, she joined YSR Congress Party ahead of the assembly elections. After staying away from politics for some time, she expressed here intention to re-enter active politics in December 2023 before the assembly election.
