= Niranjan Parajuli =

Nepali chemist

- निरञ्जन पराजुली
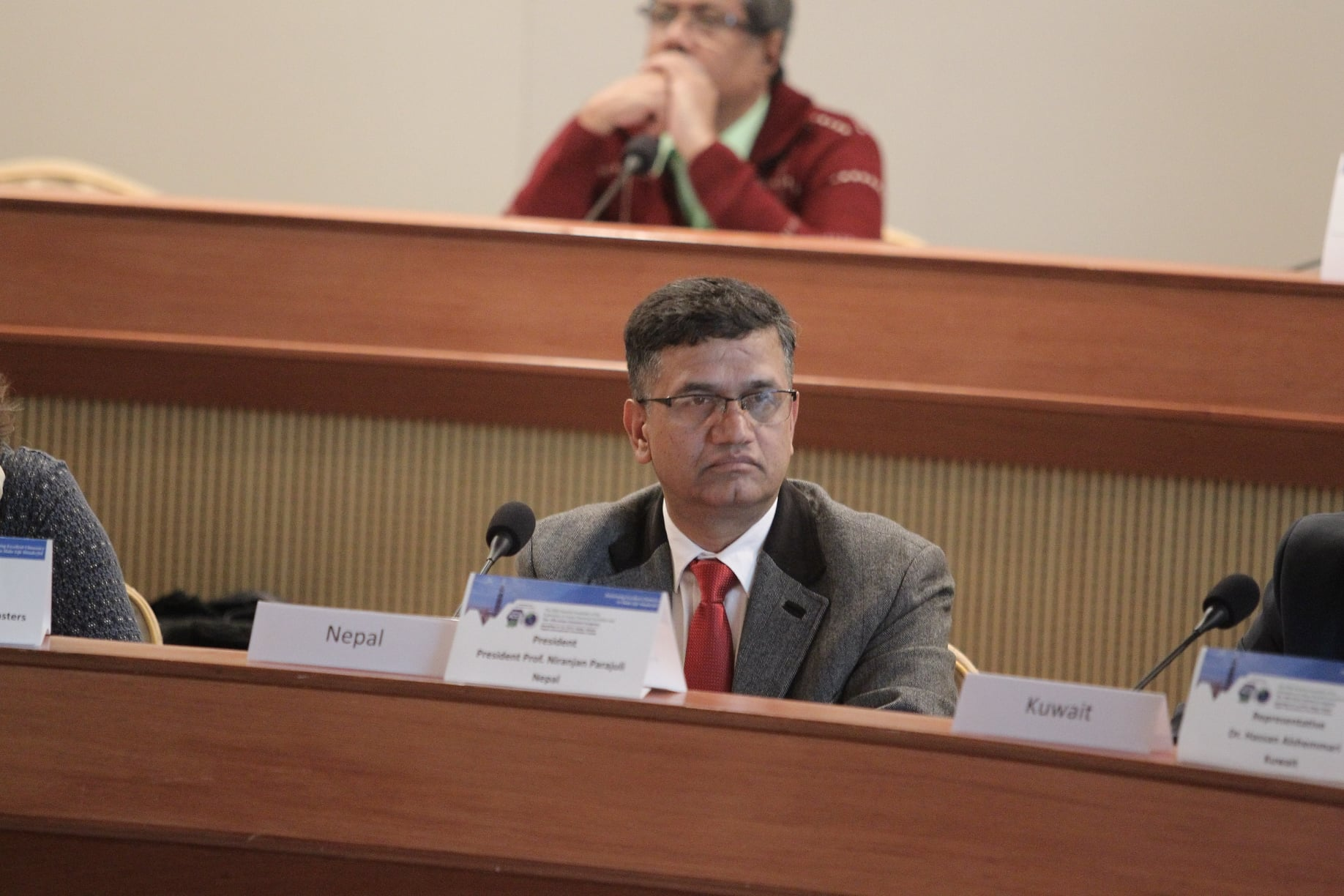
- Parajuli at the Asian Chemical Congress in 2019 as the President of Nepal Chemical Society
- Education: Sun Moon University (Ph.D.) Tribhuvan University (B.Sc., M.Sc.)
- Awards: Mahendra Vidya Bhushan A Mahendra Vidya Bhushan B Science & Technology Youth Award Brain Pool Fellowship Distinguished Professor Award
- Scientific career
- Fields: Organic Chemistry, Pharmaceutical Chemistry, Biochemistry, Biotechnology, Combinatorial Chemistry
- Workplaces: Tribhuvan University North Carolina State University; Ewha Woman's University Kathmandu University

Niranjan Parajuli (Nepali: निरञ्जन पराजुली) is a Nepali chemist, biochemist, and biotechnologist. He served as president of the Nepal Chemical Society from 2019 to 2021, and was a professor of chemistry at Tribhuvan University. From March 2025 to March 2026, he worked as a research scientist at North Carolina Agricultural and Technical State University, USA. His research focuses on microbial biotechnology, natural products, protein engineering and computational chemistry.

== Research ==
Parajuli’s research focuses on microbial biotechnology, natural product discovery, protein engineering, and computational chemistry. His work includes genome mining, metabolomics and in silico studies of bioactive compounds. He has published studies on antibiotic biosynthesis, secondary metabolites from plants and microorganisms, and therapeutic compound modeling.

== Awards and recognition ==
- Mahendra Vidya Bhushan A and B, Government of Nepal
- Science & Technology Youth Award, Nepal Academy of Science and Technology
- Brain Pool Fellowship, National Research Foundation of Korea
- Distinguished Professor Award, Biotechnology Society of Nepal
- Listed among the world's top 2% of scientists in 2025 by Stanford University–Elsevier

== Personal life ==
Parajuli is married to journalist Madhabi Bhatta and has two sons.

== Selected publications ==
1. Park, J.W., Hong, J.S.J., Parajuli, N., et al. “Genetic dissection of the biosynthetic route to gentamicin A2 by heterologous expression of its minimal gene set.” Proceedings of the National Academy of Sciences, 105, 8399–8404 (2008).
2. Parajuli, N., Williams, G.J. “A high-throughput screen for directed evolution of aminocoumarin amide synthetases.” Analytical Biochemistry, 419, 61–66 (2011).
3. Upadhyaya, S.R., Bashyal, J., Raut, B.K., Parajuli, N. “In silico study of therapeutic potential of natural polyphenol derivatives targeting pancreatic lipase.” Discover Chemistry, 2, 189 (2025).
4. Joshi, S., Huo, C., Budhathoki, R., Gurung, A., Bhattarai, S., Sharma, K.R., Kim, K.H., Parajuli, N. “HPLC-ESI-HRMS/MS-Based Metabolite Profiling and Bioactivity Assessment of Catharanthus roseus.” Plants, 14, 2395 (2025).
