= Chintalapalle, Razole Mandal =

Chintalapalle
- village
- Interactive map of Chintalapalle
- Location in Andhra Pradesh, India Chintalapalle (India)
- Coordinates: 16.4478°N 81.8617°E
- Country: India
- State: Andhra Pradesh
- District: Dr. B.R. Ambedkar Konaseema

Area
  - Total: 7 km^{2} (2.7 sq mi)

Population (2011)
  - Total: 6,320
  - Density: 860/km^{2} (2,200/sq mi)

Languages
  - Official: Telugu
- Time zone: UTC+5:30 (IST)
- Postal code: 533 446

Chintalapalle is a village in Razole Mandal, Dr. B.R. Ambedkar Konaseema district in the state of Andhra Pradesh in India.

== Geography ==
Chintalapalle is located at 16.4478°N 81.8617°E.

== Demographics ==
As of 2011 India census, Chintalapalle had a population of 6320, out of which 3161 were male and 3159 were female. The population of children below 6 years of age was 8%. The literacy rate of the village was 81%.
