= Podalada =

- village
- Interactive map of Podalada
- Location in Andhra Pradesh, India Podalada (India)
- Coordinates: 16.4881°N 81.8636°E
- Country: India
- State: Andhra Pradesh
- District: Dr. B.R. Ambedkar Konaseema

Area
  - Total: 1 km^{2} (0.39 sq mi)

Population (2011)
  - Total: 2,815
  - Density: 2,117/km^{2} (5,480/sq mi)

Languages
  - Official: Telugu
- Time zone: UTC+5:30 (IST)
- Postal code: 533 446

Podalada is a village in Razole Mandal, Dr. B.R. Ambedkar Konaseema district in the state of Andhra Pradesh in India.

== Geography ==
Podalada is located at 16.4881°N 81.8636°E.

== Demographics ==
As of 2011 India census, Podalada had a population of 2815, out of which 1406 were male and 1409 were female. The population of children below 6 years of age was 10%. The literacy rate of the village was 83%.
