= Chintalapalle =

- Revenue Village
- Interactive map of Chintalapalle
- Location in Andhra Pradesh, India Chintalapalle (India)
- Coordinates: 15.7361°N 78.2861°E
- Country: India
- State: Andhra Pradesh
- District: Nandyal
- Mandal: Midthuru

Population (2011)
  - Total: 2,344

Languages
  - Official: Telugu
- Time zone: UTC+5:30 (IST)
- Postal code: 518405
- Vehicle registration: AP

Chintalapalle is a village in Midthuru mandal, located in Nandyal district of the Indian state of Andhra Pradesh.
