= Minhaz Merchant =

Indian author and publisher

Minhaz Merchant is an editor, author and publisher. He founded the pioneering media firm Sterling Newspapers Pvt. Ltd. which was later acquired by the Indian Express Group.

== Career ==
Minhaz through his media startups, has founded and launched 10 specialised magazines – Gentleman, GFQ, TV and Video World, Technocrat, Business Computer, Mega City, Business Barons, Banking & Finance, élan and Innovate. He has written seven books and is the biographer of former Prime Minister Rajiv Gandhi, the late industrialist Aditya Birla and the chairman of Larsen & Toubro, A.M. Naik.

Minhaz has appeared on numerous television news programmes on India Today TV, TimesNow and NDTV. His YouTube channel features a current affairs show Head-On with Minhaz Merchant for some time. His last video on YouTube is 3 year old

Apart from being a media entrepreneur, Minhaz is a widely published newspaper columnist and television commentator. He is the author of The New Clash of Civilizations: How the Contest Between America, China, India and Islam will Shape Our Century.

== Education ==
Minhaz Merchant studied in Cathedral and John Connon School, Mumbai, West Buckland School, Devon, England, and St. Xaviers College, Bombay University. He holds an honours degree in physics and mathematics and is the recipient of the Lady Jeejeebhoy scholarship for physics.

== Personal ==
Minhaz was born in Bhavnagar, Gujarat, to a prominent industrialist Muslim family. His father, D.M. Merchant, was one of India’s first business graduates from the University of California, Berkeley, in 1950. Minhaz is married to the artist Kahini Merchant and has two children Suhail and Tehzeeb.
