= Tirukkural translations =

Non-Tamil versions of an ethics treatise

Tirukkural, also known as the Kural, an ancient Indian treatise on the ethics and morality of the commoner, is one of the most widely translated non-religious works in the world. Authored by the ancient Tamil poet-philosopher Thiruvalluvar, the work has been translated into 64 languages, with a total more than 350 individual translations, including 143 different renderings in the English language alone.

== Beginning of translations ==
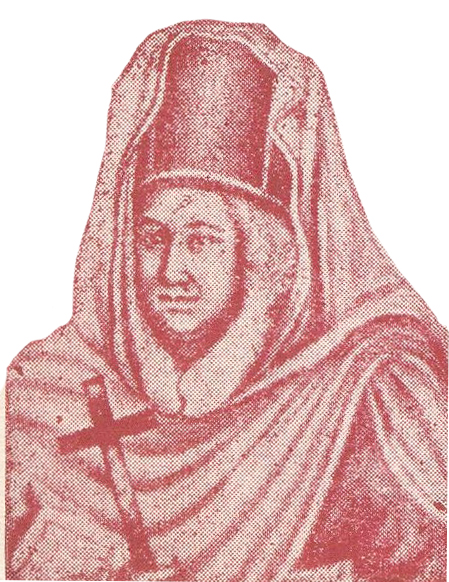
Beschi, the earliest known translator of the Kural text

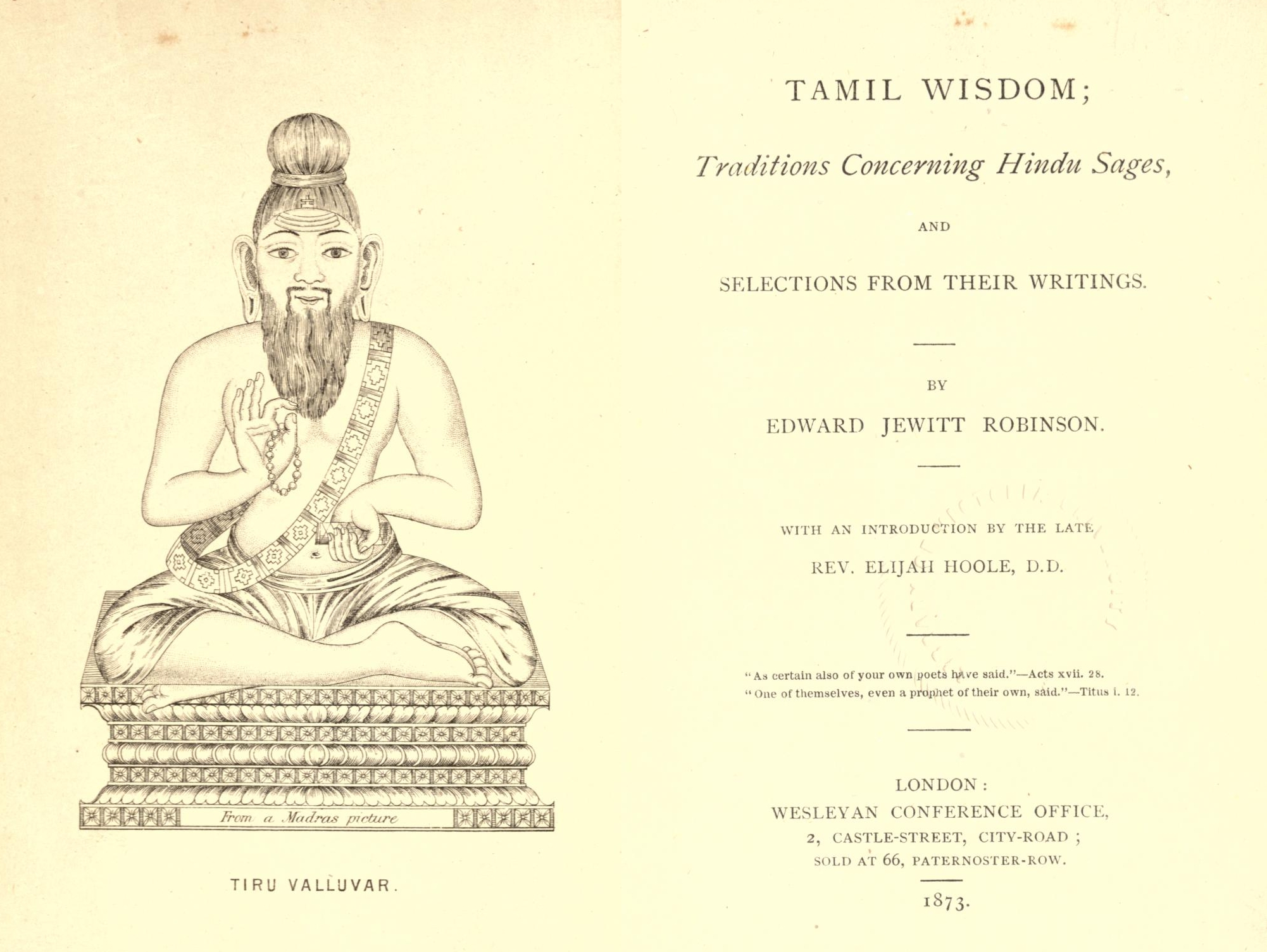
Tamil Wisdom, by Edward Jewitt Robinson, 1873

The Kural text, considered to have been written in the 1st century BCE, remained unknown to the outside world for close to one and a half millennia. The first translation of the Kural text appeared in Malayalam in 1595 CE under the title Tirukkural Bhasha by an unknown author. It was a prose rendering of the entire Kural, written closely to the spoken Malayalam of that time. However, again, this unpublished manuscript remained obscure until it was first reported by the Annual Report of the Cochin Archeological Department for the year 1933–34. It took another three centuries before the next Malayalam translation was made in 1863 by Perunazhi Krishna Vaidhyan.

The Kural text has enjoyed a universal appeal right from antiquity owing to its secular and non-denominational nature that it suited the sensibilities of all. The universality is such that, despite its having been written in the pre-Christian era, almost every religious group in India and across the world, including Christianity, has claimed the work for itself. Owing to its ethical content, the Kural remained one of the most admired ancient Indian works among the Christian missionaries of the 16th and 17th centuries, who arrived in India during the colonial era and found the Kural text containing many more ideals in addition to those that are similar to their own Christian ideals. This marked the beginning of wider translations of the Kural text.

In 1730, Constantius Joseph Beschi rendered the Kural text into Latin, introducing the work to the Europeans for the first time. However, only the first two books of the Kural text, namely, virtue and wealth, were translated by Beschi, who considered translating the book on love inappropriate for a Christian missionary. Around 1767, an unknown author made the first French translation, which went unnoticed. The Danish Missionary August Friedrich Caemmerer translated it into German in 1803. The first available French version, however, was the one made in 1848 by E. S. Ariel. Here again, only parts of the work was translated. In 1856, Karl Graul translated the Kural into German, claiming that the Kural is closer to the Christian preaching and offers a model of Tamil worldview. The German version was published both at London and Leipzig. In 1865, his Latin translation of the Kural text, along with commentaries in Simple Tamil, was posthumously published.

The first English translation ever was attempted by N. E. Kindersley in 1794 when he translated select couplets of the Kural. This was followed by another incomplete attempt by Francis Whyte Ellis in 1812, who translated only 120 couplets—69 in verse and 51 in prose. William Henry Drew translated the first two parts in prose in 1840 and 1852, respectively. Along with Drew's English prose translation, it contained the original Tamil text, the Tamil commentary by Parimelalhagar and Ramanuja Kavirayar's amplification of the commentary. Drew, however, translated only 630 couplets. The remaining portions were translated by John Lazarus, a native missionary, thus providing the first complete English translation. In 1886, George Uglow Pope published the first complete English translation in verse by a single author, which brought the Kural text to a wide audience of the western world.

By the turn of the twenty-first century, the Kural had already been translated to more than 37 world languages, with at least 24 complete translations in English language alone, by both native and non-native scholars. By 2014, the Kural had been translated to more than 42 languages, with 57 versions available in English. Along with the Bible and the Quran, the Kural remains one of the most translated works in the world. In October 2021, the Central Institute of Classical Tamil announced its translating the Kural text into 102 world languages.

== Criticisms on translations ==
The couplets of the Kural are inherently complex by virtue of their dense meaning within their terse structure. Thus, no translation can perfectly reflect the true nature of any given couplet of the Kural unless read and understood in its original Tamil form. Added to this inherent difficulty is the attempt by some scholars to either read their own ideas into the Kural couplets or deliberately misinterpret the message to make it conform to their preconceived notions, a problem of Hermeneutics. The Latin translation by Father Beshi, for instance, contains several such mistranslations noticed by modern scholars. According to V. Ramasamy, "Beschi is purposely distorting the message of the original when he renders பிறவாழி as 'the sea of miserable life' and the phrase பிறவிப்பெருங்கடல் as 'sea of this birth' which has been translated by others as 'the sea of many births'. Beschi means thus 'those who swim the vast sea of miseries'. The concept of rebirth or many births for the same soul is contrary to Christian principle and belief". In August 2022, the governor of Tamil Nadu, R. N. Ravi, criticized Anglican Christian missionary G. U. Pope for "translating with the colonial objective to 'trivialise' the spiritual wisdom of India," resulting in a "de-spiritualised version" of the Kural text.

== List of translations ==
Below is a list of translations of the Kural:

S.No.	Language	Translator(s)	Title of the Translation	Place of Publication	Year	Coverage and Form	Notes	Translation for comparison: Kural (verse) 251 (Chapter 26:1)
1	Arabic	Muhammad Yousuf Kokan	Al-Abiayaatul Muqaddisa (Sacred Verses)	(Hanifa House Printers and Publishers)	1976–1980	Complete	Translated from an English translation.	كيف يكون احد رؤوفا ورحيما إن يأكل الحيوانات لا زدياد شحمه ودسمه فى جثـتـه وجسمه
1	Arabic	Basheer Ahmed Jamali		Chennai (Central Institute of Classical Tamil)	2014	Complete		
1	Arabic	Amar Hasan	Thirukkural	Beirut, Lebanon (Al Farabi Publications)	2015	Complete		
1	Arabic	Mahmood Fat-hi Sa’d Khalifa		Egypt				
1	Arabic	A. Jahir Hussain	Thirukkural	Chennai (International Institute of Tamil Studies)	2020	Complete–Verse	Translated from Tamil original.	
1	Arabic	Basheer Ahmad	Tirukkur̲aḷ – Translations into Arabic	Chennai (CICT)	2022	Complete	477 pages; ISBN: 978-93-81744-71-0	
1	Arabic	K. M. A. Ahamed Zubair	Al- Abyath Al- Baariza: Thirukkural	London (Shams Publishing Inc.)	2024	Complete	ISBN: 978-620-3-91353-8	
2	Assamese	Malini Goswami	Thirukural	Guwahati (Assam Publication Board)	2012	Complete		
2	Assamese	B. Vijayakumar	Thirukkural in Assamese	Chennai (Central Institute of Classical Tamil)	2023	Complete	ISBN: 978-81-19249-32-9; Released by Indian Prime Minister Narendra Modi in December 2023	
3	Awadhi	Ramlakhan Prajapati Pratagarhi	Thirukkural in Awadhi	Chennai (Central Institute of Classical Tamil)	2023	Complete	Released by Indian Prime Minister Narendra Modi in December 2023; ISBN: 978-81-19249-30-5	
4	Badaga	C. P. Krishniah	Thirukkural in Badaga	Chennai (Central Institute of Classical Tamil)	2022	Complete	440 pages; ISBN: 978-93-81744-78-9	
5	Bengali	Nalini Mohan Sanyal	Thirukkural	Calcutta	1939	Prose		
5	Bengali	E. C. Sastri	Thirukkural	Calcutta	1974	Prose		
5	Bengali	N. Ramanuja Das Khardah	Thirukkural		1993	Prose		
5	Bengali	S. Krishnamoorthy	Tirukkural (Ancient Tamil Poetry)	Calcutta (Sahityika)	2001	Complete—Verse	Reprinted in 2014 by Sahitya Akademi; 148 pages. ISBN 978-81-260-4719-2	
6	Bhojpuri	Harish Chandra Mishra	Thirukkural in Bhojpuri	Chennai (Central Institute of Classical Tamil)	2023	Complete	ISBN: 978-81-260-4719-2; ISBN: 978-81-19249-36-7; Released by Indian Prime Minister Narendra Modi in December 2023	
7	Bodo	Rupali Swarglary and B. Vijayakumar	Tirukkural	Chennai (Central Institute of Classical Tamil)	2023	Complete	ISBN: 978-81-19249-41-1	
8	Burmese	U. Myo Thant	Thirukkural (Nitimala of Tamil men: The Bible of Syracuse)	Rangoon (Kanbe Nattukottai Chettiyar Education Trust)	1964	Complete—Prose	193 pages	
8	Burmese	Parimala Devi Thinagara Suwami	Thirukkural Burmese Translation	Chennai (Central Institute of Classical Tamil)	2023	Complete	ISBN: 978-81-19249-27-5	
9	Chinese	Ch'eng Xi	Gula Zhenyan (古臘箴言)	Hong Kong (Hong Kong University Press: Xianggang Daxue Chubanshe)	1967		166 pages	如何真正实践慈悲谁吃动物肉养肥自己的血肉?
9	Chinese	Yu Hsi	Thirukkural	Taipei, Taiwan (Poem Culture Corp.)	2010	Complete	ISBN: 978-986-8677-5-0; 267 pages; Book released by former President of India, A. P. J. Abdul Kalam Reprinted in India in 2014 by the Department of Tamil Development and Culture	以他者的脂肪養胖自己的人， 怎可能是善良的呢？
10	Creole	Rama Valayden		Port Louis, Mauritius (Calson Printing Ltd)	2007		Translated only Books I and II; ISBN 978-99903-66-21-1	
10	Creole	K. Karupudayyan and Ramen			2018	Partial	Translated only Book III	Not translated
10	Creole	Uma Allaghery	Thirukkural (Kreol [Morisien] Translation)	Chennai (Central Institute of Classical Tamil)	2023	Complete	ISBN: 978-81-19249-33-6	
11	Czech	Kamil V. Zvelebil	Thirukural (Selections)	Prague	1952–1954	Selections	Translated select couplets that appeared in Novy Orient, a Czech journal, during 1952–54.	
12	Danish	Marianne Steen Isak	Thirukural	(Tamil Danish Socio-Literary Federation)	2021	Complete		
12	Danish	Anjalay Ratnam, Keerthana Amirthalingam, Roshana-Jasmin Simon, and Sumeka Srikaran	Tirukkural (Danish)	Chennai (Central Institute of Classical Tamil)	2023	Complete	ISBN: 978-81-19249-28-2	
13	Dogri	Vineet Budki	Tirukkur̲aḷ – Translations into Dogri	Chennai (CICT)	2023	Complete	ISBN: 978-81-19249-37-4	
14	Dutch	D. Kat	Thirukural (Selections)	Netherlands	1964	Selections		
15	English	Nathaniel Edward Kindersley	Specimens of Hindoo Literature	London (W. Bulmer and Co.)	1794	Selections—Verse	Made the first ever translation of the Kural text into English in a chapter titled 'Extracts from the Teroo-Vaulaver Kuddul, or, The Ocean of Wisdom' in his book Specimens of Hindoo Literature	Not translated.
15	English	Francis Whyte Ellis	Thirukural on Virtue (in verse) with Commentary	Madras	1812 (reprint 1955)	Selections—Mixed	Incomplete translation—only 120 couplets translated, 69 in verse and 51 in prose	Not translated
15	English	William Henry Drew	The Cural of Thiruvalluvar with Commentary of Parimelazhakar	Madurai (American Mission Press)	1840	Partial—Prose	Translated only the first 630 couplets	How can he be possessed of kindness, who, to increase his own flesh, eats the flesh of other (creatures)?
15	English	Charles E. Gover	Odes from the Kural (Folksongs of South India)	Madras (Higginbothams)	1872	Selections–Verse	Reprinted in 1981 by Gian Publications, Delhi	
15	English	Edward Jewitt Robinson	Tamil Wisdom	London (Paternoster Row)	1873	Partial—Verse	Translated only Books I and II (1080 couplets)	What graciousness by those is shown Who feed with others' flesh their own?
15	English	William Henry Drew, and John Lazarus	Thirukural (in verses)	Madras	1885	Partial—Prose	Lazarus revised Drew's work and translated the remaining portion (couplets 631 to 1330) in prose as done by Drew, thus making the incomplete work of Drew a complete one.	How can he be possessed of kindness, who, to increase his own flesh, eats the flesh of other (creatures)?
15	English	George Uglow Pope	A Collection of the English Translation of Thirukural	Madras	1886	Complete—Verse	First complete translation in English by a single author	How can the wont of 'kindly grace' to him be known, Who other creatures' flesh consumes to feed his own?
15	English	T. Thirunavukarasu	Kural—A Selection of 366 Verses (A Gem for Each Day)	Madras (SPCK Press)	1915	Selections—Prose		
15	English	V. V. S. Aiyar	Kural: Maxims of Thiruvalluvar	Madras (Amudha Nilayam)	1916	Complete–Prose		How can he feel pity, who eateth other flesh to fatten his own?
15	English	T. P. Meenakshisundaram			1919		Published the 1904 work of K. Vadivelu Chettiar with English renderings. Republished in 1972–1980 in Madurai as Kural in English with Tamil Text and Parimelazhakar Commentary (3 parts). Recent edition published in 2015 in 2 volumes.	
15	English	S. Sabaratna Mudaliyar	Kural	Madras	1920			
15	English	G. Vanmikanathan	The Tirukkural: A unique guide to moral, material and spiritual prosperity	Madras (Rathina Nayakkar & Sons); Tiruchirappalli (The Tirukural Prachar Sangh)	1924	Complete—		
15	English	A. Madhaviah	Kural in English with Commentary in Tamil	Madras (Panchamirtham Press)	1925	Selections—Verse		
15	English	T. V. Parameswaran Aiyar	108 Gems from the Sacred Kural	Kottayam (Jagadamba Vidhya Vihar)	1928	Selections		
15	English	Unknown	Jeevakarunya Thirukkural Selections	Karaikkudi (Kumaran Co. Publishers)	1928	Selections		
15	English	S. Somasundara Bharathiyar	Tiruvalluvar: English translation in Tamil lectures	Madurai (Madurai Tamil Sangam)	1929		Published again in 1966 by Navalar Somasundara Bharatiyar Trust, Chennai	
15	English	H. A. Popley	The Sacred Kural (Selections in verses)	Calcutta (The Heritage of India Press)	1931	Selections—Verse	Another edition published by YMCA Publishing House	How can kindliness rule that man, Who eateth other flesh to increase his own?
15	English	A. Ranganatha Muthaliar	Thirukural Moolamum Uraiyum with English Translation	Madras (Suvarna Vilas)	1933		365 pages	
15	English	C. Rajagopalachari	Kural, the Great Book of Thiruvalluvar	Madras	1935	Partial—Prose	Selections of 355 couplets; second edition published in 1965 by Bharatiya Vidhya Bhavan	
15	English	M. S. Purnalingam Pillai	The Kural in English	Tirunelveli (Sri Kanthimathi Vilasam Press)	1942	Complete–Prose		How can a man grace who eats the meat of other animal to fatten himself?
15	English	S. M. Michael	The Sacred Aphorisms of Thiruvalluvar (in verse)	Nagarcoil	1946	Complete—Verse		Who eats flesh other his own to expand, How can he grace command?
15	English	V. R. Ramachandra Dikshitar	Thirukural in English with Roman Translation	Madras	1949	Complete—Prose		He who fattens on the flesh of animals, can he ever understand the rule of love?
15	English	M. R. Rajagopala Aiyangar	Tirukkural	Kumbakonam (S. Viswanathan and Co.)	1950	Complete–Prose		
15	English	P. Raja	Thirukural (in verses)	Kumbakonam	1950	—Verse		
15	English	A. Chakravarti	Thirukural in English with Commentary	Madras (Diocesan Press, Vepery)	1953	Complete—Prose	648 pages	How can a person cultivate the habit of universal benevolence if he for the purpose of fattening his own flesh (body) eats flesh of other animals?
15	English	I. D. Thangaswami	Thirukural: Virtue and Wealth (Selections in Verse)	Madras (K. Venkatesan, The Progressive Printers)	1954	Selections—Verse	Translated only 366 verses from Books I and II.	
15	English	Issac T. Thangaiya	Thirukkural in English with Parimelazhakar Commentary	Madras	1955			
15	English	K. M. Balasubramaniam	Thirukural of Thiruvalluvar	Madras (Manali Lakshmana Mudaliar's Specific Endowments)	1962	Complete—Verse	Reprinted in 2012 by Palaniappa Brothers, Chennai and Shivalayam, Chennai	How can the one who eats a flesh to have his own flesh swell Possess a melting heart in which compassion could e'er dwell?
15	English	T. Muthuswamy	Thirukkural, the Gospel of Mankind	Madurai (Vivekananda Press)	1965	Partial—Prose		
15	English	V. Chinnarajan	The Kural Gems	Udumalpet (Gopalaratna Gupta)	1967	Selections–Verse		
15	English	C. R. Soundararajan			1968	Complete–Prose		
15	English	Emmons E. White	The Wisdom of India	New York City (The Peter Pauper Press)	1968	Selections–Verse	Published as The Wisdom of the Tamil People in 1976	
15	English	Yogi Suddanantha Bharathi	Thirukural with English Couplets	Madras (SISSWP Society)	1968	Complete—Verse		What graciousness can one command Who feeds his flesh by flesh gourmand?
15	English	G. Vanmikanathan	The Thirukural—A Unique Guide to Moral, Material and Spiritual Prosperity	Trichy	1969	Complete—Prose		How will he exercise charity, who eats the flesh of another (creature) to fatten his own flesh?
15	English	Kasturi Srinivasan	Thirukural: An Ancient Tamil Classic (in couplets)	Bombay (Bharatiya Vidhya Bhavan)	1969	Complete—Verse		To feed his flesh, who flesh consumes What kindly grace, such man presumes?
15	English	A. Gajapathy Nayagar	The Rosary of Gems of Thirukkural	Madras (The Tamilar Peravai)	1969	Selections		
15	English	Yogi Suddanantha Bharathi	Thirukural Couplets with Clear Prose Rendering	Madras	1970	Complete—Prose		
15	English	T. N. S. Ragavachari	Teachings of Tiruvalluvar's Kural	Madras (Health, June 1966 – October 1971)	1971	Complete–Prose	Reprinted in 1982	
15	English	S. R. V. Vasu	Voice of Valluvar: A Modern Commentary of the Kural	Madras (Thayakam)	1972	Selection	Selection of about 200 couplets; 90 pages	
15	English	E. V. Singan	Tirukkural: The Sayings of Tiruvalluvar	Singapore (EVS Enterprises)	1975	Complete–Prose	Reprinted in 1982	
15	English	S. N. Sriramadesikan	Tirukkural in Sanskrit, with Tamil and English Translations	Madras (Gangai Puthaka Nilayam)(Lalitha Publications)	1978	Complete–Prose	Reprinted in 1991, 1994, and 2006	How can a person be held to be compassionate when he slays animals and eat their flesh, for fattening his own body?
15	English	S. Maharajan	Tiruvalluvar	New Delhi (Sahitya Akademi)	1979	Verse—Selections	Translated select couplets from all the three books of the Kural text. Second edition was published in 1982.	How can he be possessed of grace, who, to swell his own flesh, eats the flesh of others!
15	English	Satguru Sivaya Subramuniya Swami	Thirukural/Weavers Wisdom	New Delhi (Abhinav Publications)/(Himalayan Academy Publications)	1979	Partial—Verse	Translated only Books I and II; published again in 2000	How can he practice true compassion Who eats the flesh of an animal to fatten his own flesh?
15	English	K. C. Kamaliah	Sacred Kural: The Kindly Light	Trinelvely (South India Saiva Siddhanta Works Publishing Society)	1981			
15	English	S. M. Diaz	Aphorisms of Valluvar: Commentary and Comparative Study	Madras: International Society for the Investigation of Ancient Civilizations	1982	Complete—Verse		It is inconsistent with the way of living compassion, To fatten oneself on the flesh of a fellow-creature.
15	English	S. Jagathratchagan	Thirukkural: English Rendering	Madras (Apollo Publications)	1985	Complete	291 pages	
15	English	K. Chokkalingam	Thirukkural: Aratthuppaal	Jaffna (Sri Subramaniya Puthaka Salai)	1985	Partial	Translated only Book I	
15	English	C. Rajasingham	Thirukkural: The Daylight of the Psych	Madras (International Institute of Tamil Studies)	1987	Partial	Translated the first 9 chapters	
15	English	P. S. Sundaram	Tiruvalluvar: The Kural	New Delhi (Penguin Books India Limited)	1987	Complete–Verse	Reprinted in 1989, 1991, 1992, and 2000 by International Tamil Language Foundation, Illinois	How can he be kindly Who fattens himself on others' fat?
15	English	T. S. Ramalingam Pillai	Thirukkural with English Translation	Trinelvely (Saiva Siddhanta Works Publishing)	1987			
15	English	K. N. Subramanyan	Tiruvalluvar and His Tirukkural	(Bharatya Gnanpith)	1987	Selections		
15	English	K. R. Srinivasa Iyengar	Tirukkural: Light of the Righteous Life	Calcutta (M. P. Birla Foundation)	1988	Complete–Verse		
15	English	M. Thiraviyam	Tirukkural	Madras (Asian Educational Services)	1988	Selections	Published again in 1992 as 108 Tirukkural Couplets in English by Vanathi Padippakam, Madras	
15	English	K. Chellappan	Kural—Portraits: Dr. Kalaignar M. Karunanidhi's Kuralovium, a Translation from Tamil by K. Chellappan	Annamalai Nagar: Annamalai University	1989			
15	English	Chidambaran Ilankumaranar	Thirukkural English Translation	Madurai	1990			
15	English	A. Pandurangan	Tirukkural—Arattuppal	Thiruvannamalai (Tilakavathi Publications)	1990			
15	English	M. Swaminathan	Tirukkural—English Translation	Mayiladuthurai (Ganapathi Printers)	1991			
15	English	Norman Cutler	A Gift of Tamil: Translations of Tamil Literature	New Delhi (Manohar and American Institute of Indian Studies)	1992	Selections	Edited by Paula Richman	
15	English	T. R. Kallapiran	Thirukkural (Words of Eternal Wisdom)	Madras (Baba Pathippagam, Tondiarpet)	1995	Complete	266+40 pages	
15	English	D. V. G. Ramarathinam	Tirukkural: English Translations	(Thiyaga Durgam)	1995	Complete–Prose		
15	English	G. J. B. Christopher	A Metrical Translation of Tirukkural (Part One: Righteousness)	Tiruchirappalli (Primerose Home)	1997	Partial	Translated only Book I; 80 pages	
15	English	Swamiji Iraianban	Ambrosia of Thirukkural	New Delhi (Abhinav Publications)	1997	Complete–Prose		A man cannot feel pity in his heart for others, when they eat other creatures' flesh in order to make their own bodies fat.
15	English	G. N. Das	Readings from Thirukkural	New Delhi (Abhinav Publications)	1997	Select–Verse		Whoever eats other animal's flesh To fatten himself on it How can any hope to find in him, Merciful quality, however slight?
15	English	J. Narayanasamy	Tirukkural	Coimbatore (Gemini Art Printers)	1998	Complete–Mixed	More in prose than in verse. Reprinted in 1999.	Hardly any mercy is left in the minds of those who build their bodies with the flesh of other beings.
15	English	K. Kaliaperumal	Wonders of Tirukkural	Thanjavur (Jayam Publications)	1999	Complete–Verse	364 pages	
15	English	C. R. Acharya	Maxims of Truth (Commentary on Thirukkural)	Madras (Super Power Press)	1999		964 pages	
15	English	K. C. Agamudai Nambi	Thirukkural	Madurai (Author)	1999		352 pages	
15	English	C. R. Sundar	Book Divine Tirukkural	Chennai (Vignesh Pathippakam)	2001	Complete–Verse		
15	English	Subramanian, V. K.	Pearls of Wisdom: Tirukkural (Tamil: Tirukkural Cintanai Muttukkal)	Chennai (M.T.S. Academy India)	2001		82 p.	
15	English	Kandiah, A., Jayadevan, V. and Buckingham, L. A.	Gleanings from Tirukkural for a Multicultural Society	Strathfield South, New South Wales, Australia (Natanalaya Publication)	2002	Selections	47 pages. Bilingual edition; ISBN: 0975065335	
15	English	V. Padmanabhan	Thirukkural with English Explanation	Chennai (Manimekalai Prasuram)	2003	Complete–Prose	268 pages	How can you consider the person eating the flesh of other creatures to strengthen his own, as merciful?
15	English	Kannan, K.	Thirukkural Expressed in English	Madurai (Papa Publications)	2003	Complete–Prose		
15	English	Manickavasagam, S.	Thirukkural: Tamil text, its paraphrase, Roman rendering and English translation	New Delhi (Richa Prakashan)	2003	Prose		
15	English	Perampalam, V.	The Sacred Kural of Thiruvalluvar; A path to purposeful living	Chennai	2003		288 pages	
15	English	O. R. Krishnaswami	The Wisdom of Tirukkural—A Guide to Living	Mumbai (Bharatiya Vidya Bhavan)	2004	Partial–Prose	Translated Books I and II only; 489 pages	
15	English	Anantham Krishnamurthy and R. Shahjahan	Thirukkural (Original text, Romanization with English and French translations)	New Delhi (Richa Prakashan)	2004		676 pages; ISBN: 8187062738	
15	English	Varadarajan, P.	Thirukkural: The Voice From Within	New Delhi (National Council of Educational Research and Training)	2004	Complete	136 pages	
15	English	M. D. Jayabalan		Cheyyar (Mavanna Publications)	2005	Partial–Verse	Translated only 321 couplets	
15	English	Govindarajulu, G.	Quintessence of Thirukkural	Chennai (ANK Prints)	2005			
15	English	Krishnaswamy, K. and Vijaya Ramkumar	Unpublished online translation	Online	2005	Complete	Previously available at acharya.iitm.ac.in	
15	English	Morgan Yegambaram	Thirukkural for Children	Durban, South Africa	2005			
15	English	Ponnaiah, S. M.	A Tapestry of Tamil Poetry	Kuala Lumpur (University of Malaya Press)	2005	Selections	Translated 133 couplets only	
15	English	Deivanayaki Thirumalai	Book of Virtue in Rhythmic Verses	Chennai (Perfect Xerox)	2005	Partial	Translated only Book I; translated 100 more couplets in 2014	
15	English	David Pratap Singh	Tirukkural	Madurai (Master Pathippakam)	2006	Complete–Verse	396 pages	
15	English	S. Ratnakumar	Tirukkural: A Guide to Effective Living	Singapore (Tamils Representative Council)	2006	Complete–Prose	267 pages	
15	English	Ashraf, N. V. K.	Tirukkural: Getting Close to the Original	Online	2006	Selections–Prose	English translations of various authors; translated about 200 couplets	
15	English	Annamalai, M.	Thirukkural: Tamil–English	Chennai (Santha Publications)	2006		76 pages	
15	English	Kalladan	Tirukkural Readings and Reflections	Chennai (Manivasagam Publications)	2007		273 pages	
15	English	Srinivasan, V.	Thirukkural	(Sri Vijeyam Publishers)	2007			
15	English	Jayabalan, M. D.	Thirukkural in English	Cheyyar	2008	Selections	Translated a selections of 317 couplets from all the three books	
15	English	Soundarrajan, C. R.	Thirukkural Uraikkalanjiam	(Thiruvarasu Puthaka Nilayam)	2008		960 pages	
15	English	Chellaiah Yogarathinam	Tirukkural in English	Chennai (Manimekalai Prasuram)	2008			
15	English	Ira. Ilangkannanaar	Bilingual Tirukkural	(KPK Memorial Political Souvenir)	2008	Partial	Translated only 1049 couplets	
15	English	V. Murugan	Thirukkural in English	Chennai (Arivu Pathippagam)	2009	Complete–Verse		How will compassion hold him under its reign Who feeds on others' flesh to fatten his own?
15	English	Moorthy Rajaram	Thirukkural: Pearls of Inspiration	New Delhi (Rupa Publication)	2009	Complete—Verse	272 pages; ISBN_HB: 9788129114587	How could one ever be compassionate If one fattens on animal meat?
15	English	Moorthy Rajaram	Thirukkural: Pearls of Inspiration	New Delhi (Rupa Publication)	2009	Complete—Prose		One who fattens himself feeding on the animal flesh can never be kind to others.
15	English	N. E. Ramalingam	Thirukkural Commentary in Tamil and English	Chennai (Thiruvalluvar Pathippagam)	2009	Complete—Prose		How can one be kind hearted when he eats the flesh of other beings to increase his own flesh?
15	English	Damo Bullen	Unpublished	N/A	2009			
15	English	Pasupathy Dhanaraj	Tirukkural: Tenets for Right Living	Chennai (Mathushree Imprints)	2009		284 pages	
15	English	Ramiah, B.	Tirukkural: English Explanation	Pudukkottai (Pudukkottai Thirukkural Kazhagam)	2009	Selections	Translated only 330 couplets	
15	English	Subramani, B. R. M.	Thirukkural: Righteousness: Morals and Virtues	(Dravidian University)	2010	Partial	Translated only Books I and II; published in two volumes	
15	English	R. Viswanathan	Thirukkural: Universal Tamil Scripture: Alongwith [sic] the Commentary of Parimalazhagar in English	Mumbai (Bharatiya Vidya Bhavan)	2011	Complete—Prose	278 pages with Tamil text and English translation; ISBN 978-81-7276-448-7	
15	English	A. Gopalakrishnan	Tirukkural—Thiruvalluvar Karutthurai	Chidambaram (Meiyappan Padhippagam)	2012	Complete—Prose	Authored both Tamil commentary and English translation	How can one possess kindness towards the living beings; when he himself eats the flesh of other living beings to increase his own flesh?
15	English	S. John Sahayam	Tirukkural—English translation	Chennai (Vanathi Padhippagam)	2012			
15	English	Vaidehi Herbert	Thirukkural in English	Online	2012	Complete	Translatated all the three books	
15	English	T. Kannan	Online		2013	Partial—Prose	Translated Book I and II; Book III in progress as of 2024	
15	English	Singaravelu Sachithanantham	Karya Etika Tamil Berjudul Thirukkuṛaḷ	Malaysia (Uma Publications)	2013	Complete—Verse	Trilingual version with Tamil original and Malay and English versions translated by the translator.	How would one, who kills the body of another being, and eats the meat of that being to enlarge one's own body, become one, who nurtures Arul ('compassion')?
15	English	Anonymous	Kural Abridged—Damowords	Online	2013	Complete	Single-line translation	
15	English	S. P. Guruparan	Thirukkural: English Translation	Chennai (Mayilavan Padhippagam)	2014	Complete—Verse		(a) If one eats the flesh of another (creature) to fatten his body How can he be a charitable person? (b) To strengthen his body if another body is eaten by one How can he be a compassionate one?!!
15	English	Gopalkrishna Gandhi	Tiruvalluvar—The Tirukkural: A New English Version	New Delhi (Aleph Classics)	2015	Complete—Verse		How can one not see the ugliness of eating meat? How can one made of flesh another's flesh eat?
15	English	Jyothirllata Girija	Voice of Valluvar: Tirukkural the Tamil Veda, rendered in rhyming couplets	Allahabad (Cyberwit.net)	2015	Complete—Verse	Paperback available online	
15	English	R. Venkatachalam	Thirukkural—Translation—Explanation: A Life Skills Coaching Approach	Gurgaon (Partridge Publishing India)	2015	Complete—Verse		
15	English	S. Kasipandiyan	Thiruvalluvar on Human Destiny	(Allied Publishers Limited)	2016	Complete		
15	English	Narayanalakshmi	Thirukkural of Thiruvalluvar		2016	Complete—Prose	Five volumes	
15	English	Ajayan Thenmala	Tiruvalluvar Tirukkural (Trilingual)	(Bhairavi Publications)	2017		282 pages (with Hindi, English and Malayalam translations)	
15	English	V. K. Parameswaran Pillai	Kural	Madras				
15	English	Madurai Babaraj	Thirukkural—Virtue	Chennai (B. Vasantha)	2018	Complete—Prose		How can one be merciful if one eats flesh of animals to develop his corporeal frame?
15	English	R. J. A. Stephen Loie	Thirukkural English Couplet	Chennai (Palaniappa Brothers)	2018		208 pages; ISBN: 978-93-88139-60-1	
15	English	R. Jayaprakasam	Thirukkural: Text in English & Tamil	Chennai (Porselvi Pathippagam)	2019	Complete—Prose		How could he who eat the flesh for proliferation of his own flesh and body be enough compassionate?
15	English	Pattu M. Bhoopathi	Thus Blossoms Love: A Transcreation of Kamattupal in Modern Verse	Chennai (Sandhya Publications)	2019	Partial—Verse	Translated Book III alone in modern verse form	Not translated
15	English	Jeevendiran Chemen	Tirukkural (Volume 1 & 2: Domestic life and Ascetic life)	Ebene, Mauritius (self-published)	2020	Partial	Translated Book I alone in English and French	
15	English	Lakshman Naresh	Tirukkural in English (Thiruvalluvar Book 1)	Kindle edition	2020		178 pages	
15	English	Varadaraja V. Raman	Tirukkural (Book I) in English: As Rhyming Couplets with the Core Ideas	Kindle edition	2020		161 pages (SIN: B086VVN-5HQ)	
15	English	J. S. Anantha Krishnan	Thiruvalluvar's Thirukkural	Kollam (Dream Bookbindery)	2021	Complete—Verse		
15	English	N. Doraiswamy	Tirukkural in Easy English (Vol. 1) (Vol. 2 On Love)	Chennai (Notion Press)	2021		154 pages; published again in 2022 (300 pages)	
15	English	Kavikkuyil Anaivaariyar	Thirukkural: Pearls of Wisdom from Classical Tamil Series	Chennai (Notion Press)	2021		322 pages	
15	English	P. Subramanian	Thirukkural—A Comprehensive Vision for Life	(Jazym Books)	2021		552 pages	
15	English	Thomas Hitoshi Pruiksma	The Kural: Tiruvalluvar's Tirukkural	Boston (Beacon Press)	2022	Complete	256 pages	
15	English	R. Manimohan	THIRUKKURAL 108	[Emerald Publishers] & Kindle Edition	2024	Partial	Books I and II	
15	English	Karen Goel	Thirukkural	Chennai (Notion Press)	2022		226 pages, paperback; ISBN: 979-8885556408	
15	English	T. Anatharani and K. Bhagat Singh	The Chapter on Wealth	(Yes Dee Publishing)	2022	Partial	162 pages; ISBN: 978-9391549237	
15	English	S. B. Chakraborthy	Thirukkural	Chennai (Discovery Publications)	2023			
15	English	Meena Kandasamy	The Book of Desire	New Delhi (Penguin Random House India)	2023	Partial—Prose	Translated Book III alone in feministic viewpoint	Not translated
15	English	R. Natarajan	The Kural: English Translation of the Ancient Tamil Text Thirukkural	Chennai (Rare Publications)	2023	Complete	144 pages. ISBN: 978-9383826643	
15	English	K. Dhevendhiran	Tirukkural: English version	Kindle edition	2023		221 pages	
15	English	A. Rajamanickam	The Holy Kural: A Comprehensive Prose Rendering Work	(Thamarai Publications)	2023		ISBN: 978-8123445236	
15	English	Theanmozhi Chembian	Thirukkural English Translation in Seven Words	(PeriyarBooks.com)	2023		283 pages	
15	English	K. M. A. Ahamed Zubair	Thirukkural: Universal Book	London (Shams Publishing Inc.)	2024	Complete		
16	Fijian	Samuel L. Berwick	Na Tirukurala	Nadi, Fiji (Sri Ramakrishna Mission)	1964	Complete		Loloma cava me tu tale vua, Ke lewe ni manumanu e sa sagaa Ena nona kocova wale ga Me vakamatea me uro vua.
16	Fijian	Paul Geraghty	Tirukurali Na sere tabu	Suva, Fiji (Reddy Group of Companies)	2008	Complete		E rawa vakacava ni yalololoma e dua ni dau kania na lewenimanumanu me ikuri ni lewe ni yogona.
17	Finnish	Pentti Aalto	Kural—The Ancient Tamil Classic	Helsinki (Societas Orientalis Fennica)	1972	Selections		
17	Finnish	Asko Parpola	Etelä-intialainen mieterunoelma Tirukkural (n. 500 jKr)	(Unpublished)	1980	Partial	Translated the first 175 couplets from Book I	
18	French	Anonymous	Kural de Thiruvalluvar, Selections	Paris	1767	Selections		
18	French	E. S. Ariel	Kural de Thiruvalluvar (Traduits du Tamoul)	Paris	1848	Selections		
18	French	P. G. de Dumast			1854			
18	French	Pierre-Eugène Lamairesse	Thirukural in French	Pondicherry	1867			
18	French	Louis Jacolliot		Paris (A Lacroix)	1876			
18	French	G. Barrigue de Fontainieu	Le Livre de l'amour de Thiruvalluva	Paris (Lemerre)	1889			
18	French	Julien Vinson		Pondicherry	1893			
18	French	Alain Daniélou	Thiruvallouvar Kural	Pondicherry	1942			
18	French	Gnanou Diagou	Tirou Vallouvar Koural (Thirukural in French)	Pondicherry (Sandhanam); New Delhi (Asian Educational Services)	1942	Complete—Prose		Comment celui qui mange la chair d'un autre être animé, pour engraisser la sienne, peut-il se laisser gagner par la miséricorde.
18	French	Antonio Sorrentino		(Francois Gros. Greenhouse 2)	1986			
18	French	Mootoocoomaren Sangeelee	Tirouk Koural	(Editions de L'Ocean Indien)	1988			
18	French	François Gros	Le Livre de l'Amour	Paris (Gallimard, Collection UNESCO)	1992			
18	French	S. Singh		New Delhi (Richa Prakashan)	2003			
18	French	Rama Valayden		Port Louis, Mauritius	2007			
18	French	T. Janakiraman Kalladan		Kalladan, T. Janakiraman	2016			
18	French	Jeevendiran Chemen	Tirukkural (Volume 1 & 2: Domestic life and Ascetic life)	Ebene, Mauritius (self-published)	2020	Partial	Translated Book I alone in English and French	
18	French	Sachchithanantham, Sathasivam	Le Tiroukkoural: Encyclopédie de sagesse tamoule	Paris (Librairie Le Phénix)	2024		Edited by L'Harmattan; ISBN: 9782140493607	
19	Garo	A. Antoni Selvadoss	Rongtalgipa Poido	Meghalaya	2000	Complete—Verse		
20	German	August Friedrich Caemmerer	Thirukural waith German Translation	Leipzig	1803			Wie kann er zutreffendes Mitleid üben, das das Fleisch eines Tieres ißt, um sein eigenes Fleisch zu mästen?
20	German	Friedrich Rückert	Thirukural, Selections	Berlin	1847	Selections		
20	German	Karl Graul	Der Kural des Tiruvalluver. Ein gnomisches Gedicht über die drei Strebeziele des Menschen.	London (William & Norgate) and Leipzig (F. A. Brockhaus)	1856	Complete	Published as the third volume (220 pages) of the four-volume work Bibliotheca Tamulica sive Opera Praecipia Tamuliensium	Wer, das eigne Fleisch zu mehren, fremdes Fleisch geniesst, — wie wird Der der Huld pflegen?
20	German	Fenz Albrecht and K. Lalithambal	Thirukural von Thiruvalluvar aus dem Tamil	Madurai	1877			Ißt jemand Fleisch von anderen Kreaturen, um sein eigenes Fleisch zu vermehren – wie kann er Gnade erlangen?
20	German	Albert Schweitzer						
20	German	Uwe Beissert		Basel (Project Ohms [AUM])	1990			
21	Greek							Πώς μπορεί κάποιος, που τρώει τη σάρκα άλλων για να φουσκώσει τη δική του σάρκα, να δείξει συμπόνοια;
22	Gujarati	Najuklal Choksi	Thirukural	Ahmedabad(Sastu Sahitya)	1931			
22	Gujarati	Kantilal L. Kalani	Thirukural in Gujarati	Bombay (University Book Board of Gujarat State)	1971	Select	Translated only 852 couplets (from all chapters). Republished in 1985 by Sardar Patel University, Vallabh Vidhya Nagar.	
22	Gujarati	P. C. Kokila	Thirukkural in Gujarathi	Chennai (Central Institute of Classical Tamil)	2015	Complete		સ્વમાંસ પોષણ હેતુ જે અન્ય (પ્રાણી)ના માંસનું કરે ભક્ષણ દયાભાવ કેમ કરી હોય તેના (મન) માં?
23	Hindi	Khenand Rakar	Thirukural, Parts 1 and 2	Ajmer	1924		Republished in 1969.	
23	Hindi	Khan Chand Rahit			1926			
23	Hindi	Govindaraj Shastri Jain	Kural in Verse, First two parts	New Delhi	1942			
23	Hindi	B. D. Jain	Thirukural	Thirupananthal	1952		Republished in 1961.	
23	Hindi	S. Sankar Raju Naidu	Tamil Ved	Madras (University of Madras Press)	1958			
23	Hindi	M. G. Venkatakrishnan	Thirukural	Trichy	1964	Complete	Revised and enlarged edition published November 1998 by Sakthi Finance Ltd., Madras	माँस-वृद्धि अपनी समझ, जो खाता पर माँस। कैसे दयार्द्रता-सुगुण, रहता उसके पास॥
23	Hindi		Uttar Ved		1967			
23	Hindi	Rajan Pillai	Thirukural	Lucknow	1976			
23	Hindi	K. Seshadri	Thirukural in Hindi	Lucknow	1982			
23	Hindi		Satsai		1982	Selections	Translated 700 couplets	
23	Hindi				1989			
23	Hindi	T. E. S. Raghavan	Thirukkural		1990	Complete—Verse	Rendered a poetic rendition in 'Venba' metre as in the source	
23	Hindi	Ananda Sandhidut	Kural Kavitā Valī		2000			
23	Hindi		Thirukkural	New Delhi (Bhartiya Gyanpith)	2014		ISBN: 978-9326352543	
23	Hindi	Ajayan Thenmala	Tiruvalluvar Tirukkural (Trilingual)	(Bhairavi Publications)	2017		282 pages (with Hindi, English and Malayalam translations)	
23	Hindi	S. Anandakrishnan	Thirukkural-1	Chennai (Notion Press)	2020		46 pages; ISBN: 978-1648925894	
23	Hindi	Pawan Kumar Singh and Rama Kant Singh	Thirukkural: Hindi Padyaanuvaad	(Writers Choice)	2021		ISBN: 978-8194953685	
23	Hindi	Nilesh Kumar Agarwal	Tirukkural	Chennai (Notion Press)	2021		262 pages; ISBN: 978-1639973828	
23	Hindi	M. Govindarajan	Tirukkur̲aḷ – Translations into Hindi	Chennai (CICT)	2023	Verse	650 pages; ISBN: 978-93-81744-70-3	अपने मांस की वृद्धि, हेतू खाय पर-मांस। कैसे करें उसके पास, धया भाव की आस॥
23	Hindi	M. Govindarajan	Tirukkur̲aḷ – Translations into Hindi	Chennai (CICT)	2023	Prose	650 pages; ISBN: 978-93-81744-70-3	अपने शरीर का आमिष बढ़ाने हेतु दूसरे प्राणियों का मांस खाने वाले के हृदय में दया का भाव कैसे हो सकता है?
24	Indonesian	A. S. Kobalen	Tuntunan Bijak: Dari Masa ke Masa [Tirukural by Tiruwalluar]			Complete—Prose		Bagaimana seseorang mungkin memiliki sifat iba, yang memiliki maksud menambah daging jasadnya sendiri, akan memakan daging hewan lain.
24	Indonesian	M. Pazhanichamy		Medan, Indonesia				
25	Irish	Gabriel Rosenstock	An Thirukkural as Gaeilge (ISBN 978-1782013136)		2023	Complete		
26	Italian	Antonio Sorrentino	Tirukkural. Le massime di Tiruvalluvar	Naples (Ist Universitario Orientale Studi asiatici. Serie tre (Dept. of Asiatic Studies))	1986	Complete	226 pages	Come può esercitarsi nella pietà allineare che mangia la carne di un animale per ingrassare la sua propria carne?
27	Japanese	Shuzo Matsunaga	Thirukkural	Osaka	1981 (August)			彼はいかに彼自身の肉を太らせるために動物の肉を食べる本当の同情を練習してもいいか。
27	Japanese	Takanobu Takahashi	Thirukkural: Sacred Verses of Ancient Tamil	Tokyo (Heibonsha)	1999			
27	Japanese	Balamurugan Kasinathan	Tirukkur̲aḷ – Translations into Japanese	Chennai (CICT)	2023	Complete	ISBN: 978-81-19249-29-9	
28	Kannada	B. M. Srikanthaiah	Kural (Selections in verses)	Bangalore	1940	Selections—Verse		
28	Kannada	L. Gundappa	Thirukural Dharma Bhaga (Chapter on Virtue)	Bangalore	1955	Partial	Published a complete translation in 1960 under the title Thirukural (3 parts).	
28	Kannada	L. Gundappa	Thirukural (3 parts)	Madras	1960	Complete		
28	Kannada	P. S. Srinivas	Thirukural with Original Couplets and Translations in Kannada	Madurai	1982	Complete—Prose		ತನ್ನ ಮೈ ಮಾಂಸವನ್ನು ಬೆಳಸಿಕೊಳ್ಳಲು ಇತರ ಪ್ರಾಣಿಗಳ ಮೈಮಾಂಸವನ್ನು ತಿನ್ನುವವನು ಹೇಗೆ ತಾನೆ ಕರುಣೆಯಿಂದ ಬಾಳಬಲ್ಲನು?
28	Kannada	N. Munusamy	Thirukural in Kannada		1985			
28	Kannada	K. Jayaraman	Thirukural with Original Couplets and Translations in Kannada	Mysore	2001			
28	Kannada	S. Srinivasan	Tirukkural in Kannada	Chennai	2014	Complete—Verse		ತನ್ನೊಡಲ ಬೆಳೆಸಲು ಉಣಲು ಬೇರೆ ಬಾಡನು ತನ್ನೊಳು ಕರುಣೆ ಬರುವದೆಂತು?
29	Kashmiri	Beena Budki	Tirukkur̲aḷ – Translations into Kashmiri	Chennai (CICT)	2023	Complete	ISBN: 978-81-19249-31-2	
30	Khmer	Thang Rou	Tirukkur̲aḷ – Translations into Khmer	Chennai (CICT)	2022	Complete	812 pages; ISBN: 978-93-81744-91-8	
31	Konkani	Narayana Purushothama Mallaya	Thirukkural in Konkani	Kochi (Konkani Bhasha Prachar Sabha)	2002	Complete—Verse	Began translating in 1987. Translation released on 23 June 2002.	अन्नदान करचाक तागेले मांस, कोण माम्स भक्षण कर्ता,। कसले करुणायुक्त औदार्य, तसले मनुष्य अनुमान कर्ता?॥
31	Konkani	Suresh Gundu Amonkar						
31	Konkani	Gowri R. Mallya		Mangaluru	2023			
32	Kodava	C. M. Revathi	Tirukkur̲aḷ – Translations into Kodava	Chennai (CICT)	2023	Complete	ISBN: 978-81-19249-40-4	
33	Koraga	Babu Koraga, Sayeegeetha, and A. Meenakshi	Tirukkur̲aḷ – Translations into Koraga	Chennai (CICT)	2023	Complete	ISBN: 978-81-19249-39-8	
34	Korean							그는 어떻게 그 자신의 살을 살찌기 위하여 동물의 살을 먹는 진실한 연민을 실행해서 좋은가?
34	Korean	Sri Saravana Enterprises	Thirukkural	Chennai (International Institute of Tamil Studies)	2017	Complete—Prose		동물의 고기를 먹어 스스로 살찌우는 사람은 타인에게 결코 친절할 수 없다.
34	Korean	P. Sahaya Darcius	Thirukkural		2024	Complete		
35	Latin	Constanzo Beschi	Thirukural (Books I and II)	London	1730	Partial—Prose		Qui ut sua caro pinguoscat, alienas carnes comedit quinam eum viveutibus lenitatem et clementiam exercere dicetur?
35	Latin	Karl Graul	Kural of Tiruvalluver. High-Tamil Text with Translation into Common Tamil and Latin, Notes and Glossary	Tranquebar	1865		Published as the fourth volume (348 pages) of the four-volume work Bibliotheca Tamulica sive Opera Praecipia Tamuliensium	Qui ut suam earnem augeat, alienas carnes comedit, quomodo is benevolentia utetur?
36	Maithili	Ramchandra Roy	Tirukkur̲aḷ – Translations into Maithili	Chennai (Central Institute of Classical Tamil)	2023	Complete	ISBN: 978-93-81744-19-2	
37	Malay	Ramily Bin Haji Thakir	Thirukural (in verses)	Kuala Lumpur (Kural Ilakkam)	1964			
37	Malay	Hussein Ismail	Thirukural Sastera Kalasik Tamil Yang	Kuala Lumpur (Jabatan Pengajian India)	1967			
37	Malay	G. Soosai	Thirukkural dalam bahasa Melayu (Thirukkural Kitab Murni Tamil Nadu)	Kuala Lumpur	1978		Reprinted in 1991	Insan maging menikmati kekejaman Tanpa belasan mengemukakan badan.
37	Malay	NA		(Persatuan Hindu Universiti, Malaysia)	1997			
37	Malay	M. Rajentheran/Kumaran		Malaysia (Uma Publications)	2003			
37	Malay	Singaravelu Sachithanantham	Tirukkural translations into English (Thirukkural Tribahasa)	Malaysia (Uma Publications)	2013	Complete—Verse	Trilingual version with Tamil original and Malay and English versions translated by the translator.	Bagaimanakah orang, yang membunuh tubuh makhluk lain, dan makan daging makhluk itu untuk membesarkan badannya sendiri, akan menjadi orang, yang memelihara arul (belas kasihan)?
37	Malay	Arulselvan Raju	Tirukkur̲aḷ – Translations into Malay	Chennai (CICT)	2023	Complete	ISBN: 978-81-19249-42-8	
38	Malayalam	I. V. Ramaswamy Iyer	Malayalathil Kural	Trivandrum	1595		First ever translation of the Kural text in any language.	
38	Malayalam	Perunazhi Krishna Vaidhyan	Kural	Trivandrum	1863		Partly translated. Republished in 1894.	
38	Malayalam	Azhakathu Kurup	Thirukural in Verses	Trivandrum	1875	Verse		
38	Malayalam	A. Govinda Pillai	Thirukural	Trivandrum	1899		Translation currently unavailable	
38	Malayalam	P. Damodaran Pillai	Thirukural Manikal	Trivandrum	1951			
38	Malayalam	Sasthamangalam Ramakrishna Pillai	Ramakrishna Tirukkural	Trivandrum	1957		Translation completed 1933 with comprehensive commentary and notes, but published September 1957 with abridged commentary	
38	Malayalam	Parmeshram				Partial	Translated only Books I and II	
38	Malayalam	Vennikkulam Gopala Kurup	Thirukural	Kottayam (Writers Co-operative Society)	1957	Partial—Verse	Reprinted in 1960 with translations for Books I and II in verse	
38	Malayalam	K. Chellan Nadar	Thirukural Tharmanaskantam	Parassala	1962			
38	Malayalam	Tiruvallam G. Bhaskaran Nair	Bhasha Tirukkural (Dharmakandam)	Trivandrum (Arul Nilayam)	1962	Partial—Prose	Translated only Book I. Published with the original Tamil verse transliterated in Malayalam and a Malayalam commentary in prose.	
38	Malayalam	G. Balakrishnan Nair	Kural with Commentary, Part I	Trivandrum	1963	Partial		
38	Malayalam	S. Ramesan Nair	Thirukkural Malayalam Vivarthanam	Trivandrum (Trust Publications)	1998		Translated into old Malayalam	
38	Malayalam	V. V. Abdulla Sahib	Thirukkural	Erode (Gupta Press)	2002			തൻ ദേഹം നിലനിർത്താനായ് മറുദേഹം ഭുജിപ്പവൻ ജീവകാരുണ്യമുള്ളോനെന്നുരചെയ്യുവതെങ്ങനെ?
38	Malayalam	K. G. Chandrasekaran Nair	Thirukkural (Sampoornabhashyam)	Thiruvananthapuram (All Kerala Tamizh Federation)	2002	Prose	Published by D. C. Books, Kottayam in 2003	
38	Malayalam	M. R. R. Variar	Thirukkural		2003			
38	Malayalam	Shailaja Ravindran	Thirukkural	Kottayam (D. C. Books)	2007			
38	Malayalam	Ajayan Thenmala	Tiruvalluvar Tirukkural (Trilingual)	(Bhairavi Publications)	2017		282 pages (with Hindi, English and Malayalam translations)	
38	Malayalam	N. Manoharan	Tirukkur̲aḷ – Translations into Malayalam	Chennai (CICT)	2022		489 pages; ISBN: 978-93-81744-67-3	
39	Manipuri	Soibam Rebika Devi	Tirukkural in Manipuri	Chennai (Central Institute of Classical Tamil)	2014	Complete—Prose		মশাবূ থাক্ননবা অতোপ্ত্রা জীবগী শদোঙ চাবা মীওই অদুগী মথম্মোইদা করন্না মীনুংশি ফাওগদৌরিবানা?
40	Marathi	Sane Guruji	Kavi Tiruvalluvar Kural (Kural: Theen Purushartha)	Pune (Continental Publishers)	1930	Complete–Prose	Translated in 1930, but officially published 1948. Second edition in 1960 and reprints in 1975 and 1987.	स्वतःची चरबी वाढावी म्हणून दुसन्या प्राण्यांचे जो मांस खातो; त्याला दया कशी बरे कधी वाटेल?
40	Marathi	Narayana Govindarao Peshwe and Ganpath Govindarao Peshwe	(Thirukkural)	Belgaum (Dhananjay Press)	1930	Partial–Prose	Translated only the first 89 chapters. First appeared in Lokamitra journal.	
40	Marathi	Purushottam Dinkar Joshi	Thiruvalluvar Virchit Tirukkural	Mumbai (Maharashtra State Literature and Cultural Board)	1977	Complete–Prose	Direct translation from the Tamil original.	
40	Marathi	N. Lalitha	Tirukkur̲aḷ – Translations into Marathi	Chennai (CICT)	2022	Complete	434 pages; ISBN: 978-93-81744-69-7	
41	Nepali	Sunita Dahal	Tirukkur̲aḷ – Translations into Nepali	Chennai (CICT)	2022	Complete	540 pages; ISBN: 978-93-81744-60-4	
42	Norwegian	Kevin Raja Kowsihaa Gowsegan Gowrithasan Krogh	Thiruvalluvar sin Thirukkural på Norsk	Oslo	2017	Complete—Verse		
43	Odia	Chittaranjan Das	Kural (Oriya)	Bhubaneswar (Bharatiya Vidya Bhavan)	1978			
43	Odia	Kishrod Dash Ch	Thirukuralu—In Oriya Language	Sambalpur	1985	Verse		
43	Odia	Nityanada Acharya	Tirukkural: Book of Sacred Couplets	Balangir (Agragami Karyalaya)	1992	Partial	Books I and II only	
43	Odia	G. N. Das	Vidyapuri	Cuttack (Bidyapuri)	1994	Complete—Verse		
43	Odia	Biswanath Misra	Tirukkural	Bhubaneswar	1996			
43	Odia	Balaram Rout	Thirukkural	Delhi (Sahitya Akademi)	2017	Complete		
43	Odia	Giribala Mohanty	Tirukkur̲aḷ – Translations into Odia	Chennai (CICT)	2022	Complete	449 pages; ISBN: 978-93-81744-68-0	
44	Punjabi	Ram Murti Sharma	Thirukural Dhamma Granth of the Tamils	Chandigarh	1983			
44	Punjabi	Tarlochan Singh Bedi	Tirukkural in Punjabi	Chennai (Central Institute of Classical Tamil)	2012	Complete—Verse		ਆਪਣਾ ਮਾਸ ਵਧਾਉਣ ਲਈ ਦੂਸਰੇ ਜੀਵਾਂ ਦਾ ਮਾਸ ਖਾਣ ਵਾਲੇ ਵਿੱਚ ਦਇਆ ਭਾਵਨਾ ਕਿਵੇਂ ਹੋ ਸਕਦੀ ਹੈ
45	Persian	S. Sathappan	Tirukkur̲aḷ – Translations into Persian	Chennai (CICT)	2022	Complete	446 pages; ISBN: 978-93-81744-76-5	
46	Polish	Umadevi, Wandy Dynowskiej	Tiruwalluwar: Tiru-Kural	Madras (Biblioteka Polsko-Indyjska)	1958	Partial	141 pages	
46	Polish	Bohdan Gębarski	Tiruwalluwar "Tirukkural" ("Kural"). Święta księga południowych Indii	Wrocław, Poland (Ossolineum)(Europa Publisher)	1977	Complete—Verse	152 pages; published again in 1998.	Pożeraczem żywego nie może być człowiek, Co wyznaje zasady pokoju.
47	Rajasthani	Kamala Gurg	Thirukural Needhi Sastra	Jaipur	1982			
48	Russian	J. J. Glazov and A. Krishnamurthi	Thirukural, a Book on Virtue, Politics and Love	Moscow (Yodatel'stvovostvo Enog Literatury)	1963	Complete—Prose		Как может испытывать сострадание пожирающий плоть других живых созданий ради наращивания своей собственной?
48	Russian	D. V. Burba			1964	Select–Prose	Translated the English translation of select couplets by C. Rajagopalachari, which contained 555 couplets from Book I and Book II.	Not translated
48	Russian	Alif Ibragimov (Ibrahimov)	Thirukural in Couplets with Illustrations	Moscow	1974			
48	Russian	Vithali Furniki	Thirukkural	Moscow (Library of Popular Literature)	1990	Complete—Prose		Разве может испытывать чувства сострадания человек, который поедает плоть других живых существ для увеличения своей плоти?
49	Sanskrit	Thyagasamudram Shri Chakrapani Iyer			18th century	Verse		
49	Sanskrit	Appa Vajapeyin	Suniti Kusuma Mala	Kumbakonam (Gururajachariar)	1922	Verse		
49	Sanskrit	Sankara Subramanya Sastri	Sugati Ratnaakaraa		1937–1940	Verse	Published as "Sugati Ratnaakaraa" in the journal Sahridaya	
49	Sanskrit	Anonymous (perhaps Vidya Bhushanam Pandit Shri Govindaraya Shastri)		Delhi	1940	Verse	Contains prose explanation in Hindi	
49	Sanskrit	Kaliyan Ramanuja Jeer		Nanguneri	1956	Verse		
49	Sanskrit	S. N. Sriramadesikan	Thirukural in Sanskrit Slokas	Madras	1961	Complete—Verse	Revised edition published in 1968.	पोषणार्थे स्वदेहस्य कृत्वा य: प्राणिहिंसनम्। तन्मांसभक्षणपर: स दयावान् कथं भवेत्॥
49	Sanskrit	H. A. Chakrapani Iyer	Tiruvalluvar in Sanskrit		1983	Verse		
49	Sanskrit	V. Indrajithu	Thirukural Sanskrit Translation	Mangudi (Athirai Publication)	2021	Complete—Verse		स्वमांसवर्धनार्थं यो मांसं खादति प्राणिनः। स कथं करुणाशीलो भविष्यति महीतले॥
49	Sanskrit	S. Rajagopalan	Tirukkur̲aḷ – Translations into Sanskrit	Chennai (CICT)	2022	Complete	440 pages; ISBN: 978-93-81744-79-6	
50	Santali	Ref. Fr. Richard V. Joe	Torjakmayic Thirukkural—Nerunji Ilakkiya Iyakkam			Partial (Book I)		Aćaḱ jel ạsuloḱ lạgiť etaḱ-jel jojomkore Cekate rajoḱa sạhại?
51	Saurashtra	S. Sankhu Ram	Saurastra Thirukural Payiram—Pitika Pragaranam	Madurai (Siddhasramam)	1980	Complete—Verse	Published posthumously. Republished in 1993.	அபுல்தனு ஹொட்^{3}வன்அப்லான் ஆஸிது^{3}ஸ்தன் கா^{2}த்தெனு கோனக ஸவ்கன் த^{3}யொ?
51	Saurashtra	T. R. Damodaran	Tirukkur̲aḷ – Translations into Saurashtri	Chennai (CICT)	2022	Complete	440 pages; ISBN: 978-93-81744-79-6	
52	Sinhalese	Govokgada M. Misihamy	Thiruvalluvar's Kural	Colombo (Anula Publishers)	1961	Complete		තම සිරුර වඩනුව – අන්සතූ සිරුරු කන්නා කරුණාව සිත තූළ – ඇති කරන්නේ කවර අයුරුද?
52	Sinhalese	Charles De Silva	Sirigiya (Thirukural in Sinhalese)	Colombo (Sri Lanka Sahitya Mandalaya)	1964			
53	Spanish	G. Arul			1968			
53	Spanish	Sakthi Kumar/Kannan Kumar		Kindle Edition				
53	Spanish	John Buckthese Chinnappan	Las Perlas Antiguas Tirukural en Español	Atlantic City, NJ	2024			¿Cómo puede alguien poseer bondad, si uno come carne de otro cuerpo para hacer crecer el propio cuerpo?
54	Swedish	Yngve Frykholm	Tirukkural sydindisk levnadsvisdom, statskunskap och kärlekskonst sammanfattad i 1330 epigram av tamilskalden Tiruvalluvar	Uddevalla	1971	Complete—Prose		Hur skall den kunna behärskas av godhet som äter andra varelsers kött för att hans eget kött må stärkas?
55	Telugu	Venkatrama Srividyanandaswami	Trivarga Dipika	Nellore	1877			
55	Telugu	Sakkam Narasimhalu Naidu	Trivargamu		1892	Partial		
55	Telugu	Venkatram	Nīti Mañcari					
55	Telugu	Lakshminarayana Sastri	Kural	Chittoor	1906			
55	Telugu	P. Sriramulu Reddi	Trivargamu	Putthalapatti	1948			
55	Telugu	Jagannatha Sastri, Mudiganthi	Thiruvalluva Sookthalu	West Godavari	1952			
55	Telugu	Challa Radhakrishna Sarma	Tamila Vedhamu	Madras	1954			
55	Telugu	Jalayya	Nitisudha		1955			
55	Telugu	Sonti Sripati Sastry	Sri Padula		1966			
55	Telugu	Gurucharan Dutaluri Jagannadham	Tirukkural of Tiruvalluvar in Telugu	Kuppam (Dravidian University)	1986	Verse		బలియ గోరి తాను బలిజేయు జీవుల నట్టి కెట్టు లమరు తరుణ
55	Telugu	Jayaprakash	Tirukkural in Telugu	Chennai (Central Institute of Classical Tamil)	2014	Complete–Prose		తన శరీరంలోని కండలు పెంచుకోవడం కోసం వేరొక ప్రాణి శరీరాన్ని ఆహారంగా స్వీకరించేవారు ఏ విధంగా దయా స్వభావులవుతారు?
56	Thai				2019	Complete	Released in Bangkok by the Indian Prime Minister Narendra Modi on 2 November 2019. Translated from the English version by M. Rajaram (2009).	
57	Tok Pisin	Subha Sasindran and Sasindran Muthuvel			2023	Complete	Released in Papua New Guinea by Narendra Modi on 21 May 2023.	
58	Tulu	Sayeegeetha and A. Meenakshi	Tirukkur̲aḷ – Translations into Tulu	Chennai (CICT)	2023	Complete	ISBN: 978-81-19249-38-1	
59	Urdu	Hasarat Surawathi	Kural in Urdu	New Delhi (Sahitya Akademi)	1966	Prose	Translated from an English translation.	
59	Urdu	Muhamad Yusuf Kohan	Kural in Urdu and Arabic	Madras	1976			
59	Urdu	Mukhtar Badri	Lafz lafz gohar	Chennai (Nazir Book Depot)	2001	Verse	Translated from the Tamil original.	
59	Urdu	M. B. Amanulla	Tirukkur̲aḷ – Translations into Urdu	Chennai (CICT)	2022	Complete	467 pages; ISBN: 978-93-81744-66-6	
60	Vaagri Booli	Kittu Sironmani						
60	Vaagri Booli	G. Srinivasa Varma	Tirukkur̲aḷ – Translations into Vagri Booli	Chennai (CICT)	2022	Complete	390 pages; ISBN: 978-93-81744-77-2	

== Table of available translations ==
S. No.	Language	Year of first translation	No. of translations available (as of 2024)	No. of complete translations available (as of 2021)
1.	Arabic	1976	6	5
2.	Armenian	1978	1	1
3.	Assamese	2012	2	2
4.	Awadhi	2023	1	1
5.	Badaga	2022	1	1
6.	Bengali	1939	5	4
7.	Bhojpuri	2023	1	1
8.	Bodo	2023	1	1
9.	Burmese	1964	2	2
10.	Chinese	1967	3	2
11.	Creole	2007	3	1
12.	Czech	1952	1	0
13.	Danish	2021	2	2
14.	Dogri		1	
15.	Dutch	1964	1	0
16.	English	1794	143	32
17.	Fijian	1964	2	
18.	Finnish	1972	2	0
19.	French	1767	19	
20.	Garo	2000	1	
21.	German	1803	8	
22.	Gujarati	1931	3	1
23.	Hindi	1924	21	
24.	Indonesian		3	1
25.	Irish		1	
26.	Italian	1985	1	1
27.	Japanese	1981	2	
28.	Kannada	1940	9	
29.	Kashmiri		1	
30.	Khmer		1	
31.	Kodava		1	
32.	Konkani	2002	3	1
33.	Korean	1981	2	1
34.	Koraga		1	
35.	Latin	1730	5	1
36.	Malay	1964	6	
37.	Malayalam	1595	24	
38.	Marathi	1930	3	2
39.	Maithili	2017	1	1
40.	Meitei	2012	1	1
41.	Nepali		1	
42.	Norwegian	2017	1	1
43.	Odia	1978	7	5
44.	Polish	1958	2	
45.	Punjabi	1983	2	
46.	Persian		1	
47.	Rajasthani	1982	1	
48.	Russian	1963	5	2
49.	Sanskrit	1922	10	
50.	Santali		1	0
51.	Saurashtra	1980	2	1
52.	Sinhalese	1961	2	
53.	Spanish		1	
54.	Swedish	1971	1	
55.	Telugu	1877	19	
56.	Thai	2019	1	1
57.	Tok Pisin	2023	1	
58.	Tulu		1	
59.	Urdu	1965	4	
60.	Vaagri Booli		2	

== See also ==
- Tirukkural translations into English
- List of translators
