= Gananath Das =

Indian author

Gananath Das, also known as G. N. Das, is an Indian author and translator from the state of Odisha. After his retirement in 1972 from the Indian Administrative Service, his focus turned to studying various saint poets of India such as Kabir Das, Guru Nanak, and Valluvar and translating their works into Odia and English.

== Career ==
Gananath Das began his career as an Indian Administrative Service officer and retired in 1972.

== Literary works ==
After his retirement, Das started studying various saint poets starting with Kabir Das of the 15th century CE. He began writing about the life and philosophy of Kabir Das in Odia and translated 500 of his couplets into English in verse form and published them in three volumes. The first volume containing 100 couplets was published in 1992, which was published by the Bharatiya Vidya Bhavan of Bombay. The second of containing 300 couplets was published in 1991 by Motilal Banarsidass of Delhi. The third volume contained 100 couplets and was published in 1992 by Writers Workshop of Calcutta, which also published Das's Sayings of Kabir in 1993.

In 1992, Das published his translation of 100 songs of Guru Nanak in Odia under the title Nanak Satak and 100 love poetry of Kabir Das in English in verse form. These were published by Abhinav Publications of New Delhi.

In 1994, Das translated the entire work of the Kural into Odia in verse. His translation of the Kural text is based on the Hindi translation by M. G. Venkatakrishnan and is also influenced by the English translations by P. S. Sundaram and Drew–Lazarus and Sanskrit translation by S. N. Srirama Desikan. The same year, Das also published his Essays on Kabir, which contained about 22 topics from the works of Kabir. Das also did an English translation in verse of more than 150 sayings of Vyasa from the Bhagavata Purana and published it under the title Readings from Bhagabata and an Odia translation in verse of poet-saint Jagannath Das.

== See also ==
- Odia literature
- List of translators
- Tirukkural translations into Odia
