= Tirukkural translations into German =

Among the European languages, German has the third highest number of translations of the Tirukkural, after English and French. As of 2015, there were at least eight translations of the Kural text available in German.

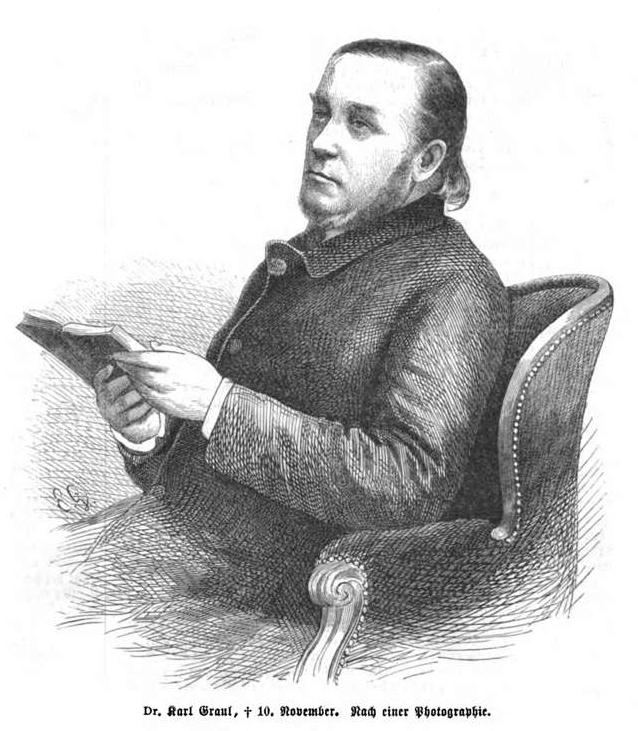
Karl Graul

== History ==
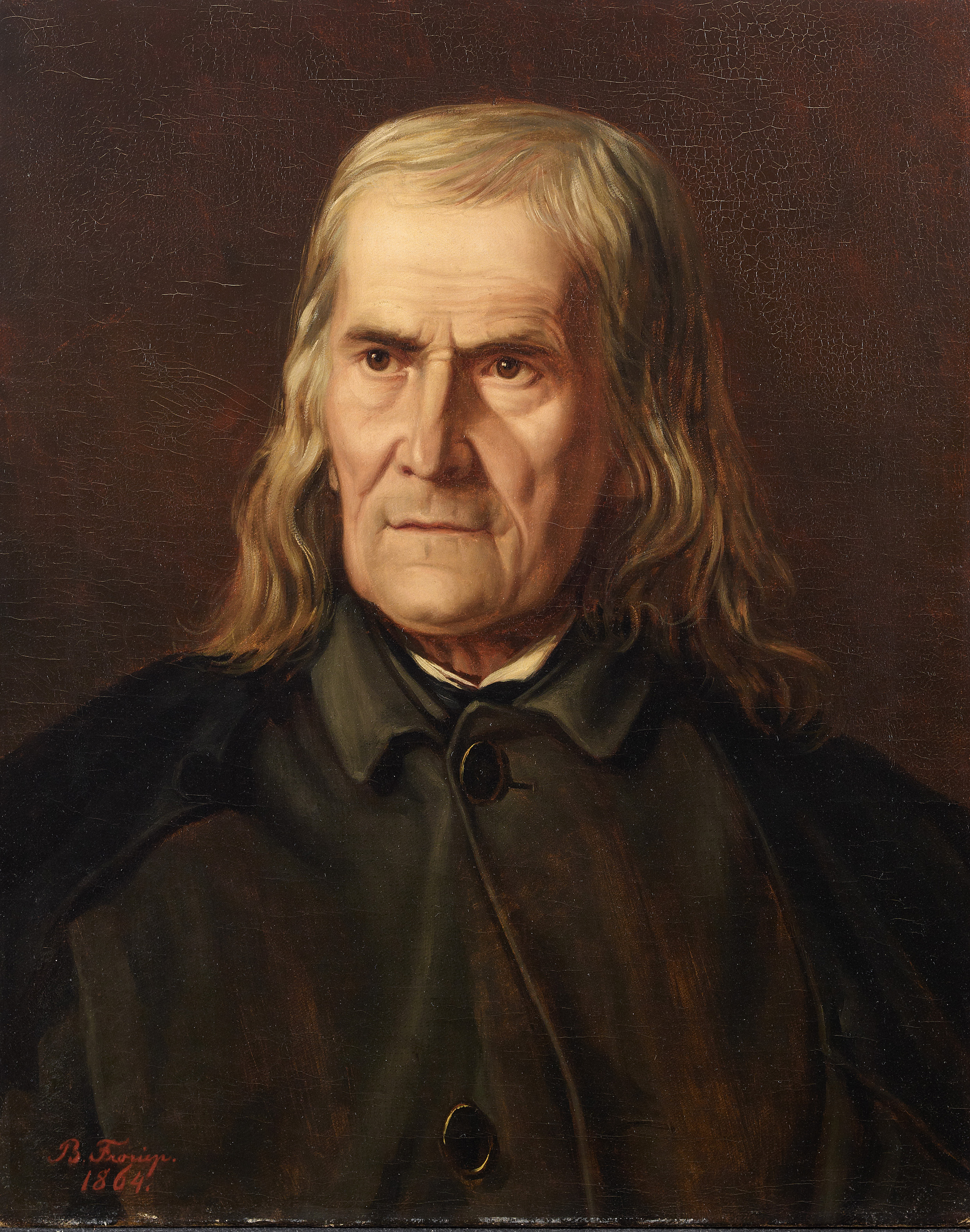
Friedrich Rückert

The first translations of the Kural text into German were made by August Friedrich Caemmerer in 1803 and by Friedrich Rückert in 1847. However, these remained incomplete. Caemmerer translated only the first two books, viz. the Book of Virtue and the Book of Wealth. The first well-known complete German translation was made by Karl Graul in 1856. It is said that when a Kural couplet was explained in English to Graul, (Note: According to S. Maharajan, it was couplet 1091 from the Third Book of the Kural that was explained to Graul: "Two are the looks the in-drinking eyes of this maid have— the one that makes you ill and the other that cures you.") he was so much taken up with it and started learning the Tamil language in order to study the Kural in the original. Graul published his translation in 220 pages under the title Der Kural des Tiruvalluver. Ein gnomisches Gedicht über die drei Strebeziele des Menschen as the third volume of the four-volume work Bibliotheca Tamulica sive Opera Praecipia Tamuliensium. Graul's translation is considered a scholarly one by various scholars including Kamil Zvelebil, who in 1962 praised the translation thus: "As far as I know, the two best translations of Tirukkural had been till this day, Graul’s old German version … and V. V. S. Iyer’s (translation in English)." Speaking about the Kural in his introduction, Graul said, "No translation can convey any idea of its charming effect. It is truly an apple of gold in a network of silver." The nineteenth century witnessed one more translation by Albrecht Frenz and K. Lalithambal in 1877 (titled Thirukural von Thiruvalluvar aus dem Tamil). It was published in Madurai.

== Comparison of translations ==
Translation	Kapitel 26, Vermeide das Essen von Fleisch	
Translation	Kural 254 (Couplet 26:4)	Kural 258 (Couplet 26:8)
Karl Graul, 1856	Was ist Huld und ihr Gegentheil? Tödten und Nichttödten. Unrecht ist’s auch jenes Fleisch zu essen.	Die Weisen, die der Leidenschaft den Rücken kehrten, essen nicht den Leib, der dem Leben den Rücken kehrte.
Albrecht Frenz and K. Lalithambal, 1877	Fragt man, was Gnade ist: Nicht töten – Fleisch essen ist ebensowenig Gnade wie Töten.	Leute ohne Verblendung essen kernen Körper ohne Leben.

== Impact ==
Russian pacifist Leo Tolstoy's concept of non-violence or ahimsa is said to have bolstered when he read one of the German translations of the Kural. Tolstoy later instilled the concept in Mahatma Gandhi through his "A Letter to a Hindu" when young Gandhi corresponded with him seeking his advice on the struggle for Indian Independence. Referring to the Kural literature as 'the Hindu Kural' in his correspondence, Tolstoy cited six couplets from the chapter on non-violence. Taking Tolstoy's advice, Gandhi then took to studying the Kural while in prison, which later culminated in Gandhi's various non-violent movements to liberate the nation.

== See also ==
- Tirukkural translations
- List of Tirukkural translations by language

== Sources ==
- Lal, Mohan (1992). Encyclopaedia of Indian Literature: Sasay to Zorgot. New Delhi: Sahitya Akademi. ISBN 978-81-260-1221-3.

== Published translations ==
- Karl Graul (Trans.). (1856). Der Kural des Tiruvalluver. Ein gnomisches Gedicht über die drei Strebeziele des Menschen. (Bibliotheca Tamulica sive Opera Praecipia Tamuliensium, Volume 3). Leipzig: Dörffling & Franke; London: Williams & Norgate. 220 pages. (Digitalisat)
