= Tirukkural translations into Kannada =

Kannada has at least eight translations of the Tirukkural available as of 2014. Both prose and verse translations have been made in Kannada.

== History of translations ==
The first Kannada translation of the Kural text was made by Rao Bahadur R. Narasimhachar around 1910, who translated select couplets into Kannada. It was published under the title Nitimanjari, in which he had translated 38 chapters from the Kural, including 28 chapters from the Book of Virtue and 10 chapters from the Book of Polity. The second translation was made by B. M. Srikanthaiah in 1940, who published it under the title 'Kural' as part of his anthology, Tamil Kattu (Kannada rendering in verse of various Tamil classical works). Unfortunately, the entire manuscript was destroyed by white ants. The next translation was made by L. Gundappa in 1955, who then translated only the first book of the text, viz., Book of Virtue, and published under the title Tirukkural: Dharma Bhaaga. It was published under the auspices of the Southern Languages Book Trust. In 1960, Gundappa published a complete translated version of the text, covering all the three sections. In 1982, P. S. Srinivas, then head of the Department of Kannada at the Madurai Kamaraj University, published the entire work in prose along with the original Tamil text. The next translation was by N. Munusamy, which was published in 1985. In 2001, K. Jayaraman translated the work in prose, which was published by Bharati Publications, Mysore. In 2014, another translation of the text was completed by S. Srinivasan, which was published by the Central Institute of Classical Tamil (CICT) in Chennai. The translation was part of CICT's project of translating the Kural into multiple languages including Telugu, Manipuri, Nepali, Punjabi and other Indian languages.

== Translations ==
Translation	Chapter 26, ಮಾಂಸ ಉಣದಿರುವುದು/ಮಾಂಸ ತ್ಯಾಜ್ಯ	
Translation	Kural 254 (Couplet 26:4)	Kural 258 (Couplet 26:8)
P. S. Srinivas, 1982	ಕರುಣೆ ಯಾವುದೆಂದರೆ ಒಂದು ಪ್ರಾಣಿಯನ್ನು ಕೊಲ್ಲದಿರುವುದು; ಕರುಣೆಯಲ್ಲದ್ದು ಯಾವುದೆಂದರೆ-ಕೊಲ್ಲುವುದು. ಆ ಕೊಂದ ಒಡಲಿನ ಮಾಂಸವನ್ನು ತಿನ್ನುವುದು ಧರ್ಮವಲ್ಲದ್ದು.	ದೋಷಮುಕ್ತವಾದ ಅರಿವುಳ್ಳವರು ಒಂದು ಪ್ರಾಣಿಯ ಒಡಲಿಂದ ಹರಿದು ಬಂದ ಮಾಂಸವನ್ನು ತಿನ್ನುವುದಿಲ್ಲ.
S. Srinivasan, 2014	ಅಧರ್ಮವೆಂಬರು ಜೀವ ಹತ್ಯೆಯ; ಕೊಲಲಿಲ್ಲವೆಂದು ಪೇಳಿ ಭಕ್ಷಿಸಿಡೆ ಮಾಂಸವ ಮೇಲೂ ಅಧರ್ಮವಲ್ಲವೆ.	ಪಿರಿಯ ಉಣರೆಂದೂ ಅರಿತಿರೆ ಅದು ತಲೆ ತೆಗೆದ ಕುರಿಯ ಅಂಶವೆಂದು.

== See also ==
- Tirukkural translations
- List of Tirukkural translations by language

== Published Translations ==
- S. Srinivasan (Trans.). (2014). Tirukkural in Kannada. Chennai: Central Institute of Classical Tamil. xxiv, 410 pages. ISBN 978-93-81744-05-5
