= Tirukkural translations into Urdu =

As of 2015, Urdu has at least two translations available of the Tirukkural.

== Background ==
The first Urdu translation of the Kural text was by Hazrat Suhrawardy, a professor of Urdu Department of Jamal Mohammad College, Tiruchirappalli. It was published by Sahitya Academy in 1965, with a reprint in 1994. The translation is in prose and is not a direct translation from Tamil but based on English translations of the original. According to the then Special Additional Secretary to Government of Tamil Nadu, H. K. Ghazi, I.A.S., "His [Suhrawardy's] is a fine piece of work in chaste Urdu. Apart from its own literary merit, the work is faithful to the original."

The second translation was made in verse by poet Mukhtar Badri in 2001 and was published in Chennai under the title Lafz lafz gohar. Some sources claim that a second translation was that by Muhammad Yousuf Kokan in 1976. However, it is the first Arabic translation of the Kural text.

In 2022, as part of its Ancient Tamil Classics in Translations series, the Central Institute of Classical Tamil (CICT) in Chennai released its Urdu translation of the Kural by M. B. Amanulla.

== See also ==
- Tirukkural translations
- List of Tirukkural translations by language

== Bibliography ==
- Ghazi, H. K. (1973). Tirukkural – Some parallels in Urdu poetry. In: First All India Tirukkural Seminar Papers 1972. University of Madras. Pp. 87–96.
