= Tirukkural translations into Marathi =

As of 2023, Marathi has at least three translation available of the Tirukkural, of which two are complete.

== History of translations ==
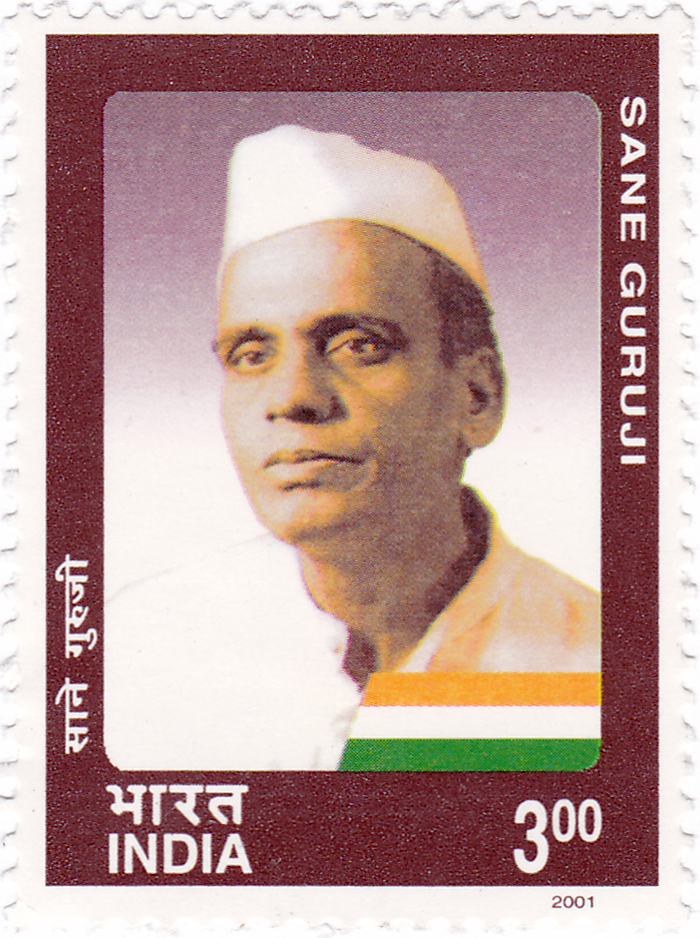
Pandurang Sadashiv Sane

The Kural text was translated into Marathi by the Marathi author Pandurang Sadashiv Sane, widely known as Sane Guruji, in 1930. He made the translation while undergoing imprisonment as a political prisoner in the Tiruchirapalli jail. At the prison, he started learning Tamil and studied the Kural and was tempted to translate the work into Marathi. He referred to the works on the Kural by V. V. S. Aiyar and also consulted with fellow Tamil inmates at the prison to get the full import of subtle ideas in the work. Although completed by 1930, only an unofficial print appeared on 17 December 1930 as Sane Guruji was still serving his prison sentence. When he was released from prison in 1948, Sane Guruji started his own press named "Sadhana Prakashan" and the translation was officially published on 28 September 1948 under the title Kural: Theen Purushartha. The second edition was published in 1960. Reprints appeared in 1960 and 1975, by Continental Prakashan, and again in 1987. The Marathi translation by Sane Guruji is a complete translation.

In the meantime, Narayana Govindarao Peshwe and Ganpath Govindarao Peshwe, a lawyer duo from Thulajapur, translated a Hindi translation of the Kural text by Kshemananda into Marathi and published it in the journal Lokamitra from July 1929 to June 1930. However, they translated only the first 89 chapters of the Kural literature because the Hindi translation itself was incomplete and did not contain Book III of the Kural. In May 1930, this translation was published as a book by T. K. Sadekar from his publishing house named Dhananjay Press in Belgaum, Karnataka. Although the said Hindi translation was based on V. V. S. Aiyar's English translation, which Kshemananda claimed that the translation was cross-checked against the Tamil original by a Tamil scholar before publication, the Marathi translation by Peshwe brothers was not cross-checked against the Kural's original version in Tamil. Both Sane Guruji and Peshwe Brothers' translations were in prose.

Although many scholars before him refrained from translating the third book of the Kural (Book of Love), Sane Guruji translated the whole work. In his work, he described about his decision to do so, thus:

The translation of this book is available in Hindi with the name of 'Tamil Veda, but it includes only two sections: 'Dharma' (Arattuppal) and 'Artha' (Porutpal). The third section discussing 'Kama' (Kamattuppal) has been dropped. Actually in this section there is nothing which can be said to be obscene or vulgar. It is a very fine section. I have translated that section in full.

In 1977, the Maharashtra State Literature and Cultural Board published another Marathi translation done by Purushottam Dinkar Joshi, a scholar of Marathi language at Government Oriental Manuscripts Library in Chennai. It was published under the title Thiruvalluvar Virchit Tirukkural.

In 2022, as part of its Ancient Tamil Classics in Translations series, the Central Institute of Classical Tamil (CICT) in Chennai released its Marathi translation of the Kural by N. Lalitha.

== Translations ==
Translation	Chapter 26, सर्ग २६: मांसाशन नको	
Translation	Kural 254 (Couplet 26:4)	Kural 258 (Couplet 26:8)
Pandurang Sadashiv Sane (1930)	प्राण्यांची हिंसा करणे म्हणजे खरोखर हृदयाचा निष्ठुरपणा आहे; आणि त्यांचे मांस खाणे म्गणजे तर फारच अन्याय वाटतो.	या मायामय, अज्ञानमय संसाराची बंधने सोडून जे मुक्त झाले, ते हत्या करून कधीही मांसाशन करणार नाहीत.

== See also ==
- Tirukkural translations
- List of Tirukkural translations by language
