= Latin translation =

Latin translation may refer to:

- Bible translations into Latin
- Latin translations of the 12th century
- Tirukkuṟaḷ translations into Latin
- List of Latin translations of modern literature
