= Tirukkural translations into Telugu =

Telugu is one of the Indian languages that has had the earliest Tirukkural translations in modern times. As of 2000, there were at least 14 translations of the Kural text available in Telugu.

== Background ==
With the first translation of the Kural text into Telugu made in 1877, Telugu has seen a series of translations before the turn of the 20th century. The first translation was titled Trivarga Dipika made by Venkatrama Srividyanandaswami of the Kanuparti family, who presented it with elaborate notes. The second translation appeared in 1892 under the title Trivargamu made by Sakkam Narasimhalu Naidu. It was not a complete translation but only select couplets were translated. In 1906, another translation of selections was made by C. Lakshminarayana Sastry. In 1948, Telugu poet P. Sriramulu Reddi, who translated Kambaramayana into Telugu, published a translation of the Kural. In 1954, Challa Radhakrishna Sarma made a translation under the title Tamila Vedamu. Another translation was published in 1955 by Jalayya under the title Nitisudha. In 1966, Sonti Sripati Sastry published a translation titled Sri Padula. In 1986, Gurucharan Dutaluri Jagannadham translated the work in verse. With a translation appearing in 2000, there were about 14 translations available in Telugu.

In 2014, a complete translation was done by Jayaprakash and was published by the Central Institute of Classical Tamil (CICT) in Chennai. The translation was part of CICT's project of translating the Kural into multiple languages including Manipuri, Kannada, Nepali, Punjabi and other Indian languages.

== Translations ==
Translation	Chapter 26, జీవహింస	
Translation	Kural 254 (Couplet 26:4)	Kural 258 (Couplet 26:8)
Gurucharan, 1986	జాలి యనిన ప్రాణి జంపమితొఁబాటు మాంస భక్షణమును మానుటగును.	జీవులందు నెల్ల జీవు డొక్కడె గాన చంపు తినరుదేని సాధు జమలు.
Jayaprakash, 2014	చంపక పోవడం దయాగుణం. చంపడం దయారహితగుణం. కాబట్టి మాంసాహారాన్ని తీనుకోవడం ధర్మంకాదు.	నిష్కల్మష హృదయులు ఒక ప్రాణాన్ని తీసి దాని మాంసాన్ని తినాలని అనుకోరు.

== See also ==
- Tirukkural translations
- List of Tirukkural translations by language

== Published translations ==
- S. Jayaprakash. (2014). Tirukkural in Telugu. Chennai: Central Institute of Classical Tamil. 468 pages. ISBN 9789381744048
