= Tirukkural translations into Sanskrit =

As of 2015, there were at least five Sanskrit translations available of the Tirukkural 724 into Sanskrit

== History of translations ==
Despite its thin popularity as a spoken and colloquial language, Sanskrit is considered divine and a language of revelation by scholars. This resulted in more than five translations available of the Kural text in Sanskrit. Unlike in other languages where maiden attempts of translating the Kural text is widely made in prose, all translations in Sanskrit are made in verse in the form of typical slokas. This is because historically Sanskrit literature has been in verse, for which it has gained renown.

It is believed that in the 18th century, Thyagasamudram Shri Chakrapani Iyer, a relative of the eminent Tamil scholar U. V. Swaminatha Iyer, translated the Kural text into Sanskrit for the first time. Per available records, the Kural was translated into Sanskrit for the first time in 1922 by Appa Vajapeyin. It was published by Gururajachariar under the title Suniti Kusuma Mala at Kumbakonam. The second translation was published in 1937–1940 by Sankara Subramanya Sastri, who published it as "Sugati Ratnaakaraa" in the journal Sahridaya. Another translation was published in verse by an anonymous translator in 1940 (perhaps believed to be Vidya Bhushanam Pandit Shri Govindaraya Shastri, a Jain). It was published in Delhi and contained prose explanation in Hindi.

The fourth translation was made by Kaliyan Ramanuja Jeer in 1956. It was published in Nanguneri. The fifth one was a translation by Sanskrit scholar S. N. Sriramadesikan, which was published in 1961 and in 1978. It was published in Madras by Sarasa Kala Nilayam. Besides translating Tirukkural into Sanskrit, he has translated several other Tamil classics such as Ettuthogai (Eight Anthologies), Pathupāttu (Ten Idylls), Silappadikāram, Thiruppāvai, Kambarāmāyanam, Nāladiyār etc.

The sixth translation was published in 1983 by H. A. Chakrapani Iyer under the title "Tiruvalluvar in Sanskrit". The seventh translation was published in January 2021 by V. Indrajithu. It was a complete translation in verse.

In 2022, as part of its Ancient Tamil Classics in Translations series, the Central Institute of Classical Tamil (CICT) in Chennai released its Sanskrit translation of the Kural by S. Rajagopalan.

== Translations ==
Translation	Chapter 26, माँसवर्जनम्	
Translation	Kural 254 (Couplet 26:4)	Kural 258 (Couplet 26:8)
S. N. Srirama Desikan, 1961	अहिंसैव दया प्रोक्ता हिंसेयमदया मता। प्राणिभांसाशनं लोके पापमाख्यायते॥	निर्दुष्टज्ञान सम्पन्नास्त्रिदोषण विवर्जिता:। शरीरं प्राणरहितं शवं मत्वा न भुञ्जते॥
V. Indrajithu, 2021	अहिंसा परमो धर्मो हिंसा तथैव पातकम्। पिशितखादनं पापं तदपि धर्मवर्जितम्॥	नष्टमोहाः विशारदाः सज्जनास्तत्वदर्शिनः। पिशितं नष्टजीवानां जन्तूनां नैव बुञ्जते॥

== See also ==
- Tirukkural translations
- List of Tirukkural translations by language
