= Tirukkural translations into Arabic =

As of 2024, there were at least five translations of the Tirukkural available in Arabic. The Kural text is the first, and so far the only, Tamil work to be translated directly into Arabic. It is also the first Tamil work to be released in the Arabian soil.

== History of translations ==
The first translation of the Kural text was made by Muhammad Yousuf Kokan, the then professor and head of the Department of Arabic, Persian and Urdu of Jamalia Arabic College, Chennai. He made the prose translation from an English translation of the original work and published it around 1976 and 1980 under the title "Sacred Verses" (الابيات المقدسة), which is almost a literal translation of the word Tirukkural. The word Kural actually means "couplet" and not "verse".

The second Arabic translation, and the first by a native speaker, was completed by Amar Hasan from Syria in 2015. The work is not a literal translation and maintains the original verse form completed in full for all the 1330 couplets of the Kural text. Meanwhile in 2014, Central Institute of Classical Tamil in Chennai published a complete translation by Basheer Ahmed Jamali. There is also another translation by Mahmood Fat-hi Sa’d Khalifa, which was published by an Egyptian publisher.

In 2014, K. M. A. Ahamed Zubair made a partial translations of about 50 couplets, including the chapters on Glory of Rain (couplets 11 to 20), Speaking Pleasantly (couplets 91 to 100), Learning (couplets 391 to 400), Embracing the Kin (couplets 521 to 530), and In Praise of Love (couplets 1121 to 1130), which were published in his book on translating Tamil poetry into Arabic with special reference to Thirukkural, published in 2017.

A. Jahir Hussain, an assistant professor in the Department of Arabic, Persian and Urdu at the University of Madras, made a complete translation, who presented it at the Kuwait International Book Fair on 30 November 2019. In March 2015, the translation was presented at the four-day Arab International Poet's Conference organised by Society for Culture and Art, affiliated to Saudi Ministry of Culture, held at Dammam city in Saudi Arabia after being vetted by the Ministry of Culture. Beginning in 2011 as a Tamil Nadu state government project and completed in 2013, the translation was published by the International Institute of Tamil Studies and officially released on 4 September 2020. Unlike Kokan, Hussain made his translation directly from the Tamil original of the Kural text, drawing on Mu. Varadarajan's commentary.

In 2024, K. M. A. Ahamed Zubair, associate professor of Arabic at The New College in Chennai, made an Arabic translation of the Kural, namely Al-Abyath Al-Baariza: Thirukkural (الأبيات البارزة :تيركورل). Published by the Shams Publishing Inc. in London, it contains 300 pages with a critical introduction of Thirukkural and Thiruvalluvar in 18 pages. This is a complete translation made from the original Tamil source.

In 2022, as part of its Ancient Tamil Classics in Translations series, the Central Institute of Classical Tamil (CICT) in Chennai released its Arabic translation of the Kural by Basheer Ahmad.

== Translations ==
Translation	Chapter 26, ترك اللحم	
Translation	Kural 254 (Couplet 26:4)	Kural 258 (Couplet 26:8)
Muhammad Yousuf Kokan, 1976	ذبح الحيوانات يدل على قسوة قلب الذابح ولكن أكل اللحم يدل على ظلم وجور آكله	إن الذين حرروا أنفسهم من الوهم والجهل لن يأكلوا لحما فصل من جسم الحيوان
Amar Hasan, 2015		
K. M. A. Ahamed Zubair, 2024	ما هو اللطف، وما هو النقيض منه؟ إن القتل هو هذا، وعدم القتل هو ذاك؛ فأكل اللحوم الميتة لا يمكن أبدًا أن يكمل هدفًا مشرفًا.	الأرواح التي تدرك الرؤية النقية والخالية من الشغف، لا تأكل أجساد المخلوقات الحية.

== Published translations ==
- K. M. A. Ahamed Zubair. (2024). Al-Abyath Al-Baariza: Thirukkural (الأبيات البارزة :تيركورل). London: Shams Publishing Inc. ISBN 978-620-3-91339-2 (300 pages).

== See also ==
- Tirukkural translations
