= Tirukkural translations into Assamese =

As of 2024, there were at least two translations of the Tirukkural available in Assamese.

== History of translations ==
The Kural text was translated into Assamese for the first time in 2012 by Malini Goswami, former vice-chancellor of Gauhati University. This was published by the Assam Publication Board in Guwahati. However, the first attempt to translate the text was initiated more than a decade earlier by former President of India A. P. J. Abdul Kalam. When his book Wings of Fire was translated into Assamese by Suresh Sharma, Kalam requested Sharma to translate the Kural into Assamese. However, the attempt did not come to fruition.

Within a few years following Goswami's translation, another translation was initiated by the Central Institute of Classical Tamil (CICT). The second translation was made by B. Vijayakumar, which was published by the CICT in 2023. This translation was released by Indian Prime Minister Narendra Modi in December 2023.

== See also ==
- Tirukkural translations
