= Tirukkural translations into Malay =

Translations of the Tirukkural into Malay

As of 2024, Malay has at least seven translations available of the Tirukkural.

== History of translations ==
In 1964, Ramily Bin Thakir translated the Kural text in verse. In 1967, Hussein Ismail translated the work under the title Thirukural Sastera Kalasik Tamil Yang. In 1978, G. Soosai's translation appeared under the title Thirukkural dalam bahasa Melayu. The fourth translation appeared in 2013 by Singaravelu Sacchidhanandham.

In 2023, as part of its Ancient Tamil Classics in Translations series, the Central Institute of Classical Tamil (CICT) in Chennai released its Malay translation of the Kural by Arulselvan Raju.

== Translations ==
Translation	Chapter 26 (Bab 26), Menjahui Daging	
Translation	Kural 254 (Couplet 26:4)	Kural 258 (Couplet 26:8)
G. Soosai	Hati kejam membunuh binatang Insan daging keabaiban jalang.	Terbebas khayalan serta kejahilan Tidak menikmati daging kematian.

== See also ==
- Tirukkural translations
- List of Tirukkural translations by language
