= Tirukkural translations into Fijian =

As of 2024, Fijian had at least two translations available of the Tirukkural.

== History of translations ==
There are at least two translations known of the Kural text in the Fijian language. The first Fijian translation of the Kural was made by Samuel L. Berwick who translated it in 1964. Swami Rudrananda, who established the Ramakrishna Mission in Fiji in 1953, requested Berwick, then editor of the Fijian section of his newspaper Pacific Review (Vakalewa ni Pasifika) published from Nadi, to work on the translation in 1962 to mark the birth centenary of Swami Vivekananda. It was published in Nadi, Fiji under the title Na Tirukurala. This has long been out of print and is now said to be available only in National Archives of Fiji.

The second one was by the Irish-English linguist Paul Geraghty, based at the University of the South Pacific in Suva, Fiji. Not knowing Tamil, he made the Fijian translation from English and French translations of the Kural text in two years. It was published under the title Tirukurali Na sere tabu in 2008, which was released by former Vice President of Fiji Ratu Joni Madraiwiwi.

== Translations ==
| Translation | Chapter 26, Tabu lewenimanumanu | |
| Translation | Kural 254 (Couplet 26:4) | Kural 258 (Couplet 26:8) |
|---|---|---|
| Samuel L. Berwick, 1964 | Na veivakamatei na tawa loloma Vakamatei me kanii kua e tokona. | Ke da rai yawa ka savasava Lewe ni manumanu ’da na tawa sagaa. |
| Paul Geraghty, 2008 | Na laba na ivalavalaca; e ivalavalaca tale ga na kania na lewe ni manumanu labati. | Koya e cecere nona vakasama ena sega ni kana lewenimanumanu, ni dau rawa ga ena kena kau tani na bula ni manumanu. |

== Published translations ==
- S. L. Berwick (1964). Na Tirukurala. Nadi: Sri Ramakrishna Mission.
- Paul Geraghty (2008). Fijian Tirukkurali: Na sere tabu. Suva: Reddy Group of Companies. ISBN 978-982-98034-1-2.

== See also ==
- Tirukkural translations
- List of Tirukkural translations by language
