= Tirukkural translations into Czech =

As of 2015, Tirukkural has been translated into Czech only once.

== History of translations ==
The only known translation of the Kural text in Czech is some selections that appeared in Novy Orient, a Czech journal from Prague, during 1952–54. These were translated by Tamil scholar Kamil Zvelebil.

== Translations ==
Translation	Kural, couplet or verse, No. 423 (Chapter 43)
Kamil Zvelebil, 1952	Značka moudrosti má poznat pravdu Od kteréhokoliv zdroje to je slyšeno.

== See also ==
- Tirukkural translations
