= Tirukkural translations into Chinese =

As of 2015, the Chinese language had two translations available of the Tirukkural.

== History of translations ==
The first Chinese translation of the Kural text was made by Che'ng Hsi in 1967, published by the Department of Indian Studies, University of Malaya and printed at the Hong Kong University Press. The Nattukottai Chettiars Endowment Fund, which has also provided a Malay translation, funded the first Chinese translation.

The second translation was made by Yu Hsi in 2014, which is a complete translation made in Mandarin. It was first published in Taipei, Taiwan by Poem Culture Corp. The translation was released by former President of India A. P. J. Abdul Kalam. It was reprinted in India in 2014 by the Department of Tamil Development and Culture in the Tamil Nadu state. Yu Hsi's translation had earlier appeared as a Taiwan publication in 2010.

In addition, Parthasarathy et al. also list D. S. Rajan as the third translator of the Kural text into Chinese. However, the translation remains unpublished and he is said to have translated only 60 couplets in all.

== Translations ==
Translation	Kural, Chapter 26 (禁食肉)		
Translation	Chapter Title	Kural 254 (Couplet 26:4)	Kural 258 (Couplet 26:8)
Che'ng Hsi, 1967	禁食肉	如果你问："什么是仁慈？什么是冷酷？" 那是不杀和杀，因此，食肉永远不可能圣洁。	
Yu Hsi, 2014	素食主義	慈悲是不殺生，洗心革面； 殺生為食則是無益的罪惡。	智者不以肉類為食， 因為它不過是腐屍。

== Similarities with Confucian thoughts ==
The Kural text (called Tirukkural, meaning "Sacred Verses") and the Confucian sayings recorded in the classic Analects of Chinese (called Lun Yu, meaning "Sacred Sayings") resemble each other in many ways. Both Valluvar and Confucius focused on the behaviors and moral conducts of a common person. Similar to Valluvar, Confucius advocated legal justice embracing human principles, courtesy, and filial piety, besides the virtues of benevolence, righteousness, loyalty and trustworthiness as foundations of life. Incidentally, Valluvar differed from Confucius in two respects. Firstly, unlike Confucius, Valluvar was also a poet. Secondly, Confucius did not deal with the subject of conjugal love, for which Valluvar devoted an entire division in his work.

== See also ==
- Tirukkural translations
