= Tirukkuṟaḷ translations into Latin =

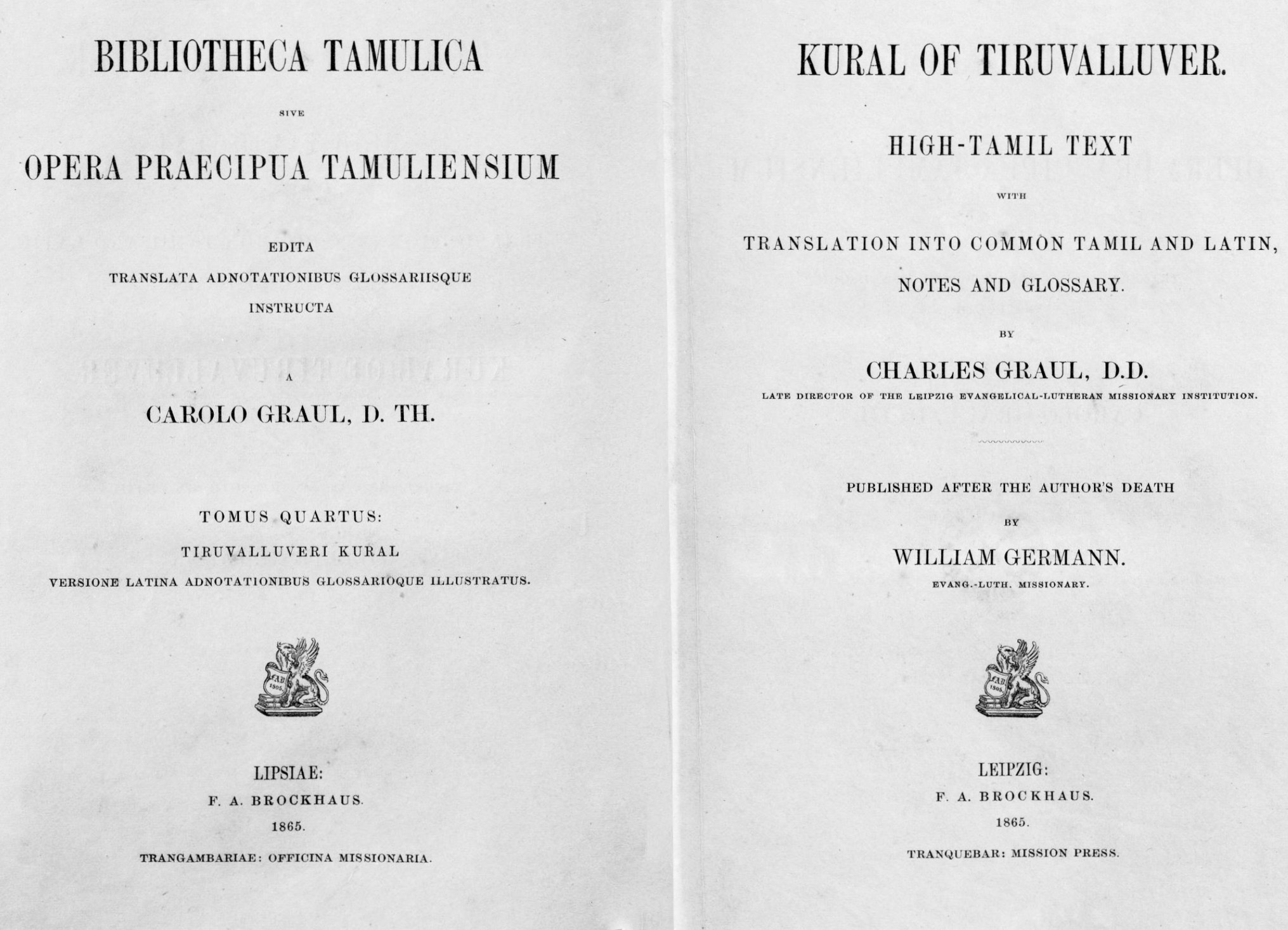
1856 CE Latin translation of Tirukkural by Karl Graul, with English notes by William Germann.

Latin is the first foreign language into which the Tirukkuṟaḷ was translated. There are three known translations of the Kural text available in Latin.

== History ==
The Christian missionaries who arrived in India during the British era admired the Kural text greatly owing to the moral values found in the work. In 1730, Constantius Joseph Beschi of the Society of Jesus (1700–1742) translated it into Latin, introducing the work to the Europeans for the first time. Beschi, however, translated only the first two parts, namely, virtue and wealth, since he considered translating the section on love inappropriate for a Christian missionary. This manuscript, now found in the India Office Library, London, was edited by George Uglow Pope, who published it as 'notes' at the end of his famous English translation titled The Sacred Kurral in 1886. This saved the manuscript from having been lost in the oblivion. There are at least two more Latin translations of the Kural text available either in full or in parts. In 1856, Karl Graul published the Kural text in German, with later translated it into Latin and simple Tamil in 1865. In 1865, an unknown author made the third Latin translation of the Kural text titled Tiruvalluvar Kural Versione Lationa.

== Translations for comparison ==
Translation	Chapter 26, Abstinentia a carnibus	
Translation	Kural 254 (Couplet 26:4)	Kural 258 (Couplet 26:8)
Constantius Joseph Beschi, 1730	Si quaeras quid sit lenitas, quid ejus contrarium, scito esse haec duo, nempe viventia non mactare, et ea mactare; quapropter virtuosa esse nequit illorum carnium comestio.	Qui scientiam habent ab omni deceptione immunem non vescentur carnibus, quae non sunt nisi cadavera.
Karl Graul, 1856	Quae est benevolentia et quid (vitium ei) contrarium? Non mactare et mactare. Etiam carne illa (mactando comparata) vesci nefas est.	Sapiens, qui a libidine discessit, non vescetur carne, quae a vita discessit.

== Comparison with European literature ==
In his commentary, the Italian Jesuit missionary Fr. Beschi who then translated most of the Kural couplets into Latin, compared the couplets with the maxims of Seneca. Later when George Uglow Pope translated the work into English in 1886, he reprinted Beschi's translations in his work. In his introduction to the English translation, Pope compared the Kural to the Latin elagiac verse, while drawing parallels with the works of Propertius and Martial.

== Criticisms on translations ==
Modern scholars have noticed several mistranslations in the Latin translation by Father Beshi. According to V. Ramasamy, "Beschi is purposely distorting the message of the original when he renders பிறவாழி as ‘the sea of miserable life’ and the phrase பிறவிப்பெருங்கடல் as ‘sea of this birth’ which has been translated by others as ‘the sea of many births’. Beschi means thus ‘those who swim the vast sea of miseries’. The concept of rebirth or many births for the same soul is contrary to Christian principle and belief".

== See also ==
- Tirukkural translations
- List of Tirukkural translations by language

== Published translations ==
- Karl Graul (Trans.). (1865). Kural of Tiruvalluver. High-Tamil Text with Translation into Common Tamil and Latin, Notes and Glossary. (Bibliotheca Tamulica sive Opera Praecipia Tamuliensium, Volume 4). Leipzig: F. A. Brockhaus. 348 pages. (Digitalisat)
