= Tirukkural translations into Russian =

As of 2015, there are at least four translations of the Tirukkural available in Russian.

== History ==
The joint effort of J. J. Glazov and A. Krishnamurthi resulted in the first Russian translation of the Kural text, published in 1963. In 1974, Alif Ibragimov published a translation in Moscow. The English translation of select couplets by C. Rajagopalachari was translated into Russian by D. V. Burba. This contains translation of 555 couplets from the first two books of the Kural text (Virtue and Wealth). In 1990, another translation of the complete text was made by Vithali Furniki, a translator in the Centre of Indian Cultural Studies, Moscow.

== Translations ==
Translation	Chapter 26, Избегать вкушения мяса	
Translation	Kural 254 (Couplet 26:4)	Kural 258 (Couplet 26:8)
J. J. Glazov and A. Krishnamurthi, 1963	Если спросят, что такое сострадание, так ведай: зто неубиение. Убиение — отсутствие сострадания, и что другое грех, как не вкушение мяса.	Обладающий ясным взором и лишенный пороков не пожелает пожирать плоть другого создания, расставшегося с жизнью.
Vithali Furniki, 1990	Если вы спросите себя, что такое добродетель и сострадание, то знайте — это неубиение. Убийство же есть отсутствие сострадания, а грех — вкушение мяса.	У кого ясный взор и отсутствуют пороки, тот не станет поедать плоть другого существа, лишенного жизни ради того, чтобы быть съеденным

== See also ==
- Tirukkural translations
- List of Tirukkural translations by language

== Bibliography ==
- Furniki, V. (1990). Тируккурал. Available from http://www.tirukkural.narod.ru/
- Glazov, J. J. and Krishnamurthi, A. (1963). Thirukural, a Book on Virtue, Politics and Love. Moscow.
