= Tirukkural translations into Korean =

Korean has at least two translations of the Tirukkural available as of 2017.

== History of translations ==
When Shuzo Matsunaga made the first Japanese translation of the Kural text in 1981, he also translated it into Korean, thus making it the first translation of the Kural literature into Korean. In 2015, the then Chief Minister of Tamil Nadu, J. Jayalalithaa, announced the allocation of ₹ 3.6 million towards translating the Kural text into Korean. The translation was released by the Chief Minister of Tamil Nadu K. Palaniswami on 23 May 2017. The first copy of the translation was received by Consul General of the Republic of Korea in Chennai Kim Hyung Tae.

In 2024, another translation of the Kural was made by P. Sahaya Darcius, a philosophy student and the secretary of the Korea Tamil Sangam (KTS) in South Korea, who has also translated the Manimekalai into Korean.

== Translations ==
Translation	Chapter 26, 육식을 피함	
Translation	Kural 254 (Couplet 26:4)	Kural 258 (Couplet 26:8)
2017	생물을 죽이지 않는 것은 친절함의 행위이다. 살육하고 그 고기를 먹는 것은 불친절함이다.	맑은 정신을 가진 현명한 사람은 죽은 동물의 고기를 먹는 것을 삼가하리라.

== See also ==
- Tirukkural translations
- List of Tirukkural translations by language
