= Tirukkural translations into Dutch =

As of 2015, Tirukkural has been translated into Dutch only once.

== History of translations ==
Selections of Tirukkural couplets were translated into the Dutch language by D. Kat in 1964. This is the only Dutch translation of the Kural text known thus far. As of 2024, the work is said to be out of print.

== Translations ==
| Translation | Kural, couplet or verse, No. 315 (Chapter 32, Niet kwaad doen) |
|---|---|
| D. Kat, 1964 | Wat heb je aan kennis als het je er niet toe brengt de pijn van anderen te voorkomen, als was het je eigen pijn? |

== See also ==
- Tirukkural translations
