= Tirukkural translations into Sinhalese =

As of 2015, the Tirukkuṟaḷ has been translated into Sinhalese at least twice.

== Background ==
The first Sinhalese translation of the Tirukkuṟaḷ was made by Govokgada Misihamy, with the assistance of S. Thambaiah, in 1961 under the title Thiruvalluvar's Kural. Mishamy considered his work an 'adaptation' rather than a translation, as he believed that no translation of a classic into a foreign language could do justice to the original.

Another translation of the Kural text was made by Charles De Silva in 1964, and was published by the Sri Lanka Sahitya Mandalaya.

== Translations ==
Translation	Chapter 26, මස් කෑමෙන් වැළකීම	
Translation	Kural 254 (Couplet 26:4)	Kural 258 (Couplet 26:8)
Govokgada Misihamy, 1961	කූළුණ සහනු කූළුණ - පර පණ රැකූම නැසුමයි එහෙයින් පණ නැසුව - සිරුරෙ මස් කෑම අදහම් වේ.	වරදින් මිදි ඇති - පැහැදිලි දැනුම් ඇත්තෝ අනෙකකූගේ සිරුරේ - මසක් නුබුදිති කිසිම ලෙසකින්.

== See also ==
- Tirukkural translations
- List of Tirukkural translations by language
