= Tirukkural translations into Rajasthani =

As of 2015, Tirukkural has been translated into Rajasthani only once.

== Background ==
In 1982, the Kural text was translated into Rajasthani by Kamala Gurg. Titled Tirukkural Needhi Sastra, this was published in Jaipur. This remains the sole translation of the Kural text into Rajasthani.

== See also ==
- Tirukkural translations
