= Tirukkural translations into Bengali =

As of 2015, there were at least four translations of the Tirukkural available in Bengali.

== History of translations ==
The first Bengali translation was made in prose by Nalini Mohan Sanyal in 1939. It was published by Bangiya Sahitya Parishad, with a foreword by the eminent Bengali Scholar Suniti Kumar Chatterjee. However, the work is presently out of print, with the only copy available at the National Library in Kolkata. The second translation was by E. C. Sastri in 1974. The third translation appeared in 1993 by N. Ramanuja Das, which was published in Khardah in West Bengal. The second and third translations too were made in prose. There appears to be another translation by T. N. Senapathy, the details of which are not known. The first verse translation was made by Subramaniyan Krishnamoorthy, which was published in New Delhi by Sahitya Akademi. Krishnamoorthy has also translated Cilappadikaaram into English published by M. P. Birla Foundation, Kolkata.

== Published translations ==
- Tirukkural (Ancient Tamil Poetry). Vol. 1. New Delhi: Sahitya Academi. 2014. p. 148. ISBN 978-81-260-4719-2.

== See also ==
- Tirukkural translations
