= Soibam Rebika Devi =

Indian translator (born 1976)

- Born: 1976 (age 49–50); Imphal, Manipur, India
- Occupations: Teacher, translator
- Known for: First translator of the Tirukkural into Meitei

Soibam Rebika Devi (born 1976) is an Indian translator who is best known for translating the Tirukkural into Meitei.

== Biography ==
Soibam Rebika Devi was born in 1976 in Imphal, Manipur. She studied botany, obtaining her bachelor's degree in 1998 and master's degree in 2002 from the Manipur University. In 2004–2005, she pursued a ten-month diploma course in Tamil language at the Southern Regional Language Centre of the Central Institute of Indian Languages, Mysore. She received her master of arts in linguistics in 2007 and master of arts in translation studies in 2010 from the Annamalai University. She received her doctorate in linguistics from the Madurai Kamaraj University. She began her career as a high school teacher in Manipur. She is currently working as a resource person in the National Translation Mission, Central Institute of Indian Languages, Ministry of Human Resource Development, Government of India, Manasagangotri, Mysore. She served as a resource person in the preparation of "A Semantically Classified Vocabulary: Tamil–English–Manipuri" and "Editing the manuscripts of Multimedia Materials prepared in twenty Indian languages," and has presented eight research articles. She has conducted a survey on Knowledge Text Scenario in Manipur, participating in workshops organized by National Translation Mission for the translation of Knowledge Texts into Meitei.

In 2012, she completed the first ever translation of the Kural into Meitei, which she made in prose form and was published by the Central Institute of Classical Tamil, Chennai. She took more than a year-and-a-half's time to complete the translation. It is considered the first ever translation of a Tamil work into the Meitei language. The translation was published by the Central Institute of Classical Tamil (CICT), Chennai in 2012. The translation was part of CICT's project of translating the Kural into multiple languages including Telugu, Kannada, Nepali, Punjabi and other Indian languages. The translation was officially released in Imphal in March 2014 by the governor of Manipur.

In November 2014, the CICT planned to recite the Meitei translation along with translations in 9 other languages to commemorate the launch of the institution's Telugu and Kannada translations of the Kural text.

== See also ==
- Tirukkural translations
- Tirukkural translations into Meitei
- Tamil literature
- Meitei literature
- List of translators
