= Tirukkural translations into Polish =

As of 2015, there are at least two translations of the Tirukkural available in the Polish language.

== History of translations ==
The first Polish translation of the Kural text was made in prose in 1958 by Umadevi and Wandy Dynowskiej, published by the Indo-Polish Library (Biblioteka Polsko-Indyjska). With 141 pages, it was only a partial translation. During the same year, a parallel edition by the same translator appeared in Poland. A verse translation was made by Bohdan Gębarski, published in 1977 under the title Tirukkural. Święta księga południowych Indii. It is a complete translation. It was published again in 1998.

== Translations ==
Translation	Chapter 26, O Mięsożerstwie	
Translation	Kural 254 (Couplet 26:4)	Kural 258 (Couplet 26:8)
Bohdan Gębarski, 1977	Wiele człowiek ma cech drapieżnego zwierzęcia, Przecież ubój to też mordowanie.	Niech więc śmierć ta przedwcześnie zwierzęciu zadana Nie obciąża twojego sumienia.

== See also ==
- Tirukkural translations
- List of Tirukkural translations by language

== Bibliography ==
- Gębarski, B. (1998). Tirukkural. Święta księga południowych Indii. Europa. Pp. 152. ISBN 83-85336-54-0. Available from http://wysylkowa.com/ks414573.html
