= L. Gundappa =

Kannada writer

L. Gundappa (1903-1986) was a distinguished professor of Kannada literature at Bangalore University who played a pivotal role in the revival of Kannada literature. Inspired by his mentor, B. M. Srikantaiah, Gundappa made significant contributions to the field, particularly in the areas of translation and promoting world literature to Kannada readers.

Gundappa was an accomplished poet and writer who introduced Kannada readers to world literature by translating classics from ancient Kannada and Classic Tamil to modern Kannada. He translated short stories by Tolstoy from English, and won a gold medal for the translation of a poem by Matthew Arnold (titled Sohrab and Rustum) to Kannada. He worked on the first dictionary from English to Kannada. He wrote a definitive book on the art of translation called Kannadi Seyve (mirroring). He was honored by both the Kannada and Tamil people for his service to literature.

== Early education ==
Gundappa was born on 8 January 1903 in the village of Mathighatta in South India. His early education took place in Belur, Karnataka, where he immersed himself in the study of Sanskrit and the Vedas. By the time he completed his middle school education, Gundappa had already mastered the Sanskrit language. He later moved to Chikmagalur for his high school education, where his talent for composing original devotional poems in Sanskrit caught the attention of Abhinava Vidya Theertha Swami, the religious leader of Sringeri Sharada Peetham. Impressed by Gundappa's work, the Swami pledged to provide a monthly stipend to support Gundappa's college education.

Gundappa pursued his higher education at Mysore Maharaja's College, a hub of intellectual activity focused on India's liberation from British colonial rule. It was during this time that various movements advocating the rediscovery of India's cultural heritage gained momentum.

Gundappa, influenced by his mentor B.M. Sri and other literary giants like T.S. Venkataiah and A.R. Krishnashastry, became deeply committed to reviving Indian culture and literature. As advised by his mentor, Gundappa chose to learn Tamil as part of his master's degree curriculum in languages, aiming to reintroduce the Kannada community to its heritage through meticulous translations of literary works from Sanskrit, Tamil, and English.

== Family life ==
Gundappa was married to Smt. Sharada of Akki Hebbal, and together they had seven children. Gundappa's daughters, Sumitra, Vimala, and Kamala, collectively known as the L.G. sisters, garnered fame for popularizing Kannada folk songs and light songs (Bhava Geethegalu) by contemporary poets like Pu Ti Narasimhachar and Bendre from a young age.

== Awards ==
- B.M. Sri Memorial Gold medal (1930)
- Devaraja Bahaddur Award (1935)
- Tamil Writer's Association award (1956)
- Kannada Sahitya Academy Award (1975)

== Original works of L. Gundappa ==
(Kannada title followed by a translation of the meaning)

- Chataki mattu Itara Kavanagalu - Chataki and other poems – including the children's favorite "Appana jebina duddugalella"
- Kannadi Seve’ – premier book on the art of translation
- Tamilu purathana Kathegalu matthu Hariharan Ragale– the ancient stories of Tamil and the Ragale by Harihara
- Sarvagna and Thiruvalluvar (an essay)
- Kannad Sahitya Chitragalu – Volumes I, II and III (Collections of Essays)
- Natygarthiyaru – The Dancers – Madhavi is Shilappadigaram (Essay)
- Yuddha Siddahte mattu vyuha rachane – Preparation for war (Essay)
- Kavi Vani – The Poet's Message
- Mukunda Mala (interconversions of prose and poetry)
- Avvayyar and other essays
- Bhasa's Karna – an essay on the character "Karna" by the poet Bhasa
- Avvayyar Krutigalu - Avvayyar's works
- Pampa Parichaya – introduction to Pampa (an ancient Kannada writer)
- Pampana Hita Vachanagalu – The Teachings of Pampa
- Kamba Ramayana – The Ramayana by Kamba (Essay)
- Arundhati (An old song)
- Bahubali Chritram – the History of Bahubali (a Jain king and later, a monk)
- Books for which L. Gundappa was Editor/publisher
- Adipuraana Sangraha (Editor) – A book on the history of Jainism and the essence of Jain Religious teaching
- Naada Padagalu (Editor) – songs collected by Matighatta Krishnamurthi
- Nala Charitre – Story of Nala
- Sri Bhagavaccharitre
- Sri Jyothirlinga Swamigala Jeevana Charitre – The Biography of Sri. Jyothirlinga swami
- Srimad Abhinava Vidyathirtha Vijayam - A biography of Sringeri Shankaracharya Sri Abhinava Vidyatirtha

== Sources ==
Articles in Kannada (a South Indian language) newspapers: :Article by Prof. G. Venkatasubbiah in "Kannada Prabha" 5 January 2004; and various authors in Prajavani 4 January 2004 and Vijaya Karnataka Sunday 11 January 2004. These articles were written in Kannada as part of centennial celebrations for L. Gundappa.
