= P. S. Sundaram =

Indian professor

Pazmarneri Subrahmanya Sundaram
- Born: 1910
- Died: 1998 (aged 87–88)
- Occupation: Professor of English
- Known for: Translating Tirukkural into English

P. S. Sundaram (1910–1998), born Pazmarneri Subrahmanya Sundaram, was an Indian professor of English, best known for translating the Tirukkural and various Tamil classics into English. He had degrees in English from the University of Madras and the Oxford University. He served as professor of English for about 40 years in different parts of North India.

== Biography ==
P. S. Sundaram was born into a Tamil-speaking family. In 1930, he obtained a first-class master's degree in English literature from the Presidency College, Chennai. He went to the Oxford University for higher studies and returned to India in 1934, after which he joined the DAV College in Lahore, beginning his decades-long career as a distinguished academic. In 1938, he joined the Ravenshaw College in Cuttack as head of the English department. He went on to become the principal, and in 1953 he became a member of the Orissa Public Service Commission. With his government service ending in 1959, he was forced to seek non-government employment in his mid-forties. He then joined as principal of the Bareilly College and later continued in the same capacity at the Maharani's College in Jaipur until his retirement in 1974.

Retirement gave him the freedom to pursue his passion for classical Tamil literature. Backed by his command in both Tamil and English, he took up the task of translating various Tamil classics. He wrote a biography on the Indian author in English R. K. Narayan and translated the Tamil poet Subramania Bharati into English. In 1987, he privately published an English translation of the Tirukkural. The translation was made in verse and was published under the title Tiruvalluvar The Kural. He then translated the mystical poems of Andal and other Alwars in the Vaishnavite Bhakti tradition. In the final years of his life, he translated the 12,000-odd verses of the Kamba Ramayanam into English.

== Literary works ==
- Tiruvalluvar, The Kural (1987)
- Kamba Ramayana (2002)
- Andal's Thiruppavai and Nachiar Thirumozhi

== See also ==
- Tirukkural translations
- Tirukkural translations into English
- List of translators into English
