= Mathighatta, Hassan =

Village in Karnataka, India

Mathighatta
- Village
- Location within Karnataka Location within India
- Coordinates: 13°14′23″N 76°03′36″E
- Country: India
- State: Karnataka
- District: Hassan
- Taluk: Belur

Government
  - Type: Sarpanch

Area
  - Total: 8.92 km^{2} (3.44 sq mi)
- Elevation: 854 m (2,802 ft)

Population (2011)
  - Total: 2,106
  - Density: 236/km^{2} (611/sq mi)

Language
  - Official: Kannada
- Time zone: UTC+5:30 (IST)
- PIN: 573121
- STD code: 08172
- Vehicle registration: KA-13

Mathighatta is a village in Belur Taluk, Hassan District, Karnataka, India. It is located near the boundary with Chikmagalur District, about 27 kilometres north of the district capital Hassan, and 22 kilometres northeast of the subdistrict capital Belur. In the year 2011, the village had a population of 2,106.

== Geography ==
Mathighatta is situated to the northeast of Dwarasamudra Lake. It covers an area of 892.36 hectares.

== Demographics ==
According to the 2011 Census of India, there were 545 households within Mathighatta. Among the 2,106 residents, 1,035 are male and 1,071 are female. The overall literacy rate was 66.24%, with 765 of the male population and 630 of the female population being literate.
