= S. N. Sriramadesikan =

Indian scholar (1921–2014)

Sirungathur Nadathur Sriramadesikan
- Born: 21 June 1921; Kancheepuram, India
- Died: 17 March 2014 (aged 92); Chennai, India
- Known for: Sanskrit scholar; translating the Kural into Sanskrit and English

S. N. Sriramadesikan (21 June 1921 – 17 March 2014) was an Indian scholar of Sanskrit and Tamil, lecturer, principal, editor and publisher. Among his many works, he is best known for translating the Tirukkural into both Sanskrit and English.

== Biography ==
S. N. Sriramadesikan had a long scholarly career in the fields of language, literature and translation in Sanskrit, Tamil and English. He was appointed by the then Chief Minister of Tamil Nadu M. G. Ramachandran as special officer in the State Government Department of Indian Medicine and Homoeopathy for about 13 years, during which time he worked on his comprehensive and well-researched translation of ancient Ayurveda Sanskrit texts into Tamil. These include translations of 25,000 verses of Ashtanga Sangraham and Charaka Susruta Samhitas running into six volumes of 6,400 pages, which have been prescribed as college textbooks for students of Ayurveda in the country.

When he requested the then President Rajendra Prasad for support to Sanskrit, a Sanskrit Commission was set up, whose recommendations led to the creation of centrally funded and managed Vidya Peetams for Sanskrit learning and research.

During his long career, he served as a research scholar in Sri Venkateswara Oriental Research Institute (1943–1945), as a research officer in Kendriya Sanskrit Vidyapith (1972–1975), as an honorary editor in Saraswati Mahal Library in Thanjavur (1980), and as an honorary adviser for Oriental Manuscript Library, Government of Madras, Chennai (1988).

Sriramadesikan died on 17 March 2014 at the age of 92.

== Awards and honors ==
- 1971: President's Certificate of Honour for Sanskrit Proficiency.
- 1993: Received title of Kalaimamani Award by the Government of Tamil Nadu, which is the highest state honour in the field of Arts.

=== Titles ===
In recognition of his services to Ayurveda, the Kanchi Kamakoti Peetham conferred on him the title, 'Ayurveda Bharati' and Srirangam Srimad Andavan Ashramam the title of 'Abhinava Sushruta Vishruta'.

== Literary works ==
Apart from the classic treatises on Ayurveda, Sriramadesikan has composed in Sanskrit 'Desika Mani Satakam' and 'Krishna Katha Sangraham'. He has also rendered the Tirukkural, Naaladiyar, Pathuppattu, Ettuthogai, Silappadikaram, Avvaiyar's Needi works, and Tiruppavai and the works of Subramaniya Bharati into Sanskrit. He also made the well-annotated translation of Bharata's Natya Shastra from the Sanskrit original of 6,000 verses.

Below is a list of literary works of Sriramadesikan:

- Avvaiyar Niti (Sanskrit translation)
- Susruta Samhita (Tamil translation of Sanskrit Ayurveda text)
- Bharatanatya Sastram—Tracing the History
- Bharatiar Works
- Ettu Thogai (Sanskrit translation)
- Sanga Noolgalil Vaidika Kalacharam (research work)
- Kambaramayanam (Balakandam, Sanskrit translation)
- Naaladiyar (Sanskrit translation with Tamil and English expositions)
- Pathupattu (Sanskrit translation)
- Silappadikaram (Pukar Kandam, Sanskrit )
- Tirukkural (two volumes of Sanskrit translation with Tamil and English expositions)
- Tiruppavai (Sanskrit translation)
- Vemana Padaya (Sanskrit and Tamil translations)

== See also ==
- Tirukkural translations
- Tirukkural translations into English
- List of translators into English
