= August Friedrich Caemmerer =

- Born: 1767
- Died: 1837 (aged 69–70)
- Occupation: Missionary

August Friedrich Caemmerer (1767–1837) was a Danish missionary in South India. He is known as the first translator of the Kural into German.

== Biography ==
August Friedrich Caemmerer arrived in Tranquebar on 14 May 1791 as part of the Danish-Halle Mission, better known as the Tranquebar Mission. He translated the first two book of the Kural into German and published it in 1803. He died in 1837 as the last missionary of the Tranquebar Mission.

== See also ==
- List of translators
