= Kamil Zvelebil =

Czech philologist (1927–2009)

Kamil Václav Zvelebil
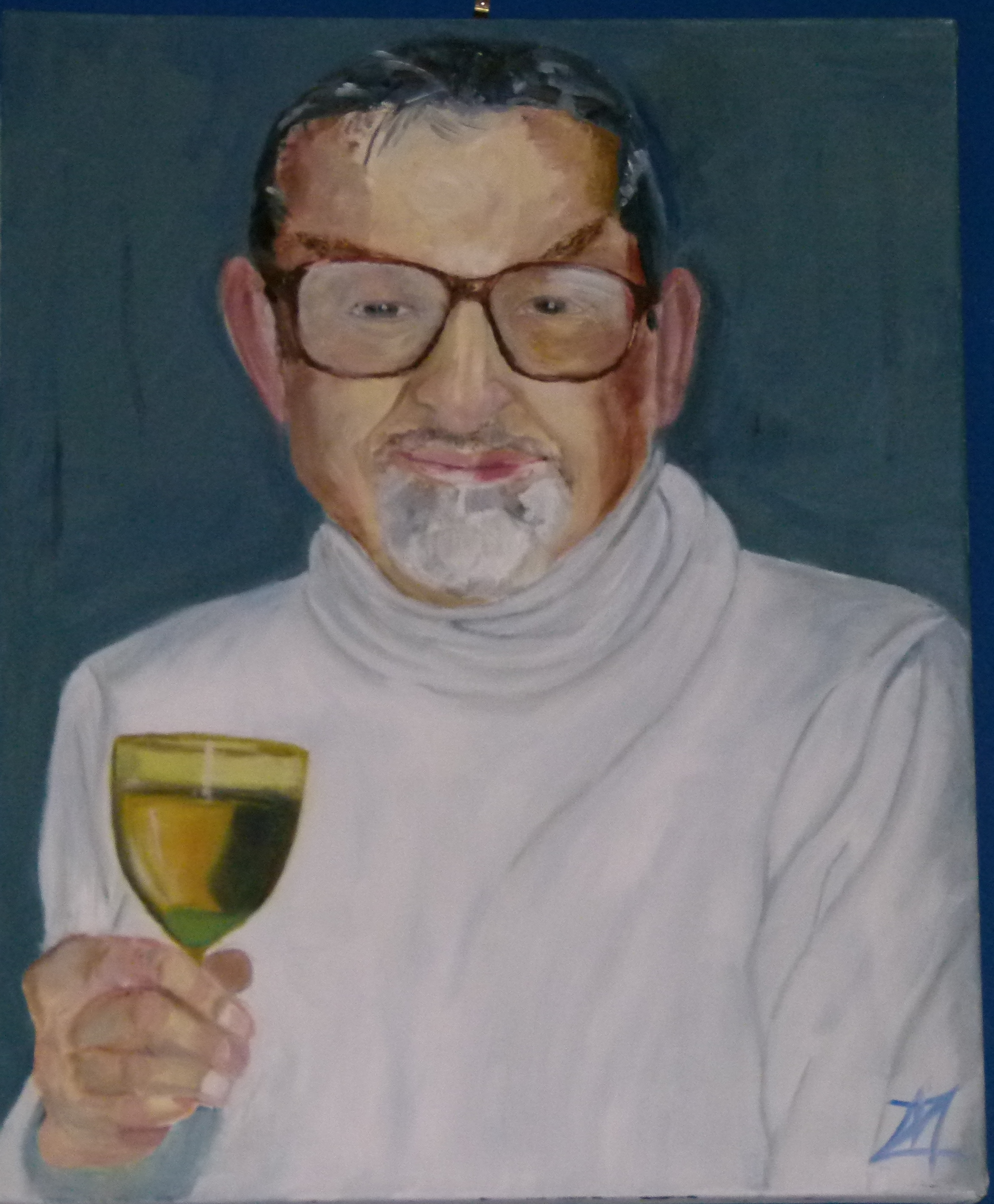
- Born: November 17, 1927; Prague, Czechoslovakia
- Died: January 17, 2009 (aged 81)
- Education: Charles University
- Awards: Czech Union of Writers; Sahitya Akademi
- Scientific career
- Institutions: Oriental Institute of the Academy of Sciences of the Czech Republic; University of Chicago; University of Heidelberg; Charles University; Collège de France; University of Leiden; University of Utrecht

Kamil Václav Zvelebil (November 17, 1927 – January 17, 2009) was a Czech scholar in Indian literature and linguistics, notably Tamil, Sanskrit, Dravidian linguistics and literature and philology.

== Life and career ==
Zvelebil studied at the Charles University in Prague from 1946 to 1952 where he majored in Indology, English, literature and philosophy. After obtaining his PhD in 1952 and until 1970 he was a senior research fellow in Tamil and Dravidian linguistics and literature at the Oriental Institute of the Czechoslovak Academy of Sciences. He held the role of associate professor of Tamil and Dravidian at Charles University in Prague until 1968, when he and his family (including his son, the later archaeologist, Marek Zvelebil) were forced to flee after the Warsaw Pact invasion of Czechoslovakia. They fled to the United States at first, but later settled in the Netherlands.

During the late 1960s, he made many field trips including those to South India. From 1965 to 1966, he was a temporary professor in Dravidian studies at the University of Chicago in the United States and was a visiting professor at Heidelberg University between 1967 and 1968. Furthermore, he is very well known among the scholars in Tamil Nadu and has earned a permanent place in the educational syllabus of the Dravidian states.

In 1970, after more time at the University of Chicago, he was a visiting professor at the Collège de France in Paris. After more travel through European universities he became the professor of Dravidian linguistics and South Indian literature and culture at Utrecht University until his retirement in 1992.

Zvelebil also made the only known translation of the Tirukkuṛaḷ into Czech. It included some selections that appeared in Novy Orient, a Czech journal, during 1952–54.

== Books ==
He has authored numerous books and articles on Dravidian linguistics and literature. Some of them are:

- Comparative Dravidian Phonology, Published by Mouton, ASIN: B0006BZAIK
- Dravidian Linguistics: An Introduction, PILC (Pondicherry Institute of Linguistics and Culture), 1990
- Tamil Literature, E.J. Brill, Leiden, 1975, ISBN 90-04-04190-7
- Companion Studies to the History of Tamil Literature, Handbuch Der Orientalistik Series, Brill Academic Publishers, ISBN 90-04-09365-6
- The Smile of Murugan: On Tamil Literature of South India, ISBN 90-04-03591-5, Brill Academic Publishers (not to be confused with Michael Wood's book "The smile of Murugan: a south Indian journey")
- The Poets of the Powers: Magic, Freedom, and Renewal, ISBN 0-09-115901-6
- Literary Conventions in Akam Poetry
- Two Tamil Folktales: The Story of King Matanakama, the Story of Peacock Ravana, UNESCO Collection of Representative Works: Indian Series, ISBN 81-208-0212-8
- Lexicon of Tamil Literature, ISBN 90-04-10072-5, Handbuch Der Orientalistik, Brill Academic Publishers
- Nilgiri areal studies, Acta Universitatis Carolinae, Charles University in Prague, Karolinum Press, 1st ed edition (2001), ISBN 80-7184-945-6
- Introducing Tamil literature, ASIN: B0007JK3TC
- Ananda-tandava of Siva-sadanrttamurti: The development of the concept of Atavallan-Kuttaperumanatikal in the South Indian textual and iconographic tradition, Institute of Asian Studies; 1st ed edition (1985), ASIN: B0006EL29I
- Introduction to the Historical Grammar of the Tamil Language, Oriental Institute in Academia (1970), ASIN: B0006CIL44
- The Irulas of the Blue Mountains, Foreign & Comparative Studies (June 1988), ISBN 0-915984-91-1
- Tamulica et Dravidica: A Selection of Papers on Tamil and Dravidian Linguistics, Prague: KAROLINUM/CHARLES UNIVERSITY PRESS, 1998

== Bibliography ==
Kamil Zvelebil has authored more than 500 bibliographic items including books, articles and reviews and translations.

== See also ==
- List of translators
- Tirukkural translations into Czech
