= Karl Graul =

German missionary (1814–1864)

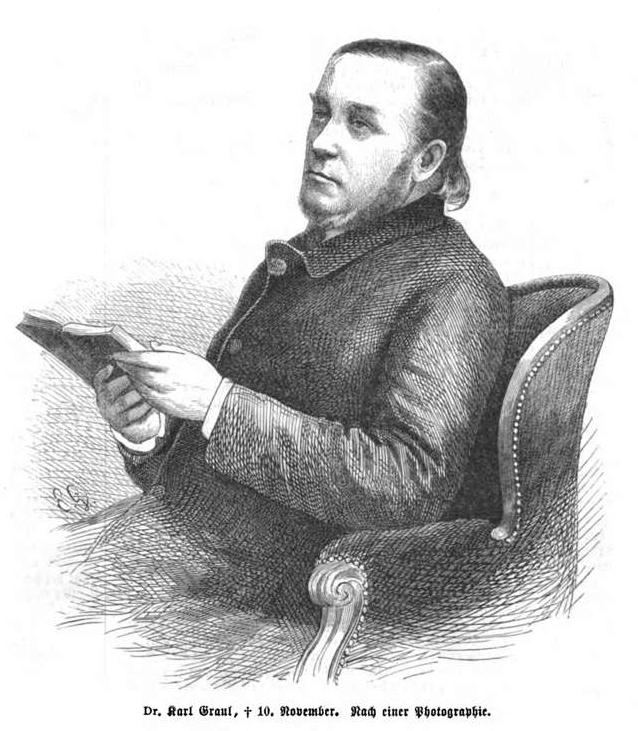
- Portrait of Karl Graul
- Born: 6 February 1814; Wörlitz, Anhalt-Dessau, Germany
- Died: 10 November 1864; Erlangen
- Occupations: Leader of Leipzig Lutheran mission and a Tamil scholar

Karl Graul (6 February 1814 – 10 November 1864) was a leader of Leipzig Lutheran mission and a Tamil scholar. He was born in a poor weaver family in Germany. He moved to India as the director of the Lutheran Leipzig Mission in 1849 and there he mastered Tamil.

Graul was one of the foremost figures in missiology. His approach towards caste system was considered to be too lenient by his critics since he considered that caste system would fade on its own accord and Christian organizations need not interfere with local traditions. He also advocated the supremacy of Lutheranism over other Christian denominations and found it hard to cooperate with Anglicans in India.

== Early life ==
Karl Graul was born in Wörlitz, in the Duchy of Anhalt-Dessau, into a poor weaver's family. In spite of his poor background he received good education in classical and modern languages as well as in theology. However, as for as mission and missiology is concerned he was entirely self-taught.

== Tamil scholar ==
Karl Graul was appointed the director of the Lutheran Leipzig Mission in 1844. The Lutheran mission had succeeded the Danish-Hale mission in South India. During his stay in India, Graul mastered the Tamil language. After returning to Leipzig in 1853 he taught Tamil language and literature at the mission house. Later Graul wrote Bibilotheca Tamulica seu Opera Praecipua Tamuliensium (1854–1865). A work in 4 volumes, it contains in its third and fourth volumes the first complete translation of the Tirukkural in Latin, German, and the standard spoken Tamil with notes and glossaries. It was published by his student Wilhelm Germann the year after Graul's death in Erlangen. Graul also wrote a Tamil Grammar in German (1855).

== Missiology ==
Graul being one of the foremost figures in missiology, insisted that other missionaries should go through academic training both in mission as well in theology. He insisted that the knowledge of locals with contextual approach towards indigenous churches.

== Views on caste system ==
Graul's views on caste system was considered by his critics as "too lenient". This was in light that Madras Missionary Conference resolved that no one should be admitted to baptism until he had shed off the caste identity and breaks the caste by eating food prepared by a person from the lower caste. According to Stephen Neill all Protestant missionary societies agreed to these terms except for Graul's Leipzig Evangelical Lutheran Mission. This was since Graul, who took a “middle” standpoint and regarded the caste as “a natural kingdom lying between the divine and the demonic”, believed that caste system can be removed only as a slow process and making it mandatory is not needed. It was his view that missionaries should not interfere with indigenous social orders unless they are wholly incompatible with the Gospel.

== Supremacy of Lutheranism ==
Graul believed in supremacy of Lutheranism over other Christian denominations. Thus he found it hard on mutual cooperation with Anglicans in India especially on communion.

== Death ==
Graul in 1864 qualified himself as a university lecturer in missiology at Erlangen. However, he died the same year even before taking up the position.

== Works ==
- Übersetzung von Dante Allghieri's Göttlicher Komödie; 1843. (Elektronischer Text auf www.dantealighieri.dk)
- Unterscheidungslehren der verschiedenen christlichen Bekenntnisse; 1845
- Die Ev.-Luth. Mission an die ev-luth. Kirche aller Lande; 1845
- Explanations concerning the principles of the Leipzig Society with regard to the Caste-Question; Madras 1851
- Reise nach Ostindien, 5 volumes; 1854–56
- Bibliotheca Tamulica sive Opera Praecipia Tamuliensium, 4 volumes
  - Volume 1: Tamulische Schriften zur Erläuterung des Vedanta-Systems oder der rechtgläubigen Philosophie der Hindus. Übersetzung und Erklärung von Karl Graul. Leipzig 1854. (Digitalisat)
  - Volume 2: Kaivaljanavanīta. A Vedanta Poem. The Tamil Text with a Translation and Glossary and Grammatical Notes. Leipzig/London 1855. (Digitalisat)
  - Volume 3: Der Kural des Tiruvalluver. Ein gnomisches Gedicht über die drei Strebeziele des Menschen. Übersetzung und Erklärung von Karl Graul. Leipzig 1856. (Digitalisat)
  - Volume 4: Kural of Tiruvalluver. High-Tamil Text with Translation into Common Tamil and Latin, Notes and Glossary. Leipzig 1865. (Digitalisat)
- Outline of Tamil Grammar; 1855
- Die christliche Kirche an der Schwelle des irenäischen Zeitalters; 1860
- Die Stellung der evangelisch-lutherischen Mission in Leipzig zur ostindischen Kastenfrage; 1861
- Über Stellung und Bedeutung der christlichen Missionen im Ganzen der Universitätswissentschaften; 1864
- Indische Sinnpflanzen und Blumen zur Kennzeichnung des indischen, vornehmlich tamulischen Geistes; 1864

== See also ==
- Tirukkural translations into German
- List of translators

== Sources ==
- Werner Raupp (Ed.): Mission in Quellentexten. Geschichte der Deutschen Evangelischen Mission von der Reformation bis zur Weltmissionskonferenz Edinburgh 1910, Erlangen/Bad Liebenzell 1990 (ISBN 3-87214-238-0 / 3-88002-424-3), p. 336-343 (a) Stellung der evanglisch-lutherischen Mission in Leipzig zur ostindischen Kastenfrage, 1861, p. 1-22; b) Über Stellung und Bedeutung der christlichen Missionen im Ganzen der Universitätswissentschaften, 1864, p. 4-14).
