= Central Institute of Classical Tamil =

Tamil language advocacy organisation

The Central Institute for Classical Tamil (CICT) logo

The Central Institute of Classical Tamil (CICT) is a body established by the Government of India with a view to promoting the cause of Classical Tamil. It is located in Chennai.

== History ==
The CICT was formerly known as the Centre of Excellence for Classical Tamil (CECT) and had been functioning at the Central Institute of Indian Languages, Mysore, a branch of the Department of Higher Education, Language Bureau, Ministry of Human Resource Development. In May 2008, the CECT was moved to Chennai and was rechristened as the Central Institute of Classical Tamil (CICT). The chairman of the new institute was the then Chief Minister of Tamil Nadu M. Karunanidhi. The governing body for Classical Tamil Institute (TLPB) was also changed as Aimperumkuzhu (literally "5-membered great team") and Enperayam (literally "8-membered great committee") under two vice-chairmen, V. I. Subramoniam and V. C. Kulandaiswamy, with the chairman for this governing body being M. Karunanidhi.

In 2012, the CITC published the only Meitei translation of the Kural. The work was undertaken by Soibam Rebika Devi, a botanist, linguist, and translator from Imphal, Manipur, who translated the complete work in prose form. The translation was completed in about a year and a half's time. It is considered the first ever translation of a Tamil work into the Meitei language. The translation was part of CICT's project of translating the Kural into multiple languages including Telugu, Kannada, Nepali, Punjabi and other Indian languages. The translation was officially released in Imphal in March 2014 by the governor of Manipur. In November 2014, the CICT planned to recite the Meitei translation along with translations in 9 other languages to commemorate the launch of the institution's Telugu and Kannada translations of the Kural text.

== Premises ==
Since May 2012, the CICT was functioning from the premises of Road Transport Corporation at Taramani. The government acquired a land at Perumbakkam and a fund of ₹ 246.547 million was allotted in 2017 to construct a building.

Since 2022, the CICT functions from its own building at Perumbakkam, a southern neighbourhood of Chennai. Built at a cost of ₹ 246.5 million on a 16.86-acre land, the four-storied building has a total built-up area of 70,000 square feet. The building houses a library and conference halls on the ground floor, office of the director and administrative offices on the first floor, offices of the academic staff on the second floor, and multimedia center on the third floor. As of 2022, the CICT has 22 academic staff and 23 non-academic staff.

== Functions ==
The CICT is engaged in the task of developing Tamil through various programmes of its own. The Institute is responsible for the Kural Peedam Award.

== Projects ==
The following are the ten major projects of The Centre of Excellence for Classical Tamil (CECT):

1. Definitive Editions of Ancient Tamil Works
2. Translation of Ancient Tamil Works
3. Historical Grammar of Tamil
4. Antiquity of Tamil: An Inter-Disciplinary Research
5. Synchronic And Diachronic Study of Tamil Dialects
6. India As a Linguistic Area
7. Digital Library For Ancient Tamil Studies
8. Online Teaching of Classical Tamil
9. Corpus Development For Classical Tamil Works
10. Visual Episodes on Classical Tamil

The Tamil Language Promotion Board (TLPB) has been changed as Aimpermkuzhu and Enperayam, with the board reconstituted.

== See also ==
- International Institute of Tamil Studies
