= Bedi =

Bedi may refer to:

== People ==
=== Historical figures ===
- Mehta Kalu (1440–1522, born Kalyan Das Bedi), Punjabi accountant and the father of Guru Nanak
- Guru Nanak (1469–1539, born Nanak Bedi), the first Sikh Guru
- Sri Chand (1494–1629, born Sri Chand Bedi), Punjabi ascetic and founder of the Udasi sect
- Lakhmi Das (1497–1555), Punjabi ascetic and founder of the Jagiasi sect

=== Punjabi heritage or association ===
- Bedi clan, clan in India
- Aadil Bedi (born 2001), Indian golfer
- Aadya Bedi, Indian theater artist and Bollywood actress
- Amarjeet Singh Bedi, Indian Army general
- Angad Bedi (born 1983), Indian actor and model
- Ankush Bedi (born 1991), Indian cricketer
- Baba Prithvirajendar Singh Bedi (born 1967), Indian skeet shooter
- Bishan Singh Bedi (1946–2023), Indian cricketer
- Daya Singh Bedi (1899–1975), Indian diplomat, civil servant, and cavalry officer in the British Indian Army
- Ekroop Bedi (born 1996), Indian actress
- Freda Bedi (1911–1977), British-born Tibetan Buddhist nun
- Gurcharan Singh Bedi, Indian air marshal
- Gurpreet Bedi, Indian actress
- Gagandeep Singh Bedi (born 1968), Indian bureaucrat
- Harmohinder Singh Bedi (born 1950), Indian academic and author
- H. S. Bedi (1946–2024), Indian judge
- H. S. Bedi (entrepreneur) (born 1952), Indian army officer, subsequently a businessman
- Jagjit Singh Bedi, Indian Navy vice admiral
- Joginder Singh Bedi, Indian track and field Paralympic athlete
- Kabir Bedi (born 1946), Indian television and film actor
- Khem Singh Bedi (1832–1905), Indian social reformer and claimed descendant of Guru Nanak
- Kiran Bedi (born 1949), Indian politician, social activist, former tennis player and police officer
- Kunwar Mohinder Singh Bedi Sahar (1920–1992), Indian Urdu poet
- Mandira Bedi (born 1972), Indian actress, fashion designer, model and television presenter
- Manek Bedi, Indian film actor
- Mitter Bedi (1926–85), Indian photographer
- Monica Bedi (born 1975), Indian actress and television presenter
- Narendra Bedi (1937–1982) Indian Bollywood film director, son of Rajinder Singh Bedi
- Naresh Bedi (born 1972), Indian wildlife film maker and photographer
- Nikki Bedi (born 1966), British television and radio presenter
- Nripjit Singh Bedi (a.k.a. Nippy Bedi, born 1940), Indian volleyball player
- Pooja Bedi (born 1970), Indian Bollywood actress and television talk show host
- Protima Bedi (1948–1998), Indian model turned Odissi exponent
- Purva Bedi (born 1974), Indian-born American actress
- Rajat Bedi (born 1972), Indian film actor and producer
- Rajinder Singh Bedi (1915–1984), Indian writer and playwright in Urdu, and film director, screenwriter and dialogue writer in Hindi
- Rakesh Bedi (born 1954), Indian actor, stage and television actor
- Raman Bedi (active from 1996), English academic and organiser in the field of dental care
- Ranjeet (birth name Gopal Singh Bedi, born 1941), Indian actor
- Sahib Singh Bedi (1756–1834), Punjabi saint and direct descendant of Guru Nanak
- Sanjeet Bedi (1977–2015), Indian television actor
- Sarla Bedi (1925–2013), Indian priestess who spent life in three continents
- Sohinder Singh Wanjara Bedi (1924–2001), Punjabi folklorist
- Susham Bedi (1945–2020), Indian author of novels, short stories and poetry
- Tarlochan Singh Bedi (1930–2025), Indian academic
- Vijay Bedi (born before 2005), Indian wildlife film maker and photographer

=== Other heritage or association ===
- Bédi Buval (born 1986), Martiniquais professional footballer
- Bence Bedi (born 1996), Hungarian footballer
- Jacopo Bedi, 15th-century Italian painter
- Mbenza Bedi (Hugues Bedi Mbenza, born 1984), Congolese footballer
- Tamocha Bedi (active from 2001), Botswana footballer
- Tibor Bédi (born 1974), Hungarian hurdler who competed at the 2000 Summer Olympics

== Places and structures ==
- Bedi, Gujarat, a census town in Jamnagar district, India
- Bedian, a village in Kasur district, Pakistan
- Bedi Mahal, a palace situated in Kallar Syedan, Rawalpindi District, Punjab, Pakistan
- Chak Bedi, a historical town of Pakpattan, a district in Punjab

== See also ==
- Vedi (disambiguation)
- Bed (disambiguation)
- Veda (disambiguation)
- Bedi Kartlisa, an academic journal specializing in the language, literature, history and art of Georgia (Kartvelology) 1948–84
- Bidugadeya Bedi, a 1985 Kannada film
- Kannadadda Kiran Bedi, a 2009 Kannada action drama film
