= Bedding (disambiguation) =

Bedding is material used above a mattress.

Bedding may also refer to:

- Bedding (animals)
- Bedding ceremony
- Bedding (geology)
- Bedding (horticulture)
- Rifle bedding

== See also ==
- Bed (disambiguation)
