= Vedic religion =

Vedic religion or Vedism may refer to:

- Historical Vedic religion, the religion of the Indo-Aryans of northern India during the Vedic period
- Hinduism, which developed out of the merger of Vedic religion with numerous local religious traditions
- Śrauta, surviving conservative traditions within Hinduism

== See also ==
- Vedas, a large body of religious texts originating in ancient India
- Vedanta (disambiguation), originally a word used in Hindu philosophy as a synonym for that part of the Veda texts also known as the Upanishads
- Vedic (disambiguation)
- History of Hinduism
