= VED =

VED or Ved may refer to:

- Ved (mythology), hairy humanoid in south Slavic mythology
- V_{Ed} – design shear force according to Eurocodes
- Ved, a 2022 Indian Marathi-language film
- Lea Ved, American dancer and choreographer
- Vacuum erection device, a treatment for erectile dysfunction
- Ved, a character from The Tribe 1999 TV series', a post-apocalyptic teen drama
- Ved Vardhan Sahni, a character in the 2015 Indian film Tamasha, played by Ranbir Kapoor
- Vedas, Hindu religious texts
- Vehicle Excise Duty in the UK
- Visual Enunciation Display, a telecommunications device for the deaf

== See also ==
- Veda (disambiguation)
- Vedi (disambiguation)
- Bed (disambiguation)
