= VEDC =

VEDC may refer to:

- Victorian Economic Development Corporation; see Robert Fordham#VEDC affair
- Valikamam East Divisional Council, municipality in Sri Lanka

== See also ==
- Vedic (disambiguation)
