= Bed (disambiguation) =

A bed is a piece of furniture that is used as a place to sleep, rest, and relax.

Bed, beds or B.E.D. may also refer to:

== Arts, entertainment and media ==
=== Film and television ===
- B.E.D. (film), a 2012 South Korean film
- "Bed", an episode of Men Behaving Badly
- The Bed (film), a 1954 French film
- The Bed, a 1968 short film by James Broughton
- Le Lit ('The Bed'), a 1982 drama film

=== Literature ===
- Bed (short story collection), 2007, by Tao Lin
- Beds, a 1930 book of humorous essays by Groucho Marx
- The Bed, a 1971 play by Sam Cree

=== Music ===
- B.E.D. (duo), an English music duo
- Bed (album), 1998, by Juliana Hatfield
- "Bed" (J. Holiday song), 2007
- "Bed" (Nicki Minaj song), 2018
- "Bed" (Joel Corry, Raye and David Guetta song), 2021
- "B.E.D." (song), by Jacquees, 2016
- B.E.D (album), the 2018 album by Baxter Dury, Étienne de Crécy, and Delilah Holliday
- "Bed", an unreleased song by SZA, 2015
- "Beds", a 2007 song by Lil' Fizz
- "The Bed", a song from the 1968 album Hair

=== Visual art ===
- Bed, a 1955 painting by Robert Rauschenberg
- Le Lit ('The Bed'), a c.1892 painting by Henri de Toulouse-Lautrec
- The Bed, a 2008 installation by Will Ryman

== Places ==
- Bedfordshire, England, abbreviated Beds
- Hanscom Field, an airport in Massachusetts, U.S., IATA airport code BED

== Other uses ==
- Bed (geology), a layer of sediment, sedimentary rock, or pyroclastic material
- B.Ed., Bachelor of Education
- Banana equivalent dose, informal unit of radiation exposure
- Binge eating disorder (BED)
- BED (file format), for genome information

== See also ==
- Bedding (disambiguation)
- Bedi (disambiguation)
- VED (disambiguation)
- Bed, Bed, Bed, a book and EP package by They Might Be Giants
