= Huvra =

Huvra الحفرة
- Village and village
- Country: Mauritania
- Time zone: UTC+0 (GMT)

Huvra is a village and town in Mauritania, a country in Northwest Africa. It is listed as one of the many small settlements that comprise the rural landscape of Mauritania.

== Geography ==
Huvra is located within the territorial boundaries of Mauritania, a predominantly Desert country bordered by the Atlantic Ocean to the West and the Sahara Desert inland. Like many rural settlements in the country, Huvra lies in an arid environment characteristic of the Sahel and Sahara climatic zones.

Temperatures in the area are typically high for much of the year, with significant variations between daytime and nighttime. Rainfall is usually concentrated in a short rainy season and plays a significant role in sustaining local livelihoods. Water availability is often limited in such areas, with communities relying on wells, boreholes, or seasonal water sources.

== Economy and infrastructure ==
Like other rural settlements in Mauritania, the economy of Huvra is likely centered on pastoralism, small-scale agriculture, and perhaps local trade. Rural communities in the country often rely on livestock herding, seasonal farming where feasible, and market exchanges with nearby towns.

== Culture ==
Cultural practices in Mauritania villages such as Huvra are influenced by Islam, which is the predominant religion in the country. Social life often revolves around family and community structures, traditional ceremonies, and local customs rooted in nomadic and sedentary heritage.
