= Tarlochan Singh Bedi =

Indian academic

- Born: c. 1930
- Died: 31 January 2025; Ludhiana, Punjab
- Occupation: Academic
- Known for: Translating Tirukkural into Punjabi
- Spouse: Darshan Kaur Bedi
- Children: 2 (Arvinder Singh Bedi and Gagandeep Singh Bedi)

Tarlochan Singh Bedi (c.1930–31 January 2025) was an academic better known for translating the Kural into Punjabi.

== Biography ==
With a master of arts degree and a doctorate, Tarlochan Singh Bedi served as principal of the Government College of Education at Faridkot, Punjab. Bedi has written articles on the cultural and linguistic similarities between Tamil and Punjabi. Bedi was married to Professor Darshan Kaur Bedi and has two sons. His elder son Arvinder Singh Bedi is a state manager of Magma, a finance company, and based at Ludhiana. His younger son Gagandeep Singh is Additional Chief Secretary of Rural Development and Panchayat Raj Department of Tamil Nadu, known for his tsunami rehabilitation work in 2004 during his tenure as district collector in Cuddalore.

In 2000, Bedi attended a seminar organised by the Tamil Department of the Madurai Kamaraj University, where he was requested by the university's vice chancellor Dr. Salihu, who chaired the seminar, to translate the Kural text into Punjabi. Finding similarities between the ideas of Guru Nanak and those in the Kural text, Bedi started translating the Kural into Punjabi and completed it in 2012, which was published by the Central Institute of Classical Tamil in Chennai. According to Bedi, "the focal point of the Tirukkural is feelings of love for human beings, which is what Guru Nanak preached too." In 2017, Bedi was honored by the Tamil Nadu state government.

== Death ==
Bedi died at the age of 95 in a private hospital in Ludhiana on 31 January 2025.

== See also ==
- Tirukkural translations
- Tirukkural translations into Punjabi
- List of translators
