= Vedha =

Vedha may refer to:

- Vedas, the oldest scriptures of Hinduism
- Vedha (2008 film), a 2008 Indian film
- Vedha (2022 film), a 2022 Indian film
- Vedha (composer), Indian music composer
- Vedha Muthu Mukandar, Indian convert to Christiany

== See also ==
- Veda (disambiguation)
