= Vedam =

Vedam may refer to:

- Singular form of Vedas in some South Indian languages
- Vedam Jaishankar, cricket correspondent
- Vedam Venkataraya Sastry (1853–1929), Sanskrit and Telugu poet, critic and dramatist
- Vedham Pudhithu Kannan, Indian film director, writer and producer in Tamil cinema
- Vedham, a 2001 Indian film
- Vedam (film), a 2010 Indian Telugu-language film

== See also ==
- Veda (disambiguation)
- Rathinirvedam (disambiguation)
- Vedalam, 2015 Indian Tamil-language action film
