= Vedantam =

Vedantam (Telugu: వేదాంతం) is a Telugu surname:

- Vedantam Raghavayya, Telugu film actor, choreographer director and producer.
- Vedantam Sathya Narayana Sarma, Kuchipudi dance teacher.
- Shankar Vedantam, American journalist and science correspondent

== See also ==
- Vedanta (disambiguation)
