= Vedi (disambiguation) =

Vedi may refer to:

- Vedi, a town in the Ararat Province of Armenia
- Vedi (altar), term for "sacrificial altar" in the Vedic religion.
- Vedi (film), a 2011 Indian Tamil-language action film by Prabhu Deva, featuring Vishal and Sameera Reddy
- The acrophonic name of the letter Ve (Cyrillic) in old Cyrillic alphabets

== See also ==
- Bedi (disambiguation)
- Veda (disambiguation)
- VED (disambiguation)
