= Rathinirvedam =

Rathinirvedam may refer to:

- Rathinirvedam (novel), a Malayalam-language novel by Indian writer P. Padmarajan
  - Rathinirvedam (1978 film), a film adaptation
  - Rathinirvedam (2011 film), remake of the 1978 film

== See also ==
- Vedam (disambiguation)
