= Beda (disambiguation) =

Beda was a Benedictine monk at the Northumbrian monastery of Saint Peter at Monkwearmouth.

Beda may also refer to:

- Beda, Alabama
- Beda (name)
- Beda people, a community found in Jammu and Kashmir
- Beda College, a college in Rome, Italy
- Beda Fell, a fell in the English Lake District

== See also ==
- Löhner-Beda, Austrian librettist
- Veda (disambiguation)
