= Veda (disambiguation) =

The Vedas are part of a set of Hindu texts.

Veda or Vedas may refer to:

== People ==
- Vedha (composer), Indian music composer
- Veda Ann Borg (1915-1973), American film actress
- Veda Brown, stage name of African-American former gospel and R&B singer Mildred Whitehorn (born 1949)
- Veda Hille (born 1968), Canadian singer-songwriter
- "Veda", nickname of Yoheved Kaplinsky (born 1947), American professor of music
- Veda Baloomoody, Mauritian politician
- Veda Krishnamurthy (born 1992), female Indian cricketer
- Veda Beaux Reves, Irish drag artist
- Veda Pratama, Indonesian Grand Prix motorcycle racer
- Vedha Muthu Mukandar, Indian convert to Christiany
- Veda Sastry, Indian 21st-century film actress
- Veda Shook, American flight attendant and union executive
- Veda Wright Stone (1906–1996), American activist who worked on the behalf of Native Americans
- Brandon Vedas (1981-2003), a man who died of drug overdose while using Internet Relay Chat

== Arts and entertainment ==
- Vedha, a 2008 Indian film
- Veda (film), a 2010 Turkish film
- Veda (2022 film), Indian Kannada-language film
- Vedaa, a 2024 Indian action film by Nikkhil Advani
- Vedera, an indie rock band formerly known as "Veda"
- Veda, a fictional supercomputer in the anime series Mobile Suit Gundam 00
- Vedha, a fictional villain in the 2017 Indian film Vikram Vedha and its 2022 remake

== Other uses ==
- Veda bread, a malted bread from Northern Ireland
- Veda (company), a credit information bureau operating in the Australia/New Zealand region
- Veda (NZ), the largest credit reference agency in New Zealand
- Vedas (horse), a racehorse
- Voluntarios en Defensa de los Animales (Volunteers in Defense of Animals), a nonprofit organization

== See also ==
- VED (disambiguation)
- Beda (disambiguation)
- Vedi (disambiguation)
- Vedic (disambiguation)
- Vedam (disambiguation)
- Vedanta (disambiguation)
- Vedan (disambiguation)
- Vedda (disambiguation)
- Vedha (disambiguation)
- other Indian texts called "Veda":
  - Fifth Veda
  - Dravida Veda
  - Pranava Veda (disambiguation)
