= Vedic University =

Vedic University may refer to these universities in India for Vedic studies:

- Maharishi Mahesh Yogi Vedic University in Katni, Madhya Pradesh, India
- Sri Venkateswara Vedic University, Andhra Pradesh, India

== See also ==
- International Vedic Hindu University or Hindu University of America, Florida, United States
- Vedic (disambiguation)
