= Vedan (disambiguation) =

Vedan is a 1993 Indian film.

Vedan may also refer to:

- Vedan, a former name of the Ramoshi tribe in Maharashtra, India
- Vedan (rapper), Indian rapper and songwriter

== See also ==
- Veda (disambiguation)
- Vedanā, Buddhist term referring to feelings and sensations
- "Vedana Vedana", a song by Vandemataram Srinivas and S. P. Balasubrahmanyam from the 2001 Indian film Ammayi Kosam
