= Vedda (disambiguation) =

Vedda may refer to:

- Vedda people, an indigenous people of Sri Lanka
- Vedda language, their language, now closely related to Sinahala

== See also ==
- Veda (disambiguation)
- Veddoid, an outdated racial classification including the Vedda
