= Tirukkural translations into Punjabi =

As of 2015, Tirukkural has been translated into Punjabi at least twice.

== Background ==
In 1983, the Kural text was translated into Punjabi by Ram Murthy Sharma. Titled Tirukkural: Dharma Granth of Tamils, this was published in Chandigarh. Another translated was made by Tarlochan Singh Bedi, former principal of the government college of Faridkot, in 2012, which was published by the Central Institute of Classical Tamil (CICT), Chennai, and released in November 2013. The translation was part of CICT's project of translating the Kural into multiple languages including Telugu, Kannada, Nepali, Manipuri and other Indian languages.

== Translations ==
| Translation | Chapter 26, ਮਾਸ ਖਾਣ ਦੀ ਨਿਖੇਧੀ | |
| Translation | Kural 254 (Couplet 26:4) | Kural 258 (Couplet 26:8) |
|---|---|---|
| Tarlochan Singh Bedi, 2012 | ਜੇਵ ਹਤਿਆ ਕਰਨੀ ਵੱਡਾ ਅਧਰਮ ਹੈ ਆਪ ਨਾ ਮਾਰਨ ਦਾ ਪਖੰਡ ਕਰਕੇ ਦੂਜਿਆਂ ਦੁਆਰਾ ਮਾਰਿਆ ਮਾਸ ਖਾਣਾ ਤਾਂ ਉਸ ਤੋਂ ਵੀ ਵੱਡਾ ਅਧਰਮ ਹੈ। | ਤ੍ਰਮ ਜਾਲ (ਮਾਇਆ ਜਾਲ) ਤੋਂ ਰਹਿਤ ਲੋਕ ਕਦੇ ਮਾਸ ਨਹੀਂ ਖਾਣਗੋ ਕਿਉਂ ਜੋ ਉਹਨਾਂ ਨੂੰ ਗਿਆਨ ਹੁੰਦਾ ਹੈ ਕਿ ਮਾਸ ਕਿਸੇ ਮਰੇ ਹੋਏ ਜੀਵ ਦਾ ਅੰਸ਼ ਮਾਤ੍ਰ ਹੈ। |

== See also ==
- Tirukkural translations
- List of Tirukkural translations by language

== Published translations ==
- Tarlochan Singh Bedi. (2012). Tirukkural in Punjabi, Central Institute of Classical Tamil. 296 pages. ISBN 978-93-81744-02-4
