= Tamocha Bedi =

Motswana footballer

Personal information
- Full name: Tamocha Bedi
- Place of birth: Botswana
- Position: Striker

Senior career*
Years	Team	Apps	(Gls)
2001–2005	TAFIC		
2006–2007	Nico United		
2007–	TAFIC		

International career
2002	Botswana	1	(0)
- * Club domestic league appearances and goals

Tamocha Bedi is a Motswana footballer who currently plays as a striker for TAFIC. He won one cap for the Botswana national football team in 2002.
