= Bed (geology) =

Layer of sediment, sedimentary rock, or pyroclastic material

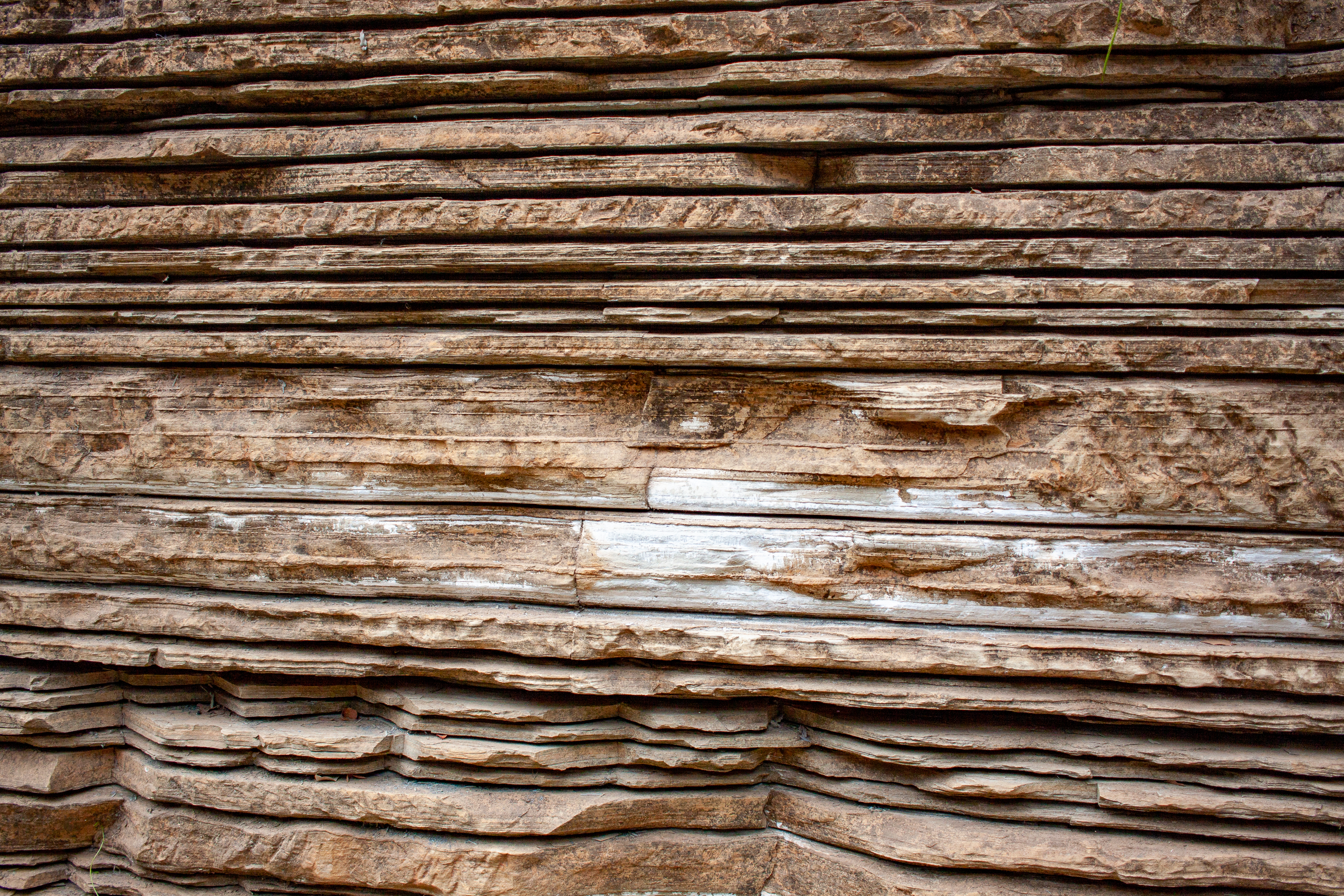
Beds of sedimentary rock at Parque Geológico do Varvito, Itu, São Paulo, Brazil

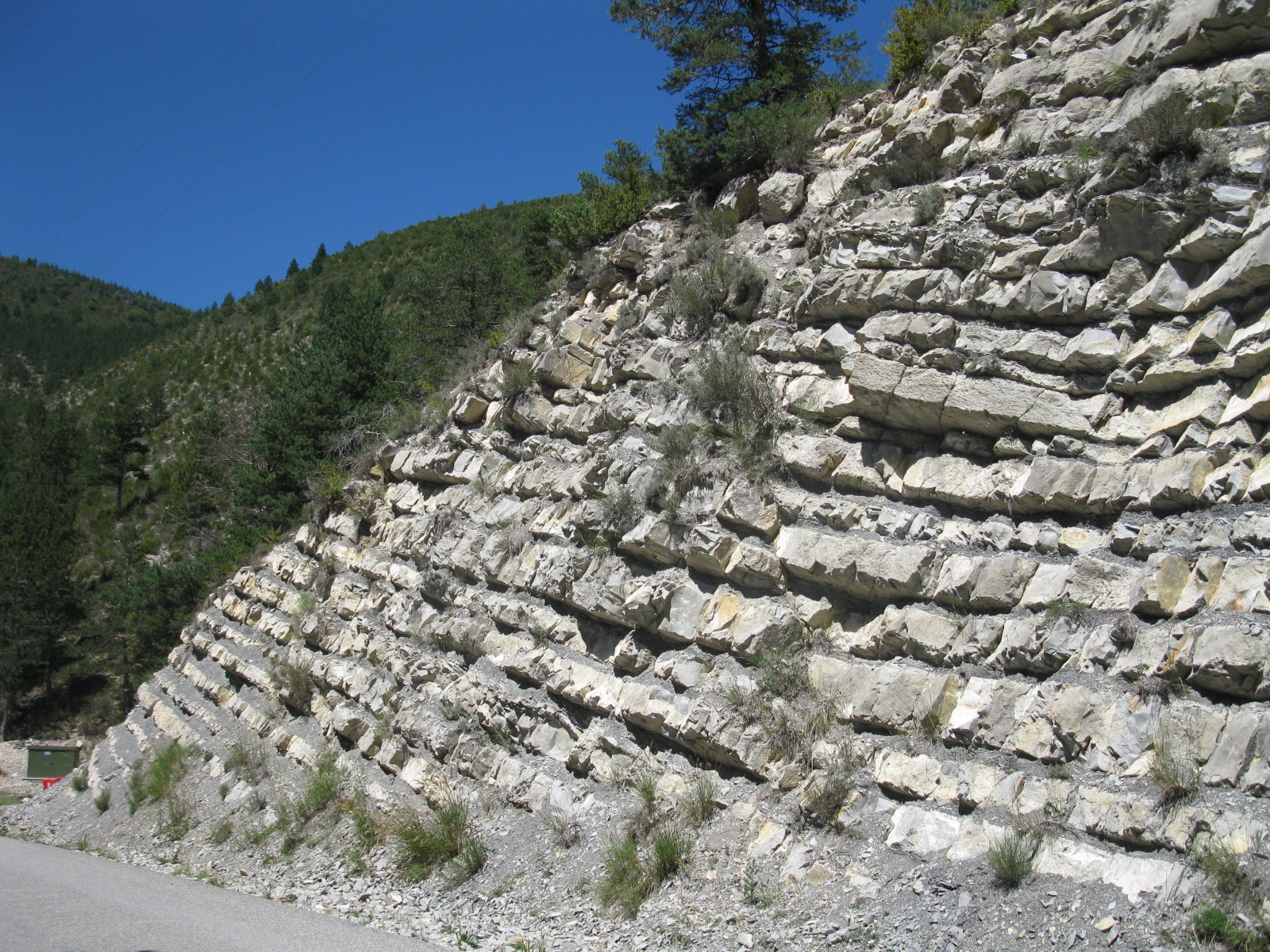
Originally horizontal beds of sedimentary rock were tilted by the Alpine orogeny, at Angles, Alpes-de-Haute-Provence, France

In geology, a bed is a layer of sediment, sedimentary rock, or volcanic rock "bounded above and below by more or less well-defined bedding surfaces". A bedding surface or bedding plane is respectively a curved surface or plane that visibly separates each successive bed (of the same or different lithology) from the preceding or following bed. In cross sections, bedding surfaces or planes are often called bedding contacts. Within conformable successions, each bedding surface acted as the depositional surface for the accumulation of younger sediment.

== Definitions ==
Specifically in sedimentology, a bed can be defined in one of two major ways. First, Campbell and Reineck and Singh use the term bed to refer to a thickness-independent layer comprising a coherent layer of sedimentary rock, sediment, or pyroclastic material bounded above and below by surfaces known as bedding planes. By this definition of bed, laminae are small beds that constitute the smallest (visible) layers of a hierarchical succession and often, but not always, internally comprise a bed.

Alternatively, a bed can be defined by thickness where a bed is a coherent layer of sedimentary rock, sediment, or pyroclastic material greater than 1 cm thick and a lamina is a coherent layer of sedimentary rock, sediment, or pyroclastic material less than 1 cm thick. This method of defining bed versus lamina is frequently used in textbooks, e.g., Collinson & Mountney or Miall. Both definitions have merit and the choice of which one to use will depend on the focus of the specific study on a case by case basis.

== Interpretation ==
Typically, but not always, bedding surfaces record changes in either the rate or type of accumulating sediment that created the underlying bed. Typically, they represent either a period of nondeposition, erosional truncation, shift in flow or sediment regime, abrupt change in composition, or combination of these as a result of changes in environmental conditions. As a result, a bed is typically, but not always, interpreted to represent a single period of time when sediments or pyroclastic material accumulated during uniform and steady paleoenvironmental conditions. However, some bedding surfaces may be postdepositional features either formed or enhanced by diagenetic processes or weathering.

The relationship between bedding surfaces controls the gross geometry of a bed. Most commonly, the bottom and top surfaces of beds are subparallel to parallel to each other. However, some bedding surfaces of a bed are nonparallel, e.g., wavy, or curved. Differing combinations of nonparallel bedding surfaces results in beds of widely varying geometric shapes such as uniform-tabular, tabular-lenticular, curved-tabular, wedge-shaped, and irregular beds.

== Types ==
Types of beds include cross-beds and graded beds. Cross-beds, or "sets," are not layered horizontally and are formed by a combination of local deposition on the inclined surfaces of ripples or dunes, and local erosion. Graded beds show a gradual change in grain or clast sizes from one side of the bed to the other. A normal grading occurs where there are larger grain sizes on the older side, while an inverse grading occurs where there are smaller grain sizes on the older side.

== Bed thickness ==
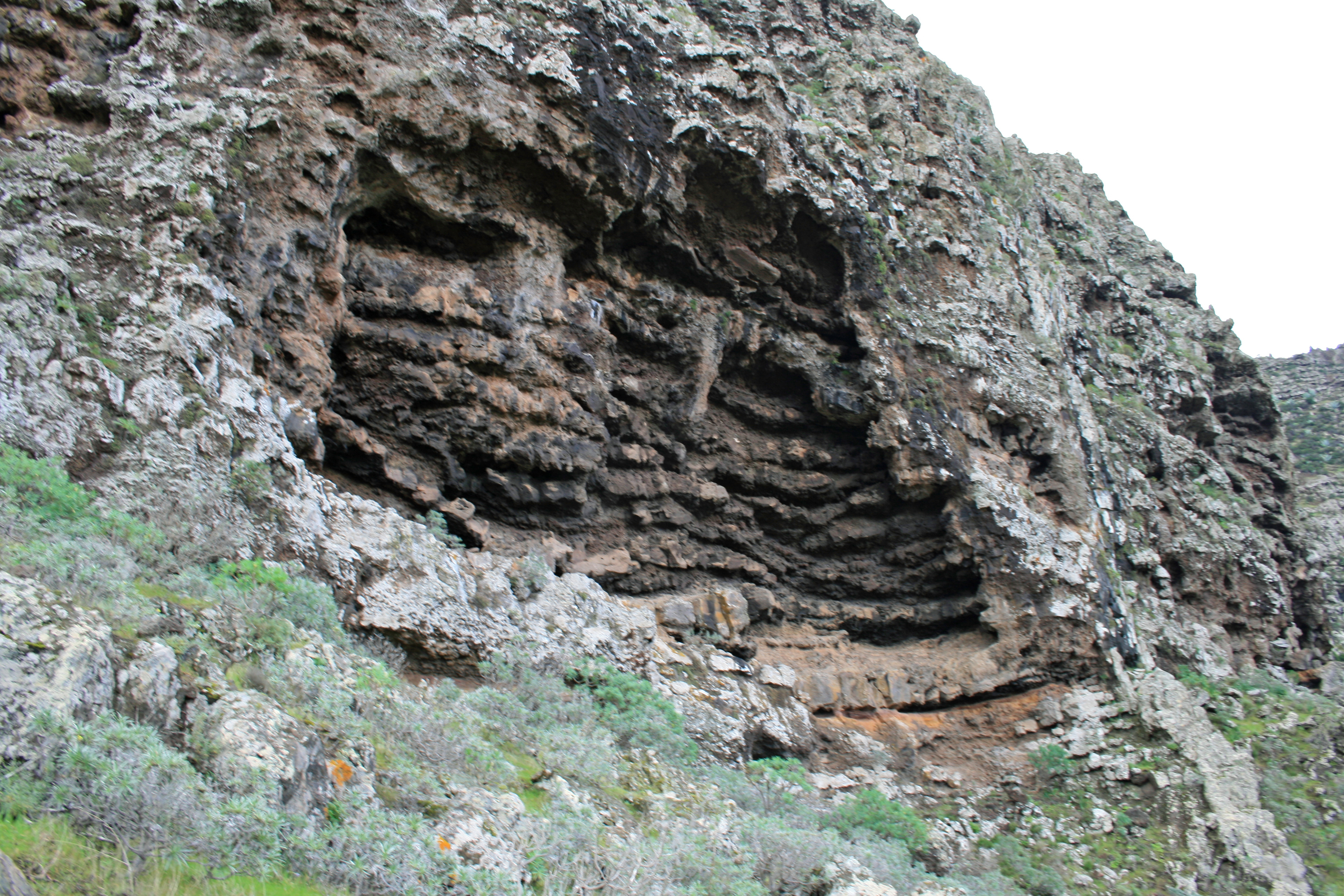
Beds of lava flows exposed on the island of La Gomera

Bed thickness is a basic and important characteristic of beds. Besides mapping stratigraphic units and interpreting sedimentary facies, the analysis of bed thickness can be used to recognize breaks in sedimentation, cyclic sedimentation patterns, and gradual environmental changes. Such sedimentological studies are typically based on the hypothesis that the thicknesses of stratigraphic units follows a log-normal distribution. Differing nomenclatures for the bed and laminae thickness have been proposed by various authors, including McKee and Weir, Ingram, and Reineck and Singh. However, none of them have been universally accepted by Earth scientists. In the practice of engineering geology, a standardized nomenclature is used for describing bed thickness in Australia, the European Union, and the United Kingdom.

Examples of widely used bed thickness classifications include Tucker (1982) and McKee and Weir (1953).

Classification of Thickness of Stratification
Bedding class	Tucker (1982)	McKee and Weir (1953)
Very thick	> 1 m	> 120 cm
Thick	30 cm – 1 m	60–120 cm
Medium	10 – 30 cm	
Thin	3 – 10 cm	5–60 cm
Very thin	1 – 3 cm	1–5 cm
Thickly laminated	3 – 10 mm	2 mm - 1 cm
Thinly laminated	< 3 mm	< 2 mm

== Bed in lithostratigraphy ==
According to both the North American Stratigraphic Code and International Stratigraphic Guide, a bed is the smallest formal lithostratigraphic unit that can be used for sedimentary rocks. A bed, a stratum, is the smallest formal unit in the hierarchy of sedimentary lithostratigraphic units and is lithologically distinguishable from other layers above and below. Customarily, only distinctive beds, i.e. key beds, marker beds, that are particularly useful for stratigraphic purposes are given proper names and considered formal lithostratigraphic units.

In case of volcanic rocks, the lithostratigraphic unit equivalent to a bed is a flow. A flow is “...a discrete, extrusive, volcanic rock body distinguishable by texture, composition, order of superposition, paleomagnetism, or other objective criteria.” A flow is a part of a member as a bed of sedimentary rock is a part of a member.

== Engineering considerations ==
In geotechnical engineering a bedding surface often forms a discontinuity that may have a large influence on the mechanical behaviour (strength, deformation, etc.) of soil and rock masses in tunnel, foundation, or slope construction.

== Geologic principles ==
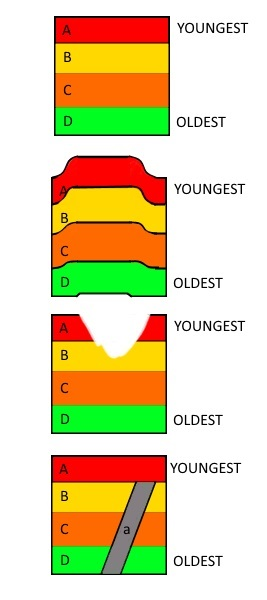
Vertical cross-sections of bed sequences to illustrate (from top to bottom) the Law of Superposition, the Law of Original Horizontality, the Law of Lateral Continuity, and Cross-Cutting Relationship

These are the principles which apply to all geologic features, and can be used to describe the order of events in a feature's geologic history.

- The Law of Superposition states that younger rocks are deposited above older rocks, and remain that way as long as the beds have not been overturned through tectonic activities. This is used to date the stratigraphy and their relative ages.
- The Law of Original Horizontality states that beds are deposited horizontally due to gravity. If the beds are not horizontal, then that is an indication that they have been tilted or warped by geologic processes.
- The Law of Lateral Continuity states that the bed deposits extend laterally in all directions. This implies that two places separated by erosional features with similar rocks may have originally been continuous.
- The law of Cross-Cutting Relationships states that any feature which cuts through another is the younger of the two. This can include faults or igneous dikes cutting through sedimentary bedding.

== See also ==
- Fold (geology)
- Geological formation
- Geological unit
- Interbedding
- Lamination (geology)
- Stratigraphy
