= Sarla Bedi =

- Born: Sarla Kapila; 4 April 1925; Sahnewal, India
- Died: 15 November 2013 (aged 88); Toronto, Canada
- Occupation: Religious priestess of Arya Samaj
- Years active: 1943–2013
- Known for: Establishing Arya Samaj in Toronto, Canada
- Spouse: Gobind Bedi

Sarla Bedi, née Kapila, (4 April 1925 – 15 November 2013), was an Indian priestess who spent her life living in three continents. She established the Arya Samaj, a Hindu reform movement, in Toronto, Canada and promoted social causes.

== Biography ==
Bedi was born Kapila in Sahnewal, India. At a young age she moved with her parents to Kenya, which was then a British colony, at the time of global economic depression. The family lived in a "segregated colony". She had five brothers. At age 18, her ambition to further her college education in law in England did not fructify as her parents were sick. To sustain her large family and educate her brothers she took up a job as a teacher in Nairobi. She also learned painting and developed oratorical skills with her participation in debates and lectures on Indian independence movement. She married Gobind Bedi in 1946; together they promoted social issues among the Indian diaspora. They had four children, sons Nilam, Deepak and Shalin, and daughter Sheetal. Her husband died in 2008. She also worked with the Arya Samaj at Nairobi.

Following an upheaval in political conditions in East Africa, particularly in Uganda where Indians in that country were persecuted, Bedi emigrated to Toronto, Canada in 1972. In Toronto, along with her husband, she established Arya Samaj, an offshoot of the Hindu reform movement that started in India in 1875; through this institution they facilitated a large number of immigrants to become established in Canada.

In 1976, Sarla became a priestess and was the first female Hindu priest in Ontario. She promoted Hindu culture as a priestess by conducting the Hindu religious rites of fire sacrifice, baptisms, weddings and funerals for the Indian diaspora. She was instrumental in raising funds for the institution. As a result, the institution's own building was built in 1996 in Markham as a Vedic Cultural Centre.

She died at the age of 88 on 15 November 2013, in Toronto.
