= Angles, Alpes-de-Haute-Provence =

Angles
- Commune
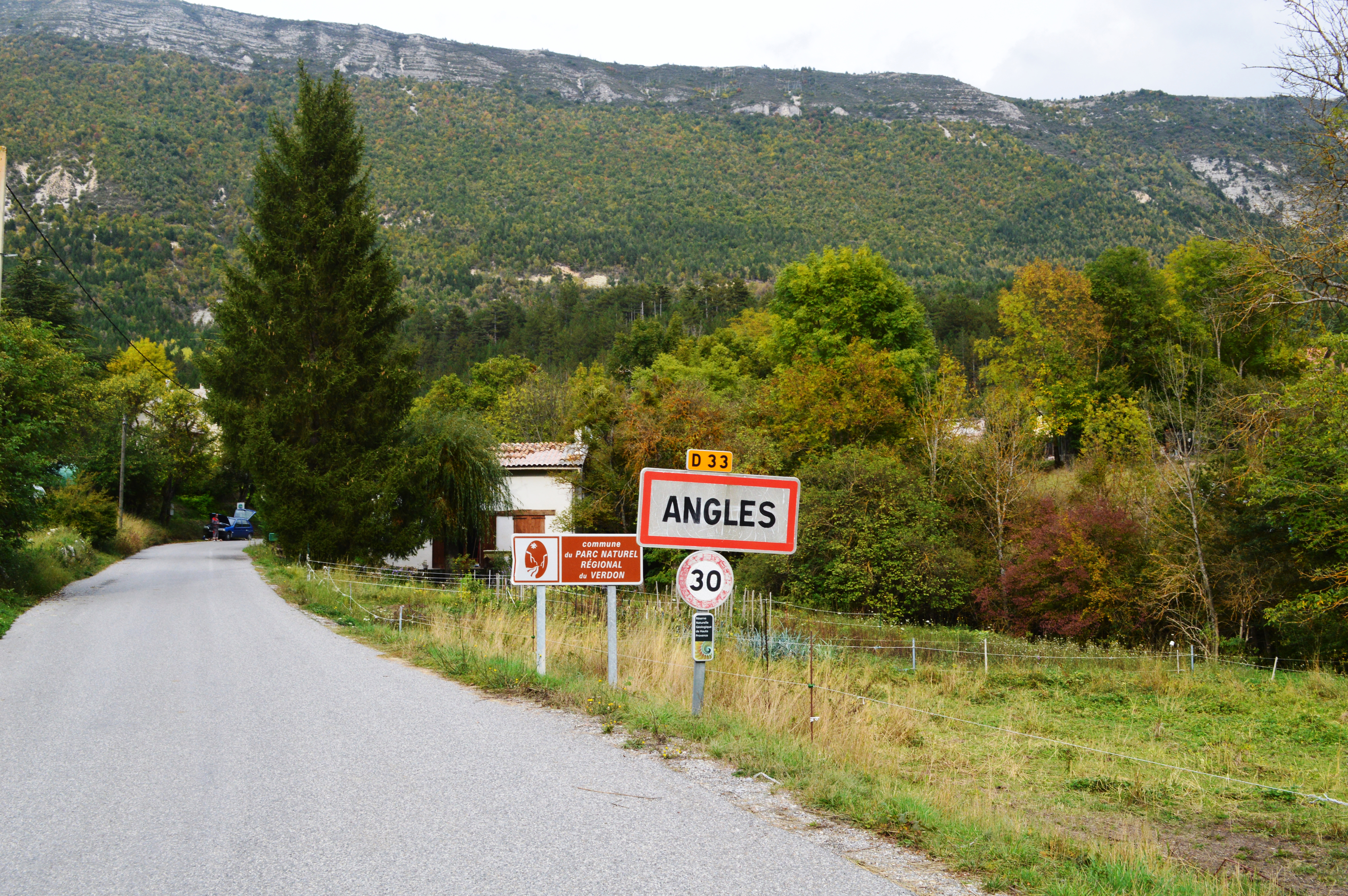
- The road into Angles

- Coat of arms
- Location of Angles
- Location within France Location within Provence-Alpes-Côte d'Azur
- Coordinates: 43°56′37″N 6°33′32″E
- Country: France
- Region: Provence-Alpes-Côte d'Azur
- Department: Alpes-de-Haute-Provence
- Arrondissement: Castellane
- Canton: Castellane
- Intercommunality: Alpes Provence Verdon - Sources de Lumière

Government
  - Mayor (2026–32): Aimé Bac
- Area^{1}: 9.83 km^{2} (3.80 sq mi)
- Elevation: 956 m (3,136 ft)
- Highest elevation: 1,777 m (5,830 ft)
- Lowest elevation: 880 m (2,890 ft)
- Population (2023): 72
  - Density: 7.3/km^{2} (19/sq mi)
- Time zone: UTC+01:00 (CET)
  - Summer (DST): UTC+02:00 (CEST)
- INSEE/Postal code: 04007 /04170
- ^{1} French Land Register data, which excludes lakes, ponds, glaciers > 1 km^{2} (0.386 sq mi or 247 acres) and river estuaries.

Angles (French pronunciation: [ɑ̃ɡl]) is a commune in the Alpes-de-Haute-Provence department in the Provence-Alpes-Côte d'Azur region of southeastern France.

== Geography ==
Angles is located some 5 km south-east of Saint-Andre-les-Alpes and 15 km north-east of Castellane. The village is close to the centre of the commune in the valley of the Torrent d'Angles at an altitude of 956m. National Highway N202 passes along the south-west edge of the commune in a tunnel with a country road branching north-east to the village then continuing south-east to Vergons. The commune is remote and rugged with extensive forests totalling 417 hectares which is almost half the total area. There is a small area of farming activity near the village.

The highest points in the commune are at Baisse d'Angles (1577m) and Serre Gros (1778m) on the Crest of Serres.

The Torrent d'Angles flows through the commune from the south-east and curves to the south-west where it joins the Verdon which is at the south-western border of the commune. Many tributaries flow into the Torrent d'Angles from the north including the Ravin des Bastides, Ravin de Pas d'Empicon, and numerous other unnamed streams.

== Toponymy ==
The locality was reported for the first time in texts from the 13th century (Angulis). The name refers to an element of the landscape shaped like a wedge: the village according to Ernest Nègre, or the fields according to Fénié.

The name of the district of Moustier is from the traces of the priory of Lérins in that name.

== History ==
Augustus conquered the valley of the Verdon at the same time as the Alps which he completed in 14 BC. It is difficult to know the name of the Gallic people who inhabited the valley nor who were the Civitas on whom the Angles valley depended in the High Empire: Eturamina (Thorame), Civitas Saliniensum (Castellane), or Sanitensium (Senez). At the end of the Roman Empire, its connection to that of Sanitensium and its diocese seems proven.

The locality appears for the first time in charters from 1245 as it was a co-lordship of the bishops of Senez and the Abbey of Lérins. Its priory was joined to Vergons in 1454. The Abbot of Lérins built a hospice which then passed to Agoult.

The community was under the Viguerie of Castellane.

The inhabitants of Angles lead a struggle against the local lord over several generations and denied the rights of the half-lords to any inheritance. After the non-payments and a trial, the Lord's pew in the church was smashed to pieces. In 1731, the Lord's harvest was not gathered, and everyone was forbidden to do so. The steward narrowly escaped a lynching.

A permanent primary school has existed in Angles since 1776. In 1788 the priory disappeared with the secularization of Lérins Abbey

During the French Revolution the town had a patriotic society which was formed after the end of 1792.

=== Heraldry ===
Arms of Angles	Blazon: Quarterly, at 1 and 4 Gules with two interlaced triangles of Argent, at 2 and 3 Or with a wolf rampant of Azure tongued and armed in Gules.

== Administration ==
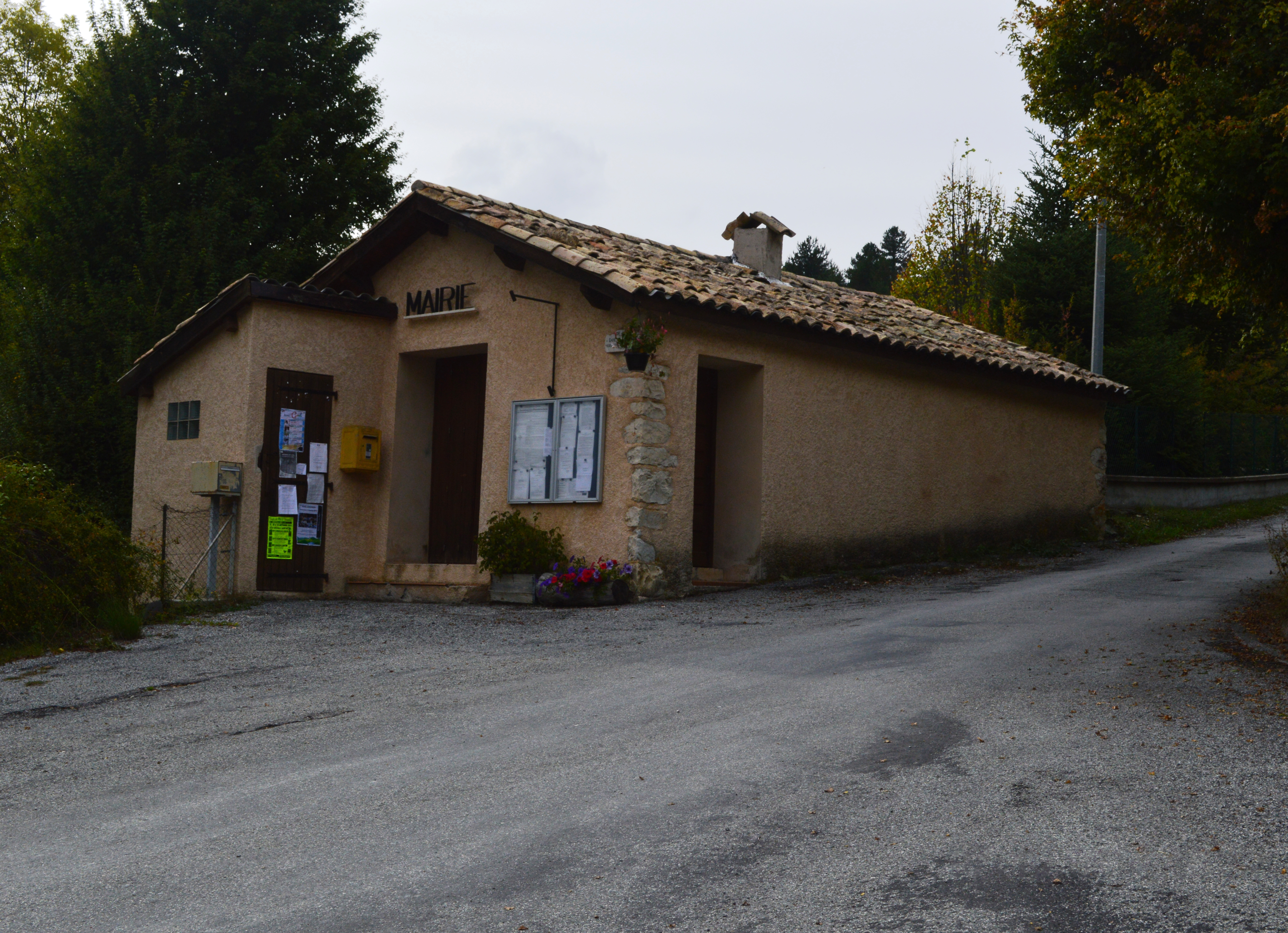
The Town Hall

List of Successive Mayors

From	To	Name	Party	Position
1977		Flavien Raybaud		
2001	Current	Aimé Bac	DVD	Farmer

== Population ==
Historical population
Year	Pop.	±% p.a.
1968	57	—
1975	55	−0.51%
1982	65	+2.42%
1990	56	−1.85%
1999	67	+2.01%
2007	72	+0.90%
2012	65	−2.02%
2017	68	+0.91%
2023	72	+0.96%
Source: INSEE

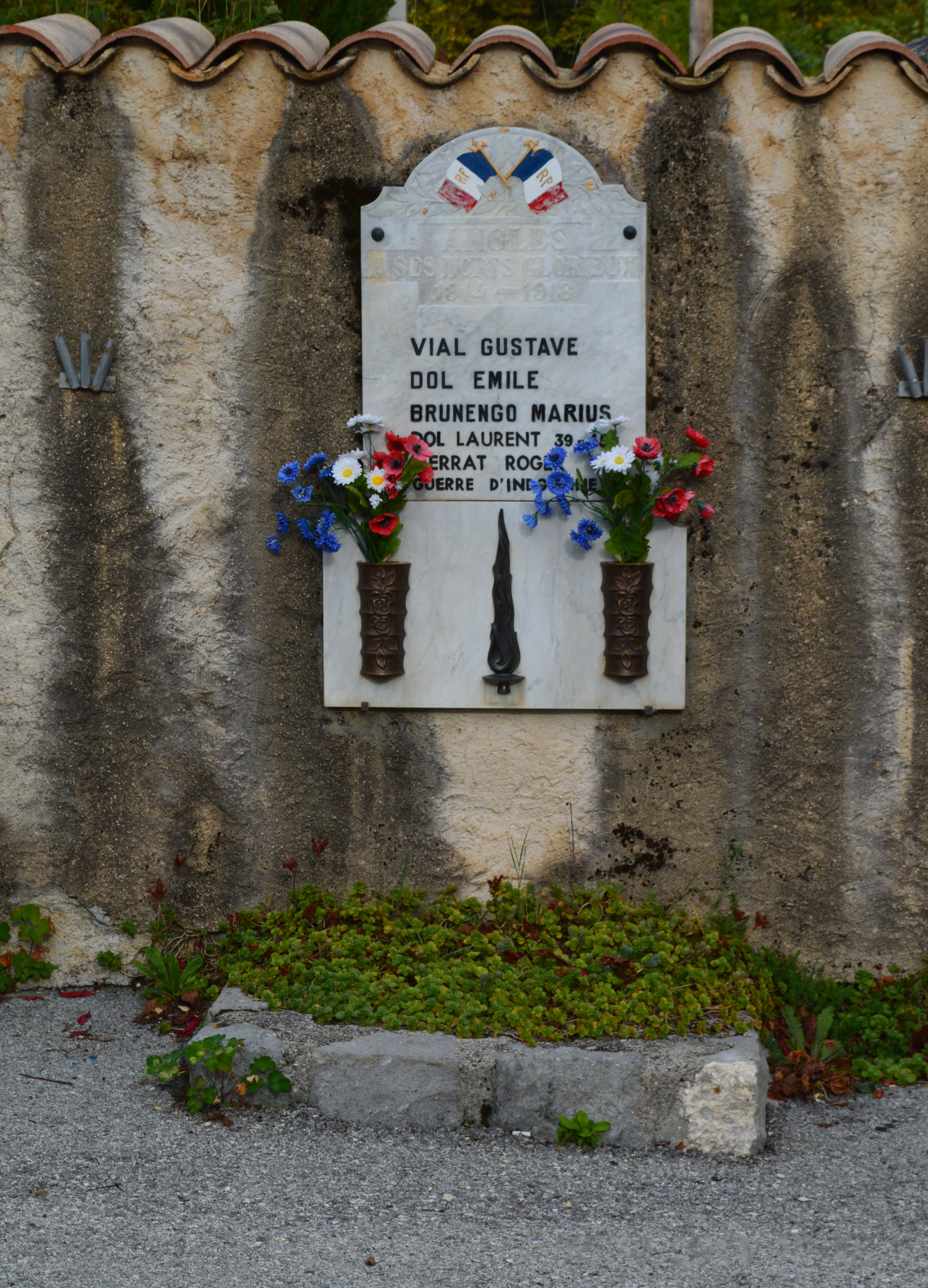
Angles War Memorial

The demographic history of Angles is marked by a period of "stagnation" where the population was relatively stable at a high level. This period lasted until 1861. The rural exodus then caused a decline in population of long duration. By 1901 the town had lost more than half its population from the historical maximum in 1806. The downward trend continued to 1970. Since then population growth has very slowly resumed.

== Economy ==
In 2017 the active population was 24 people, including three unemployed. These workers are in majority employees (67%), and are in majority employed outside the commune (71%).

At the end of 2015 the primary sector (agriculture, forestry, fisheries) had two establishments, and employed one person.

The number of farms, according to the Agreste survey by the Ministry of Agriculture, remained stable in the 2000s at 3 which specialise in the breeding of sheep. From 1988 to 2000 the agricultural area (UAA) fell significantly to 113 hectares from 603 hectares with most of the remaining in grass. In contrast, the utilized agricultural area declined sharply in the 2000s: it went from 608 to 63 hectares.

At the end of 2015 the secondary sector (industry and construction) had 3 establishments but had no employees. The tertiary sector (trades and services) had 3 establishments (with two employees).

According to the Departmental Observatory of tourism, the tourism business is important for the town (considering the population) with between 1 and 5 tourists welcomed for each resident. Most of the accommodation capacity is non-market. Structures specifically to accommodate tourists are rare in Angles. There are:

- camping at the farm;
- some furnished accommodation;
- some cottages;
- there are no hotels or group accommodation

Considering the low supply, it is ultimately the second homes that have the highest capacity: 29 of 75 housing units in the commune are second homes (39%).

=== Natural and technological risks ===
None of the 200 communes of the department is in a no seismic risk zone. The canton of Saint-André-les-Alpes to which Angles belongs is in zone 1b (low risk) according to the deterministic classification of 1991, based on the seismic history and in zone 4 (medium risk) according to the probabilistic classification EC8 of 2011. Angles commune is also exposed to four other natural hazards:

- avalanche
- forest fire,
- flood (in the lower Torrent d'Angles)
- landslide: the commune has an average to high hazard in certain areas of its territory.

The commune of Angles is also exposed to a risk of technological origin: the transport of dangerous goods by road. The N202 national road can be used by trucks carrying dangerous goods and pass within the limits of the commune.

No risk prevention plan for foreseeable natural disasters (PPR) exists for the commune and a DICRIM has existed since 2011.

The town has not been subject to any natural disasters. The earthquake felt most strongly in Angles was at Chasteuil on 30 November 1951.

== Culture and heritage ==
=== Civil heritage ===
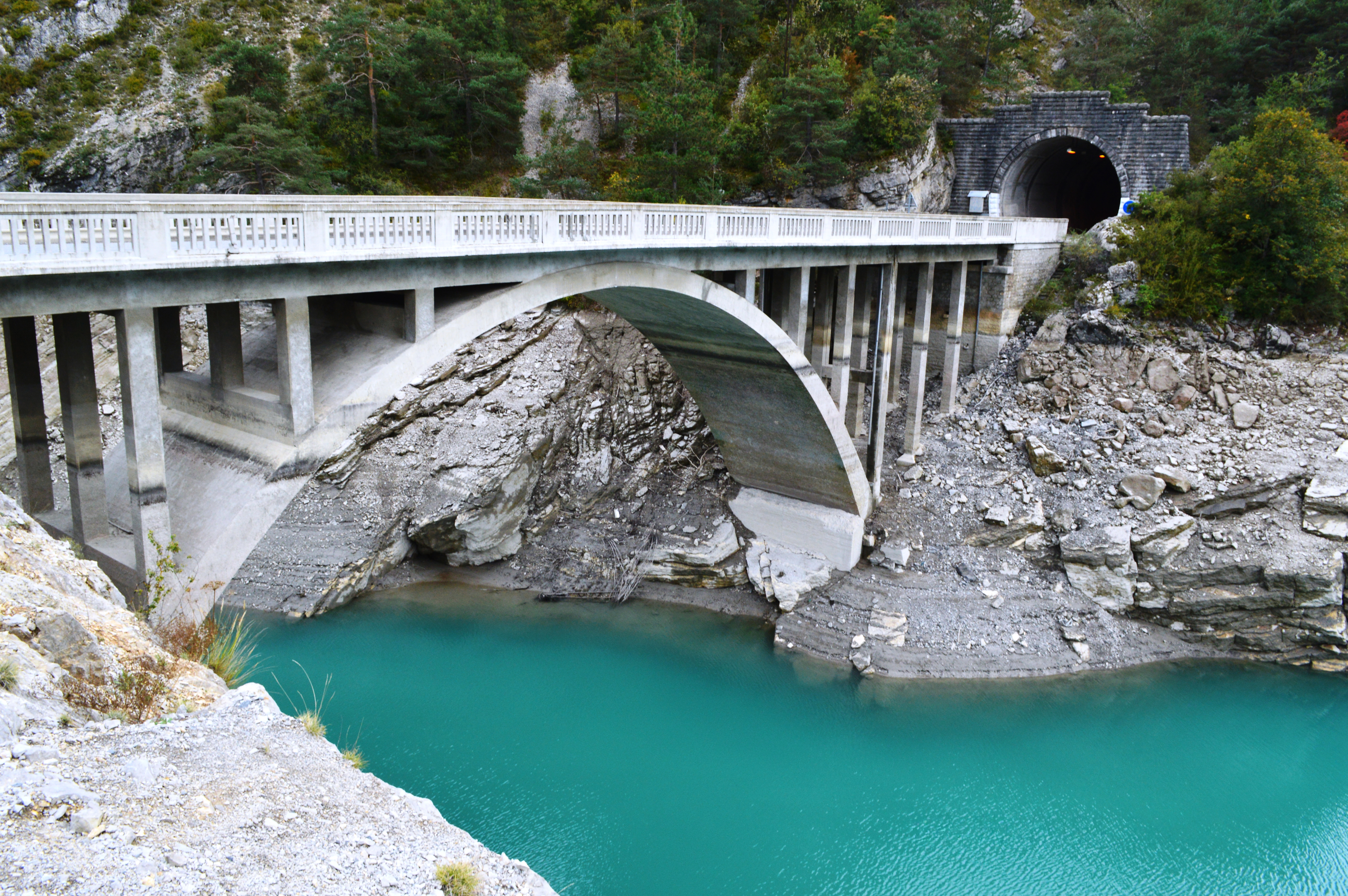
Angles Bridge

The commune has many buildings and structures that are registered as historical monuments:

- Angles Bridge (1947)
- Farmhouses (18th-20th centuries)
- The Primary School (20th century)
- An Agricultural Storehouse at Les Coutails (1893)
- An Agricultural Storehouse at Les Perruches (18th century)
- An Agricultural Storehouse at La Bourgade (18th century)
- An Agricultural Storehouse at La Bourgade (18th century)
- An Agricultural Storehouse at Les Perruches (19th century)
- Agricultural Storehouses (18th-20th centuries)
- A House at Moustier (18th century)
- A House at Moustier (18th century)
- A House at La Bourgade (18th century)
- A House at La Bourgade (18th century)
- A House at La Bourgade (18th century)
- A House at La Bourgade (18th century)
- A House at La Bourgade (18th century)
- Houses (18th-19th century)
- A Bread Oven (19th century)
- A Fountain and Lavoir (Public laundry) (1898)
- A Lavoir (Public laundry) (1932)
- A Lavoir (Public laundry) (1932)
- A Drinking Trough (18th century)

=== Religious heritage ===
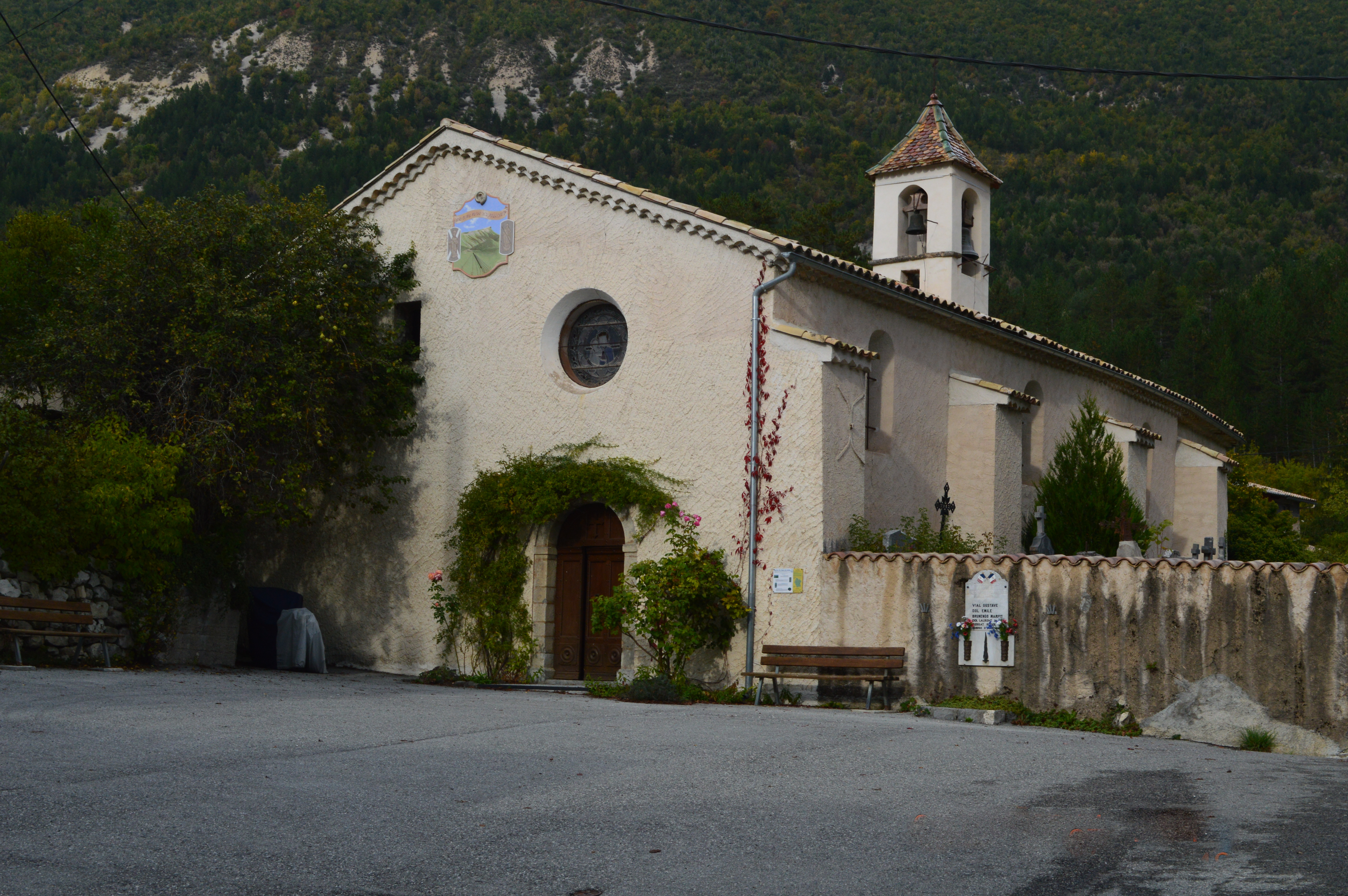
The Church of Notre-Dame

The commune has several religious buildings and structures that are registered as historical monuments:

- The Chapel of Notre-Dame-de-Bon-Secours (1870) has a polygonal choir with cross ribs from the 16th or early 17th century. It was in ruins at the end of the 19th century but was restored in the 1970s, contrary to the statements of diocesan investigations of the 19th century which gave a construction date of 1870. The Furniture in the Chapel is registered as an historical object.
- The Parish Church of Notre-Dame (1686) has a bell tower with polychrome tiles. The Church contains a very large number of items that are registered as historical objects.
- Oratories and Wayside Crosses (19th-20th centuries)
- A Chapel of Saint-Jean also existed south of the village but it disappeared in the 19th century

=== Gallery of Historical Objects in Angles ===
Historical Monuments

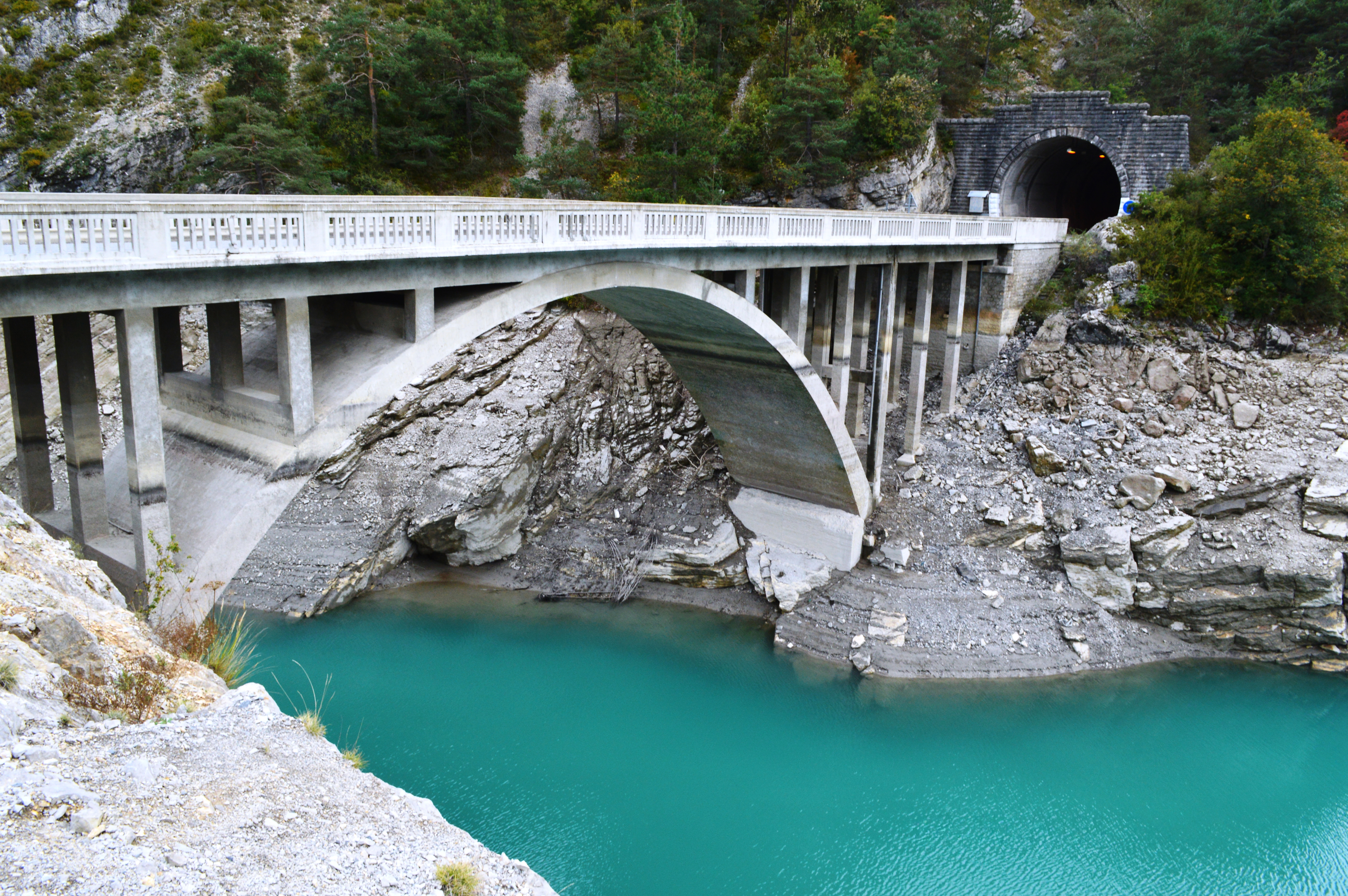
Angles Bridge

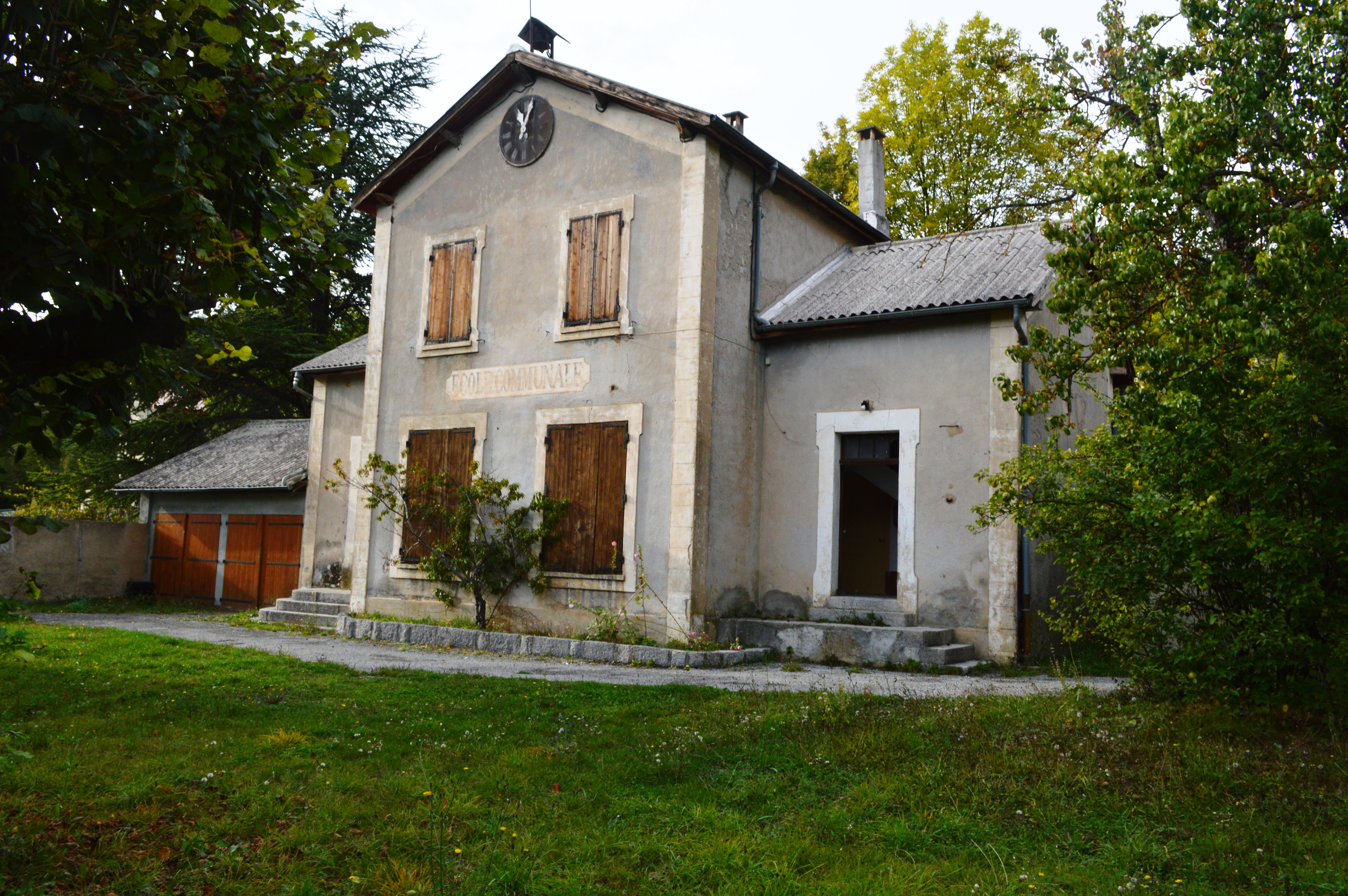
The Primary School

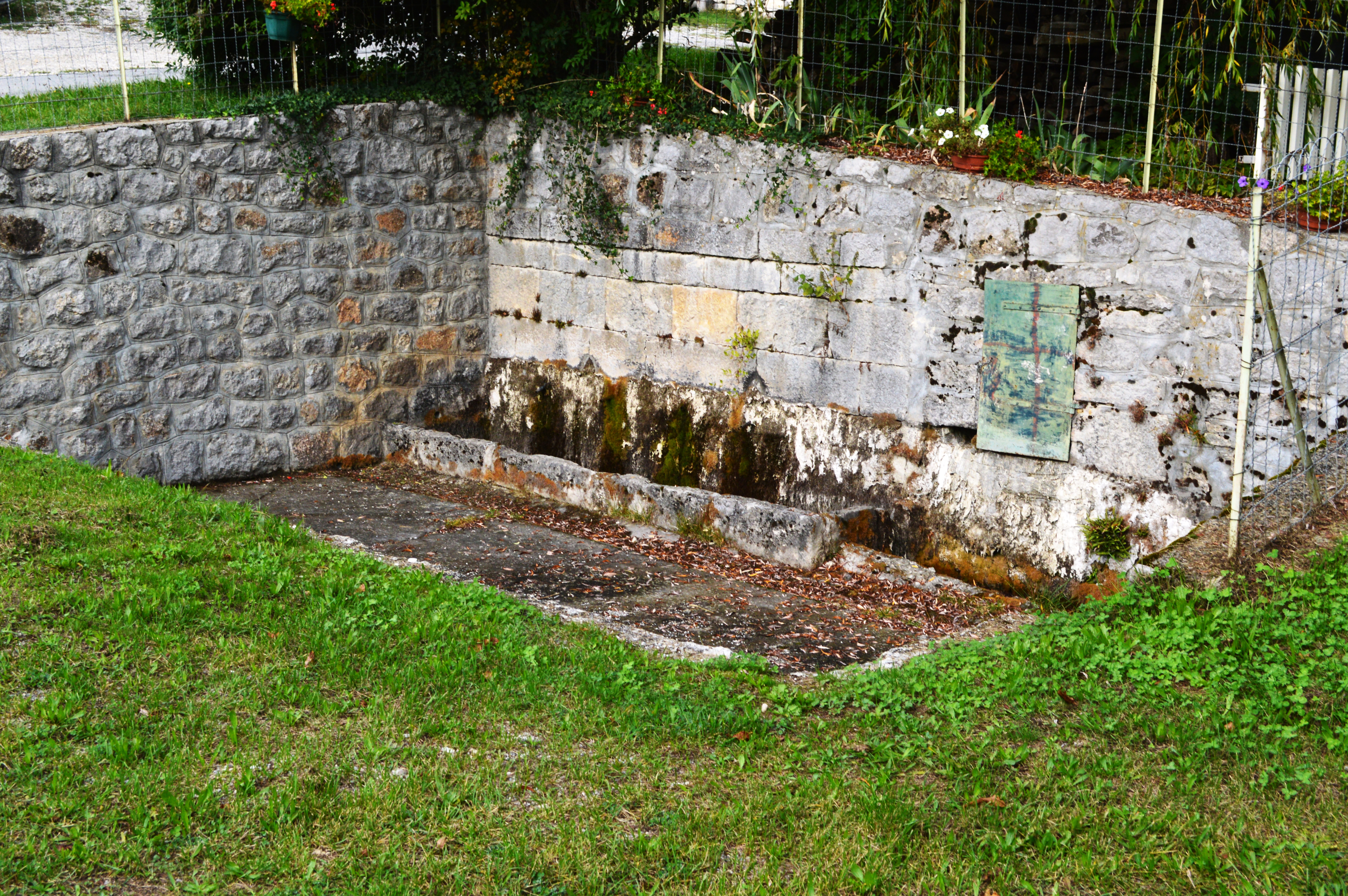
The Drinking Trough

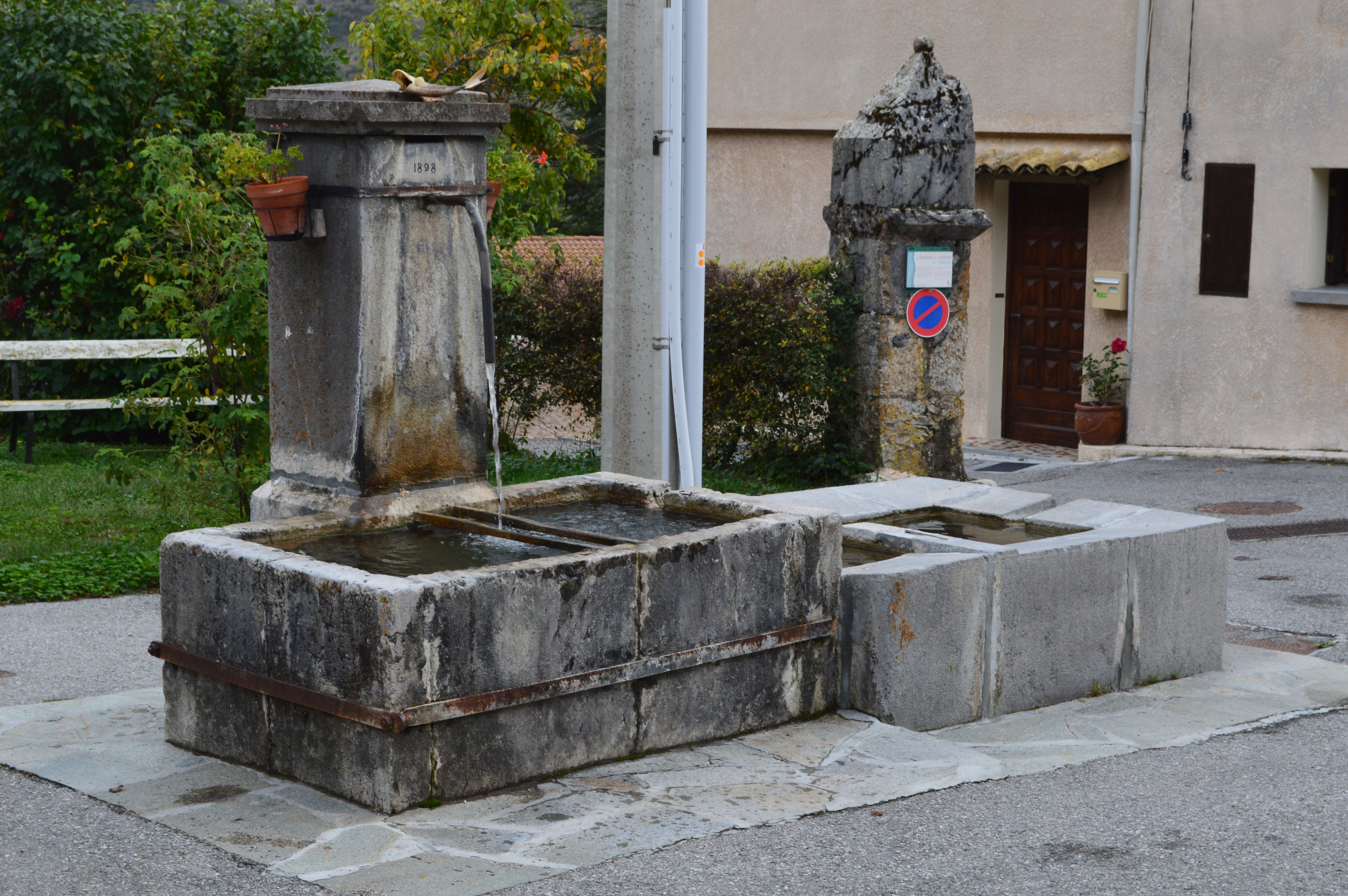
The Fountain and Lavoir

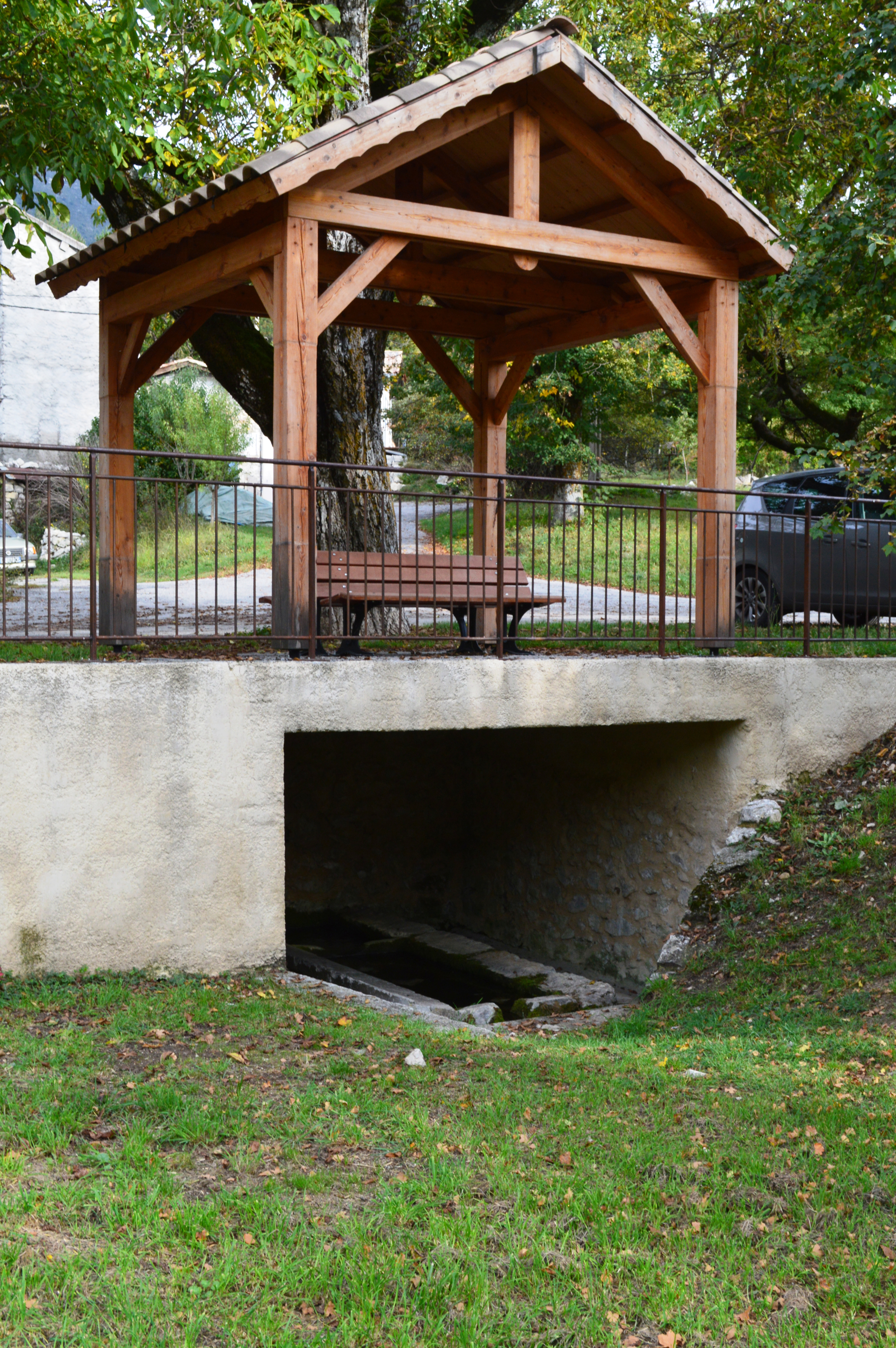
Lavoir (Public Laundry)

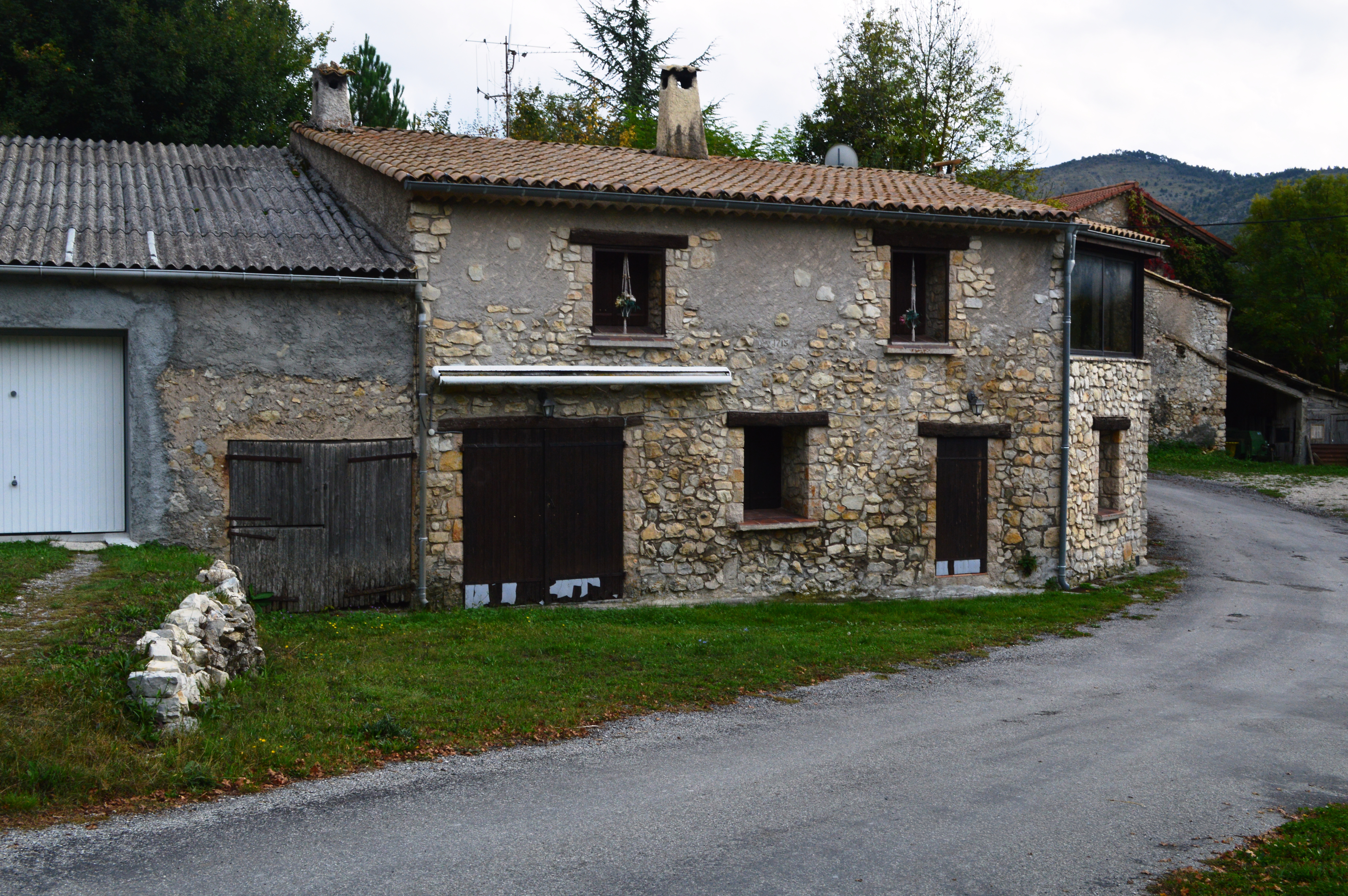
An old house in Angles

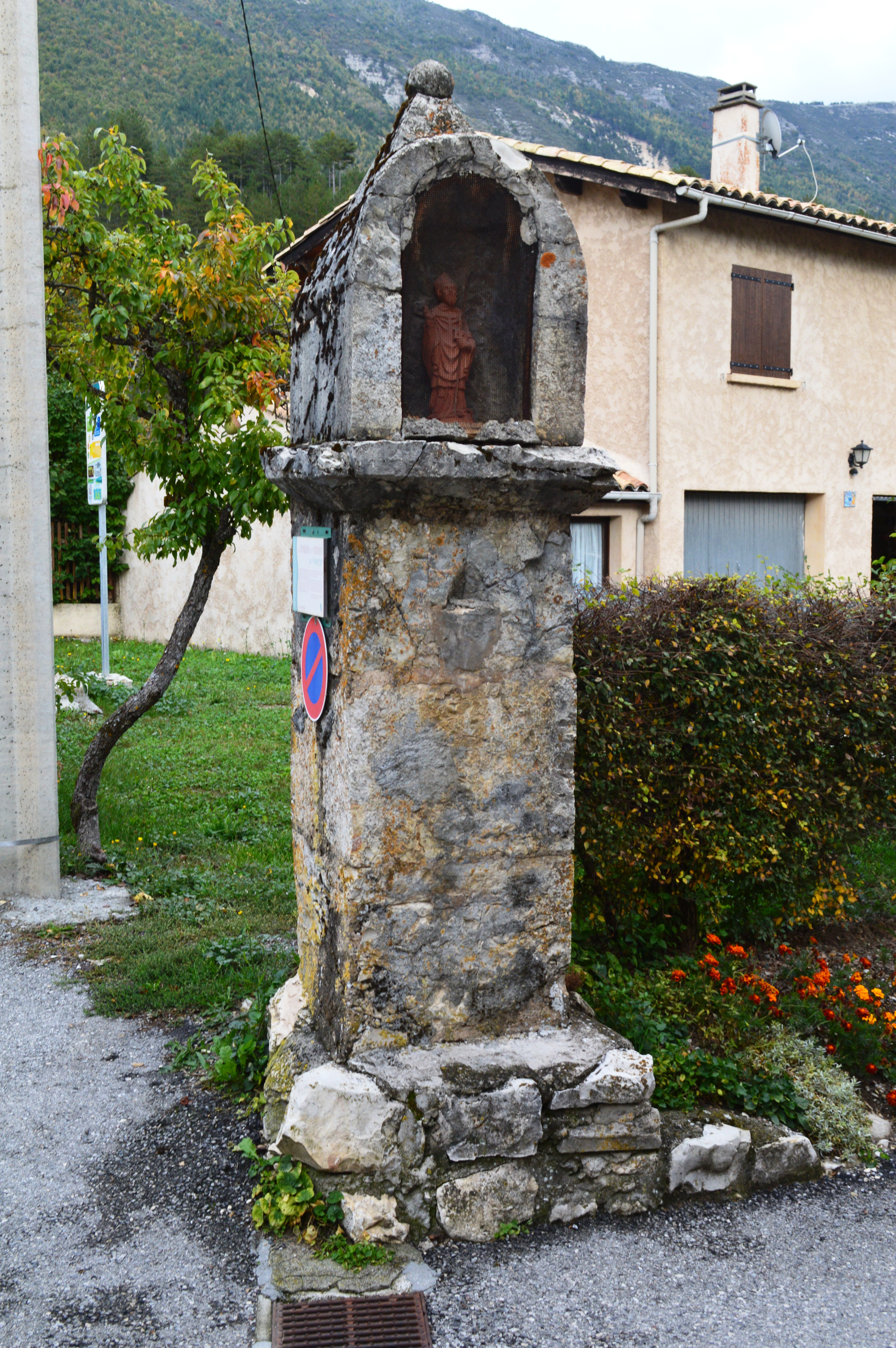
An Oratory

Historical Objects in the Church

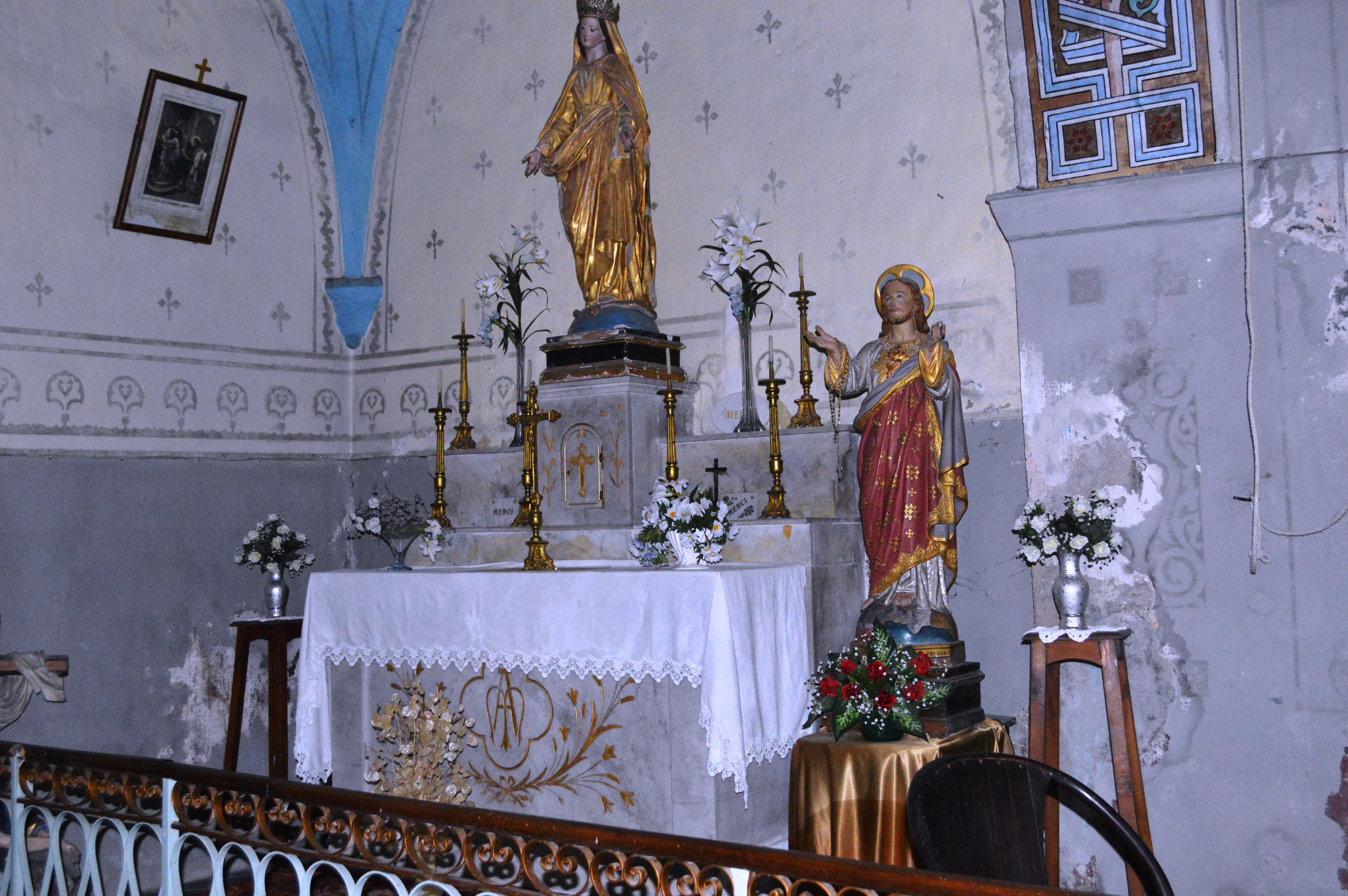
Secondary Altar

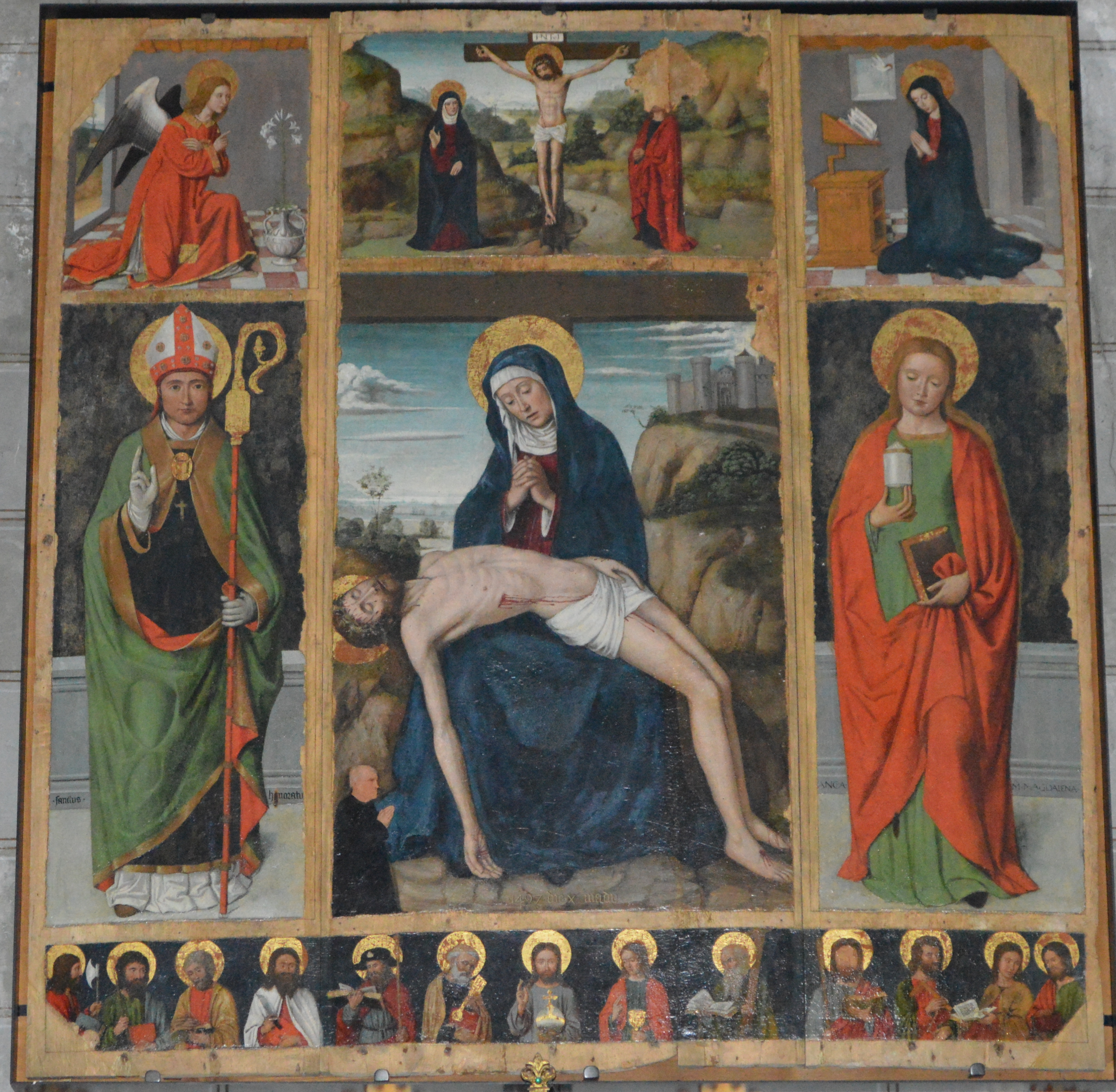
A Triptych: Pieta

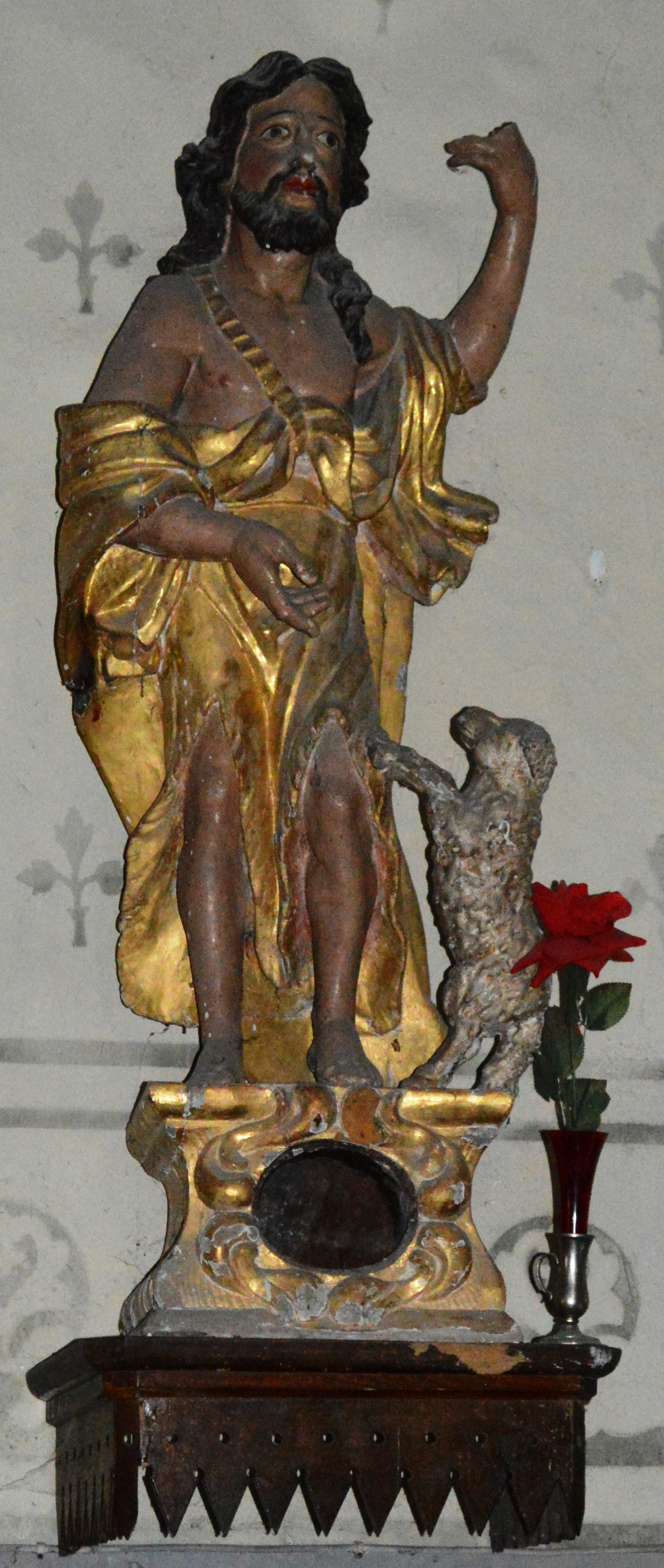
Statue: Saint John the Baptist

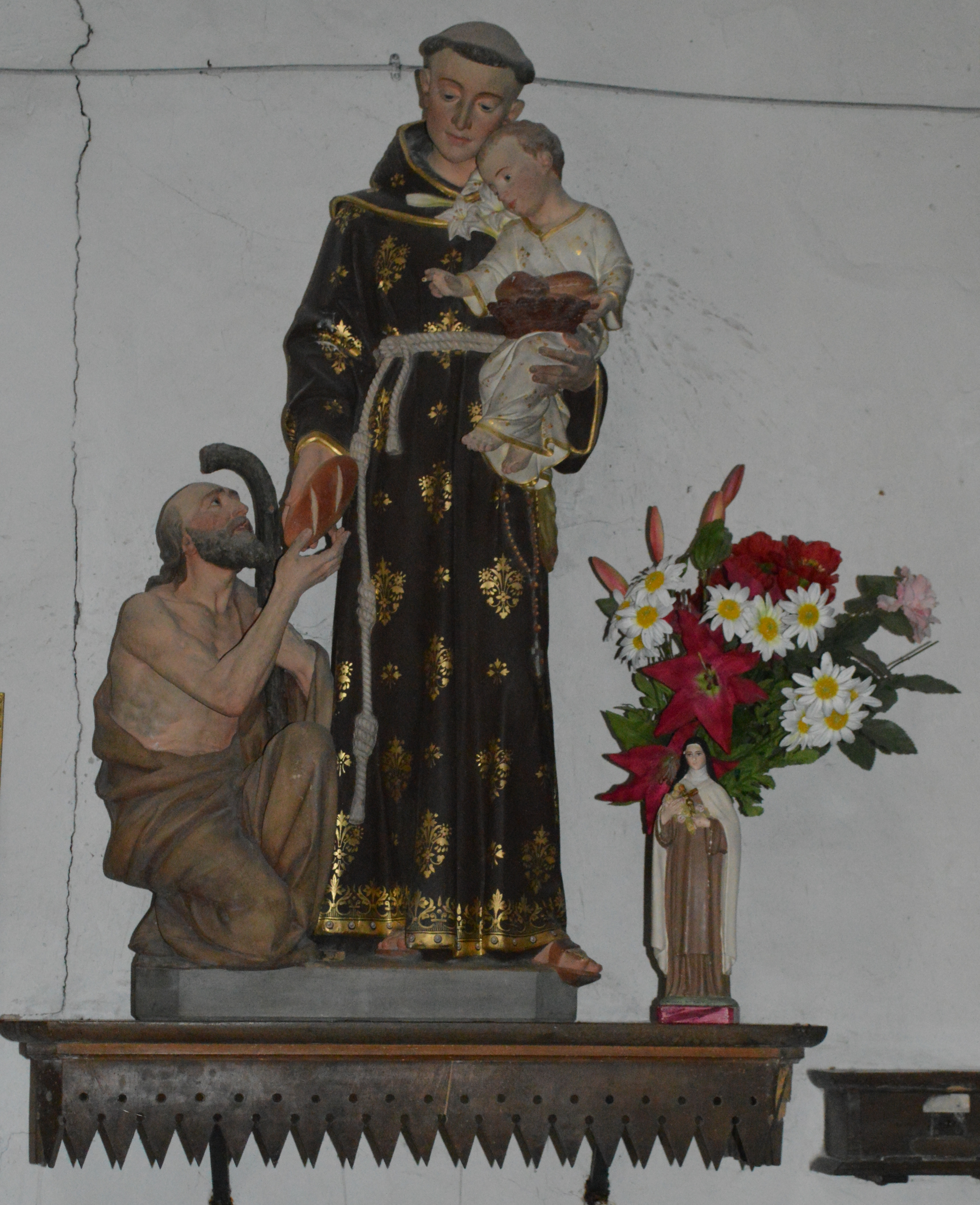
Statue: Charity of Saint Antoine of Padua and the child Jesus

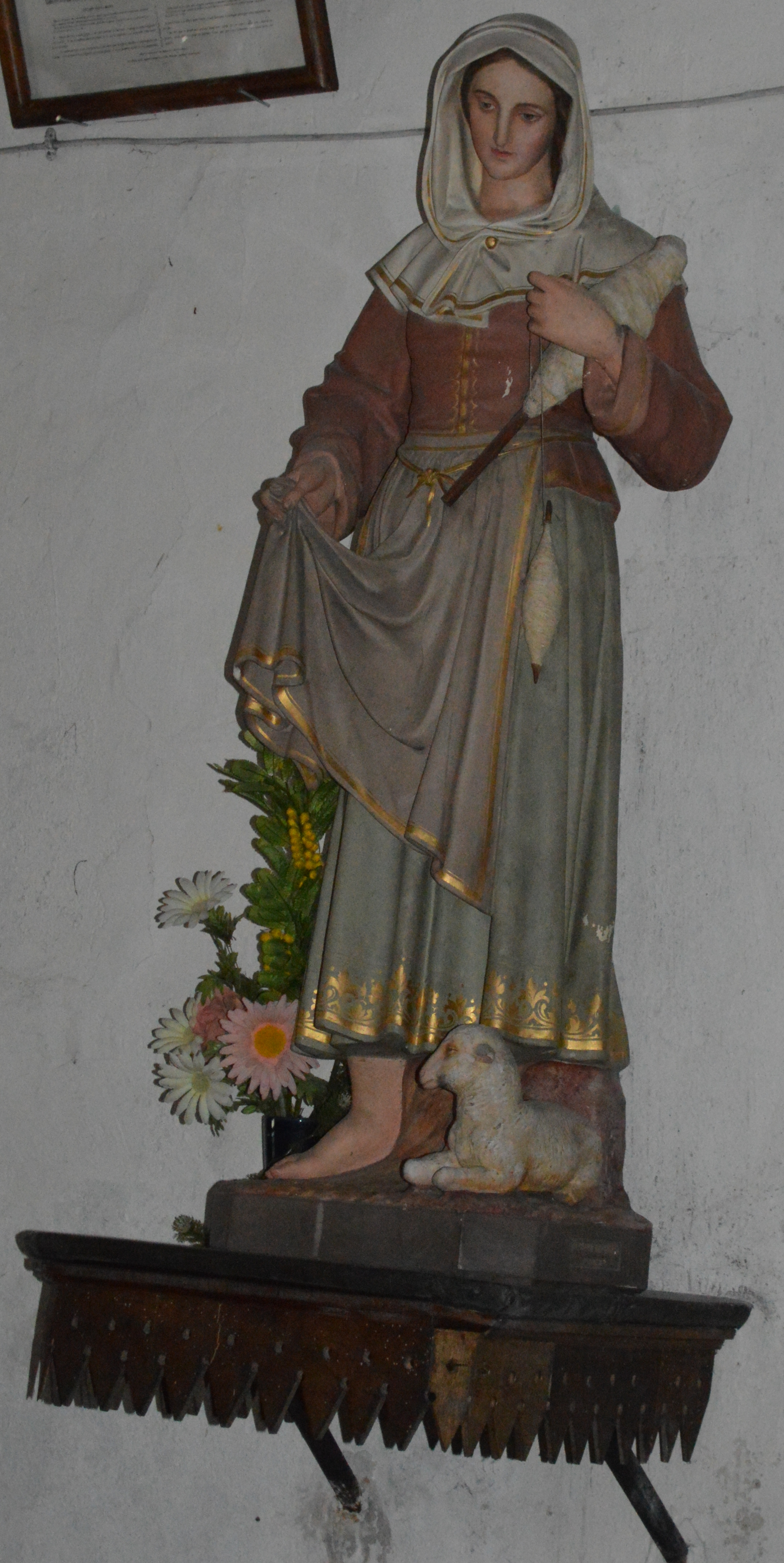
Statue: Saint Germaine

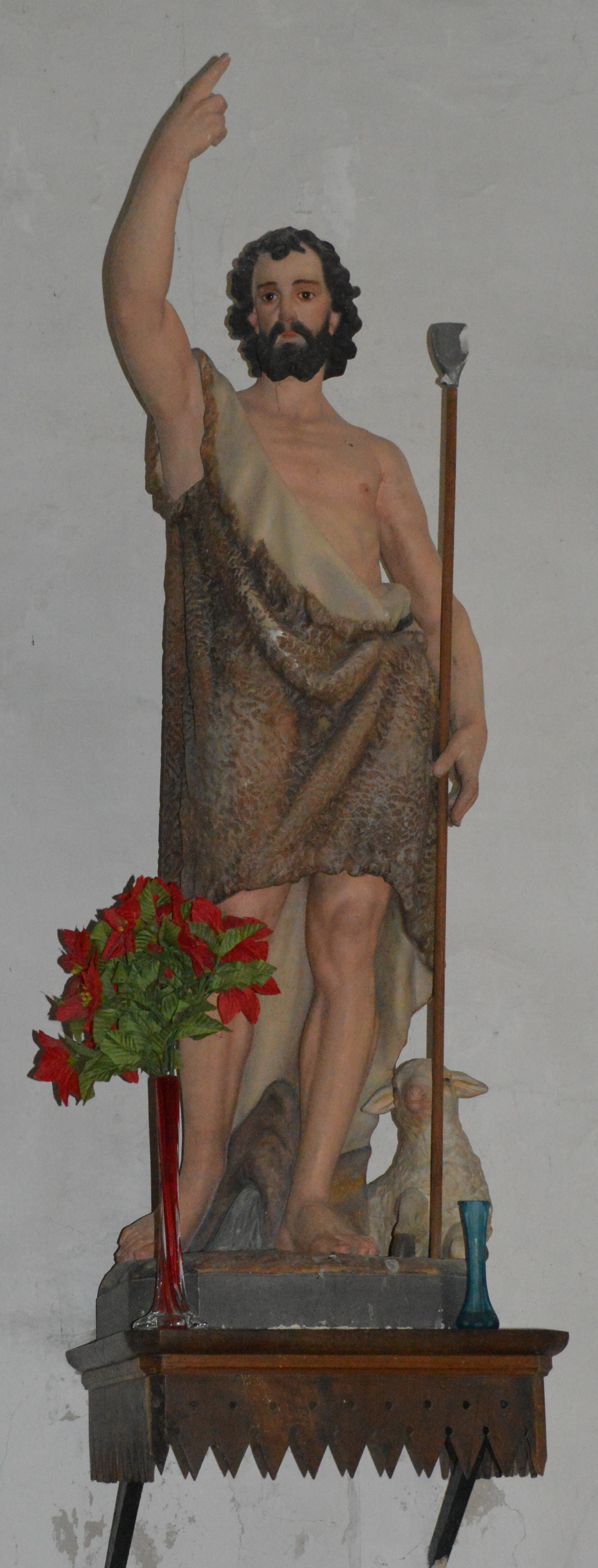
Statue: Saint John the Baptist

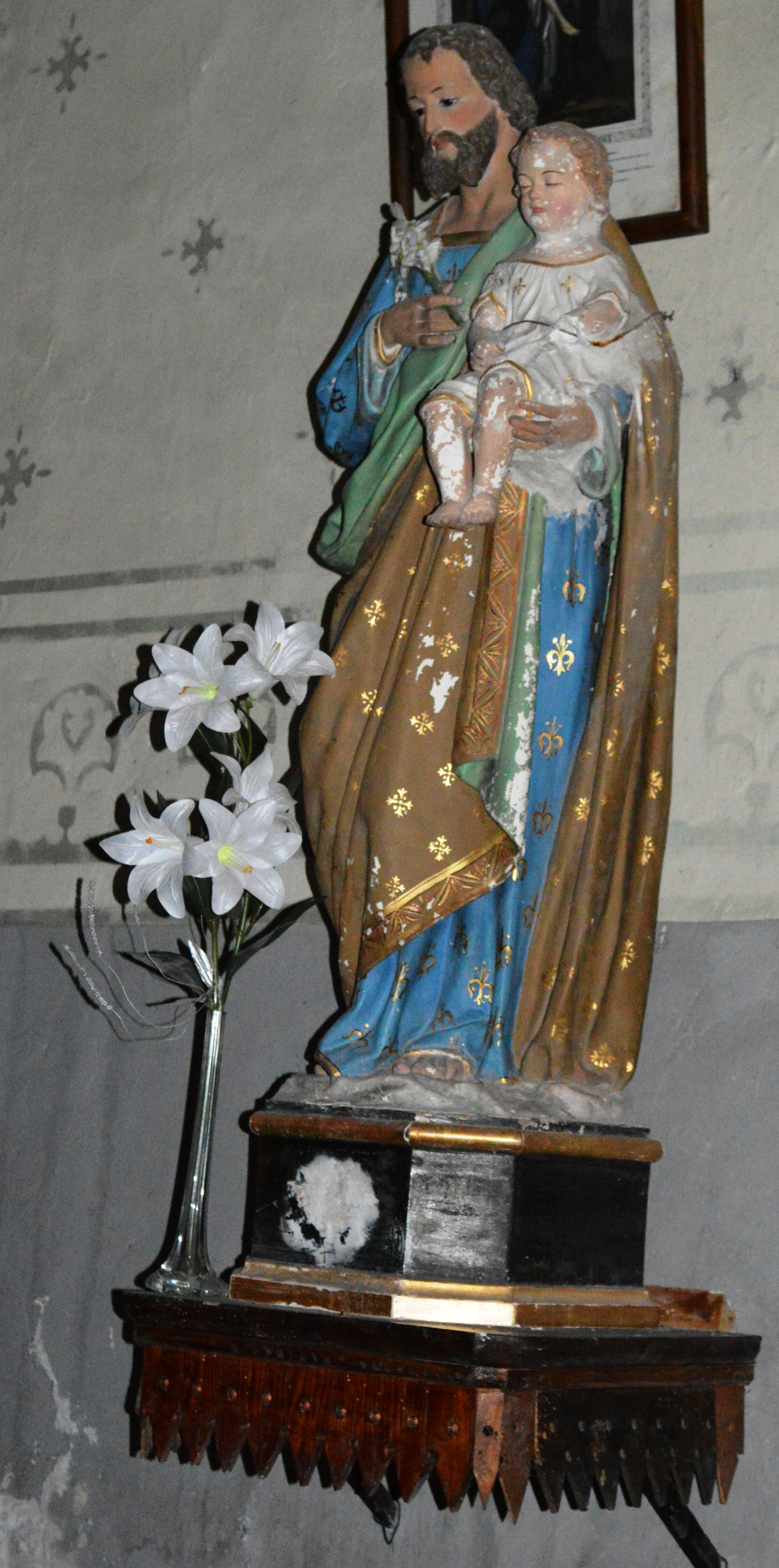
Statue: Saint Joseph

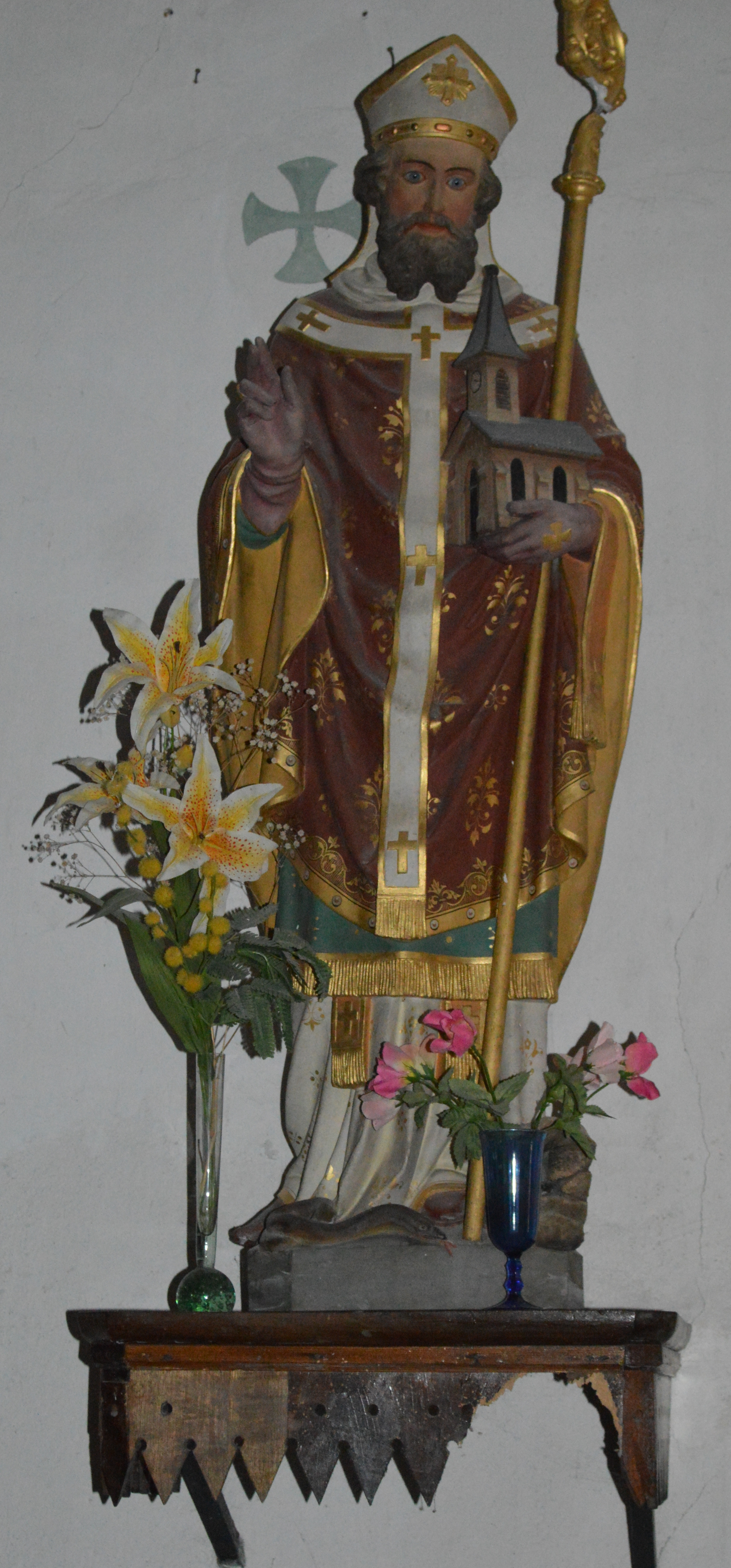
Statue: Saint Honorat

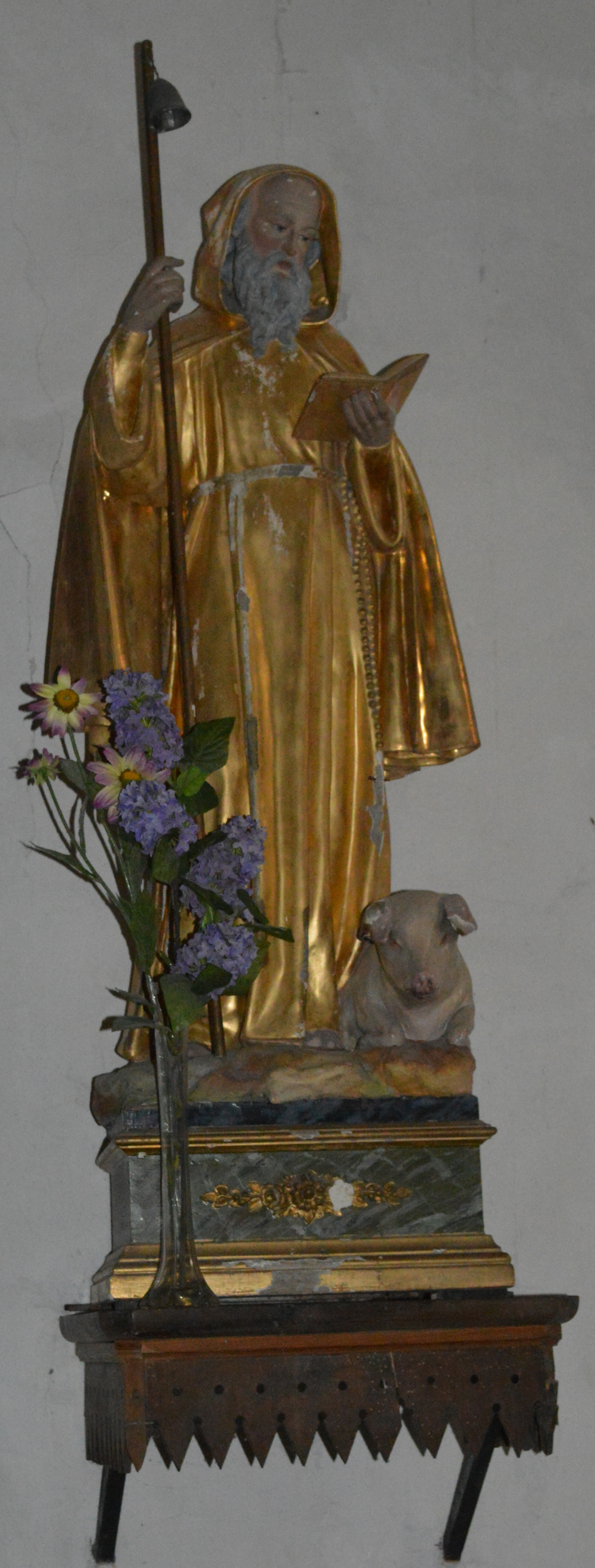
Statue: Saint Antoine

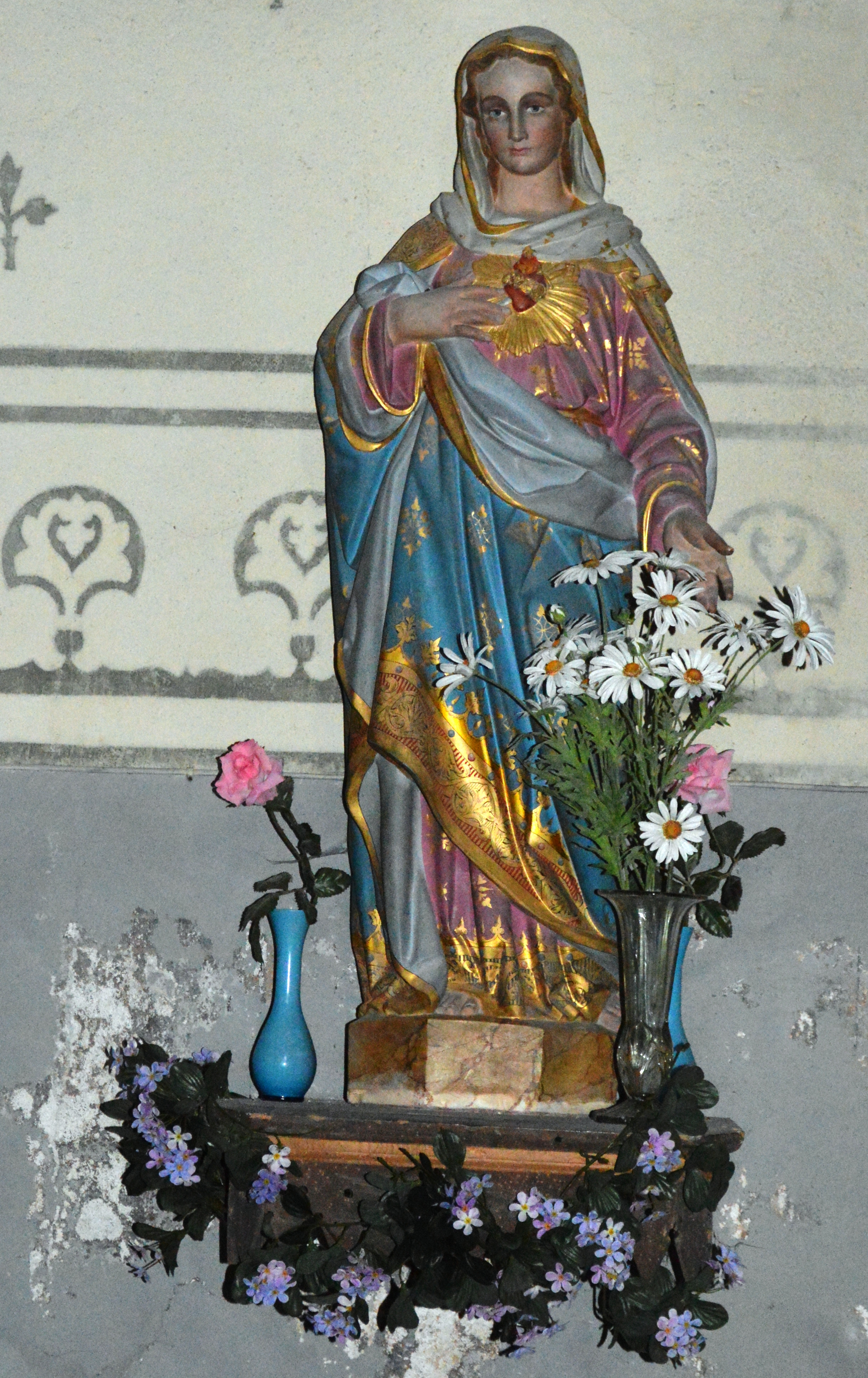
Statue: The Virgin

== See also ==
- Communes of the Alpes-de-Haute-Provence department

=== External links ===
- Angles on the National Geographic Institute website (in French)
- Angles on Géoportail, National Geographic Institute (IGN) website (in French)
- Angles on the 1750 Cassini Map
