= Baba Prithvirajendar Singh Bedi =

Indian skeet shooter

Baba Prithvirajendar Singh Bedi (born 1967) is an Indian professional skeet shooter and has represented India at the Commonwealth Games in 2006 in Australia and in Glasgow in 2014. He has represented India in several world cups and Asian shooting championships.
