= Vedanta (disambiguation) =

Vedanta is a school of philosophy in Hinduism.

Vedanta may also refer to:

- Vedanta Resources, a British mining and minerals group
- Vedanta Limited, an Indian mining company
- Vedanta University, India

== See also ==
- Vedantam (disambiguation)
- Veda (disambiguation)
