= Vedic (disambiguation) =

Vedic may refer to:

- The Vedas, the oldest preserved Indic texts
  - Vedic Sanskrit, the language of these texts
  - Vedic period, during which these texts were produced
  - Vedic pantheon of gods mentioned in Vedas
  - The historical Vedic religion, of which the Vedas record the liturgy
  - Vedic mythology, the mythological aspects of the historical Vedic religion and Vedas
  - Vedanga, "auxiliary disciplines" explaining the Vedas
- Upaveda, traditional Hindu disciplines of scholarship
  - Ayurveda (medicine)
  - Gandharvaveda (music)
  - Dhanurveda (martial arts)
  - Sthaptyaveda (architecture)
- In modern usage, anything loosely related to Hindu tradition
  - Hinduism in general
  - Vedic science (disambiguation)
  - Maharishi Vedic Approach to Health, based on Ayurveda
  - Bharati Krishna Tirtha's Vedic mathematics, system of mental calculation
  - Vedic University (disambiguation)
  - Vedic metal, music genre
- VE-DIC, video-enhanced differential interference contrast microscopy

== See also ==
- Veda (disambiguation)
- Vedic religion (disambiguation)
- Fifth Veda
- Vedic City, Iowa, now called Maharishi Vedic City, a small settlement in Iowa, USA
