= Pranava Veda =

Pranava Veda may be:

- following the Bhagavata Purana (9.14.48), the notion that in a primeval state, "Om was the Veda"
- allegedly, a "fifth Veda" followed by the Vishwakarma (caste)
- a notion of an "original Veda" of Mamuni Mayan
- a misspelling for Pranava-Vāda

== See also ==
- Pranav, an Indian male given name
