= Mitter Bedi =

Photographer

- Born: 26 January 1926; Lahore, British India
- Died: 11 March 1985 (aged 59); Mumbai, India
- Occupations: Photographer and teacher
- Known for: Industrial photography in black-and-white photographs and Academy in photography in Mumbai
- Children: Three daughters

Mitter Bedi (26 January 1926 – 11 March 1985) was an Indian photographer, specialising in industrial photography, and a teacher. Prior to his interest in the field there was little photographic use in advertising and his images have become classic icons. He was a recipient of several awards and he had his own photographic agency in Bombay (now Mumbai), which became well known in Asia.

== Early life ==
Mitter Bedi was born in Lahore, British India, on 26 January 1926. He studied at the D.A.V. School in Lahore from 1930 to 1940. He relocated to Bombay in 1940 and pursued his college education from the Vidyasagar College in Calcutta from 1940 to 1943. He married Sarla Goenka, and they had three daughters, Preeti, Jyoti, and Gayatri.

== Career ==
Bedi started his career by working for a printing press and the publicity department of a commercial firm and then took up a job in the film industry in 1947, the year of the partitioning of India and Pakistan into independent nations. At the start of his career in the early 1950s, his photographic assignments covered small events, mostly related to weddings and birthday celebrations or serving as the third or fourth assistant to a Bollywood film director. He frequented the airport to photograph passengers departing and arriving, which prompted his father-in-law B.N. Goenka, an industrialist, to suggest that Bedi change professions or travel abroad. However Bedi was firm in his resolve to continue in his chosen profession and said: "I am never going to leave the profession but bring it to the heights it deserves". In 1959 his photographic assignments saw a drastic change when he met Arthur D'Arzian, who had specialized in photography of the steel and oil industry, during a social function of the Standard Oil Company in Bombay. Bedi then pursued engagements of Industrial photography, a new field just taking off in the country.

Bedi's assignments covered public sector corporations and private enterprises. From 1960 to 1985, he traversed the industrial regions of India taking pictures. He took more than 2,000 photo shoots during the span of his career and covered projects from industries such as steel and oil, hospitality, mines, sugar, pharmaceuticals and many more. To propagate black-and-white photography as a profession in the country he wrote many articles and also established an academy in Bombay which is still operational under the direction of his family members. His photographs depicted a nation in which the factory and reactor dominated over the Indian people. He also worked as visiting professor in: K.C. College of Journalism, Bombay during 1974–75; National Institute of Design, Ahmedabad in 1976; in Rajednra Prasad Institute of Communication, Bombay in 1978; and in SNDT Women's University, Bombay, 1978. His academy in Bombay was a prominent institution in photography which enrolled national and international students and teachers.

Bedi's images have become classic icons of the industrialization which was carried out in India under Nehru. In spite of the limiting aspects of photographs taken primarily for advertising, Bedi introduced shape, design and geometric planes to create artistic rather than simply functional images. His visual expressions and artistry were used by both the state and industrialists to drive national development. An oeuvre of his black-and-white photographs taken during the period 1960s to 1970s, was held at the Piramal Centre for Photography representing an Art Form in Mumbai.

Bedi died in Bombay on 11 March 1985 due to a cardiac failure.

== Awards ==
Bedi's career achievements received acclaim through several awards. Some of the awards he received were: Two Kodak International Awards; nine Advertising Club Awards; and six Commercial Artists Guild (CAG) Awards. In 1984 he was honoured with CAG's "Photographer of the Year" award.

== Appreciation ==
Writing in The Hindu, Ranjit Hoskote observed:

It took the late Mitter Bedi's pioneering efforts to demonstrate that industrial photography had scope for creativity. Unwittingly, perhaps, he has also bequeathed us with a moving account of the bold initial success, and eventual tragic failure, of the Nehruvian idea of modernity

. Bedi's photographer friend Jehangir Gazdar stated in India Today:

It was in fact Bedi who almost single-handedly built up industrial photography in India. There are many others now, but he was the grandfather of them all. He started out from nothing to build a small-scale industry.

== Bibliography ==
- University, Cornell (January 2000). Business World. Ananda Bazar Patrika Limited.
- India, Press Institute of (1985). Vidura. C. Sarkar.
- Series, Contemporary arts (1982). Contemporary Photographers. St. Martin's Press. ISBN 978-0-312-16791-2.
- Thorner, Alice (2002). Land, Labour and Rights. Anthem Press. ISBN 978-1-84331-071-6.
