= Ved (mythology) =

Legendary creature

A ved is a mythological being recorded in the region of Bilogora in northern Croatia, predominantly among the region's speakers of the Kajkavian dialect. The vedi (plural) were described as male human-like creatures as high as a peasant house, completely covered with hair. They were very strong, able to uproot trees and carry heavy loads, while their chest was so large that they could make storms by blowing. When they spoke or sang, it was heard far away. They lived deep in the forests of Bilogora, where they built their towns, and were divided into tribes.

There were good and bad vedi. The latter did not associate with people and stayed in their forests, because of which they were also called the forest vedi. They normally did no harm to people, but if a bad ved encountered a young man in a forest, he would take him to his town and keep him as a slave for some time. The man would be often maltreated by his master, and eventually set free emaciated.

The good vedi visited people and helped them in their everyday work or troubles. Each household had its own ved who was very devoted to it, often to the extent that he did harm to other households and their vedi. If people expected a flood, storm, or other calamity, they would pray, "Grant, Oh God, that our vedi help us!" or "Dear God, grant that our vedi help us, and that their vedi do no harm to us!" Stories have it that after such prayers the vedi would quickly come to rescue.

Last accounts of vedi visiting people date from the mid 19th century. In the end only certain individuals were allegedly able to see them.
