= Gagandeep Singh Bedi =

Indian IAS Officer

- Born: 9 September 1968 (age 57); Punjab, India
- Education: Thapar Institute of Engineering and Technology
- Occupation: Bureaucrat

Gagandeep Singh Bedi (Hindi: गगनदीप सिंह बेदी, born 9 September 1968) is an Indian Administrative Service officer, currently serving as the Additional Chief Secretary (Municipal Administration and Water Supply Department) to the Government of Tamil Nadu in India. He is known for his crisis management and relief work at Cuddalore during the Tsunami in December 2004, floods in 2015 and the restoration of peace in the aftermath of Thoothukudi violence in May 2018. His work of coordination and controlling the COVID pandemic in Chennai as the Commissioner of Greater Chennai Corporation from 2021 to 2023 was widely acclaimed.

== Early life ==
Gagandeep Singh Bedi was born in Hoshiarpur, a city in the Indian state of Punjab, in 1968. He completed his B.E degree in Electronics and Electrical Communications at the Thapar Institute of Engineering and Technology.

== Career ==
Gagandeep Singh Bedi began his career as a lecturer at the Thapar Institute of Engineering and Technology from 1989 to 1991.

In 1991, he was selected for the Indian Engineering Services and got a posting in Indian Railways. In 1993, he cleared his IAS exam and was allotted Tamil Nadu Cadre. He was awarded the Subhash Dua Memorial Medal at LBSNAA, Mussoorie for his All Round Best Performance at the IAS Training Academy for the 1993 batch.

From 1999 to 2001, he worked as the Commissioner of Corporation in Madurai where he implemented the Ring Road Project successfully through First time floating of Municipal Bonds; he also successfully implemented the Mattuthavani Bus Stand Project.

From June 11, 2001, to July 15, 2003, Bedi was the District Collector of Kanyakumari. He was Awarded the Green Prize by Government of Tamil Nadu for his greening up activities in the district and drive against plastics in Kanyakumari.

He served as the District Collector of Cuddalore from July 16, 2003, to January 5, 2007. He led the entire Relief and Reconstruction process in the aftermath of 2004 Tsunami damages in the Coastal areas. His efforts were lauded by former US President Bill Clinton who spent a day with him as the UNICEF Goodwill ambassador; President A.P.J. Abdul Kalam also visited the district and acclaimed the efforts.

From 2007 to 2010, he served as Rural Development Commissioner of Tamil Nadu; from 2010 to 2011, Gagandeep Singh Bedi served as the managing director of the Tamil Nadu Water Supply and Drainage Board in Chennai. He became Secretary to Government for Animal Husbandary, Dairying and Fisheries Department from 2011 to 2013. He later served as the Secretary Revenue Department from 2013 to 2014 wherein he handled the sensitive Enquiry against Beach Sand Mining on behalf of Government of Tamil Nadu. Thereafter he worked as the Secretary of Rural Development and Panchayat Raj Department from 2014 to 2016 and Principal Secretary Agriculture of Tamil Nadu for a five-year period from 2016 to 2021. As Agriculture Secretary, his efforts to expand the Micro Irrigation in the State in a short span of time and broad base the Crop Insurance for the farmers, brought in fruitful results for the farmers.

In May 2021, Bedi assumed office as the New Greater Chennai Corporation Commissioner and directly handled the Covid epidemic in the city through the innovative projects like Home based triaging and Car Amulance system that was acclaimed by Govt of India Health Ministry.

After the reshuffle in 2023, Gagandeep Singh Bedi served as the Secretary of Health Department for more than a year before moving on to Rural development and Panchayati Raj department as Additional Chief Secretary. During this stint, Mr Bedi was made the Chairman of the Tamil Nadu Pension Committee, which finally recommended the implementation of the Tamil Nadu Assured Pension Scheme for the employees of the Government of Tamil Nadu.. After the new Government took over in May, 2026, Mr Bedi was appointed to the prestigious assignment of Additional Chief Secretary, Municipal Administration and Water Supply Department, which oversees the urban governance of over 24 Municipal Corporations including the city of Chennai, 146 Municipalities and over 480 Town Panchayats of Tamil Nadu, which is the most urbanised state of the country..

== Awards and recognitions ==
- The Outlook gave him the title of "Collector of Heroes" in view of his Tsunami Relief work in Cuddalore District;
- He was given NDTV's Award for "Outstanding Service to the Nation" in 2016 in view of the Relief works as Monitoring Secretary in Cuddalore Floods
- Director's Subhash Dua Memorial Gold medal for Best All-rounder Probationer at The IAS Training Academy
- National award for implementation of Mahatma Gandhi National Rural Employment Guarantee Scheme (MGNREGA) in 2016 given by the Prime Minister
- Green Award 2003 & 2004 by Govt of Tamil Nadu for his Greening up activities as Collector Kanyakumari and Cuddalore respectively
