= Bedding (animals) =

Bedding, in ethology and animal husbandry, is material, usually organic, used by animals to support their bodies when resting or otherwise stationary. It reduces pressure on skin, heat loss, and contamination by waste produced by an animal or those it shares living space with.

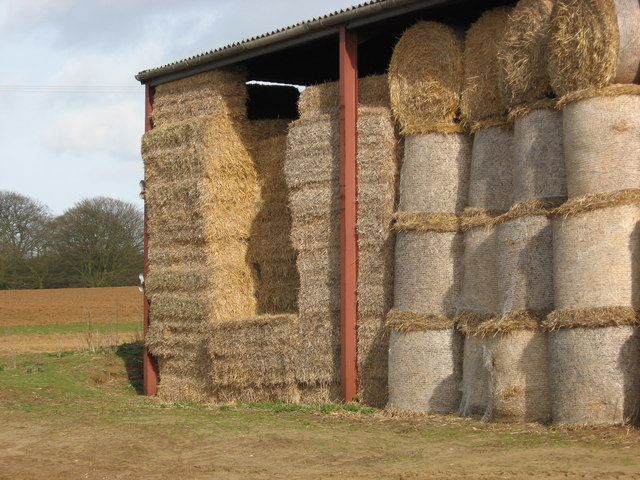
Straw is a commonly used bedding material

== Types of bedding ==
Wood shavings (pine, cedar, and aspen) are absorbent and have good odor control. Different textures such as fine cut, soft shreds, or thick cut are used for different animals. Wood shavings can be dusty and contain aromatic oils that can cause respiratory, gastrointestinal, urinary tract, or skin disorders and other health problems in some animals. Aspen and kiln-dried wood shavings tend to be less dusty, plus the oils are removed.

Hemp bedding is extremely absorbent and thus efficient, has good odor control and minimal dust, and provides more insulation than other bedding materials. Additionally, hemp is naturally pest-repellent and horses are not tempted to eat it. Due to its low dust, hemp bedding is recommended for horses with allergy or respiratory issues. From an environmental consideration, hemp is more sustainable than wood as it requires both less time and human intervention to grow repeatedly.

Corncob bedding contains no aromatic oils or dust. Corncobs are heat dried which makes it very absorbent. When water or urine is absorbed, the corncob will start molding so daily cleaning is needed. If not properly maintained, bacterial infections are likely to occur. Corncobs are cut to little pieces making it easy to ingest. This could be dangerous if ingested by a small animal.

Paper bedding includes either recycled paper or cardboard boxes. Paper bedding is ideal for animals with allergies since it contains no oils and little dust. Unlike corncob bedding, paper bedding has no adverse effects with consumption. Paper is very absorbent, but when saturated with water or urine, a strong odor results.

Straw is the soft, dry stalk of grain crops such as barley, oats, rice, rye, and wheat. Straw is easy to handle and available in most agricultural areas. When deciding to use a straw, is imperative to make sure that the straw is not palatable. To do this, the seed must be checked to ensure it is not available for consumption. Straw has excellent absorbency and is unlikely to mold.

Hay is composed of grasses that have been cut and then dried. Although hay is most commonly used for food, it also can be used for the purpose of animal bedding. This may result in an insufficient diet for the animal if it begins eating its bedding. In addition, old hay may give off dust that could result in respiratory problems. A disadvantage of using hay is that it is one of the more expensive beddings. It is quite absorbent but once it is soiled, it begins to decompose quickly producing an unpleasant odor. Because of the moisture, hay will mold quickly and could result in a bacterial infection.

Wood chips are a mixture of bark, sawdust, and post peelings. Agriculturalists use wood chips as cost-efficient bedding. While its cost may be desirable, woodchips provide minimal comfort and absorbency. Wood chips generate mold and mildew, because of their highly damp environment. This causes bacterial growth and potential infection if not changed often. Wood chips are also known to stain the coat of animals from bedding in moist chips.

Sawdust must be kiln-dried to ensure cleanliness and absorbency. Sawdust ensures quick and easy cleaning, because the soiled or wet material begins to clump together. Although the cleanup is easier, sawdust is known to create a lot of health problems such as respiratory, urinary tract, mastitis, and skin disorders.

Sand is ideal when looking at microbial growth. Sand is the most comfortable bedding because of its natural ability to form to the animal's curvature. However, large sand particles can cause abrasions and bruise on an animal. Sand is not very absorbent and makes soiled material difficult to clean up.

Waterbeds are used as an alternative to dried manure, sawdust, shells, or sand as bedding for dairy cattle, which produce less milk when they stand too long.

== Benefits of Bedding ==
Many animals benefit from bedding, including livestock, poultry, rodents and reptiles. Bedding, in the simplest context, provides comfort for these animals. When constructed properly, these cushioned structures decrease irritability and rough textures that can cause pain, pressure, and stress on the subject. This also prevents bruising and sores to preserve the physical beauty of the animal.

Bedding also creates an environment of moisture retention. Although incapable to prevent all microbial activity, bedding absorbs a substantial amount of moisture within the animal’s living environment. Soaking up excess urine, bedding assists in keeping the cage dry until the next change. A drier cage also promotes ventilation which decreases harmful levels of environmental pathogens.

These factors are few of many. With insulation against cold weather and drafts amongst the list, odor control sustains a position as well. Assistance in decreasing and filtering dust to protect against respiratory infections ranks high. Creating an environment conducive for thermoregulation and chemical resistance, along with simple privacy, bedding is ideal for many animal types. All these factors relay a decrease in stress and pain, encouraging peaceful resting opportunities that in turn increase the overall life, productivity, and well-being of the animal.

== Maintenance of Bedding ==
Bedding maintenance is an important part of both human and animal health, cleanliness, and animal wellbeing. Storage of bedding is important to insure that the bedding does not ruin. The best place to store it is in an environment that is dry and above ground level. Frequent bedding change is important to decrease the amount of bacteria. The most bacterial contaminated area is the front of the stall. This area should receive the most attention when cleaning and changing the bedding. Bedding should not be throughout the stall, it should be clear of the feeding and watering trough. It is recommended that the bedding is more frequently changed when there are a great number of animals, since the bedding will become contaminated faster.

Weather, frequent bedding maintenance, barn design, ventilation, and stall management influence bacteria levels. When one or several of these things change or are not met the susceptibility of potentially lethal illnesses significantly increases.

== Physochlaina: antiseptic/insecticidal cattle bedding in Pakistan ==
The dried foliage of the poisonous medicinal plant Physochlaina praealta (see page Physochlaina), a member of the Potato family, is used as a type of cattle bedding having antiseptic (and possibly also insecticidal) properties in the Baltistan region of northern Pakistan. A paper on investigations into the biological activities of the plant goes some way to support confidence in its possession of a chemistry adequate to explain such folk use, and could point to a potential for wider use outside its native range. The plant is an endangered species in the wild, but could be cultivated in mountainous regions with a cold, dry climate. It is a yellow-flowered, herbaceous perennial having some ornamental value in addition to its medicinal value. It contains (among other compounds) toxic tropane alkaloids valuable in the practice of human (as well as veterinary) medicine.
