= Herbert Arthur Popley =

- Born: 1879
- Died: 9 May 1960 (aged 80–81)
- Occupation: Christian missionary
- Known for: Translator of the Tirukkural

Herbert Arthur Popley (born c. 1879) was a Christian missionary of London Mission, Erode, known for his literary work as a translator of the Tirukkural and his skill in rendering Tamil Christian music in the Carnatic style. He was secretary of the All-India Y.M.C.A. At the time of his death, he was president of the local Y.M.C.A. and a director of the Coonoor Co-operative Urban Bank Ltd. He died in Coonoor on 9 May 1960 at the age of 81.

== Tirukkural translation ==
At the suggestion of the then general editor of the Heritage of India Series, Calcutta, J. N. Farquhar, Popley started translating selections of the Tirukkural into English and published the work in 1931 with the Y. M. C. A. Publishing House. Translated in verse, the work was titled The Sacred Kural or The Tamil Veda of Tiruvalluvar. The work contained translations of 346 couplets of the Kural text, including 194 from Book I (virtue), 135 from Book II (wealth), and 17 from Book III (love). In 1958, the second edition with revised translations was published, which contained translations of 511 couplets, including 299 from Book I, 190 from Book II, and 22 from Book III. The work includes a detailed introduction and explanatory notes quoting translators such as W. H. Drew, G. U. Pope, V. V. S. Aiyar, and A. Chakravarti, in addition to a bibliography citing various European language translations of the Kural text.

His other publication includes The Music of India, published in the Heritage of India Series, Calcutta.

== See also ==
- Tirukkural translations
- Tirukkural translations into English
- List of translators into English
