= Tirukkural translations into Odia =

By 2017, there were at least six translations of the Tirukkural in Odia, all published after the 1970s.

== History of translations ==
The first translation of the Kural text in Odia appeared in 1978 by Chittaranjan Das, which was published by Bharatiya Vidya Bhavan in Bhubaneswar. The list of Kural translations in Odia appears in the following table.

No.	Year	Translator	Title	Location and Publisher	Notes
1	1978	Chittaranjan Das	Kural [Oriya]	Bhubaneswar: Bharatiya Vidya Bhavan	Appeared in 154 pages.
2	1985	Kshirod Dash	Tirukkuralu	Sambalpur	A translations in verse
3	1992	Nityanada Acharya	Tirukkural: Book of Sacred Couplets	Balangir, Orissa: Agragami Karyalaya	Translated only the first two parts (Virtue and Wealth)
4	1994	Gananath Das		Cuttack: Vidyapuri Publishers	Complete translation in verse. Based on the Hindi translation of Tirukkural by M. G. Venkatakrishnan
5	1996	Biswanath Misra	Tirukkural	Bhubaneswar	
6	2017	Balaram Rout	Thirukkural	Delhi (Sahitya Akademi)	

G. N. Das's translation is based on the Hindi translation of the Tirukkural by M. G. Venkatakrishnan, and is also influenced by the English translations by P. S. Sundaram and Drew–Lazarus and Sanskrit translation by S. N. Srirama Desikan. Das retired from his IAS career in 1972, after which he took to studying saintly literatures, especially that of Kabir. In 2017, Balaram Rout made another translation, which was published by Sahitya Akademi in Delhi.

In 2022, as part of its Ancient Tamil Classics in Translations series, the Central Institute of Classical Tamil (CICT) in Chennai released its Odia translation of the Kural by Giribala Mohanty.

== See also ==
- Tirukkural translations
- List of Tirukkural translations by language

== Published Translations ==
- G. N. Das. (1997). Thirukkural in Oriya (Foreword by S. Sundararajan). Cuttack: Vidyapuri.
