= Edward Jewitt Robinson =

British Missionary

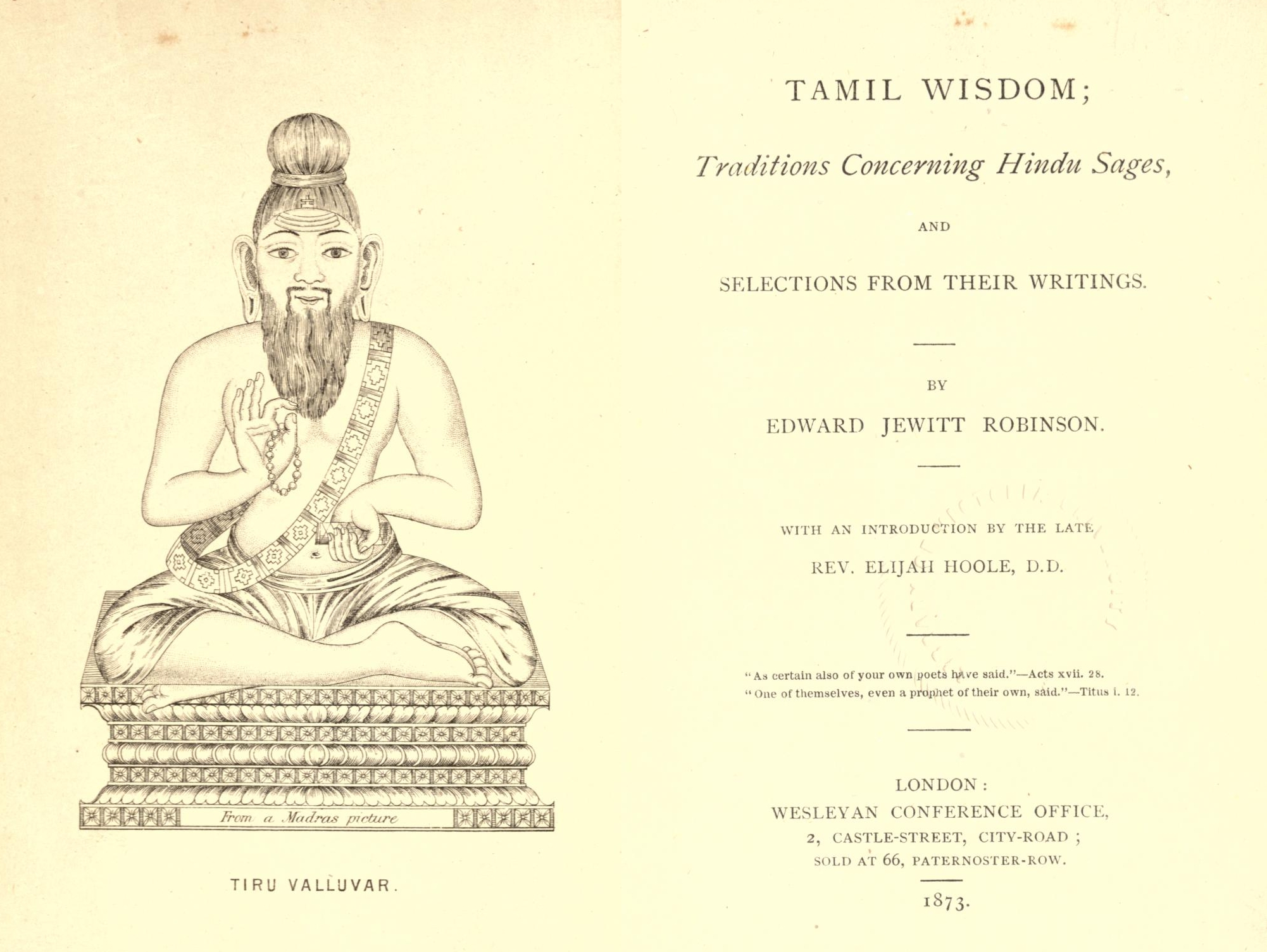
Tamil Wisdom, by Edward Jewitt Robinson, 1873, with the traditional Shaivite portrait of Valluvar in the frontispiece

Edward Jewitt Robinson was a 19th-century Protestant missionary to British India. He is best known as one of the earliest translators of the Tirukkural into English.

== Biography ==
Edward Jewitt Robinson was a missionary of the Wesleyan Methodists in Ceylon. Robinson published a collection of ancient Tamil texts, including the Tirukkural, translated into English in 1873. The work was titled Tamil Wisdom. Facilitating the evangelical works of the missionaries like Constanzo Beschi, Ziegenbalg, and Percival, Robinson published an enlarged version of the work under the title Tales and Poems of South India in 1885. In the preface of his second work, he acknowledged the earlier translations by F. W. Ellis, W. H. Drew, Karl Graul and Charles E. Gover.

Robinson, like other earlier missionaries, translated only the first (Aram) and second books (Porul) of the Kural text, translating 108 chapters (1080 couplets) in verse. He did not translate the third book (Inbam). His English contemporaries greatly praised his verse translation, although native scholars of later years, such as T. P. Meenakshisundaram, had some reservations about its fidelity to the original.

George Uglow Pope, in his preface to The Sacred Kurral, felicitated Robinson thus:

Since this work was sent to the press, I have seen a charming little volume entitled, Tales and Poems of South India, from the Tamil, by Rev. E. J. Robinson (T. Woolmer, 1885). Had I known of this earlier, I should have felt it less necessary to publish a translation.

== Other works ==
Robinson published Hindu Pastors: A Memorial in London in 1867, when he was with Late Wesleyan Missionary in Ceylon. His other works include:

- The daughters of India : their social condition, religion, literature, obligations, and prospects (1860)
- Lay representation in the Wesleyan Conference (1871)
- The mother of Jesus not the papal Mary (1875)
- Led by the spirit : memoirs of Mrs. Caroline Eliza Walker : compiled chiefly from her own records and letters (1882)

== See also ==
- Tirukkural translations
- Tirukkural translations into English
- List of translators into English
