= K. M. Balasubramaniam =

Tamil writer and translator (died 1974)

- Died: 1974
- Occupations: Political activist, writer
- Known for: Translating Thiruvasagam and Tirukkural into English

K. M. Balasubramaniam (died 1974) was a Tamil writer and supporter of the Dravidian Movement, and a translator of the Tirukkural into English. He came to be known as Thiruvachakamani for his translation of Manikkavacakar’s Thiruvasagam into English before translating the Kural text.

== Biography ==
Balasubramaniam was an advocate and an ardent supporter and one of the prominent lieutenants of 'Periyar' E. V. Ramasamy (founder of Dravidar Kazhagam) and subsequently became a collaborator of 'Perarignar' C. N. Annadurai (founder of Dravida Munnetra Kazhagam). He was arrested and was sent to prison for six months in 1938 for his involvement as one of the five-member executive committee formed to spearhead the 1937-40 anti-Hindi agitation. Later, along with former chief minister of Tamil Nadu C. N. Annadurai, he accompanied Periyar to Bombay to discuss the idea of ‘Dravida Nadu’ (Dravidian land) with Mohammed Ali Jinnah. Later, he became a spiritualist, delving deep into philosophy and Saivite literature. Balasubramaniam was proficient in both Tamil and English. According to V. S. Srinivas Shastri, Balasubramaniam was a master of idiomatic, humorous and highly cultivated expressions.

Dravidian historian K. Thirunavukarasu said that for an atheist, who moved the resolution in support of atheism at the self-respect conference in Tirunelveli, the transformation was something beyond comprehension. He has commented, "I have read that when a team of Dravidian leaders including Balasubramaniam went to meet Jinnah, they also took B. R. Ambedkar with them. Later I have listened to his Thiruvachagam lecture."

== Translating Thiruvachagam and Tirukkural ==
Balasubramaniam translated Manikkavacakar’s Thiruvasagam into English and published it in 1958, which made him know widely as Thiruvachakamani. Of the 500 copies that he published, half were sold in South Africa. The preface to the book was written by the then Home Minister Bhaktavatsalam.

When Sarvapalli S. Radhakrishnan, then vice-president of India, attended Balasubramaniam’s public lecture on Periyapuranam at the Kapaleeswarar temple in Chennai on 13 May 1961, he requested Balasubramaniam to translate the Tirukkural into English, just as the latter rendered Thiruvachagam into English. Balasubramaniam said he was on the job and in turn expressed his wish that Radhakrishnan become president. Incidentally, the wish came true exactly a year later, on 13 May 1962. The same year Balasubramaniam released his completed work on the Kural text, for which Radhakrishnan wrote the preface. Although Balasubramaniam appreciated his predecessor G. U. Pope’s translation of the Kural text, he considered that Tamils had the ante-natal advantage of a common nativity and closer affinity with Mancikavachagar.

Balasubramaniam’s translation is considered by many as more comprehensive and poetic than the earlier translations of the Kural text. The publisher of the translation work ‘Sivalayam’ J. Mohan, who also published Balasubramaniam’s Thiruvachagam, said of Balasubramaniam thus: "In Tamil literature, commentators with felicity of expression matching the original authors were placed on a par with them. K.M. Balasubramaniam was one such commentator." According to Suddhananda Bharathi, another English translator of the Kural text, Balamasubramaniam "takes the ideas of Valluvar, and embellishes them, so the reader needs no other commentary." In his preface to the book, Czech scholar Kamil Zvelebil said, "at last the English-speaking world will be in possession of a poetic translation of Tirukkural, in possession of an able rendering of this unique Tamil classic into English verse, which is without exaggeration and almost adequate to the original." In his translation, Balasubramaniam also translated the commentaries of Parimelazhagar, Manakkudavar, and Kalingarayar into English, drawing from parallels in the works of the Bible, the Koran, Shakespeare, Milton, Alexander Pope, Dryden, George Herbert, Francis Bacon and Dr. Johnson. This can be corroborated from the fact that more than half of the 530 pages in the book are dedicated to detailed notes.

Following his Kural translation, Balasubramaniam then started translating Sekkizhar’s Periyapuranam, the history of 63 Saivite saints, into English, but his death in 1974 made it incomplete.

== See also ==
- Tirukkural translations
- Tirukkural translations into English
- List of translators into English
