= Manapad =

Manapad Manavai
- village
- Location in Tamil Nadu, India Manapad (India)
- Coordinates: 8°22′39″N 78°3′8″E
- Country: India
- State: Tamil Nadu
- District: Tuticorin

Languages
  - Official: Tamil
- Time zone: UTC+5:30 (IST)
- PIN: 628 209
- Nearest city: Tuticorin
- PARLIAMENT constituency: Tuticorin
- Legislative constituency: Tiruchendur
- Website: manapad.in

Manapad is a coastal village in south India, 60 kilometres (37 mi) from Tuticorin and 18 km (11 mi) south of Tiruchendur.

St. Francis Xavier came to Manapad in 1542, conducting missionary activity on the Pearl Fishery Coast. He lived in a grotto cavern on the seaward face of a cliff and held mass at a chapel of the Captain's Cross, built close to the sea from a ship's mast after a storm in 1540. In 1581, the grotto was built into a big Church, when Fr John de Salanova was the Parish Priest of Queen of Heaven Church, Manapad. In 1583, The relic of the True Cross, sent by Pope Gregory XIII, arrived at Manapad, after a grand tour along the coastal belt with halts in the places of Catholic predominance. Every year, from 1st to 14th of September, the relic of the True Cross is publicly displayed to thousands who attend the festival season. Pope Leo XIII, in one of his writings mentions Manapad as "Little Jerusalem" (5 April 1889).

Valliamman cave is located nearby.

== History ==
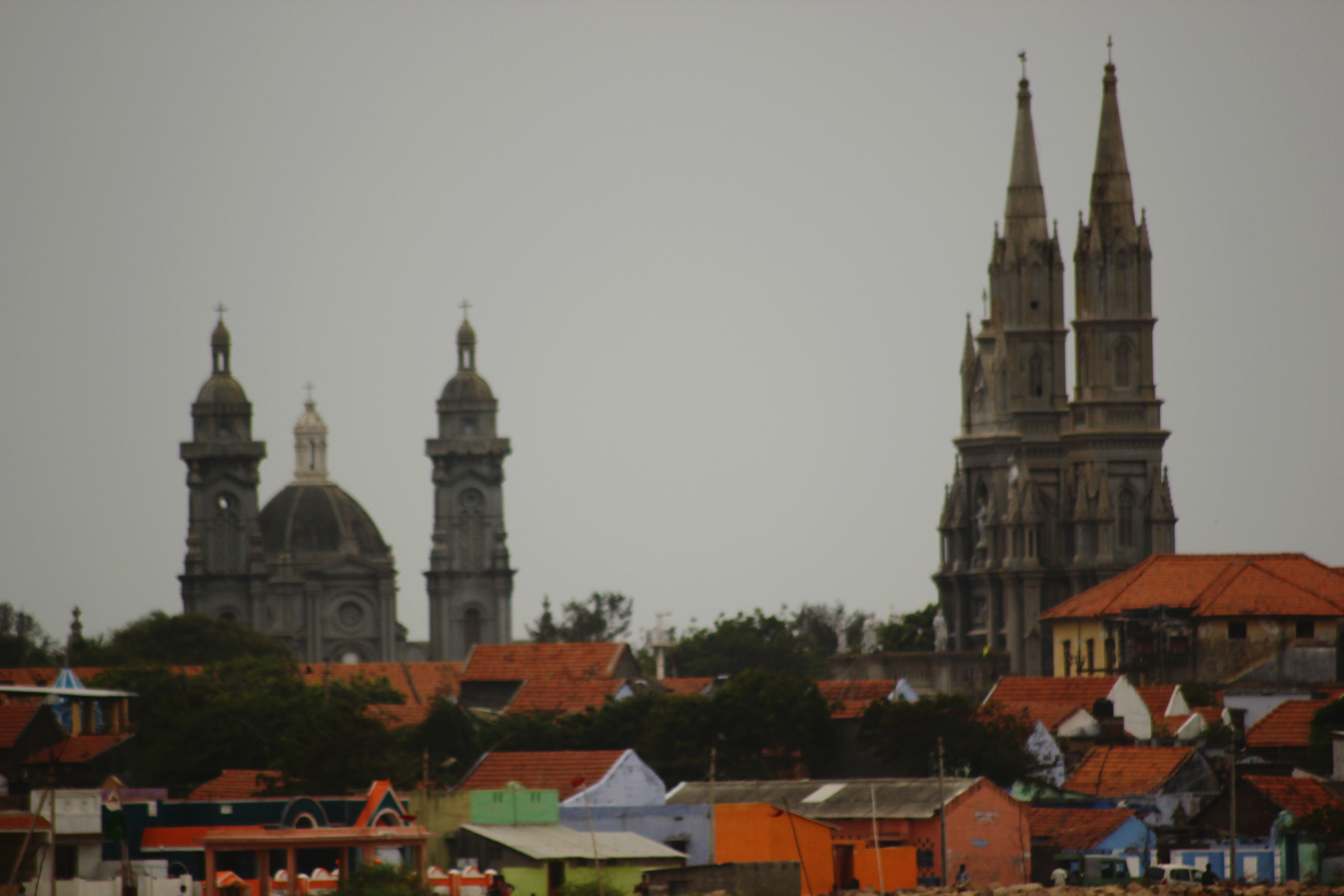
The Catholic church

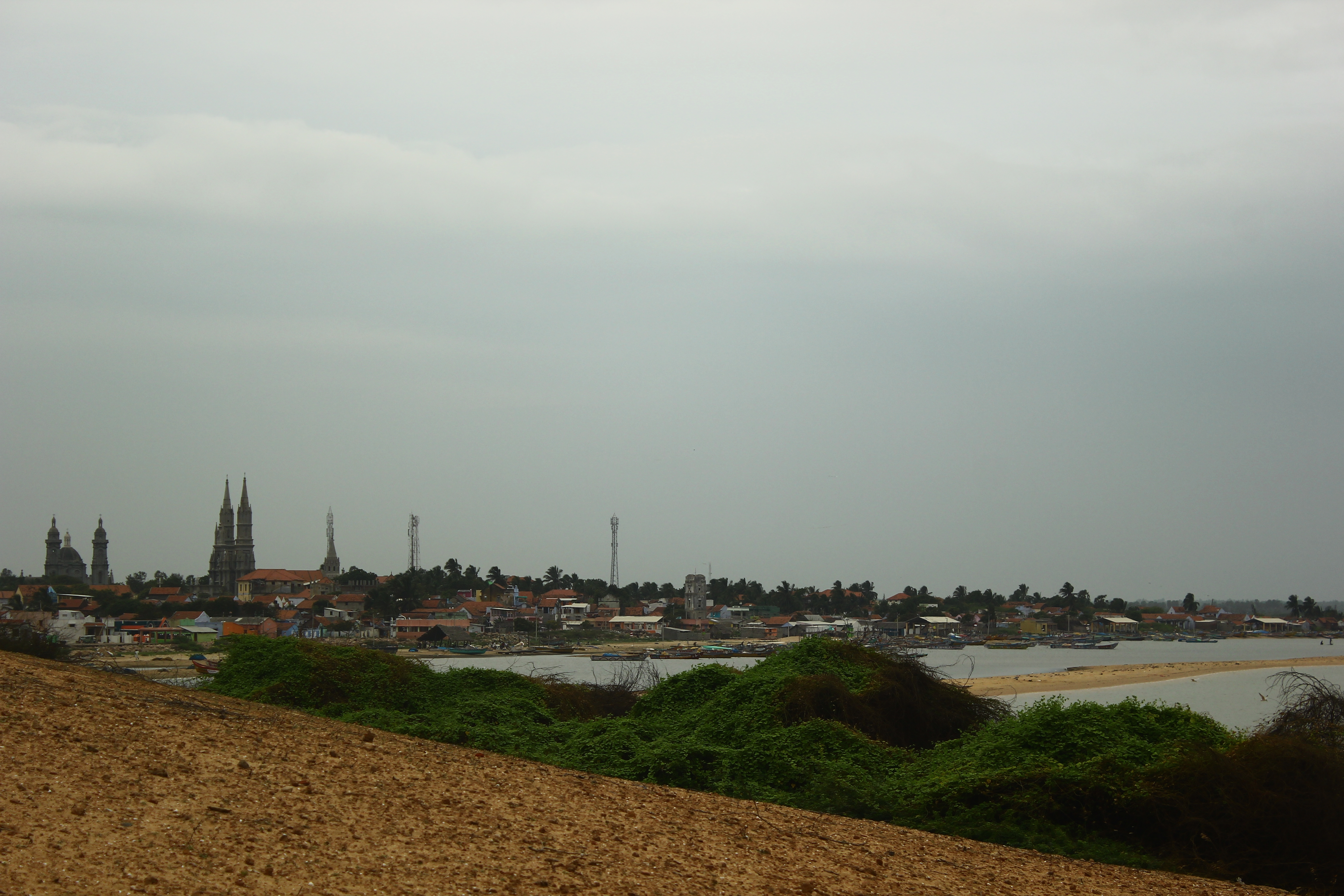
A view of Manapad

Traditional stories say that in 1540, a Portuguese trading vessel, while sailing around the Cape of Good Hope on its way to the East, encountered a violent storm splitting its sails and snapping the hind mast, leaving it at risk of foundering. The captain, who was devoted to the veneration of the Holy Cross, implored and entrusted the safety of the vessel and that of the crew to Christ. He made a vow that he would construct a cross from a portion of the splintered mast and have it planted on the shore where they alighted in safety. By chance, the vessel, after having drifted for several days, sought haven at the port of Kulasekharapatnam.The economy depends on the sea and palms. Fishermen take care of catching fish and mending nets. Palm neera is extracted from the palm trees and is often used to make jaggery or blackcurrant. Palm leaves are made into baskets and beautiful handicrafts. Quality handicrafts are purchased through a cooperative society and exported to the uplands.There are two streets in Manapadu village where the Nadar caste people live, Pudukkudiyettru Street and Samiyarkudiyettru Street. These two streets are also called Nadar Street or Nadar Kudi. There are Christians and Hindus.

== Culture ==
=== Festivals ===
The festival of the Exaltation of the Holy Cross is celebrated annually by the Catholic Church on 14 September. It is a Portuguese tradition to lay the cross in the places where they live. This festival has been celebrated for generations over centuries.

=== Cinema ===
The movie Neethaane En Ponvasantham had a climax shootout there and the coverage exposed the place to many Tamil people.

A major part of Maniratnam's Kadal movie was shot in Manapad.

Singam II has some parts pictured at this church premises. Many short films were shot there.

A major part of Seenu Ramaswamy's Neerparavi was shot in Manapad.

A major part of SP Jananathan's Iyarakai movie was shot in Manapad.

Certain portions of Shoojit Sircar's Madras Cafe were shot in this town.

And neer paravai and iyerkai movie

== Notable people ==
- S. M. Diaz IPS
- Donatus Victoria
