= Charles E. Gover =

British folklorist in India

Charles Edward Gover
- Born: 1835; Poplar, Middlesex, England
- Died: 18 September 1872 (aged 36–37); Madras, India
- Occupation: Folklorist
- Known for: One of the earliest translators of Tirukkural into English
- Spouse: Clara Gertrude Taylor
- Children: 5
- Father: Thomas Gover

Charles Edward Gover (1835–1872) was a British folklorist in Madras (present-day Chennai), India. He was one of the earliest translators of the Tirukkural into English.

== Life ==
Gover was the son of Thomas Gover of Poplar, Middlesex. In 1864, he was appointed principal and secretary of the Madras Military Male Orphan Asylum at Egmore, Chennai. In 1868, he became a member of the Royal Asiatic Society, but withdrew in 1871–1872. He was a member of the Society of Arts and a fellow of the Anthropological Society.

Gover married Clara Gertrude Taylor in 1863 and had five children with her. Gover died of a haemorrhage on 18 September 1872 in Madras, and was buried at St Andrew's Church there.

== Works ==
Gover wrote a pamphlet on "Indian Weights and Measures, their condition and remedy" (Madras, 1865). During 1866, he communicated to the Asiatic Society a paper on "The Pongol Festival in Southern India" (Journal, new ser. v. 91–118), where he asserted without proof that the festival was a remnant of primitive Aryan life. Another contribution was an account of the moral condition and religious views of the caste system in southern India, mainly based on a collection of popular songs in ancient Canarese, of which he gave specimens in a poetical English version.

Gover also wrote essays on Indian folklore for the Cornhill Magazine. Under the title The Folk-Songs of Southern India, he collected his essays in 1872. In this book, he translated select couplets of the Tirukkural into English in verse and published it under the title "Odes from the Kural". He was the fourth translator of the Kural text into English, after Nathaniel Edward Kindersley, Francis Whyte Ellis, and William Henry Drew.

Philologists have discredited his hypothesis that, driven into the extreme south of India, and cut off from intercourse with other peoples, the Dravidian nations have preserved their original vocabulary, and that true Dravidian roots, common to the three major branches, Tamil, Telugu, and Canarese, are pure Aryan.

== See also ==
- Tirukkural translations
- Tirukkural translations into English
- List of translators into English
