= Tirukkural translations into English =

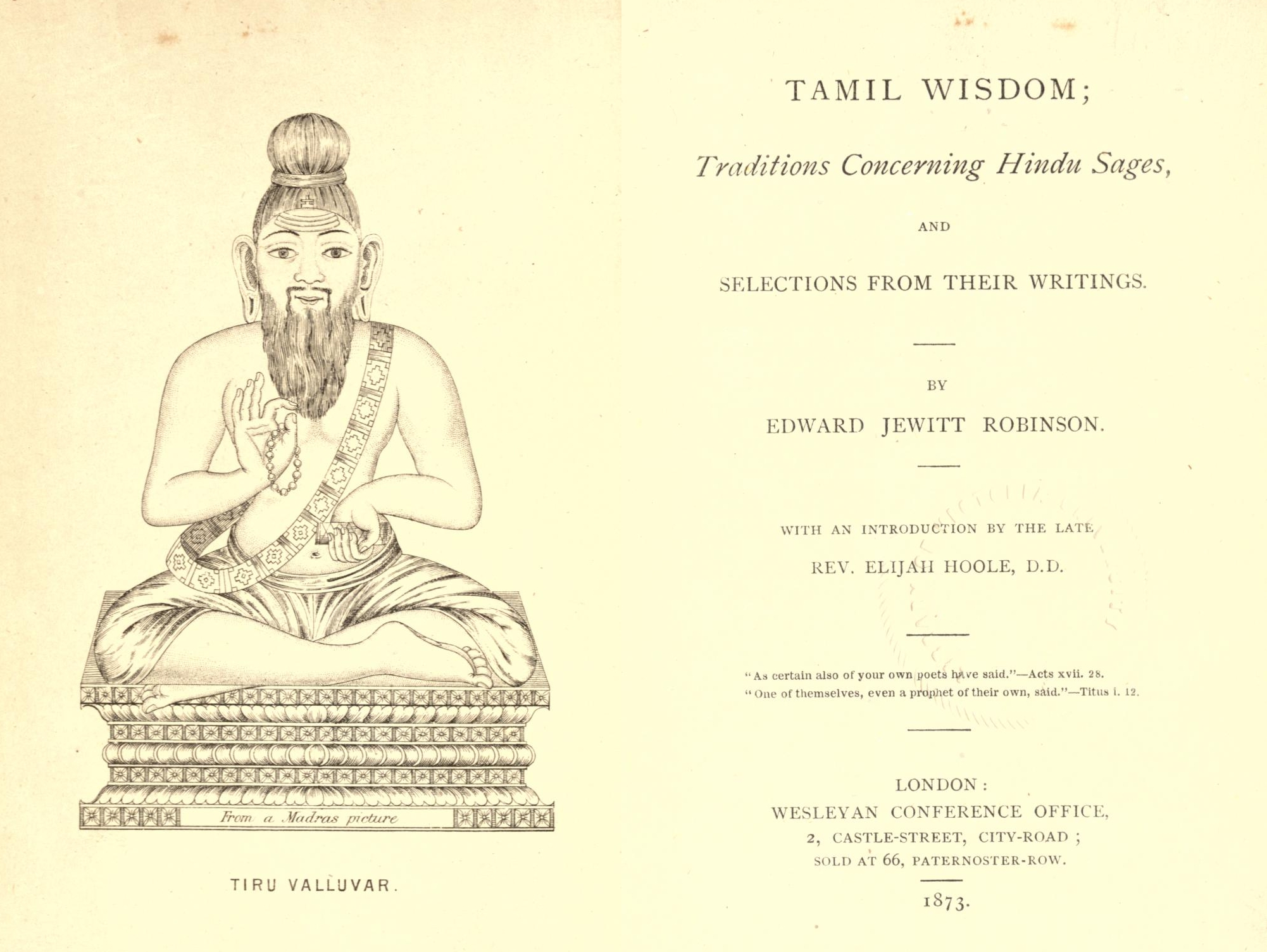
Tamil Wisdom, by Edward Jewitt Robinson, 1873

Tirukkural remains one of the most widely translated non-religious works in the world. As of 2014, there were at least 57 versions available in the English language alone. English, thus, continues to remain the language with most number of translations available of the Kural text.

== List of translations ==
Below is a list of English translations of the Tirukkural till date:

S.No.	Year	Translator(s)	Title of the Translation	Place of Publication	Form	Coverage	Notes
125	1794	Nathaniel Edward Kindersley	Specimens of Hindoo Literature	London (W. Bulmer and Co.)	Verse	Selections	Made the first ever translation of the Kural text into English in a chapter titled 'Extracts from the Teroo-Vaulaver Kuddul, or, The Ocean of Wisdom' in his book Specimens of Hindoo Literature
126	1812/1819	Francis Whyte Ellis	Tirukkural		Verse and Prose	Selections	Translated 120 couplets in all—69 of them in verse and 51 in prose. Second edition published by University of Madras Press in 1955 as Tirukkural Ellis Commentary
127	1840	William Henry Drew	The Cural of Tiruvalluvar (Kural 1–630)	Madurai (American Mission Press)	Prose	Partial	Reprints were in 1852, 1962, and 1988 by Kazhagam (Madras) and Asian Educational Services (AES) (New Delhi)
128	1872	Charles E. Gover	Odes from the Kural (Folksongs of South India)	Madras (Higginbothams)	Verse	Selections	Reprint by Gian Publications (Delhi) in 1981
129	1873	Edward Jewitt Robinson	Tamil Wisdom	London (Paternoster Row)	Verse	Partial	Revised edition in 1885 as Tales and Poems of South India; 1st reprint in 1975 by Kazhakam (Madras) and 2nd in 2000 by TNR (Tanjore)
130	1885	John Lazarus	Tirukkural (Kural 631–1330)	Madras (Murugesa Mudaliar)	Prose	Partial	Reprint in 1988 by AES (New Delhi)
131	1886	George Uglow Pope	The Sacred Kurral of Tiruvalluva Nayanar	London (Henry Frowde)	Verse	Complete	Reprint in 1980 by AES (New Delhi)
132	1915	T. Thirunavukkarasu	Tirukkural: A Gem for Each Day	Madras (SPCK Press)	Prose	Selections	Translated only 366 couplets
133	1916	V. V. S. Aiyar	The Kural or The Maxims of Tiruvalluvar	Madras (Amudha Nilayam Private Ltd.)	Prose	Complete	Reprints in 1925, 1952, 1961, and 1982 by Tirupparaitturai Sri Ramakrishna Tapovanam (Tiruchirapalli)
134	1919	T. P. Meenakshisundaram					Published the 1904 work of K. Vadivelu Chettiar with English renderings. Republished in 1972–1980 in Madurai as Kural in English with Tamil Text and Parimelazhakar Commentary (3 parts). Recent edition published in 2015 in 2 volumes.
135	1920	S. Sabaratna Mudaliyar	Kural	Madras			
136	1924	G. Vanmikanathan	The Tirukkural: A unique guide to moral, material and spiritual prosperity	Madras (Rathina Nayakkar & Sons)	Prose	Complete	Published again in 1969 in Tiruchirappalli by the Tirukural Prachar Sangh.
137	1926	A. Madhavaiyya	Kural in English	Madras	Verse	Selections	Possibly published earlier in 1923
138	1928	T. V. Parameswaran Aiyar	108 Gems from the Sacred Kural	Kottayam (Jagadamba Vidhya Vihar)		Selections	
139	1928	Unnamed author	Jeevakarunya Thirukkural Selections	Karaikkudi (Kumaran Co. Publishers)		Selections	
140	1929	S. Somasundara Bharathiyar	Tiruvalluvar: English translation in Tamil lectures	Madurai (Madurai Tamil Sangam)			Republished in 1966 by Navalar Somasundara Bharatiyar Trust, Chennai
141	1931	Herbert Arthur Popley	The Sacred Kural or The Tamil Veda of Tiruvalluvar	Calcutta (The Heritage of India Series)	Verse	Selections	Reprint in 1958 by YMCA Publishing House (Calcutta)
142	1933	A. Ranganatha Mudaliar	Tirukkural Mulamum Uraiyum with English Translation	Madras			
143	1935	C. Rajagopalachari	Kural, The Great Book of Tiruvalluvar	Madras (Rochouse and Sons Ltd.)	Prose	Selections	Translated only select couplets from Books I and II. Reprints in 1937, 1965, and 1973
144	1942	M. S. Purnalingam Pillai	The Kural in English	Tirunelveli (Sri Kanthimathi Vilasam Press)	Prose	Complete	Reprints in 1999 and 2007 by IITS (Chennai)
145	1946	S. M. Michael	The Sacred Aphorisms of Thiruvalluvar	Nagercoil (The Grace Hut)	Verse	Complete	Reprint in 1968 by M. S. Raja (Sattur)
146	1949	V. R. Ramachandra Dikshitar	Tirukkural	Madras (The Adayar Library and Research Centre)	Prose	Complete	Reprints in 1994 and 2000
147	1950	M. R. Rajagopala Aiyangar	Tirukkural	Kumbakonam	Prose	Complete	
148	1950	P. Raja	Thirukkural (in verses)	Kumbakonam	Verse		
149	1953	A. Chakravarti	Tirukkural	Madras (The Diocesan Press, Vepery)	Prose	Complete	
150	1954	I. D. Thangaswamy	Tirukkural	Madras	Verse	Selections	
151	1955	Issac T. Thangaiya	Thirukkural in English with Parimelazhakar Commentary	Madras			
152	1962	K. M. Balasubramaniam	Tirukkural of Tiruvalluvar	Madras (Manali Lakshmana Mudaliar Specific Endowments)	Verse	Complete	
153	1965	T. Muthuswamy	Tirukkural: The Gospel of Mankind	Madurai (Vivekananda Press)	Prose	Partial	
154	1967	V. Chinnarajan	The Kural Gems	Udumalpet	Verse	Selections	
155	1968	C. R. Soundararajan			Prose	Complete	
156	1968	Emmons E. White	The Wisdom of India	New York City (The Pater Pauper)	Verse	Selections	Also published as The Wisdom of the Tamil People in 1976
157	1968	Shuddhananda Bharati	Tirukkural	Madras (Kazhakam)	Verse	Complete	Also published a complete prose version in 1970
158	1969	Kasturi Srinivasan	Tirukkural	Bombay (Bharatiya Vidya Bhavan)	Verse	Complete	Reprints in 1976 and 1983 by Kasthuri Sreenivasan Trust (Coimbatore)
159	1969	A. Gajapathy Nayagar	The Rosary of Gems of Tirukkural	Madras			
160	1970	Shuddhananda Bharati	Tirukkural		Prose	Complete	
161	1971	T. N. S. Ragavachari	Teachings of Tiruvalluvar's Kural	Madras (Health, June 1966 to October 1971)	Prose	Complete	Reprinted in 1982
162	1972	S. R. V. Vasu	Voice of Valluvar: A Modern Commentary of the Kural	Madras (Thayakam)		Selection	Selection of about 200 couplets; 90 pages
163	1975	E. V. Singan	Tirukkural	Singapore (EVS Enterprises)	Prose	Complete	Reprinted in 1982
164	1978	S. N. Sriramadesikan	Tirukkural	Madras (Gangai Puthaka Nilayam)	Prose	Complete	Reprinted in 1991, 1994 and 2006
165	1979	S. Maharajan	Tiruvalluvar	New Delhi (Sahitya Akademi)	Verse	Selections	Translated select couplets from all the three books of the Kural text. Second edition was published in 1982
166	1979	Satguru Sivaya Subramuniya Swami	Thirukural/Weavers Wisdom	New Delhi (Abhinav Publications)/(Himalayan Academy Publications)	Verse	Partial	Translated only Books I and II; published again in 2000
167	1981	K. C. Kamaliah	Sacred Kural: The Kindly Light	Tirunalveli (South India Saiva Siddhanta Works Publishing Society)			
168	1982	S. M. Diaz	Tirukkural	Coimbatore (Ramananda Adigalar Foundation)	Verse	Complete	Reprinted in 2000
169	1985	S. Jagathratchagan	Thirukkural: English Rendering	Madras (Apollo Publications)		Complete	291 pages
170	1985	K. Chokkalingam	Thirukkural: Aratthuppaal	Jaffna (Sri Subramaniya Puthaka Salai)		Partial	Translated only Book I
171	1987	C. Rajasingham	Thirukkural: The Daylight of the Psych	Chennai (International Institute of Tamil Studies)		Partial	Translated the first 9 chapters
172	1987	P. S. Sundaram	Tiruvalluvar: The Kural	New Delhi (Penguin Books India Limited)	Verse	Complete	Reprinted in 1989, 1991, 1992 and 2000 by International Tamil Language Foundation (Illinois)
173	1987	T. S. Ramalingam Pillai					
174	1987	K. N. Subramanyan	Tiruvalluvar and His Tirukkural	(Bharatya Gnanpith)		Selections	
175	1988	K. R. Srinivasa Iyengar	Tirukkural	Calcutta (M. P. Birla Foundation)	Verse	Complete	
176	1988	M. Thiraviyam	Tirukkural	Madras (Asian Educational Services)		Selections	Published again in 1992 as 108 Tirukkural Couplets in English by Vanathi Padippakam, Madras
177	1989	K. Chellappan	Kural—Portraits: Dr. Kalaignar M. Karunanidhi's Kuralovium, a Translation from Tamil by K. Chellappan	Annamalai Nagar: Annamalai University			
178	1990	Chidambaran Ilankumaranar	Thirukkural English Translation	Madurai			
179	1990	A. Pandurangan	Tirukkural—Arattuppal	Thiruvannamalai (Tilakavathi Publications)			
180	1991	M. Swaminathan					
181	1992	Norman Cutler	A Gift of Tamil: Translations of Tamil Literature (Edited by Paula Richman)	New Delhi (Manohar and American Institute of Indian Studies)			
182	1995	T. R. Kallapiran					
183	1995	D. V. G. Ramarathinam	Tirukkural	(Thiyaga Durgam)	Prose	Complete	
184	1997	G. J. B. Christopher	A Metrical Translation of Tirukkural (Part One: Righteousness)	Tiruchirappalli (Primerose Home)		Partial	Translated only Book I; 80 pages
185	1997	Swamiji Iraianban	Ambrosia of Thirukkural	New Delhi (Abhinav Publication)	Prose	Complete	
186	1997	G. N. Das	Readings from Thirukkural	New Delhi (Abhinav Publication)	Verse and Prose	Select	Translated 290 couplets in both verse and prose.
187	1998	J. Narayanasamy	Tirukkural	Coimbatore	Mixed	Complete	Translated more in prose than in verse. Reprinted in 1999
188	1999	K. Kalia Perumal	Wonders of Tirukkural	Thanjavur (Jayam Publications)	Verse	Complete	
189	1999	C. B. Acharya	Maxims of Truth (Commentary on Thirukkural)	Madras (Super Power Press)			964 pages
190	1999	K. C. Agamudai Nambi	Thirukkural	Madurai (Author)			352 pages
191	2001	C. R. Sundar	Book Divine Tirukkural	Chennai (Vignesh Pathippakam)	Verse	Complete	
192	2001	V. K. Subramanian	Pearls of Wisdom: Tirukkural (Tamil: Tirukkural Cintanai Muttukkal)	Chennai (M.T.S. Academy India)			82 p.
193	2002	A. Kandiah, V. Jayadevan, and L. A. Buckingham	Gleanings from Tirukkural for a Multicultural Society	Strathfield South, New South Wales, Australia (Natanalaya Publication)		Selections	47 pages. Bilingual edition; ISBN 978-0-9750653-3-4
194	2003	V. Padmanabhan	Thirukkural with English Explanation	Chennai (Manimekalai Prasuram)	Prose	Complete	
195	2003	K. Kannan	Thirukkural Expressed in English	Madurai (Papa Publications)	Prose	Complete	
196	2003	S. Manickavasagam	Thirukkural: Tamil text, its paraphrase, Roman rendering and English translation	New Delhi (Richa Prakashan)	Prose		
197	2003	V. Perampalam	The Sacred Kural of Thiruvalluvar; A path to purposeful living	Chennai			
198	2004	O. R. Krishnaswami	The Wisdom of Tirukkural—A Guide to Living	Mumbai (Bharatiya Vidya Bhavan)	Prose	Partial	Translated only Books I and II
199	2004	Anantham Krishnamurthy and R. Shahjahan	Thirukkural (Original text, Romanization with English and French translations)	New Delhi (Richa Prakashan)			676 pages; ISBN 978-81-87062-73-8
200	2004	P. Varadarajan	Thirukkural: The Voice From Within	New Delhi (National Council of Educational Research and Training)		Complete	136 pages
201	2005	M. D. Jayabalan		Cheyyar (Mavanna Publications)	Verse	Partial	Translated only 321 couplets
202	2005	G. Govindarajulu	Quintessence of Thirukkural	Chennai (ANK Prints)			
203	2005	K. Krishnaswamy and Vijaya Ramkumar	Unpublished online translation			Complete	
204	2005	Morgan Yegambaram	Thirukkural for Children	Durban, South Africa			
205	2005	S. M. Ponnaiah	A Tapestry of Tamil Poetry	Kuala Lumpur (University of Malaya Press)		Selections	Translated only 133 couplets
206	2005	Deivanayaki Thirumalai	Book of Virtue in Rhythmic Verses	Chennai (Perfect Xerox)		Partial	Translated only Book I; translated 100 more couplets in 2014
207	2006	David Pratap Singh	Tirukkural	Madurai (Master Pathippakam)	Verse	Complete	396 pages
208	2006	S. Ratnakumar	Tirukkural: A Guide to Effective Living	Singapore (Tamils Representative Council [TRC])	Prose	Complete	
209	2006	N. V. K. Ashraf	Tirukkural: Getting Close to the Original	(Online)	Prose	Selections	English translations of various authors; translated about 200 couplets
210	2006	M. Annamalai	Thirukkural: Tamil–English	Chennai (Santha Publications)			76 pages
211	2007	Kalladan	Tirukkural Readings and Reflections	Chennai (Manivasagam Publications)			273 pages
212	2007	V. Srinivasan	Thirukkural	(Sri Vijeyam Publishers)			
213	2008	M. D. Jayabalan	Thirukkural in English	Cheyyar		Selections	Translated a selections of 317 couplets from all the three books
214	2008	C. R. Soundarrajan	Thirukkural Uraikkalanjiam	(Thiruvarasu Puthaka Nilayam)			960 pages
215	2008	Chellaiah Yogarathinam	Thirukkural in English	Chennai (Manimekalai Prasuram)			
216	2008	Ira. Ilangkannanaar	Bilingual Tirukkural	(KPK Memorial Political Souvenir)		Partial	Translated only 1049 couplets
217	2009	V. Murugan	Thirukkural in English	Chennai (Arivu Pathippagam)	Verse	Complete	
218	2009	Moorthy Rajaram	Thirukkural: Pearls of Inspiration	New Delhi (Rupa Publications)	Verse	Complete	
219	2009	Moorthy Rajaram	Thirukkural: Pearls of Inspiration	New Delhi (Rupa Publications)	Prose	Complete	
220	2009	N. E. Ramalingam	Thirukkural Commentary in Tamil and English	Chennai (Thiruvalluvar Pathippagam)	Prose	Complete	
221	2009	Damo Bullen	Unpublished				
222	2009	Pasupathy Dhanaraj	Tirukkural: Tenets for Right Living	Chennai (Mathushree Imprints)			284 pages
223	2009	B. Ramiah	Tirukkural: English Explanation	Pudukkottai (Pudukkottai Thirukkural Kazhagam)		Selections	Translated only 330 couplets
224	2010	B. R. M. Subramani	Thirukkural: Righteousness: Morals and Virtues	(Dravidian University)		Partial	Translated only Books I and II; published in two volumes
225	2011	R. Viswanathan	Thirukkural: Universal Tamil Scripture: Alongwith [sic] the Commentary of Parimalazhagar in English	Mumbai (Bharatiya Vidya Bhavan)	Prose	Complete	ISBN 978-81-7276-448-7
226	2012	A. Gopalakrishnan	Tirukkural—Thiruvalluvar Karutthurai	Chidambaram (Meiyappan Padhippagam)	Prose	Complete	Authored both Tamil commentary and English translation
227	2012	S. John Sahayam	Tirukkural—English translation	Chennai (Vanathi Padhippagam)			
228	2012	Vaidehi Herbert	Thirukkural in English	(Online)		Complete	
229	2013	T. Kannan		(Online)	Prose	Partial	Translated Book I and II; Book III in progress as of 2024
230	2013	Singaravelu Sachithanantham	Karya Etika Tamil Berjudul Thirukkuṛaḷ	Malaysia (Uma Publications)	Verse	Complete	Trilingual version with Tamil original and Malay and English versions translated by the translator.
231	2013	Anonymous	Kural Abridged—Damowords	(Online)		Complete	Single-line translation
232	2014	S. P. Guruparan	Thirukkural: English Translation	Chennai (Mayilavan Padhippagam)	Verse	Complete	
233	2015	Gopalkrishna Gandhi	Tiruvalluvar—The Tirukkural: A New English Version	New Delhi (Aleph Book Company)	Verse	Complete	
234	2015	Jyothirllata Girija	Voice of Valluvar—Thirukkural (The Tamil Veda)	Allahabad (Cyberwit.net)	Verse and Prose	Complete	
235	2015	R. Venkatachalam	Thirukkural—Translation—Explanation: A Life Skills Coaching Approach	Gurgaon (Partridge Publishing India)	Verse	Complete	Published in 689 pages, with new interpretations given for about 360 couplets.
236	2016	S. Kasipandiyan	Thiruvalluvar on Human Destiny	(Allied Publishers Limited)		Complete	
237	2016	Narayanalakshmi	Thirukkural of Thiruvalluvar		Prose	Complete	5 volumes
238	2017	Ajayan Thenmala	Tiruvalluvar Tirukkural (Trilingual)	(Bhairavi Publications)			282 pages (with Hindi, English and Malayalam translations)
239		V. K. Parameswaran Pillai	Kural	Madras			
240	2018	Madurai Babaraj	Thirukkural: Virtue	Chennai (B. Vasantha)	Prose	Complete	
241	2018	R. J. A. Stephen Loie	Thirukkural English Couplet	Chennai (Palaniappa Brothers)			208 pages; ISBN 978-93-88139-60-1
242	2019	R. Jayaprakasam	Thirukkural: Text in English & Tamil	Chennai (Porselvi Pathippagam)	Prose	Complete	
243	2019	Pattu M. Bhoopathi	Thus Blossoms Love: A Transcreation of Kamattupal in Modern Verse	Chennai (Sandhya Publications)	Verse	Partial	Translated Book III alone in modern verse form
244	2020	Jeevendiran Chemen	Tirukkural (Volume 1 & 2: Domestic life and Ascetic life)	Ebene, Mauritius (self-published)		Partial	Translated Book I alone in English and French
245	2020	Lakshman Naresh	Tirukkural in English (Thiruvalluvar Book 1)	Kindle edition			178 pages
246	2020	Varadaraja V. Raman	Tirukkural (Book I) in English: As Rhyming Couplets with the Core Ideas	Kindle edition			161 pages (SIN: B086VVN-5HQ)
247	2021	J. S. Anantha Krishnan	Thiruvalluvar's Thirukkural	Kollam (Dream Bookbindery)	Verse	Complete	Youngest translator to have completed the translation of entire book in under 25 years
248	2021	N. Doraiswamy	Tirukkural in Easy English (Vol. 1) (Vol. 2 On Love)	Chennai (Notion Press)			154 pages; published again in 2022 (300 pages)
249	2021	Kavikkuyil Anaivaariyar	Thirukkural: Pearls of Wisdom from Classical Tamil Series	Chennai (Notion Press)	Couplet	Complete	322 pages
250	2021	P. Subramanian	Thirukkural—A Comprehensive Vision for Life	(Jazym Books)			552 pages
251	2022	Thomas Hitoshi Pruiksma	The Kural: Tiruvalluvar's Tirukkural	Boston (Beacon Press)	Verse	Complete	
252	2022	R. Manimohan	Unpublished	Coimbatore		Partial	Books I and II
253	2022	Karen Goel	Thirukkural	Chennai (Notion Press)			226 pages, paperback; ISBN 979-8-88555-640-8
254	2022	T. Anatharani and K. Bhagat Singh	The Chapter on Wealth	(Yes Dee Publishing)		Partial	162 pages; ISBN 978-93-91549-23-7
255	2023	S. B. Chakraborthy	Thirukkural	Chennai (Discovery Publications)			
256	2023	Meena Kandasamy	The Book of Desire	New Delhi (Penguin Random House India)	Prose	Partial	Translated Book III alone from a feministic view point
257	2023	R. Natarajan	The Kural: English Translation of the Ancient Tamil Text Thirukkural	Chennai (Rare Publications)		Complete	
258	2023	K. Dhevendhiran	Tirukkural: English version	Kindle edition			221 pages
259	2023	A. Rajamanickam	The Holy Kural: A Comprehensive Prose Rendering Work	(Thamarai Publications)			ISBN 978-81-234-4523-6
260	2023	Theanmozhi Chembian	Thirukkural English Translation in Seven Words	(PeriyarBooks.com)			283 pages
261	2024	K. M. A. Ahamed Zubair	Thirukkural: Universal Book	London (Shams Publishing Inc.).		Complete	

== History of English translations ==
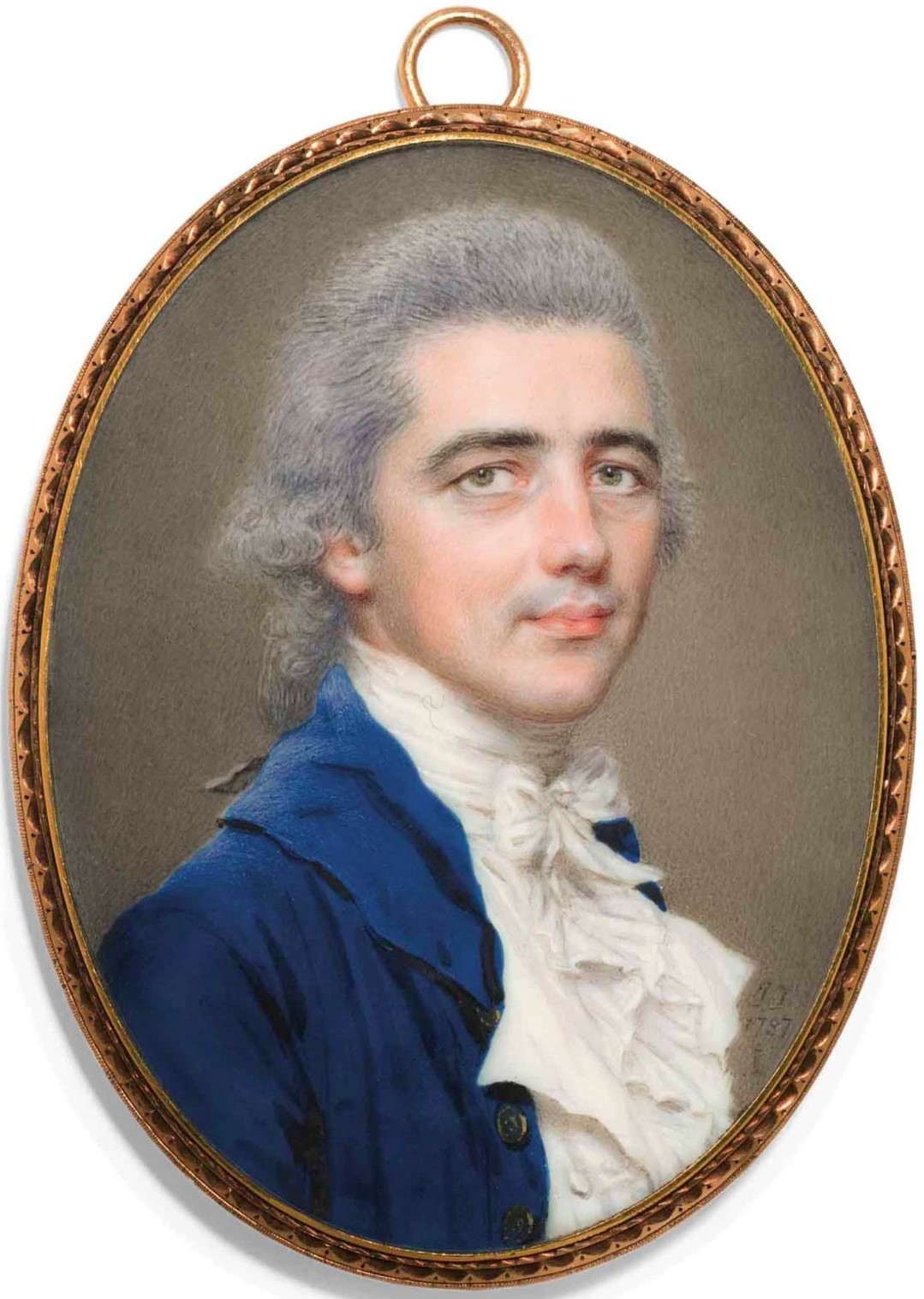
N. E. Kindersley, the first ever English translator of the Kural

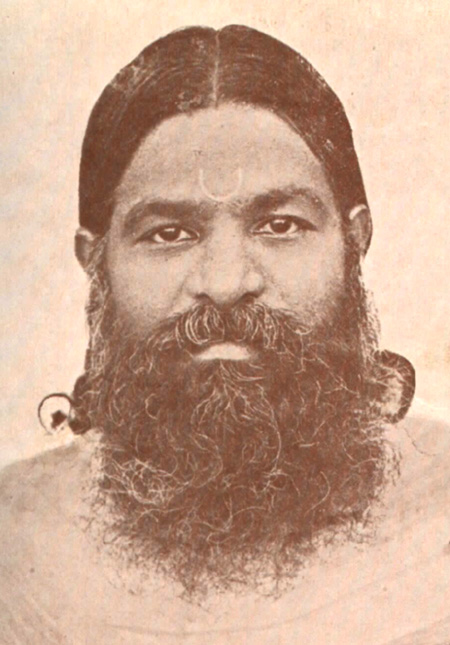
V. V. S. Aiyar, the first native scholar who made a complete translation of the Kural into English

Following the translation of the Kural text into Latin by Constantius Joseph Beschi in 1730, Nathaniel Edward Kindersley attempted the first ever English translation of the Kural text in 1794, translating select couplets in verse. Francis Whyte Ellis attempted the second English translation, who translated only 120 of the 1330 couplets of the Kural text—69 in verse and 51 in prose. In 1840, William Henry Drew translated the first book of the Tirukkural in prose. In 1852, he partially completed the second book, too, in prose. Along with his own English prose translation, his publication contained the original Tamil text, the Tamil commentary by Parimelazhagar and Ramanuja Kavirayar's amplification of the commentary. He thus covered chapters 1 through 63, translating 630 couplets. John Lazarus, a native missionary, revised Drew's work and completed the remaining portion, beginning from Chapter 64 through Chapter 133. Thus, Drew and Lazarus together made the first complete prose translation of the Tirukkural available in English. Meanwhile, there were two more verse translations made in 1872 and 1873 by Charles E. Gover and Edward Jewitt Robinson, respectively. While Gover translated only select couplets, Robinson translated the first two books of the Kural text. The first complete verse translation in English and the first complete English translation by a single author was achieved in 1886 by George Uglow Pope, whose work brought the Tirukkural to a wider audience of the western world.

The first English translation by a native scholar (i.e., scholar who is a native speaker of Tamil) was made in 1915 by T. Tirunavukkarasu, who translated 366 couplets into English. The first complete English translation by a native scholar was made the following year by V. V. S. Aiyar, who translated the entire work in prose. Aiyar's work is considered by various scholars, including Czech scholar Kamil Zvelebil, to be the most scholarly of all the English translations made until then, including those by native English scholars.

At least 24 complete translations were available in the English language by the end of the twentieth century, by both native and non-native scholars. By 2014, there were about 57 versions available in English, of which at least 30 were complete.

=== Comparison of translations ===
The following table illustrates two different facets of a subject depicted by two Kural couplets from the same chapter and their different interpretations by various translators.

Year	Translator	Form	Chapter 26 (The Renunciation of Flesh-Eating)	
Year	Translator	Form	Kural 254 (Couplet 26:4)	Kural 258 (Couplet 26:8)
	Original text	Verse	அருளல்லது யாதெனில் கொல்லாமை கோறல் பொருளல்லது அவ்வூன் தினல்.	செயிரின் தலைப்பிரிந்த காட்சியார் உண்ணார் உயிரின் தலைப்பிரிந்த ஊன்.
1840–1885	William Henry Drew & John Lazarus	Prose	Is it asked what is kindness and its opposite? It is the preservation of life, and its destruction (therefore) it is not right to eat that flesh (from which life has been taken away).	The wise, who have freed themselves from mental delusion, will not eat the flesh which has been severed from an animal.
1873–1885	Edward Jewitt Robinson	Verse	If merciless, it is to kill To eat what’s slaughter’d must be ill.	Whose minds from fleshly lusts are freed Refuse on lifeless flesh to feed.
1886	George Uglow Pope	Verse	What’s a grace, or lack of grace? ‘To kill’ is this, that ‘not to kill’; To eat dead flesh can never worthy end fulfil.	Whose souls the vision pure and passionless perceive, Eat not the bodies men of life bereave.
1916	V. V. S. Aiyar	Prose	The killing of animals is veritable hardness of heart; but the eating of their flesh is inequity indeed.	Behold the men who have escaped from the bonds of illusion and ignorance: they eat not the flesh from which life hath flown out.
1931	H. A. Popley	Verse	What is kindliness and its opposite? The one is non-killing, the other is killing; To eat dead flesh is not good.	Not translated
1942	M. S. Purnalingam Pillai	Prose	Not to kill is grace. To kill is what is called lack of grace. To eat the meat of the killed animal is unworthy.	Those who are free from blame and have the clear vision will not eat the meat of animals which have lost their life or which are slaughtered.
1946	S. M. Michael	Verse	To kill not’s Grace, to kill its loss; To eat lives no good alas!	Seers true, men clean never eat a corse, No sin they do dread worse.
1949	V. R. Ramachandra Dikshitar	Prose	What is compassion but refraining from killing; what is sin but eating flesh?	Men of clear vision abstain from the flesh of a slaughtered animal.
1953	A. Chakravarti	Prose	What’s grace, or lack of grace? ‘To kill’ is this, that ‘not to kill’; To eat dead flesh can never worthy end fulfil.	A person free from the erroneous beliefs and equipped with the right faith will not eat flesh obtained from animal bereft of life.
1962	K. M. Balasubramaniam	Verse	To kill not aught is grace and killing is the lack of grace. To eat the flesh of lives thus killed is naught but great disgrace.	The men of pure vision quite free from illusion's dark mesh Won't eat at all the carcass that is free from life, called flesh.
1968	Shuddhananda Bharati	Verse	If merciless it is to kill, To kill and eat is disgraceful.	Whose mind from illusion is freed Refuse on lifeless flesh to feed.
1969	G. Vanmikanathan	Prose	If you ask what charity is and what is not, they are non-killing and killing respectively; eating that (slaughtered) meat is unrighteousness (sin).	Men of wisdom freed from the error (of delusion) will not eat flesh carved out of a creature.
1969	Kasturi Srinivasan	Verse	Not to kill is grace; to kill’s otherwise, But to eat dead flesh is never wise.	The visionaries, who follow a faultless creed Will not eat bodies, from life freed.
1978	S. N. Sriramadesikan	Prose	Non-injury is otherwise known as compassion; doing injury is heartlessness. The wise know that it is a sin to eat the flesh of animals.	The good ones, free from the three kinds of blemishes (desires) and possessed of unalloyed wisdom will hold dead bodies as corpses and will not eat the flesh.
1979	Satguru Sivaya Subramuniya Swami	Verse	If you ask, "What is kindness and what is unkindness?" It is not-killing and killing. Thus, eating flesh is never virtuous.	(a) Perceptive souls who have abandoned passion Will not feed on flesh abandoned by life. (b) Insightful souls who have abandoned the passion to hurt others Will not feed on flesh that life has abandoned.
1988	K. R. Srinivasa Iyengar	Verse	Grace says “Life, Life”, cruelty cries, “kill, kill!” It’s not grace to feed on flesh.	Those with unclouded minds will desist from Eating killed animal's flesh.
1989	P. S. Sundaram	Verse	Grace is not killing, to kill disgrace; And to eat a thing killed, profitless sin.	The undeluded will not feed on meat Which is but carrion.
1998	J. Narayanasamy	Prose	Mercy demands not to kill; butchering is cruel, and eating flesh meat is insensuous.	Wisdom free from the painful mind of evil will abstain from feeding on flesh.
2000	S. M. Diaz	Verse	To make others break the law of not killing is inconsistent with compassion; There is, therefore, no sense in eating the meat obtained by such killing.	Those who have a vision that is not blurred by mental confusion Will not eat the meat of dead carcasses.
2003	V. Padmanabhan	Prose	Compassion warrants that one should not kill anybody and that too killing other creatures for food is more sinful.	Persons who are determined not to overlook moral disciplines will not take meat obtained by killing other species.
2009	V. Murugan	Verse	Benevolence is not to kill, and killing is lack of it And to eat the flesh thus obtained is an act unrighteous.	Men of vision freed of blemishes within Take not to eating the flesh of a lifeless body.
2009	Moorthy Rajaram	Verse	Non-killing is indeed an act of kindness Killing and eating it is unkindness.	The undeluded wise will ever avoid meat Which is but the flesh of a lifeless beast.
2009	Moorthy Rajaram	Prose	Not killing a creature is an act of kindness. Killing and eating its meat is unkindness.	Wise men who have clear mind will refrain from eating the flesh of a lifeless animal.
2012	A. Gopalakrishnan	Prose	When questioned about 'Kindness' and 'Non-kindness' the reply will be 'Non-killing' and 'Killing' respectively. One, without killing an animal by himself, eating the flesh of an animal killed by others, is also not meant by kindness.	Those, who have spotless and clear knowledge, will not eat the flesh of an animal from which life is taken out.
2014	S. P. Guruparan	Verse	(a) If it is asked what compassion is, it is not killing any living beings; And what is not compassion is killing and eating the flesh of the living beings!! (b) Not killing any living being is compassion And it is a sin to kill and eat the living beings!!	If one is freed from delusion and has the wisdom spotless He won't eat a body lifeless!!
2015	Gopalkrishna Gandhi	Verse	Don't hide behind the butcher's blade saying, 'He kills, I only eat' You're the one that whets the knife that makes the thing called meat.	If you wish, as you should, that your soul be liberated Think: this once lived, breathed, moved, till it was beheaded.
2022	Thomas Hitoshi Pruiksma	Verse	If Lack of compassion — killing not-killing — lack; Of virtue — eating what's killed	They eat no flesh severed from life — those Who have severed confusion

== Comparison with European literature ==
In his introduction to the English translation, G. U. Pope compared the Kural to the works of Propertius and Martial and to the Latin elagiac verse. In his commentary, he quoted analogous passages from various authors such as Horace, Aeschylus, Dante Alighieri, William Shakespeare, Robert Browning, William Wordsworth, and Catullus. He added that what Archbishop Trench said of Saint Augustin is equally true of Valluvar:

He abounds in short and memorable, and if I might so call them, epigrammatic sayings, concentrating with a forceful brevity, the whole truth, which he desires to impart, into some single phrase, forging it into a polished shaft at once pointed to pierce, and barbed that it shall not lightly drop from the mind and memory.

Pope went on to composing a poem on the universality of Valluvar, hailing him as the "Bard of Universal Man".

== Criticisms on translations ==
The couplets of the Kural are inherently complex by virtue of their dense meaning within their terse structure. Thus, no translation can perfectly reflect the true nature of any given couplet of the Kural unless read and understood in its original Tamil form. Added to this inherent difficulty is the attempt by some scholars to either read their own ideas into the Kural couplets or deliberately misinterpret the message to make it conform to their preconceived notions. The translations by the Christian missionaries are often criticized for misinterpreting the text in order to conform it to Christian principles and beliefs. In August 2022, the governor of Tamil Nadu, R. N. Ravi, criticized G. U. Pope for "translating with the colonial objective to 'trivialise' the spiritual wisdom of India," resulting in a "de-spiritualised version" of the Kural text. According to V. Ramasamy, even the very first Latin translation of the text by Beschi is distorted. He writes, "Beschi is purposely distorting the message of the original when he renders பிறவாழி as 'the sea of miserable life' and the phrase பிறவிப்பெருங்கடல் as 'sea of this birth' which has been translated by others as 'the sea of many births'. Beschi means thus 'those who swim the vast sea of miseries'. The concept of rebirth or many births for the same soul is contrary to Christian principle and belief".

Scholars also criticize Pope for over-emphasising certain texts from ancient Tamil literature while downplaying, or even dismissing, others, both ancient and more recent. In his book Breaking India, Rajiv Malhotra writes of Pope's attempts to undermine Tamil spirituality. He writes of Pope's claims that all Tamil works are of Christian origin, and that Tamil culture has nothing to do with Indian culture, thereby forging a Dravidian identity that previously never existed.

== Less-known translations ==
The Kural has also been translated numerous times without getting published or reaching the masses. Sri Aurobindo, for instance, has translated fifteen couplets of the Kural, including all the ten couplets from the opening chapter (in a different order from the original) and five from the second chapter, in 1919 as part of his translations of various other ancient works.

== See also ==
- Tirukkural translations
- List of translators into English

== Published translations ==
- Pope, G. U. (1886). The Sacred Kurral of Tiruvalluva Nayanar (with Latin Translation By Fr. Beschi) (Original in Tamil with English and Latin Translations). New Delhi: Asian Educational Services, pp. i–xxviii, 408
- Satguru Sivaya Subramuniyaswami. (1979). Tirukkural: The American English and Modern Tamil Translations of an Ethical Masterpiece. ISBN 978-8-1701-7390-8. Available from http://www.redlotusworld.org/resources/Tirukkural.pdf
- Padmanabhan, V. (2003). Thirukkural with English Explanation. Chennai: Manimekalai Prasuram, 280 pp.
- Murugan, V. (2009). Thirukkural in English. Chennai: Arivu Pathippagam, xiv + 272 pp.
- Guruparan, S. P. (2014). Thirukkural: English Translation. Chennai: Mayilavan Padhippagam, 416 pp.
- Venkatachalam, R. (2015). Thirukkural—Translation—Explanation: A Life Skills Coaching Approach. Gurgaon, India: Partridge Publishing India, 689 pp. ISBN 978-1-4828-4290-6.
