= John Lazarus =

John Lazarus may refer to:

- John Lazarus (missionary) (1845–1925), Christian missionary to India who rendered the Tirukkuṛaḷ into English in 1885
- John Lazarus (playwright) (born 1947), Canadian playwright
