= S. M. Michael =

S. M. Michael was one of the early 20th-century translators of the Tirukkural into English.

== Biography ==
S. M. Michael, a native of Nagarcoil, Tamil Nadu, was a pious devotee of the Kural text. He started translating the ancient literature into English in the pre-Independence Era. He established a publishing house named 'The Grace Hut' in the early forties in Nagarcoil. In 1946, he revised his translation and published it for the first time, under the title The Sacred Aphorisms of Thiruvalluvar. It was the fifth of the series published by the publishing house. These works were funded by several patrons, including the Government of Travancore, Dewan C. P. Ramaswami Iyer, and 40 others, whom he acknowledged in the preliminary pages of his translation.

The Kural is the crowning glory of Tamil culture; to it more than to anything else is due the esteem in which the Tamilian is held throughout this globe; it is the most valuable and cherished possession of our race.
If the Englishman (John Bill) would sooner give up his Empire... than Shakespeare, we Tamilians, may boast similarly that we would rather lose all the other mighty monuments of our civilization like our temples and palaces and even the sources of our existence, the Cauvery and the Thamprabharni, than the Tirukkural.
It is, above all, the one boon in the world that would form the basis of a Universal religion such as many of us want today, and such as he seems to have envisaged so long as 2000 years ago and not only envisaged but also actually provided for; it is obvious that he wrote this book with this end in view. (Preface, pp. III–IV)

In 1968, the work was published again by his son M. S. Raja in Sattur.

== See also ==
- Tirukkural translations
- Tirukkural translations into English
- List of translators into English
