= S. M. Diaz =

- Born: 1919; Manapad, Tuticorin district, Tamil Nadu
- Died: 2000 (aged 80–81)
- Occupation: Inspector-General of Police
- Known for: Translating Tirukkural into English
- Spouse: Agnes Diaz

S. M. Diaz (1919 – 2000) was the Inspector-General of Police of Tamil Nadu. He was also a professor of economics and the first director of the Sardar Vallabhbhai Patel National Police Academy that trains officers who are inducted into the Indian Police Service. He is known for translating the Tirukkural into English.

== Biography ==
S. M. Diaz was born in Manapad, Tamil Nadu, in 1919 in a Paravar family. He graduated in mathematics from St. Joseph's College, Tiruchirappalli, obtaining an M.A. He began his career as a professor of mathematics at the same college. In 1949, Diaz topped the first batch at the National Police Academy, Mt. Abu. Later in 1975, he became the director of the academy and was instrumental in moving it to Hyderabad, where it was renamed Sardar Vallabhai Patel Police Academy. He also set up a police unit in the Mt. Abu campus comprising the service staff made redundant by the Academy's move.

In 1977, Diaz organised the Department of Criminology at the University of Madras, and headed the department until 1983, thereafter continuing his service as visiting professor. During this period, in his 70s, Diaz obtained his PhD in criminology. In 1992, he founded the Probus Club of Madras.

Diaz was an avid reader of the Tirukkuṟaḷ, the ancient Tamil classic on morality. Along with his career-oriented works on prison reforms, social equality, women's empowerment and victimology, his complete English translation of the Kural text, which was published in two volumes, led to his being described as the "Philosopher-Policeman." He first translated Book I (Aram) of the Tirukkural and published it in 1982. In the next 10 years, he translated the second (Porul) and third books (Inbam) of the Kural text. In 2000, he published the entire translation in two volumes, which was published by N. Mahalingam of the Ramanandha Adigalar Foundation in Coimbatore. It was reprinted four times within the next five years.

Diaz was praised by former IGP of Tamil Nadu F.V. Arul for his bandobust scheme for the 1968 Mahamakam Festival in Kumbakonam, who described him as "an officer without crease in his uniform as in his conduct" in the terms of Victor Hugo, who first used the phrase in Les Miserables to characterise Inspector Javert.

Diaz retired as Inspector General of Prisons, Tamil Nadu. In 2000, he died in an accident at the Sardar Vallabhai Patel Police Academy's silver jubilee celebrations on the Hyderabad campus.

== Works ==
- S. M. Diaz. (2000). Thirukkural: English Translation and Explanation (2 vols.). Coimbatore: Ramananda Adigalar Foundation

== See also ==
- Tirukkural translations
- Tirukkural translations into English
- List of translators into English
