= Varahaneri =

- Neighbourhood
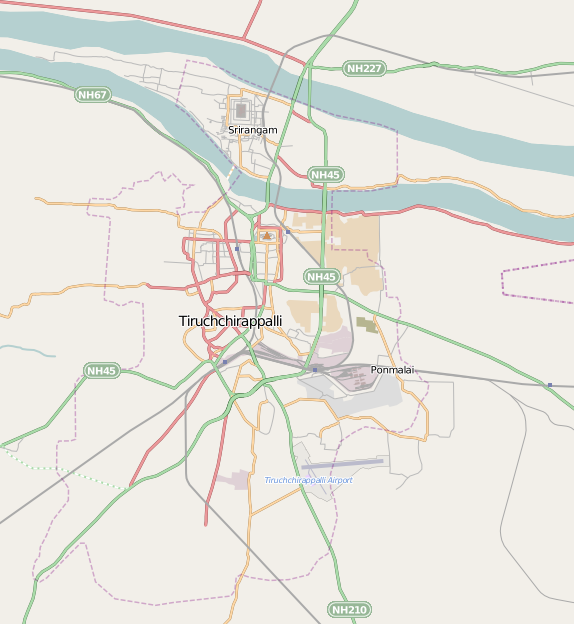
- Location within Tiruchirapalli
- Coordinates: 10°48′44″N 78°42′8″E
- Country: India
- State: Tamil Nadu
- Time zone: UTC+5.30 (IST)

Varahaneri is a neighbourhood in the Indian city of Tiruchirappalli. It is the birthplace of the Indian independence activist V. V. S. Aiyar.
