= V. R. Ramachandra Dikshitar =

Vishnampet Ramachandra Dikshitar
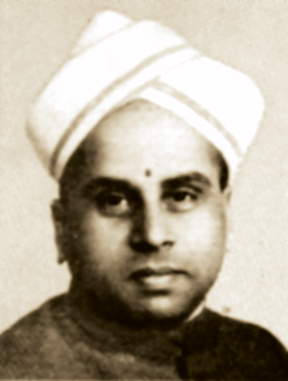
- Born: 16 April 1896; Vishnampet, Madras Presidency, British India
- Died: 24 November 1953 (aged 57); Madras, Madras Presidency, British India
- Occupations: Historian, Academic, Professor, Author

Vishnampet R. Ramachandra Dikshitar (16 April 1896 – 24 November 1953) was a historian, Indologist and Dravidologist from the Indian state of Tamil Nadu. He was professor of history and archaeology at the University of Madras and is the author of standard text books on Indian history.

== Early life ==
Ramachandra Dikshitar was born in the village of Vishnampettai or Vishnampet in Madras Presidency in an orthodox Brahmin family on 16 April 1896. He did his schooling at Sir P S Sivaswami Iyer High School at Thirukkattupalli and earned his bachelor of arts in history with distinction from St. Joseph's College, Tiruchirappalli in 1920. He completed his master's in history in 1923 along with a diploma in economics and obtained his PhD from Madras University in 1927.

== Academic career ==
Ramachandra Dikshitar joined as a lecturer in history at St.Joseph College, Trichy. In 1928, he was appointed as a lecturer in the Department of History and Archaeology, University of Madras. He was promoted to reader in 1946 and made Professor in 1947.

Ramachandra Dikshitar specialized in Indian history in general, and Tamil history, in particular. He was a renowned Sanskrit scholar of his time.

== Works ==
Ramachandra Dikshitar authored a number of books on history. He was the general editor of the Madras University Historical Series. He translated the Silappathikaram in 1939 and the Tirukkural in 1949 into English.

Some of his prominent works are:

- Dikshitar, V. R. Ramachandra (1927). Kautilya and Machiavelli.
- Dikshitar, V. R. Ramachandra; Sakkottai Krishnaswamy Aiyangar (1929). Hindu Administrative Institutions. University of Madras.
- Dikshitar, V. R. Ramachandra (1930). Some Pandya kings of the thirteenth century.
- Dikshitar, V. R. Ramachandra (1932). The Mauryan Polity.
- Dikshitar, V. R. Ramachandra (1935). Indian Culture. Indian Research Institute.
- Dikshitar, V. R. Ramachandra (1936). Studies in Tamil language and history. University of Madras.
- Dikshitar, V. R. Ramachandra (1939). The Śilappadikāram. Oxford University Press.
- Dikshitar, V. R. Ramachandra (1942). The Lalitā Cult. University of Madras.
- Dikshitar, V. R. Ramachandra (1944). War in Ancient India. Macmillan and Co. Ltd.
- Dikshitar, V. R. Ramachandra (1947). Origin and Spread of the Tamils. Adyar Library.
- Thiruvalluvar; V. R. Ramachandra Dikshitar (1949). Tirukkural: With English Translation. Adyar Library.
- Dikshitar, V. R. Ramachandra (1951). Pre-historic South India. University of South India.
- Dikshitar, V. R. Ramachandra (1951). The Purana index.
- Dikshitar, V. R. Ramachandra (1952). The Gupta Polity.

== Death ==
Ramachandra Dikshitar died on 24 November 1953.

== Legacy ==
R. Nagaswamy, former director of archaeology, Government of India, once said of Ramachandra Dikshitar:

Prof. V R Ramachandra Dikshitar, was a shining luminary in the horizon of South Indian History and Culture. Deeply rooted in Vedic and Sanskrit tradition—his ancestors were eminent Vedic Scholars and performers of Vedic Yagas—he took it as his life's mission, to expound the history and culture of the soil to which he belonged—the Tamil region and worked tirelessly in that direction till his death. Very early in his life, he started studying ancient Tamil literature, which he soon mastered…. His intimate understanding of Tamil texts enabled him to translate the immortal Tamil works—Silapathikaram and Tirukurral into English. These two Tamil translations, classics by themselves, reflect truly the inner meaning of the classical texts and remain closest to the original among many that have appeared to this day. His studies in Mauryan and Gupta Polity, and also Wars in Ancient India are pioneering works in the field. He realised the importance of the study of Puranas and brought out three volumes of ‘PURANA INDEX’ under the auspices of the University of Madras. His work, Hindu Administrative System, is indeed a landmark in administrative history.

== Historical methodology ==
Ramachandra Dikshitar introduced a new methodology in the study of ancient Indian history. His book "Warfare in Ancient India" speaks of the usage of vimanas in wars in ancient India and claims that the boomerang was invented in South India. He believed that the references to the vimanas were quite real as evidenced by his writings in "Warfare in Ancient India"

No question can be more interesting in the present circumstances of the world than India's contribution to the science of aeronautics. There are numerous illustrations in our vast Puranic and epic literature to show how well and wonderfully the ancient Indians conquered the air. To glibly characterize everything found in this literature as imaginary and summarily dismiss it as unreal has been the practice of both Western and Eastern scholars until very recently. The very idea indeed was ridiculed and people went so far as to assert that it was physically impossible for man to use flying machines. But today what with balloons, aeroplanes and other flying machines, a great change has come over our ideas on the subject…the flying vimana of Rama or Ravana was set down as but a dream of the mythographer till aeroplanes and zeppelins of the present century saw the light of day. The mohanastra or the "arrow of unconsciousness" of old was until very recently a creature of legend till we heard the other day of bombs discharging Poisonous gases. We owe much to the energetic scientists and researchers who plod persistently and carry their torches deep down into the caves and excavations of old and dig out valid testimonials pointing to the misty antiquity of the wonderful creations of humanity.

In his Origin and Spread of the Tamils, Dikshitar includes Australia and Polynesia among the regions known to the ancient South Indians thereby suggesting that South Indian traders might have at least had a general idea of existence of the Australian continent even before it was discovered by Portuguese and Dutch sea-farers of the 16th and 17th centuries.

== See also ==
- Tirukkural translations
- Tirukkural translations into English
- List of translators into English
