= K. R. Srinivasa Iyengar =

Indian writer and academic (1908–1999)

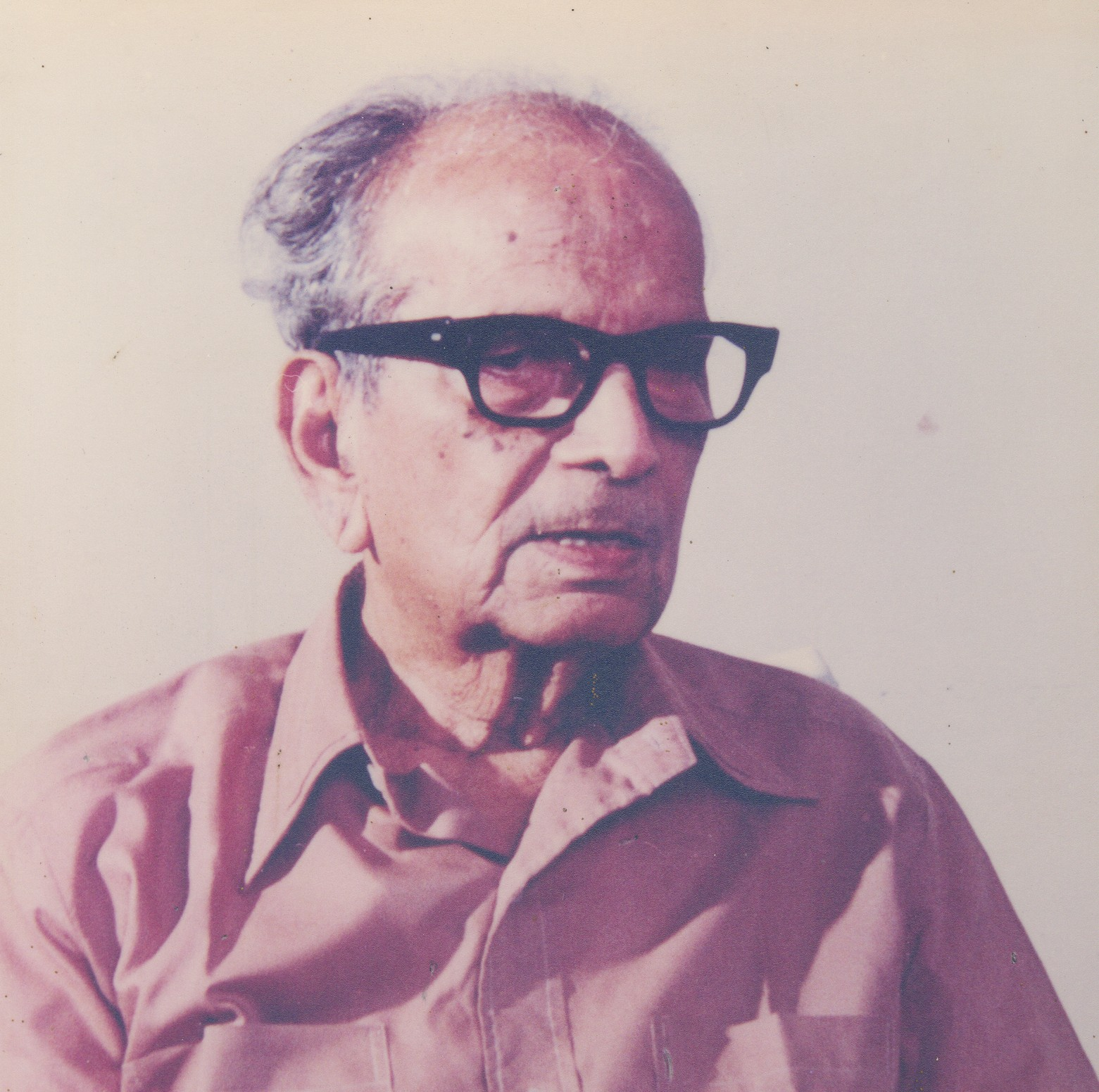
- Born: 17 April 1908; Sattur, Tamil Nadu, India
- Died: 15 April 1999 (aged 90); Chennai, Tamil Nadu, India
- Citizenship: India
- Known for: Indian Writing in English
- Awards: Sahitya Akademi Fellowship
- Scientific career
- Fields: English
- Workplaces: Andhra University

Kodaganallur Ramaswami Srinivasa Iyengar (1908–1999), popularly known as K. R. Srinivasa Iyengar, was an Indian writer in English, former vice-chancellor of Andhra University. He was given the prestigious Sahitya Akademi Fellowship in 1985.

== Career ==
Srinivasa Iyengar was born on 17 April 1908. He joined the Department of English in the Andhra University which was started in 1947. On 30 June 1966, he became the vice-chancellor of the Andhra University and continued till 29 November 1968. The Department of English, one of the oldest in the University, was carved out of the Department of Modernity European Languages. He then served as vice-president of Sahitiya Akadami from 1969 to 1977, and then its acting president from 1977 to 1978. He has served as a member of the Press Council of India, the Board of Governors of the Indian Institute of Advanced Study, Simla from 1970 to 1979 and the CIEFL (Hyderabad) and on the executive of the P. E. N., All India Centre. He was conferred with D. Litt degrees (honoris causa) by Andhra and Sri Venkateswara Universities. His work On the Mother received the Sahitiya Akadami annual award in 1980.

His lectures in Indian Writing in English at the University of Leeds were turned into the book, Indian Writing in English.

Iyengar in October 1972, gave a series of six lectures on Sri Aurobindo's Savitri at the Indian Institute of Advanced Study, Simla covering the following themes: the Yogi and the Poet; the Savitri Legend; Aswapati the Forerunner; Savitri and Satyavan; Savitri's Yoga; Dawn to greater Dawn.

Iyengar wrote extensively on British, American and Commonwealth literatures, comparative aesthetics, and the spiritual heritage of India. He has authored more than 40 books.

== Literary works ==
- Lytton Strachey (1938)
- Indo-Anglian Literature (1943)
- Literature and authorship in India (1943)
- The Indian contribution to English literature (1945)
- Sri Aurobindo - Biography (1945)
- Gerard Manley Hopkins, the man and the poet (1948)
- On the Mother (1952)
- Shakespeare (1964)
- Education and the new India (1967)
- Indian Writers in Council
- Leaves from a Log: Fragments of a Journey.
- Rabindranath Tagore (1965)
- Mainly academic talks to students and teachers (1968)
- Guru Nanak - A Homage (1973)
- Indian Writing in English (1983)
- Australia helix (1983)
- Sitayana (1987)
- English translation of the Tirukkural (1988)
- Saga of seven mothers (1991)
- Krishna-geetam (1994)

== See also ==
- Tirukkural translations into English
- List of translators into English
