= Emmons E. White =

- Born: 1891
- Died: 1982
- Occupation: Missionary
- Known for: Translating Tirukkural into English
- Spouse: Ruth Parker White (1895–1989)
- Children: Robin White (born 1928)

Emmons E. White (1891–1982) was a Christian missionary in South India. He is best known for his work on Tamil music and his English translation of the Tirukkural.

== Biography ==
Emmons E. White was married to Ruth Parker White (1895–1989), both of whom served as missionaries in southeastern India from 1917 to 1957. Their interests included the education and care of children, famine relief, a hospital for lepers, Christian churches in the region, and Tamil music. They had a daughter, Laura Ruth (born 1922), a son, William Robinson (born 1928) and another son, Stephen, born 1933. The also adopted a daughter, Sakundula, who was orphaned during World War II.

In 1968, White translated select couplets of the Tirukkural into English in verse form and published it in his work The Wisdom of India. Later in 1976, these were published as another work of his titled The Wisdom of the Tamil People. White considered Tirukkural as "a synthesis of the best moral teachings of the world."

== Publications ==
Following are the works published by Emmons E. White:

- Kālakṣēpamum cuvicēsṣap piraccāramum (Tamil) (with V. Jeyaraj and Ṭ. Srinivas Iyengar) (1955)
- Appreciating India's music: An introduction to the music of India, with suggestions for its use in the churches of India (1957)
- The wisdom of India (1968)
- Appreciating India's music: An introduction, with an emphasis on the music of South India (1971)
- The wisdom of the Tamil people, as illustrated by translated selections from their ancient literature (1975)

== See also ==
- Tirukkural translations
- Tirukkural translations into English
- List of translators into English
