= Chittaranjan Das (writer) =

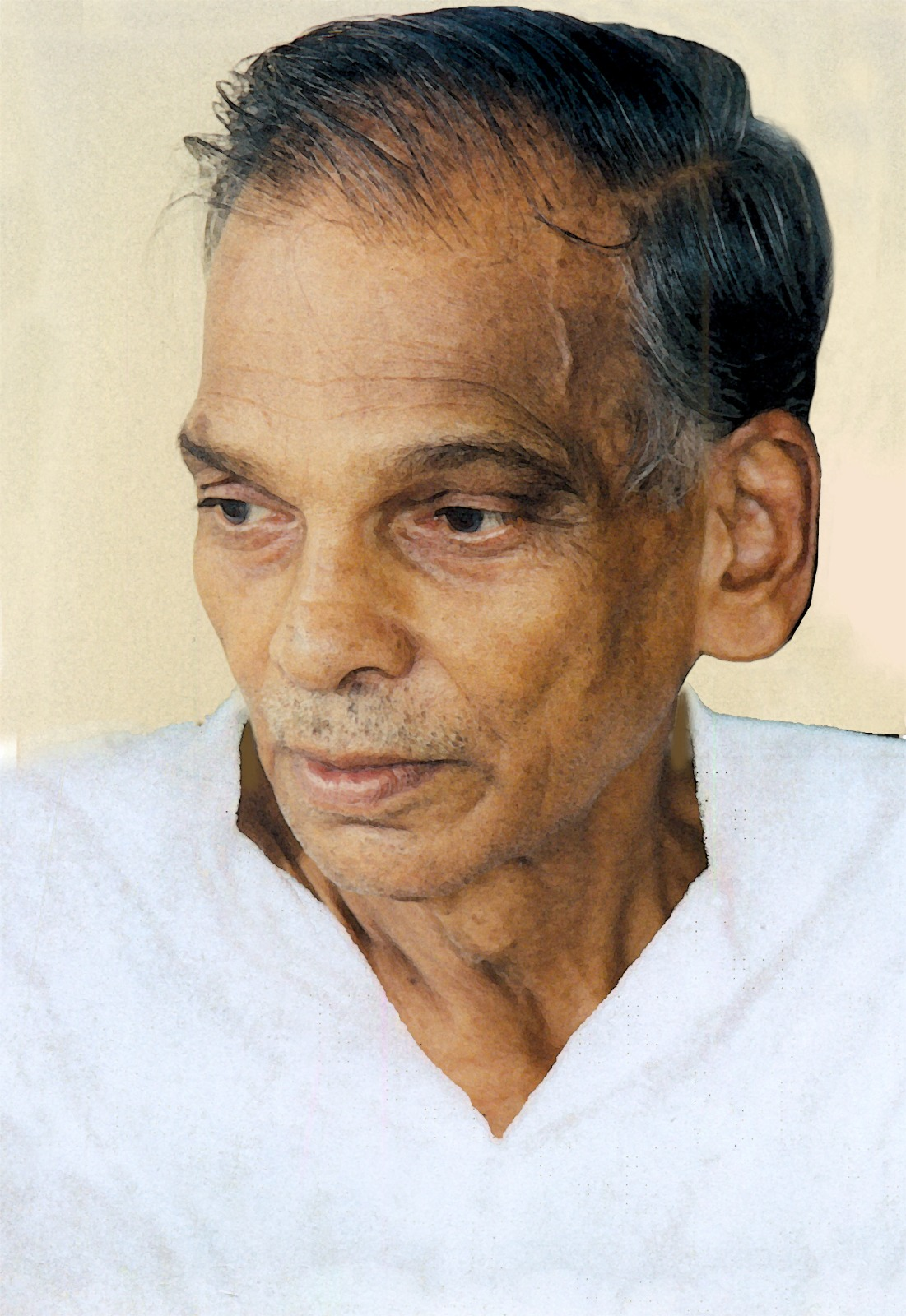
- Chittaranjan Das
- Born: October 3, 1923; Bhagalpur, Jagatsinghpur district, Orissa, India
- Died: January 16, 2011 (aged 87); Bhubaneswar, Orissa
- Education: Visva-Bharati University, Shantiniketan; University of Copenhagen, Denmark
- Occupations: Educator; translator; author; social reformer
- Works: Gabaksha to the world, Orissa and Odia school of life
- Spouse: Usha Das
- Children: 1 (son)
- Awards: 1998 Orissa Sahitya Akademy Award; Central Literary Academy Award; Sharla Award

Chittaranjan Das, popularly known as Chitta Bhai or Chitbhai (3 October 1923 – 16 January 2011), was an Indian writer, translator, critic, and social reformer from Orissa. A multilingual, he focused his works in Odia language, covering a wide range of topics including education, literature, cultural creativity, social criticism, social work, sociology, and religion.

Considered one of the most prolific writers in Odia, with numerous diaries, essays, reviews, autobiographies, memoirs, columns, textbooks, and monographs, Das made many innovations in the fields of translation, essays, criticism and travelogue writing. His columns were published regularly in various newspapers. Knowing as many as 18 languages, Das has taught in Germany, Finland and Israel before returning to India. He was the first to translate the Kural into Odia. Known as "Socrates of Odisha", Das died in Bhubaneswar on 16 January 2011.

== Early life and education ==
Das was born in 1923 in Bhagalpur village in Jagatsinghpur district, Orissa as the third child of five boys and three girls. After schooling in his native village, he attended Punang School, then Ranihat Minor School, and then the Ravenshaw Collegiate School. After passing the matriculation examination in 1941, he enrolled at Ravenshaw College in Cuttack, where he became an active member of the Communist Party of India. Inspired by Manmohan Mishra, he became involved in the independence movement. In 1942, he joined the Quit India Movement and was imprisoned. During his jail term, he started learning languages, particularly French.

In 1945, Das was released from prison and pursued his higher studies at Rabindranath Tagore's Shantiniketan and at Copenhagen University in Denmark. He studied psychology, sociology, and cultural anthropology. He was trained in clinical psychology at the Vienna School established by Sigmund Freud, where he met philosopher Martin Buber. In mid-1950s, he started an experimental school named Jeevana Vidyalaya (School of Life).

Das was married to Usha Das, a gynecologist, with whom he had one son.

== Literary career ==
Das returned to India in 1954 and joined the Jibana Vidyalaya, a school for basic Gandhian education and Gandhian ideals of living independently, at Champattimunda in Odisha established by Nabakrushna Choudhury and Malati Devi. He later became the head master of the institution. He resigned from the school after four years to pursue a teaching assignment near Agra. Upon his return to Odisha, Das was attracted by the teachings of Sri Aurobindo and in 1973 started teaching at the Institute of Integral Education in Bhubaneswar. He remained associated with this movement until his death.

Das was proficient in several languages, including Hindi, Urdu, Bengali, Assamese, Sanskrit, Danish, Finnish, French, Spanish, and English. His studies focused on many areas of social and human sciences such as philosophy, psychology, religious studies, linguistics, and school studies. He wrote or translated into Odia as many as 250 books.

Das began his writing career with an article titled "Socrates" in the Ravenshaw Collegiate magazine Sikshabandhu in 1937 and went on to regularly contributing to newspapers, including major Odia dailies such as Dharitri, Pragativadi, Sambad, and Samaja. An avid traveller, he wrote books on his observations on the social, cultural, and political lives of the countries he visited and translated several works from those countries. His personal diaries contained several incidents and his autobiographical diary entries were published as Rohitara Daeri (Rohit's Diary), a series of more than 20 volumes. Although he had a good command of more than a dozen languages, including German, Danish, and Finnish, Sanskrit, Pali, Urdu, and Bengali, he wrote chiefly in Odia.

Das's significant work included translating Sri Aurobindo's Life Divine and Valluvar's Tirukkural into Odia.

=== List of Works ===
- The School of Life
- Jungle Letter
- Stone and Shalagram
- Waves and Currents
- I Am Young in Race
- Society: Change and Development
- Culture and Odisha
- Orissa and Odia
- Monographs and Other Essays
- Shalatirth
- Ma Nishad
- Nail Mirror
- The Backbone Is Ten Directions
- Rohit's Diary
- Leader and Narayan
- Watch the World
- Gandhi Gopbandhu
- Mitrasya Chakhusa (Through the Eyes of a Friend) (autobiography in Odia)

Translations

- Life Divine, 3 Volumes (Translation of Sri Aurobindo's Life Divine)
- Danish Letters (translation of The Pilgrim Kamanita, a Danish book on Denmark)
- Orthodox translation of Saint-Exupéry's English book The Little Prince.
- Translation of Khalil Gibran's English book The Prophet into Odia
- English translation of Pasternak's book Doctor Zhivago.
- Kural, Odia translation of the Kural (published by Bharatiya Vidya Bhavan, Bhubaneswar) (1978).

Along with these, Das translated the writings of many prominent writers including Ashapurna Devi, Albert Schweitzer, Francois Mauriac, Verrier Elwin, Karl Adolph Gjellerup, Antoine de Saint-Exupéry, Mahatma Gandhi, Kahlil Gibran, Sarvapalli Radhakrishnan, Boris Pasternak, and Martin Luther King into Odia.

== Awards and honors ==
- Central Literary Academy Award, 1998 (for Bishwuku Gabaksha)
- Odisha Sahitya Academy Award, 1962 (for Jeevana Bidyalaya)
- Sarala Award, 1989 (for Odisha O' Odia)
- Bishub Award, 1998 (awarded by Prajatantra Prachar Samiti)
- Sahitya Bharti Honour, 2000 (awarded by Sri Gangadhar Rath Foundation)
- Utkal Gem Award, 2002 (awarded by the Utkal Sahitya Samaj)
- Gokarnika Award

== Death ==
On 20 December 2010, Das was hospitalized for nearly a month with a fractured thigh after a fall at his Bapuji Nagar residence in Bhubaneswar. Das died in the afternoon of 16 January 2011 at the age of 88 at a private hospital in Bhubaneswar due to protracted illness due to old age.

== See also ==
- Odia literature
- List of translators
- Tirukkural translations into Odia
