= G. Vanmikanathan =

Tamil scholar

- Born: G. V. Pillai; 6 January 1901; Tiruchirapalli
- Died: 31 May 1989
- Occupation: Tamil scholar
- Known for: Translating Tirukkural into English, and founding the 'Tirukkural Prachar Sangh'

G. Vanmikanathan (6 January 1901 – 31 May 1989), better known as G. V. Pillai, was a Tamil scholar, author, founder and organiser of the 'Tirukkural Prachar Sangh'. He is known for translating the Tirukkural into English.

== Biography ==
Vanmikanathan was born in Tiruchirapalli and studied history, economics and Latin in S. P. G College (now Bishop Heber), obtaining a B.A. He served for 30 years in the North Western Railway at Karachi and in central government service in Bombay and Delhi. He retired in 1956 as deputy secretary of the Central Secretariat. The government honoured him with the title of 'Rao Sahib' for his civilian service during the 1939–1946 war.

Vanmikanathan had a scholarly knowledge in Hindi and English, with working knowledge of Sanskrit and Bengali. He studied the Tirukkural and the Tiruvachakam, and in 1969 translated the Kural text into English in prose. He founded the 'Tirukkural Prachar Sangh' at Tiruchirapalli.

== See also ==
- Tirukkural translations
- Tirukkural translations into English
- List of translators into English
