= Valliamman cave =

Valliamman Cave Temple is a Hindu temple dedicated to the goddess Valli, consort of Murugan (Kartikeya), situated in the northeast corner of Thiruchendur Murugan Temple. In early days, the temple was situated very near to the sea shore and now due to the construction of pathways the sea get backed to some extent. It is a cave of the sandal mountain remainings.

== Temple complex ==
The Valliamman cave temple complex consists of a sanctum sanctorum dedicated to Valli, inside a cave of sandal mountains. Inside the cave, paintings and statues depicting the Murugan and Valli legend are present. In front of the cave, a mandapa with 16 pillars is constructed which is 24.5 feet long and 21.5 feet broad. A narrow path through the cave connects the mandapa and the sanctum. The main gateway to the temple is south-facing towards the Tiruchendur Murugan Temple.

== Legend ==
According to legend, the god Murugan came across Valli guarding her father's millet field and fell in love with her. He assumed the guise of an elderly man, and requested her to offer him food and drink, which were promptly granted. He then asked her to marry him. Valli refused, citing that he was too old for her. Murugan solicited the help of his brother, Ganesha, who chased Valli in form of a mad elephant. Desperate, Valli ran into Murugan's arms, and agreed to be his wife if he rescued her. Murugan drove away the charging elephant and revealed his true form to her, and she grew infatuated with him. After resolving the conflict with her kin, Murugan married Valli. According to local belief, Valli is believed to have taken shelter in the cave from the elephant.
