= Tirukkural translations into Hindi =

Hindi perhaps has many translations of the Tirukkural. As of 2000, there were at least 19 translations of the Kural text available in Hindi. Many of these translations are in verse form.

== History ==
The first translation of the Kural text into Hindi was probably made by Khenand Rakat, who published the translated work in 1924. Khan Chand Rahit published a translation in 1926. In 1958, the University of Madras published a translation by Sankar Raju Naidu under the title "Tamil Ved." In 1964, another translation was published by M. G. Venkatakrishnan, whose second edition appeared in 1998. In 1967, another translation was published under the title "Uttar Ved." In 1982, a translation of 700 couplets of the Kural text was published under the title "Satsai." There was yet another Hindi translation in 1989. In 1990, T. E. S. Raghavan rendered a poetic rendition in couplet form in 'Venba' metre as in the source, following four words in the first line and three in the second. In 2000, a translation by Ananda Sandhidut was published under the title Kural Kavitā Valī.

In 2023, as part of its Ancient Tamil Classics in Translations series, the Central Institute of Classical Tamil (CICT) in Chennai released its Hindi translation of the Kural by M. Govindarajan, who made the translation in both verse and prose.

== Translations ==
Translation	Chapter 26, माँस-वर्जन	
Translation	Kural 254 (Couplet 26:4)	Kural 258 (Couplet 26:8)
M. G. Venkatakrishnan, 1964	निर्दयता है जीववध, दया अहिंसा धर्म। करना माँसाहार है, धर्म हीन दुष्कर्म॥	जीव-हनन से छिन्न जो, मृत शरीर है माँस। दोषरहित तत्वज्ञ तो, खायेंगे नहीं माँस॥

== See also ==
- Tirukkural translations
- List of Tirukkural translations by language
