= A. Chakravarti =

Professor of philosophy at the Presidency College

- Born: 17 May 1880
- Died: 12 February 1960
- Occupation: Professor of Philosophy
- Known for: Translating Tirukkural into English

A. Chakravarti (17 May 1880 – 12 February 1960), who served the Indian Educational Service (IES), was a professor of philosophy at the Presidency College in Chennai, India. He is known for translating the Tirukkural into English.

== Biography ==
Chakravarti served the Indian Educational Services for several years. He was the chief professor of philosophy at the Presidency College in Chennai. He retired from IES as the principal of the Government College at Kumbakonam. In appreciation of his services, the British government honoured him with the title "Rao Bhaghadur."

Chakravarti translated the Tirukkural into English in prose and published it in 1953 under the title "Tirukkural" published by the Diocesan Press, Madras. His translation consists of four aspects: the original couplets of the Kural text in Tamil script, transliteration in Roman script, translation of the literature in modern English prose, and his comments on the thematic aspects of the original literature. Scholars consider his translation faithful to the original.

It is necessary to emphasize the fundamental ideal in the original background, namely, the ideal of Ahimsa. This ideal is expounded in all its implications—ethical, social, and economic. The exposition in all these points of view is fundamentally different from the treatment found in the Vedic school. The purpose of this translation is to emphasize this point in view and to bring out the unique character and value of the ancient culture and civilization of the Tamil land... It may be stated here that among all these scholars (Beschi, Graul, Pope and Ellis) it was Colonel Ellis who had a most clear and correct insight into the nature of the cultural background of this unique work. I owe to Colonel Ellis the point [of] view adopted in this translation (Preface, p. III)

== See also ==
- Tirukkural translations
- Tirukkural translations into English
- List of translators into English
