= V. V. S. Aiyar =

Indian revolutionary (1881–1925)

Varahaneri Venkatesa Subramaniam Aiyar
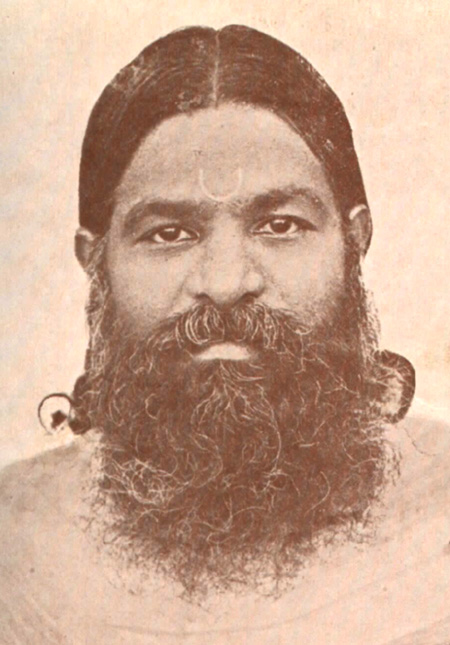
- Portrait of V. V. S. Aiyar
- Born: 2 April 1881; Trichinopoly, Madras Presidency, British India
- Died: 3 June 1925 (aged 44); Papanasam Falls, Madras Presidency, India
- Other name: V. V. S. Aiyar
- Education: Lincoln's Inn, London
- Known for: Indian Independence Movement, India House, literary works

Varahaneri Venkatesa Subramaniam Aiyar (2 April 1881 – 3 June 1925), also known as V. V. S. Aiyar, was an Indian revolutionary from Tamil Nadu who fought against British colonial rule in India. His contemporaries include Subramanya Bharathi and V.O. Chidambaram Pillai, who subscribed to militant forms of resistance against the British colonial government. He also exchanged ideas with V. D. Savarkar during his stay at India House in London. He went into exile in Pondicherry, then under French rule, when his militant activities attracted a warrant for his arrest from the British colonial government.

Aiyar was also a Tamil writer and is considered as the father of modern Tamil short story. He also translated the Ramavatharam of Kambar and Tirukkural into English. V.V.S Aiyar is mentor of Vanchinathan.

== Early life ==
Venkatesa Subramaniam Aiyar was born on 2 April 1881 in the suburb of Varahaneri in Tiruchi. After his early education, he studied in St. Joseph's College and took his B.A in History, Politics, and Latin; he studied for the Law profession and passed the Pleader (junior lawyer) examination from the Madras University in 1902. He then practised as the pleader in the District courts of Tiruchi. Aiyar then moved to Rangoon in 1906 and started practising as a junior in the Chambers of an English Barrister. From Rangoon, he left for London in 1907 and enrolled in Lincoln's Inn aiming to becoming a Barrister at Law. While in London, Aiyar became member of India House. Aiyar then began to take an active role in the militant struggle for Indian independence. Aiyar had a son and two daughters.

== Friends ==
Venkatesa Subramaniam Aiyar was a close friend of Shuddhananda Bharati; he started with him the Bharadwaja Ashram at Cheranmadevi.

== Political activities ==
Aiyar's militant attitude prompted the British Raj in 1910 to issue a warrant for his arrest for his alleged involvement in an anarchist conspiracy in London and Paris. Aiyar resigned from the Lincoln's Inn and escaped to Paris. Although he wished to remain in Paris as a political exile, he had to return to India. Aiyar landed in Pondicherry on 4 December 1910 disguised as a Muslim to escape arrest and remained there as exile. Aiyar remained in Pondicherry for over ten years. While in Pondicherry, Aiyar met with fellow revolutionaries Subramanya Bharathi and Aurobindo. In Pondicherry, Aiyar was involved in the plot to assassinate Ashe, the Collector of Tirunelveli. One of his students, Vanchinathan assassinated Ashe. Thus more trouble arose for Aiyar and his companion Subramanya Bharathi.

On 22 September 1914 the German cruiser SMS Emden entered the Madras harbour and bombarded the city. The British colonial government blamed this on the activities of the exiles in Pondicherry, and urged the French Governor to deport Aiyar and his companions to Africa. The French police brought several charges against the revolutionaries, but failed to convict them. During this period Aiyar translated the Tirukkural into English. He later revealed that he wanted to leave a legacy behind if he were forced to leave the country.

Aiyar returned to Madras after World War I and worked as the editor of the newspaper Desabhaktan (Patriot). He was arrested in 1921 on sedition charges and spent nine months in prison. While in prison Aiyar wrote the book A Study of Kamba Ramayana.

As a writer, Aiyar has often been referred to as the "founder" of the short story genre in Tamil.

== Cheranmahadevi Gurukulam issue ==
During Non-cooperation movement (1919–1922) there was a consensus among Indian National Congress followers to not sent their children to British educational institutions and Aiyar started a Gurukulam in Cheranmadevi with funding from Tamilnadu Congress. In 1923 - 24 a controversy over caste discrimination erupted over this school when Brahmin and Non Brahmin students were served food at separate places. Mahatma Gandhi tried to mediate and resolve this issue and the event had led Periyar to leave Congress in 1925 Kanchipuram conference and join Justice Party.

== Literary works ==
Aiyar translated the entire work of the Kural text in English prose, which became the first complete English translation by a native scholar. Aiyar's work is considered by various scholars, including Czech scholar Kamil Zvelebil, to be the most scholarly of all the English translations made until then, including those by native English scholars. He also translated the Ramavatharam written by Kambar in the 12th century CE.

== Personal life ==
V.V.S. Aiyar married Bhagyalakshmi Ammal and had a daughter named Subhadra and a son named Krishnamurthy. In the later years his son became a practicing medical doctor at Trichirapalli.

== Death ==
Aiyar drowned in the Papanasam falls, when trying to save his drowning daughter Subhadra, on 3 June 1925.

== See also ==
- Tirukkural translations
- Tirukkural translations into English
- List of translators into English
