= John Lazarus (missionary) =

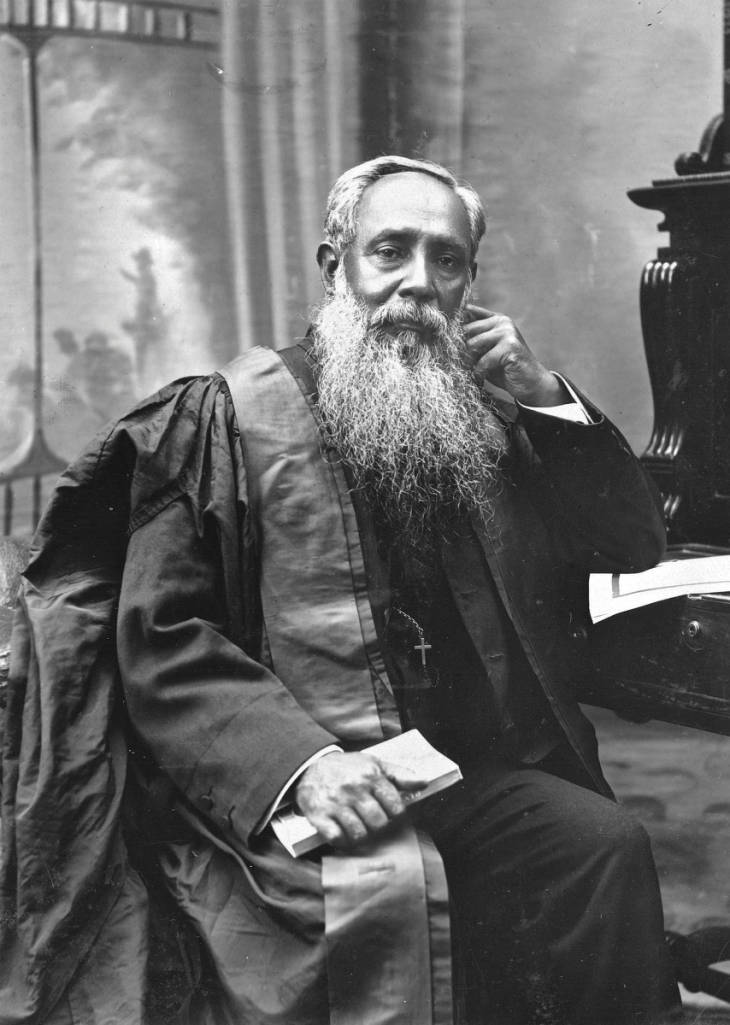
- John Lazarus
- Born: 1845
- Died: 1925 (aged 79–80)
- Occupation: Christian missionary
- Known for: Translating the Tirukkural into English

John Lazarus (1845–1925) was a Christian missionary to India who rendered the Tirukkural into English. He revised the work of his predecessor William Henry Drew, who had already translated the first 63 chapters (out of the total of 133 chapters) of the Tirukkural, and translated the remaining portion of the Kural text.

== Work ==
John Lazarus completed his graduation from the University of Madras. His first work was in 1878 when he published Nannul, a grammatical text, with an English translation meant for students. However, scholars consider his Tirukkural translation of chapters 64 through 133 (furthering the work of William Henry Drew) in 1885 A Dictionary of Tamil Proverbs with Introduction, Notes, Texts and Translation in 1894 as his greatest contributions to the Tamil literature. His Tirukkural work made him the first person to render into English prose the chapters 64 through 133 of the Kural text. The Dictionary of Tamil Proverbs contained 10,000 proverbs which remains the most complete collection ever made.

Being a Christian missionary, Lazarus, too, like G. U. Pope, initially claimed that Valluvar's ideas were partly influenced by Christianity. However, he later denied Pope's claim by saying the Kural portrays no traces of distinctively Christian ideas. None of the ten epithets by which God is described in the introductory chapters of the Kural text have the remotest connection with the concept of God as designated in the Bible. John Lazarus observes that, in stark contrast to the Bible's concept of killing, which refers only to the taking away of human life, the Kural's concept of killing pertains to both humans and animals as it "deals exclusively with the literal taking away of life". Kamil Zvelebil endorses this saying that the chapter of the Kural text on "non-killing" (chapter 33) deals exclusively with the literal taking away of life, without ambiguity, which suggest that the ethics of the Kural is rather a reflection of the Jaina moral code than of Christian ethics.

== See also ==
- Tirukkural translations
- Tirukkural translations into English
- List of translators into English
