= Shuddhananda Bharati =

Indian philosopher and poet (1897–1990)

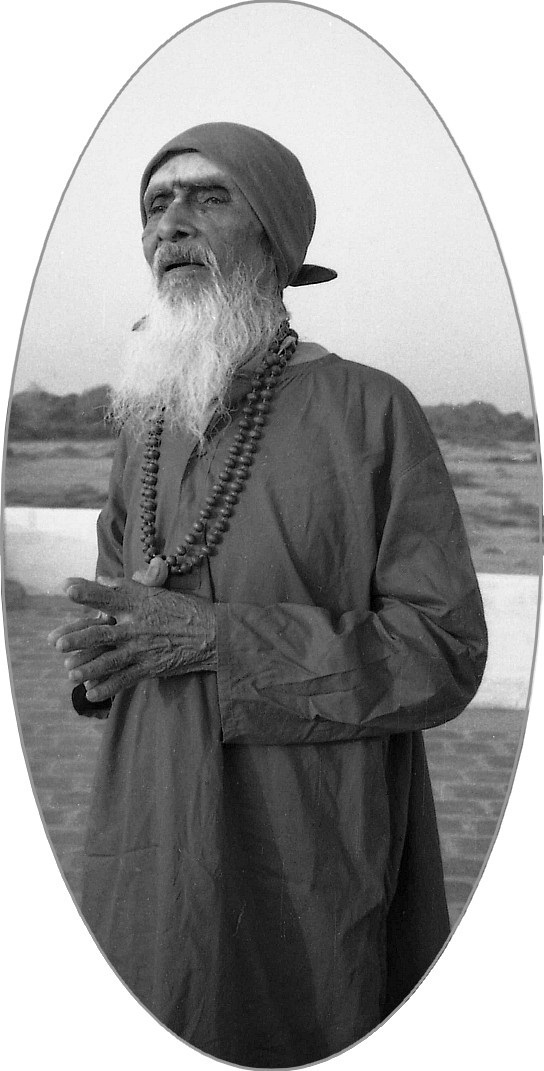
- Shuddhananda Bharati when he was about 80 years old

Personal life
- Born: 11 May 1897 Sivaganga
- Died: 7 March 1990 (aged 92) Sholapuram near Sivaganga

Religious life
- Religion: Hinduism

Quotation

Peace for All, Prosper for All.

Kavi Yogi Maharishi Dr. Shuddhananda Bharati (11 May 1897 – 7 March 1990) was an Indian philosopher and poet. His teachings are focused mainly on the search for God in Self, through the Sama Yoga practice he created.

== Biography ==
Bharati was born in Sivaganga in South India, and attained Maha Turya Samadhi in nearby Sholapuram in Sivaganga Maha Turya Samadhi Ceremony. He spent 25 years in silence in Pondicherry from 1925 to 1950, in the Ashram of Sri Aurobindo and the Mother Mirra Alfassa. From the early 1950s to the 1970s, he lived in today's Yogi Gardens, beside the IIT near Adyar, Chennai. Bharati always lived alone, without an Ashram. He founded Shuddhananda Bharati Desiya Vidyalayam High School in 1979.

Several of Bharati's disciples contributed to the construction of the main building of the school at Sholapuram in 1992.

== Works ==
Bharati wrote over 250 published works: 173 in Tamil, fifty in English, ten in French, four in Hindi and three in Telugu. He was also conversational in Sanskrit, Kannada, Malayalam and Urdu. He is the first translator to have done both verse and prose renderings of the Tirukkural into English. He also translated the novels of Victor Hugo, the plays of Moliere and Racine, and Dante's Divine Comedy into Tamil.

In his magnum opus Bharata Shakti, Bharati describes his ideal of "One humanity living in communion with a single God in a world transformed". The full work includes epic texts, lyrical dramas, operas, comedies, pastoral novels, news, biographies, comments on illustrated works, essays, poems in French corrected directly by the Mother, Sacred Odes, walks, Rondels and triplets. For this work, Shuddhananda Bharati received the Raja Rajan Awards (or Mannan Rajarajan Award) from the Tamil University in Tanjore in 1984, conferring upon him the title of Doctor of Literature. It's a prestigious honors presented annually in Thanjavur during the Sathaya Vizha — The birthday celebration of King Raja Raja Chola I — to recognize significant contributions to Tamil literature, history, and arts.

His autobiography, The Pilgrim Soul, includes encounters with well-known personalities of the past century, including Annie Besant, Sri Aurobindo, Meher Baba, Shirdi Sai Baba, V. V. S. Aiyar, Sacchidananda Shivabhinava Narasimha Bharati, Ramana Maharshi, C. V. Raman, Subramanya Bharathi, Sivananda, Romain Rolland, Jean Herbert and others.

=== In English ===
- Our Religion, L'Auberson, Éditions ASSA, 171 pages, ISBN 978-2-9700391-7-4
- Yoga for All, L'Auberson, Éditions ASSA, 152 pages, ISBN 978-2-9700391-5-0
- The Divine Master, L'Auberson, Éditions ASSA, 162 pages, ISBN 978-2-9700391-8-1
- The Secrets of Sadhana, L'Auberson, Éditions ASSA, 95 pages, ISBN 978-2-9700391-9-8
- Guiding Lights, L'Auberson, Éditions ASSA, 130 pages, ISBN 978-2-940393-00-8
- Gospel of Perfect Life, L'Auberson, Éditions ASSA, 226 pages, ISBN 978-2-940393-01-5
- Cosmic Riddles, L'Auberson, Éditions ASSA, 144 pages, ISBN 978-2-940393-02-2
- Mystic Treasure, L'Auberson, Éditions ASSA, 230 pages, ISBN 978-2-940393-03-9
- Pilgrim Soul, L'Auberson, Éditions ASSA, 503 pages, ISBN 978-2-940393-04-6
- Mahatma Ramalingam, L'Auberson, Éditions ASSA, 164 pages, ISBN 978-2-940393-05-3
- Sama Yoga, L'Auberson, Éditions ASSA, 172 pages, ISBN 978-2-940393-07-7
- Secrets of Sama Yoga, L'Auberson, Éditions ASSA, 183 pages, ISBN 978-2-940393-08-4
- Tamil Sentiment, L'Auberson, Éditions ASSA, 202 pages, ISBN 978-2-940393-09-1
- Poet Nightingale Bharathiyar, L'Auberson, Éditions ASSA, 213 pages, ISBN 978-2-940393-10-7
- Sri Krishna and His Gospel, L'Auberson, Éditions ASSA, 171 pages, ISBN 978-2-940393-11-4
- Silambu Selvam, L'Auberson, Éditions ASSA, 369 pages, ISBN 978-2-940393-12-1
- Secrets of Yoga, L'Auberson, Éditions ASSA, 236 pages, ISBN 978-2-940393-13-8
- Alvar Saint, L'Auberson, Éditions ASSA, 165 pages, ISBN 978-2-940393-15-2
- Thirukkural, L'Auberson, Éditions ASSA, 185 pages, ISBN 978-2-940393-17-6
- The Soul sings, L'Auberson, Éditions ASSA, 157 pages, ISBN 978-2-940393-18-3
- The Yoga Master, L'Auberson, Éditions ASSA, 189 pages, ISBN 978-2-940393-23-7
- The Revelation of Saint Meikandar, L'Auberson, Éditions ASSA, 103 pages, ISBN 978-2-940393-27-5
- The Magic Weapon of Shiva, L'Auberson, Éditions ASSA, 145 pages, ISBN 978-2-940393-29-9
- The Delightful Tamil Garden, L'Auberson, Éditions ASSA, 120 pages, ISBN 978-2-940393-28-2
- Art Temple, L'Auberson, Éditions ASSA, 296 pages, ISBN 978-2-940393-30-5
- Letters of Kavi Yogi, Volume 1, L'Auberson, Éditions ASSA, 191 pages, ISBN 978-2-940393-31-2
- Letters of Kavi Yogi, Volume 2, L'Auberson, Éditions ASSA, 174 pages, ISBN 978-2-940393-32-9
- Adi Shankara Bhagavan, L'Auberson, Éditions ASSA, 193 pages, ISBN 978-2-940393-34-3
- Bharata Shakti, Canto one, Emanation of the Pure One, L'Auberson, Éditions ASSA, 285 pages, ISBN 978-2-940393-40-4
- Bharata Shakti, Canto two, Gowri Kandam, L'Auberson, Éditions ASSA, 430 pages, ISBN 978-2-940393-41-1
- Bharata Shakti, Canto three, Sadhana Kandam, L'Auberson, Éditions ASSA, 471 pages, ISBN 978-2-940393-42-8
- Bharata Shakti, Canto four, Satyan at Danavam, L'Auberson, Éditions ASSA, 371 pages, ISBN 978-2-940393-43-5
- Bharata Shakti, Canto five, Victory of Shuddha Shakti, L'Auberson, Éditions ASSA, 313 pages, ISBN 978-2-940393-44-2
- Arrival of Mira, Love story between Bhojan and Mira, L'Auberson, Éditions ASSA, 133 pages, ISBN 978-2-940393-50-3
- The Integral Yoga of Sri Aurobindo, Live in Yoga with the Divine, a Life Divine !, L'Auberson, Éditions ASSA, 113 pages, ISBN 978-2-940393-51-0
- The Secrets of Shiva, L'Auberson, Éditions ASSA, 119 pages, ISBN 978-2-940393-55-8
- His sixtieh birthday celebration, L'Auberson, Éditions ASSA, 131 pages, ISBN 978-2-940393-56-5
- Illumination Hymn and Conference, L'Auberson, Éditions ASSA, 133 pages, ISBN 978-2-940393-57-2
- Voice of Tayumanar, L'Auberson, Éditions ASSA, 205 pages, ISBN 978-2-940393-59-6
- Poet's Forum, Kavi Arangam, L'Auberson, Éditions ASSA, 144 pages, ISBN 978-2-940393-60-2
- The Arrival of Buddha, L'Auberson, Éditions ASSA, 101 pages, ISBN 978-2-940393-61-9
- Fasting and Divinity, L'Auberson, Éditions ASSA, 104 pages, ISBN 978-2-940393-62-6
- The Grand Epic of Saivism, L'Auberson, Éditions ASSA, 257 pages, ISBN 978-2-940393-63-3
- Songs for Children, L'Auberson, Éditions ASSA, 100 pages, ISBN 978-2-940393-64-0
- Essence of Religion, L'Auberson, Éditions ASSA, 127 pages, ISBN 978-2-940393-65-7
- William Blake, L'Auberson, Éditions ASSA, 104 pages, ISBN 978-2-940393-66-4
- Francis Thompson, L'Auberson, Éditions ASSA, 97 pages, ISBN 978-2-940393-67-1
- Kama Thilagan and Vanarasu, L'Auberson, Éditions ASSA, 137 pages, ISBN 978-2-940393-68-8
- Chariot of Life, L'Auberson, Éditions ASSA, 207 pages, ISBN 978-2-940393-69-5
- Vivekanandam and The Story of our Independence, L'Auberson, Éditions ASSA, 137 pages, ISBN 978-2-940393-70-1
- Fire of Tamil, Thamizhkanal, L'Auberson, Éditions ASSA, 207 pages, ISBN 978-2-940393-71-8
- Sadasiva Brahman, the Silent Sage

=== Biographies and sources ===
- Sri Dewan Bahadur. A Study of all the works of Dr. Shuddhananda Bharati, L'Auberson, Éditions ASSA, 224 pages, ISBN 978-2-9700391-6-7
- The best known biography of Maharishi Yogi Kavi Dr. Bharati Shuddhananda is that written in his hand in his book Pilgrim Soul Extracts of Pilgrim Soul Editions ASSA, L'Auberson, Christian Piaget, ISBN 978-2-940393-04-6.
- Dancing with Shiva, Published by Himalayan Academy India, ISBN 978-0-945497-96-7

== See also ==
- List of translators into English
- The School in Sholapuram founded by Dr. Shuddhananda Bharati Shuddhananda Bharati Desiya Vidyalayam High School, in Sivaganga districk, near Madurai.
- Sama Yoga from Dr. Shuddhananda Bharati For health, energy, peace, bliss.
- The Secrets of Sama Yoga from Dr. Shuddhananda itself An elaborate treatise on the Yoga of Vedic Seers.
- His songs of Unity and Peace Anthem Peace for all, Peace for all, for all the countries Peace!
