= Francis Whyte Ellis =

British civil servant

- Born: 1777
- Died: 1819 (aged 41–42); Ramnad
- Occupations: Collector of Madras, translator, Tamil and Sanskrit scholar

Francis Whyte Ellis (1777–1819) was a British civil servant in the Madras Presidency and a scholar of Tamil and Sanskrit.

== Biography ==
Ellis became a writer in the East India Company's service at Madras in 1796. He was promoted to the offices of assistant-under secretary, deputy-secretary, and secretary to the board of revenue in 1798, 1801, and 1802 respectively. In 1806 he was appointed judge of the zillah of Machilipatnam, in 1809 collector of land customs in the Madras presidency, and in 1810 collector of Madras. He died at Ramnad of cholera on 10 March 1819.

== Dravidian language hypothesis ==
Ellis is the first scholar who classified the Dravidian languages as a separate language family. Robert Caldwell, who is often credited as the first scholar to propose a separate language family for South Indian languages, acknowledges Ellis's contribution in his preface to the first edition of A Comparative Grammar of the Dravidian or South Indian Family of Languages:

The first to break ground in the field was Mr. Ellis, a Madras civilian, whose was profoundly versed in the Tamil language and literature, and who interesting but very brief comparison, not of the grammatical forms, but only of some of the vocables of three Dravidian dialects, is contained in his introduction to Campbell's Telugu Grammar.

=== History ===
Ellis first published his notion about the South Indian languages forming a separate language family in a "Note to Introduction" for his protege Alexandar Duncan Campbell's Telugu Grammar in 1816. The event which set forth in motion the writing of the "Dravidian Proof" was the report of the Committee of Examination of Junior Civil Servants issued in 1811. The committee, chaired by Ellis, wanted the civil service officers to learn the basic structure of the South Indian languages, so that they can function effectively wherever they were stationed in South India. It noted that the common features of five South Indian "dialects" - High Tamil, Low Tamil, Malayalam, Telugu and Kannada and recommended the teaching of Tamil as a representative of all five. The College of Fort St. George and its press (see below), were given the task of creating grammars and other text books for the language training. As a part of this effort, Campbell, then the secretary to the Board of Superintendents of the college, prepared a work of Telugu grammar in 1816. Two years before, another work of Telugu grammar had been published by William Carey (an orientalist missionary from Calcutta) at the Serampore press, in which he described Sanskrit as the source of all South Indian languages. In his grammar, Campbell set out to disprove Carey and other Calcutta orientalists like Charles Wilkins and Henry Thomas Colebrooke (proponents of the "all Indian languages are derived from Sanskrit" school of thought). Ellis wrote a note to introduction for Campbell's book in which he offered his "Dravidian Proof".

=== The Dravidian Proof ===
Ellis' Dravidian Proof is a step by step attempt to establish the non-Sanskritic origins of Telugu. Ellis first compared the roots of Sanskrit and Telugu. Parallel columns of the roots were presented to show the difference between the two languages. For Sanskrit, the roots were taken from Dhatupatha and for Telugu, they were taken from a list compiled by Pattabhirama Shastri. In the second step, Ellis used a more complex comparative table of Tamil, Telugu and Kannada roots to show that the languages shared Cognate roots. In the third and final step Ellis used a comparative table of words made from the roots of the three languages to show their relationship as well. Ellis made use of Telugu scholar Mamadi Venkayya's Andhradipaka as a source for different types of Telugu words. As a conclusion, Ellis disproved the prevailing theory that though roots and words might be common to South Indian languages, the difference in their idioms was great. He accomplished this by translating the same passages from Sanskrit and English into Tamil, Telugu and Kannada and analysing the sentence structures of the translations.

== Other literary contributions ==
=== St. George College and its press ===
While stationed at Madras, Ellis became interested in the history and languages of India. He was a member of the Member of the Madras Literary Society and the founder of the college of Fort St. George at Madras - an institution which had both British and Indian members. Pattabiram Shasthri, Muthusami Pillai, Udayagiri Venkatanarayanayya, Chidambara Vaathiyaar and Syed Abdul Khadar were among Indian scholars who worked in the college. The college was founded in 1812 and the next year Ellis also helped set up the College Press by supplying it with a printing press and Tamil types. Telugu types, printing ink and labour for the venture was supplied by the Superintendent of Government Press at Egmore. The Madras Government supplied the paper. Ellis purchased English types and printing ink for the Press cheaply. The press commenced publishing in 1813 - its first work was Constanzo Beschi's (Veeramamunivar) Tamil grammar Kodum Tamil. Before Ellis's death in 1819, the press published a Tamil grammar primer Ilakkana surukkam, a Tamil translation of Uttara Kandam of Ramayana (both by Chitthambala Desikar), Ellis' own translation and commentary of Thirukkural and five Telugu works - Campbell's grammar (with Ellis' Dravidian Proof), tales of Vikkirama, a translation of Panchatantra and two more grammars. The press continued publishing books into the 1830s including works in Kannada, Malayalam and Arabic.

=== Works of Ellis ===
Ellis and his friends William Erskine and John Leyden were oriental scholars interested in learning about the various aspects of Indian life and publishing works on Indian languages. Ellis was a capable administrator and had a good relationship with Indians. He even adopted their customs and way of dressing. Among Ellis contributions to oriental scholarship are his works on South Indian property ownership, Hindu law, a "fake" French Veda and his commentary on Thirukkural. In 1814, Ellis wrote an account of the Mirasi land proprietary system of South India with the help of his Sheristadar (chief of staff), the Indian scholar Shankarayya. As his reputation for oriental scholarship grew, he was requested by Alexander Johnston to research the origins of a French work titled Ezour Vedam, which was claimed as a translation of a Sanskrit work and a Veda. Ellis proved that the "Vedam" was not a translation but an original work of the Jesuit priest Roberto de Nobili, written in 1621 for converting Hindus to Christianity. His monograph on the Ezour Vedam was published posthumously in the Asiatic Journal in 1822. He delivered a series of lectures on Hindu law at the Madras Literary Society, which were published after his death. Ellis had a high regard for Tamil poet-saint Tiruvalluvar and his Thirukkural. He translated 18 chapters of the Aratthupaal (one division of Thirukkural dealing with law and virtue) into English in a non-metrical verse. 13 of those chapters were published by the college press during Ellis' lifetime. Ellis was also the first scholar to decipher and explain the first century CE "Cochin Grants" given to the Anjuvannam Jewish community in Cochin. In addition to the "Dravidian Proof", Ellis wrote three dissertations - on Tamil, Telugu, and Malayalam.

It has been suggested that Ellis worked with others to promote vaccinations to prevent smallpox. In order to reduce resistance from Indians, he is thought to have helped craft a Sanskrit verse that was then claimed to have been discovered and described, showing that the European form of vaccination was in fact just a modification of something known in ancient India. The publication of the letter first inserted into the Madras Courier, in 1819 under the pseudonym "Calvi Virumbom" was widely propagated.

== Legacy ==
When Ellis died in Ramnad, he left some of his papers — philological and political — to Sir Walter Elliot, on whose death they passed to G. U. Pope, who had them placed in the Bodleian Library at Oxford. According to Sir Walter, many of Ellis' unpublished works were lost when they were burned by the cook of the Madurai collector Rous Petrie. Ellis did not publish them earlier because he wanted to do so only after becoming a "ripened scholar at forty years". As an administrator, Ellis was well liked by his Indian subjects. His grave at Dindigal bears two inscriptions - one in English and the other in Tamil. The English inscription reads:

Uniting activity of mind with versatility of genius, he displayed the same ardour and happy sufficiency on whatever his varied talents were employed. Conversant with the Hindoo languages and Literature of the Peninsula, he was loved and esteemed by the Natives of India, with whom he associated intimately.

Dalit activist Iyothee Thass has credited Ellis as being the forerunner of Tamil revivalism in the 19th century.

== See also ==
- List of translators into English
