= William Henry Drew (missionary) =

William Henry Drew was a 19th-century Christian missionary to India who rendered the Tirukkural into English. However, he translated only the first 630 couplets of the Tirukkural.

== Work ==
William Henry Drew was a missionary of the London Society in Madras. Drew rendered the Tirukkural into English in prose form and first published it in 1840. Of the 133 chapters of the Kural text, Drew translated only the first 63 chapters. The first edition also included the original Tamil text, Parimelazhagar's commentary, Ramanuja Kavirayar's amplification of the commentary, in addition to Drew's English prose renderings. Drew's rendering closely followed the commentary of Parimelalakar and thus almost remained close to the original work of Valluvar. In 1852, John Lazarus revised Drew's work (Chapters 1 through 63) and published it after completing the remaining portion of the Kural text, beginning from Chapter 64 through Chapter 133. Thus, Drew and Lazarus together made the first complete prose translation of the Tirukkural available in English.

As Robert Caldwell remarked, "Drew was a Devout man, a zealous missionary, a man of culture and devoted student of Tamil . . . His edition of the Kural, a great Tamil Classic, though he did not live to complete the work, placed him in the first rank of European Tamil scholars . . . I derived much benefit from the stimulus to Tamil studies that I received from my daily intercourse with Mr. Drew."

== Impact ==
One of the sheets of Beschi's Latin translation of the Kural text was found in the handwriting of W. H. Drew, which was kept in the India office Library. This manuscript was later used by Karl Graul for his Latin and German translations of the Kural.

== See also ==
- Tirukkural translations
- Tirukkural translations into English
- List of translators into English
