= George Uglow Pope =

Anglican Christian missionary and Tamil scholar

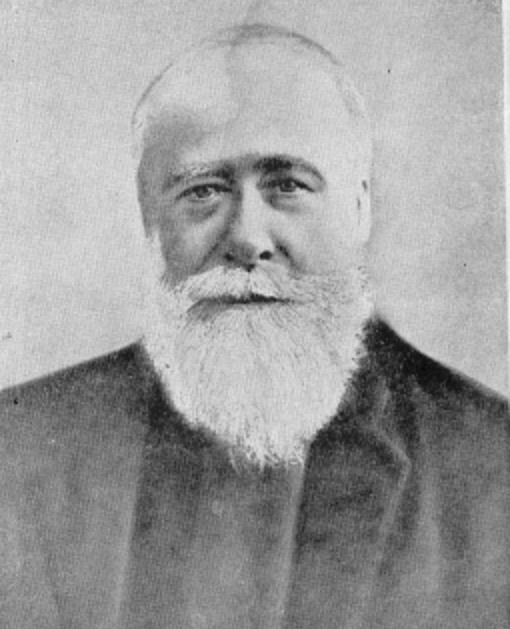
- Born: 24 April 1820; Bedeque, Prince Edward Island, Canada
- Died: 11 February 1908 (aged 87); Oxford, England
- Resting place: St Sepulchre's Cemetery, Jericho, Oxford, England
- Occupations: Anglican missionary; Tamil scholar; translator
- Spouses: Mary Carver (m. 1841–1845) Henrietta Page (m. 1849)
- Children: George Stevens Pope

George Uglow Pope (24 April 1820 – 11 February 1908), or G. U. Pope, was an Anglican Christian missionary and Tamil scholar who spent 40 years in Tamil Nadu and translated many Tamil texts into English. His popular translations included those of the Tirukkural and Thiruvasagam.

He later took to teaching, running his own school in Ootacamund (now Ooty) for while and then moving to head the Bishop Cotton Boys' School in Bangalore and after returning to England worked as a Lecturer at Balliol College, Oxford. A statue on the Chennai beach recognizes him for his contribution to the understanding and promotion of the Tamil language.

== Biography ==
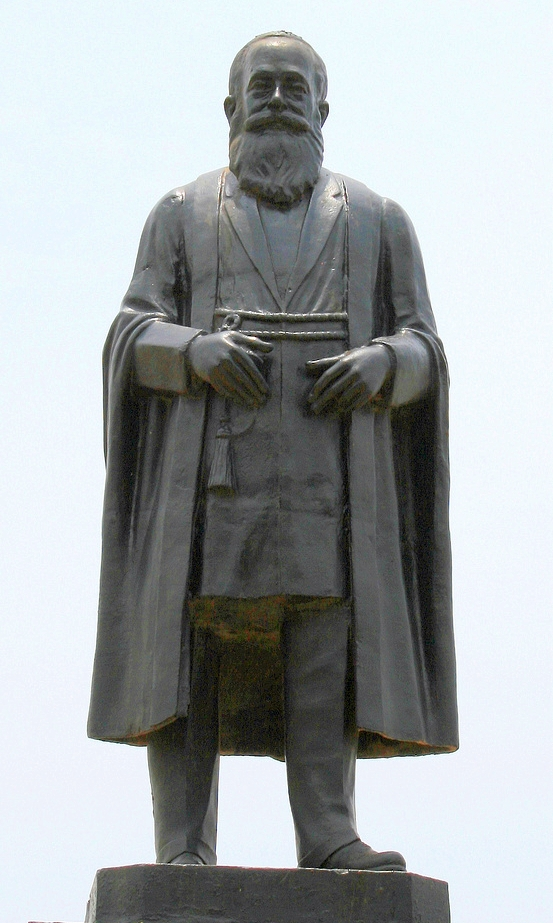
Statue of G. U. Pope in Triplicane, Chennai

George Uglow Pope was born on 24 April 1820 in Bedeque, Prince Edward Island in Canada. His father was John Pope (1791–1863), of Padstow, Cornwall, a merchant who became a missionary, who emigrated to Prince Edward Island in 1818, and Catherine Uglow (1797–1867), of Stratton, north Cornwall. The family moved to Nova Scotia, St. Vincent's before returning to Plymouth, England in 1826 where John Pope became a prosperous merchant and ship-owner. George Uglow Pope's and his younger brother William Burt Pope studied at the Wesleyan schools in Bury and Hoxton and at the age of fourteen George joined missionary service in southern India.

He left for South India in 1839 and arrived at Sawyerpuram near Tuticorin(now Thoothukudi) with the Society for the Propagation of the Gospel. Pope started studying Tamil as a teenager in England and during the voyage to India and Pope later turned into a scholar of Tamil, Sanskrit and Telugu. In 1841 he was ordained by the Church of England and he married Mary Carver, daughter of another Anglican priest. Pope worked in the Tirunelveli region where he also interacted with other missionaries like Christian Friedrich Schwartz. In 1845, Mary died at Tuticorin and Pope moved to Madras(now Chennai). He married Henrietta Page, daughter of G. van Someren and they left for England in 1849. During this period he worked with many figures in the Oxford Catholic movement including such as Cardinal Henry Edward Manning, Archbishop Trench, Bishop Samuel Wilberforce, Bishop John Lonsdale, E. B. Pusey, and John Keble.

Returning to Tanjore (now Thanjavur) in 1851, teaching at St Peter's School, he found himself in conflict with other missionaries. In 1855, a Tamil priest Vedanayakam Shastri who was a disciple of Schwartz and a poet in the court of Maharaja Serfoji was flogged publicly resulting in a separation of Tamil church free of the Anglican church leading to the resignation of Pope. He founded a seminary at Sawyerpuram for training Anglican Tamil clergy but this too ran into trouble and he decided to move to Ootacamund (now Ooty) in 1859. Here he founded a grammar school for European children (which ran from 1859 to 1870) which is now home to the Government Arts School and Stonehouse. The grammar school at Stonehouse cottage was opened by the Bishop of Madras on 2 July 1858 with Pope as Principal. The school moved elsewhere as the building was sold to the Trustees of the Lawrence Asylum in March 1859. Stonehouse cottage was then used to house the male asylum inmates and the Grammar school moved to new premises in Lovedale on 1 April 1869. He also founded Holy Trinity Church in Ooty. Pope was referred to with respect by the Tamilians.

Pope became famous for his strictness and in 1870 he was made principal of Bishop Cotton Boys' School at Bangalore. He was also the first pastor of the All Saints Church at Bangalore. In 1881, Pope left India and settled in Oxford where he made a mark as a lecturer in Tamil and Telugu (1884). He received an honorary MA in 1886 and a Gold Medal of the Royal Asiatic Society in 1906.

He died on 11 February 1908. He delivered his last sermon on 26 May 1907. Pope was buried at St Sepulchre's Cemetery, located in Jericho, central Oxford, England. After his death, his second wife, Henrietta, and two daughters received pension. Henrietta died on 11 September 1911 and is buried beside Pope. Three of their sons continued to work in India. John Van Someren Pope worked on education in Burma, Arthur William Uglow Pope served as a railway engineer in India and China; while Lieutenant-Colonel Thomas Henry served in the medical service as a professor of ophthalmology at the Madras Medical College.

== Contributions to Tamil studies ==
Pope was along with Joseph Constantius Beschi, Francis Whyte Ellis, and Bishop Robert Caldwell one of the major scholars on Tamil. His first work was A Catechism of Tamil Grammar (1842). His most famous work is the translation of the Tirukkural which he completed on 1 September 1886. His Sacred Kural contains introduction, grammar, translation, notes, lexicon and concordance. It also includes the English translation of F. W. Ellis and the Latin Translation of Constanzo Beschi with 436 pages. He had, by February 1893, translated Naaladiyaar, a didactic work of moral sayings in quatrains, 400 in number in 40 chapters, each by a Jain ascetic, according to a Tamil tradition. His magnum opus, the translation of Tiruvachakam appeared in 1900. Of this he said: "I date this on my eightieth birthday. I find, by reference, that my first Tamil lesson was in 1837. This ends, as I suppose a long life of devotion to Tamil studies. It is not without deep emotion that I thus bring to a close my life's literary work". He dedication this last work to Benjamin Jowett who had been a friend while serving as chaplain at Balliol College (1888).

- First lessons in Tamil: or a full introduction to the common dialect of that language, on the plan of Ollendorf and Arnold, Madras, 1856 (1st edition) - the next edition was published as:
- A Tamil hand-book: or full introduction to the common dialect of that language on the plan of Ollendorf and Arnold, Madras, 1859 (2nd edition), 1867 (3rd edition)
- A handbook of the ordinary dialect of the Tamil language, London, 1883 (4th edition, 3 volumes - Part 4-dictionary), Oxford 1904 (7th edition)
- One alphabet for all India (1859)
- A larger grammar of the Tamil language in both its dialects], Madras, 1858
- Pope's second catechism of Tamil grammar, 1858
- A text-book of Indian history; with geographical notes, genealogical tables, examination questions, and chronological, biographical, geographical, and general indexes, London, 1871 (1st edition), 1880 (3rd edition)
- திருவள்ளுவர் அருளிச்செய்த திருக்குறள் (Tiruvalluvar arulicceyta Tirrukkural). The 'Sacred' Kurral of Tiruvalluva-Nayanar, London, 1886
- முனிவர் அருளிச்செய்த நாலடியார் (The Naladiyar, or, Four hundred quatrains in Tamil), Oxford, 1893
- St. John in the Desert: an introduction and notes to Browning's 'a death in the desert', Oxford, 1897
- The Tiruvacagam; or, 'Sacred utterances' of the Tamil poet, saint, and sage Manikka-Vacagar: the Tamil text of the fifty-one poems, with English translation, Oxford, 1900
- A catalogue of the Tamil books in the library of the British Museum, London, 1909 (with L. D. Barnett)

== See also ==
- Tirukkural
- Tirukkural translations
- Tirukkural translations into English
- List of translators into English
- Thiruvasagam
- Tamil Nadu / South India
