= Rokuro Uemura =

Rokuro Uemura (上村 六郎; October 10, 1894 – October 29, 1991) was a Japanese researcher of dyeing and weaving culture.

== Biography ==
He was born in Niigata Prefecture, Kariwa District. His pseudonym was Genzin (げんじん, also read as Motondo). He graduated in dyeing from the Kyoto Higher Technical School and later from the Industrial Chemistry Department of the Kyoto Imperial University Faculty of Engineering. He served as an assistant at the same university, then as a lecturer at Kwansei Gakuin University in the Faculty of Science and Engineering, and as a professor at Mukogawa Women's University.

In 1950, he became a professor at Osaka University of Education. He retired in 1958 and in the same year received a Doctorate of Science from Kyoto University for his dissertation titled "Research on Color Names, Colors, and Dyeing in Ancient Japanese Literature." He also served as a professor at the Niigata Women's Junior College, the first president of Niigata Seiryo Women's Junior College, a professor at Shitennoji University, and the director of the Japan Dyeing and Weaving Academy. Additionally, he was the director of the International Dyeing and Weaving Museum within the Yūkariori Craft Museum in Asahikawa City.

He conducted research on ancient Japanese dyeing and weaving and was commissioned by the Imperial Household Agency to investigate the Shosoin textiles. He served as the president and honorary president of the Japan Dyeing and Weaving Culture Association. His collected works are published in six volumes.

== Publications ==
- 『Tamba-Nuno Studies』Folk Craft Series, Koseikai Publishing Department, 1931
- 『Eastern Dyeing Culture Research - Color Materials Edition』Daiichi Shobo, 1933
- 『Japanese Ancient Dye Plant Studies』Ooyama Shoten, 1934
- 『Ethnicity and Dyeing Culture』Yasukuni-sha, 1943
- 『Wartime True Dyeing - Wild Plant Dyeing』Yasukuni-sha, 1944
- 『Wild Plant Dyeing』Ooyashima Publishing, 1945
- 『Illustrated Simple Dyeing』Minakamiya, 1947
- 『Research on Color Names, Colors, and Dyeing in Ancient Japanese Literature』Sogeisha, 1957
- 『Standard Japanese Ancient Colors』Gakujido Shoten, 1960
- 『Journey of Folk Crafts in Southwest Asia - Searching for Color』Yamaguchi Shoten, 1962
- 『Tanba Cloth Stripe Book』Kyoto Shoin, 1964
- 『Japanese Colors - Japanese Beauty and Culture』Kawahara Shoten, 1965
- 『Japanese Plant Dyeing』Kyoto Shoin, 1966
- 『Life and Dyeing』Kawahara Shoten, 1970
- 『Colors and Dyeing of Okinawa and Folklore』Clothing Life Research Association, 1971
- 『Japanese Dyeing』Toto Publishing, 1974
- 『Rokuro Uemura Dyeing Collected Works』6 volumes, Shibunkaku Publishing

1. Eastern Dyeing Culture Research, Ethnicity and Dyeing Culture, 1979
2. Research on Color Names, Colors, and Dyeing in Ancient Japanese Literature, Japanese Ancient Dye Plant Studies, 1980
3. Manyo Dyeing Studies, Research on Manyo Dyeing, 1980
4. Folklore and Dyeing in Villages, 1980
5. Folklore and Dyeing in Villages, Cultural Musings, 1981
6. Journey of Folk Crafts in Hawaii and America, Musings on Travel, Journey of Folk Crafts in Echigo and Sado, Folk Craft Stories, Tanba Cloth, 1981

- 『History of Japanese Life Culture 3 - Colors and Dyeing』Mainichi Shimbun, 1980
- 『Research on Okinawa Dyeing Culture』Daiichi Shobo, Southern Islands Cultural Series, 1982
- 『Engishiki Dyeing Manual - Showa Edition』Iwanami Shoten, 1986
- 『Dyeing Musings』Iwanami Shoten, 1988

=== Co-authored and edited works ===
- 『Manyoshu Dyeing Studies』co-authored with Tatsumi Toshifumi, Kokon Shoin, 1930
- 『Old Dye Paper Book』edited by Huang Zhongan, 1941
- 『Great Dictionary of Japanese Color Names』co-authored with Yamazaki Katsuhiro, Kotori Shorin, 1943
- 『Color Album』co-authored with Yamazaki Katsuhiro, Yotokusha, 1949
- 『Dictionary of Academic Color Names』co-authored with Ogawa Sono, Kotori Shorin, 1951
- 『Echigo Paper Sample Book』co-authored with Yoshida Keisuke, Japanese Paper Research Association, 1954
- 『Persian Dyeing and Weaving』co-edited with Nakajima Yasunosuke, Unsodo, 1962
- 『Japanese Dyeing and Weaving Dictionary』co-edited with Tsuji Ai Kiyotaro and Tsuji Murajiro, Tokyodo Publishing, 1978
- 『Clothing and Life』co-authored, Dyeing and Life Publishing, 1979

== Papers ==
- CiNii>Rokuro Uemura
