= Takanobu Takahashi =

Japanese Indologist (born 1951)

- Born: 1951 (age 74–75); Mito, Ibaraki Prefecture Japan
- Other name: 高橋 孝信
- Occupation: Japanese Indologist
- Known for: Translating Tirukkural into Japanese

Takanobu Takahashi (高橋 孝信, Takahashi Takanobu; born 1951) is a Japanese Indologist, who is currently associate professor of Indian literature at International Buddhist University at Osaka, Japan. He is the second translator of the Kural into Japanese.

== Biography ==
Takanobu Takahashi was born in 1951 at Mito, Ibaraki Prefecture, Japan. He graduated in Indology from the University of Tokyo in 1979. His specialization included Sanskrit, Pali, and Tamil. He travelled to Tamil Nadu, India between 1979 and 1982 to learn Tamil at the Madurai Kamaraj University under the guidance of scholars such as Tamilannal. He continued his post graduation in the Tokyo University. His thesis included Literary Conventions of Sangam Literature, with special focus on the Kurunthogai (in Japanese). In 1989, he obtained his PhD in Indian literature from the University of Utrecht, for which he researched on the Akam genre of the Sangam Literature's love poetry and poetics from 1985 to 1988. He is currently associate professor at International Buddhist University, Osaka, Japan. He has published on Tamil literature, as well as Dravidian literatures.

In 1999, Takahashi translated the Tirukkural into Japanese and published it from Tokyo under the title Thirukkural: Sacred Verses of Ancient Tamil.

== Publications ==
- Takanobu Takahashi. (1989). Poetry and Poetics: Literary Conventions of Tamil Love Poetry. Rijksuniversiteit te Utrecht. 340 pages.
- Takanobu Takahashi. (1995). Tamil Love Poetry and Poetics. Leiden, New York, Cologne: E. J. Brill. ISSN 0925-2916. ISBN 90-04-10042-3
- Takanobu Takahashi. (1999). Thirukkural: Sacred Verses of Ancient Tamil. Tokyo: Heibonsha.

== See also ==
- Tirukkural translations
- Tirukkural translations into Japanese
- List of translators
