= The Kimono Project =

Japanese cultural heritage initiative

The Kimono Project was an initiative by the Imagine One World Organization in honor of the 2020 Olympics in Japan. It was launched in 2014. The project started in 2017 and was completed in 2021.

== Background ==
The Project commissioned 213 kimono representing each of the countries participating in the Olympic Games. The project was led by Yoshimasa Takakura, a Japanese designer.

The production of each kimono was estimated to cost 2 million yen, and was covered by donations from crowdsourcing campaigns as well as corporate sponsorship. The kimono were displayed at the 2020 Olympic Games in Japan, and will be displayed at the 2025 Osaka and Kansai Expo. The kimono are also displayed online.

Though most of the kimono were made by Japanese designers, two were not: the obi for the Palestinian kimono was created by refugees, using embroidery as the primary technique. The kimono designed for Indonesia was made using wax, using the batik technique.

== Recognition ==
The Project was awarded the Diplomas of Honor from the Ministry of Culture, Youth, and Sports in Ukraine.

== Finished kimono ==
The pictures of finished kimono for all countries can be found on the official kimono project site.
