= Tamba-Nuno =

Tanba-Nuno, (丹波布) is a type of fabric that is woven in Saji Village, Tanba Province (present-day Saji, Aogaki Town, Tanba City, Hyogo Prefecture). It is a hand-woven plain fabric made by interweaving hand-spun cotton and silk, and was mainly woven until the end of the Meiji era. It is recognized as a traditional craft of Hyogo Prefecture.

Originally, it was called Shimanuki or Saji Cotton, but since Soetsu Yanagi introduced it under the name "Tanba-Nuno" in his publication 'Mingei' in 1953, it became widely known by that name. Tanba-nuno is also sometimes called Tanba-fu.

== History ==
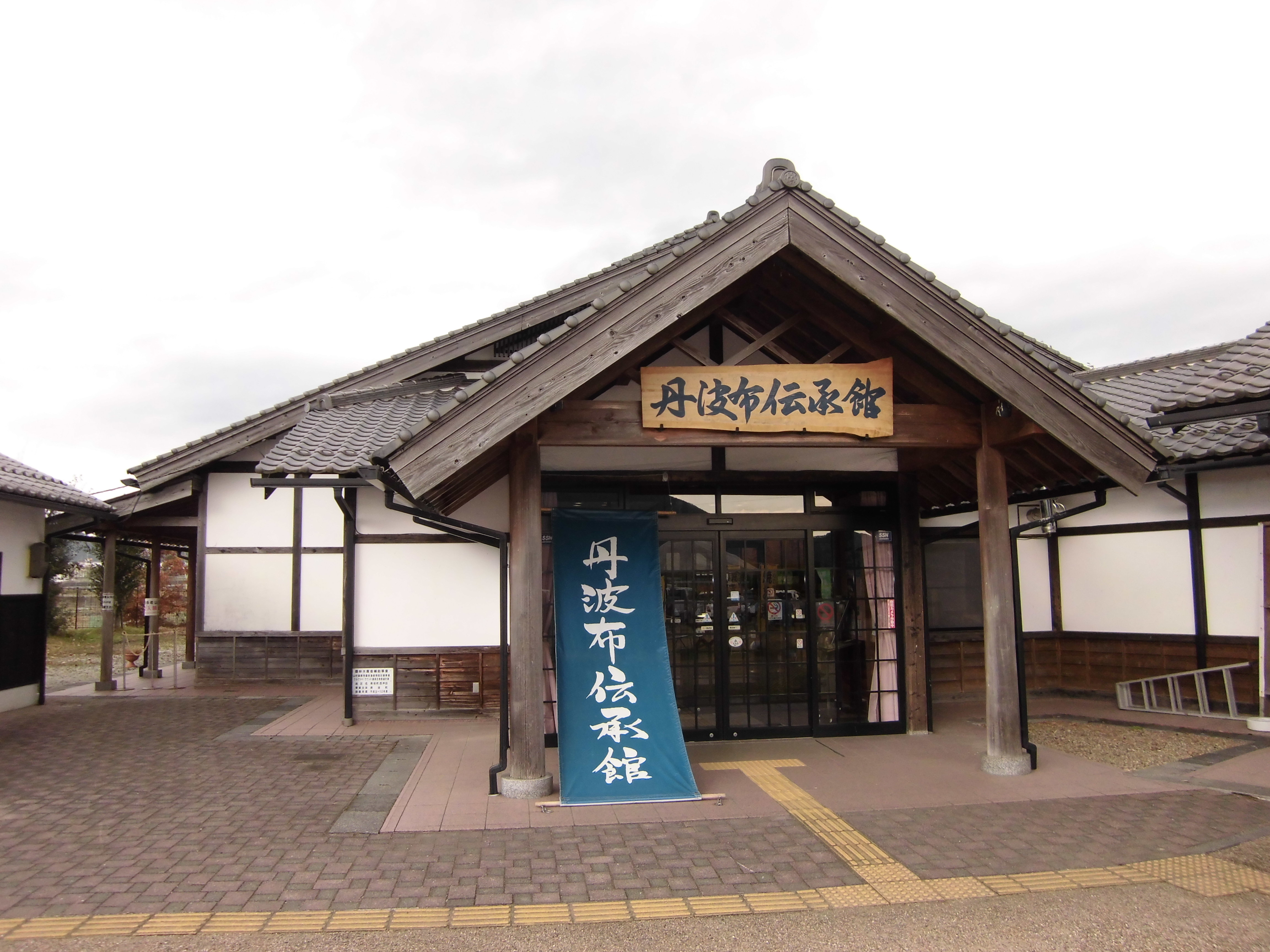
Tanba Folk Museum

=== Popularity and Decline ===
It is believed that the production of Tanba-nuno began during the Bunsei era (1818–1830), influenced by Banshu Cotton, and was primarily used as work wear. It was actively produced from the late Edo period to the early Meiji period and was sold around Kyoto as Saji Cotton. It was also used for making futons. Its popularity declined in the Taisho era.

=== Revival Movement ===
In the early Showa era, Soetsu Yanagi accidentally discovered a scrap of striped cotton at a morning market in Kyoto and asked craft researcher Rokuro Uemura to identify its origin. In 1931 (Showa 6), Uemura identified the striped cotton as Saji Cotton woven in Saji Village.

In 1953, the reproduction of Tamba Fabric was carried out under Uemura's guidance. In 1954, the Tamba Fabric Preservation Society was established with the support of Uemura and Yanagi. On March 30, 1957, it was designated as a Selected Intangible Cultural Property by the Japanese government.

In 1993, it was designated as a traditional craft of Hyogo Prefecture. In November 2017, a commemorative event "Fascinated by Tanba Fabric: The Footsteps of Revival" was held at Tanba no Mori Park to celebrate the 60th anniversary of its designation as a Selected Intangible Cultural Property.

The Tamba Fabric Traditional Craft Center is located at Michi-no-Eki Aogaki. In 2018 (Heisei 30), a shop specializing in Tamba Fabric, "Kogei no Mise Kabura," opened in Tanba City's Kaibara Town.

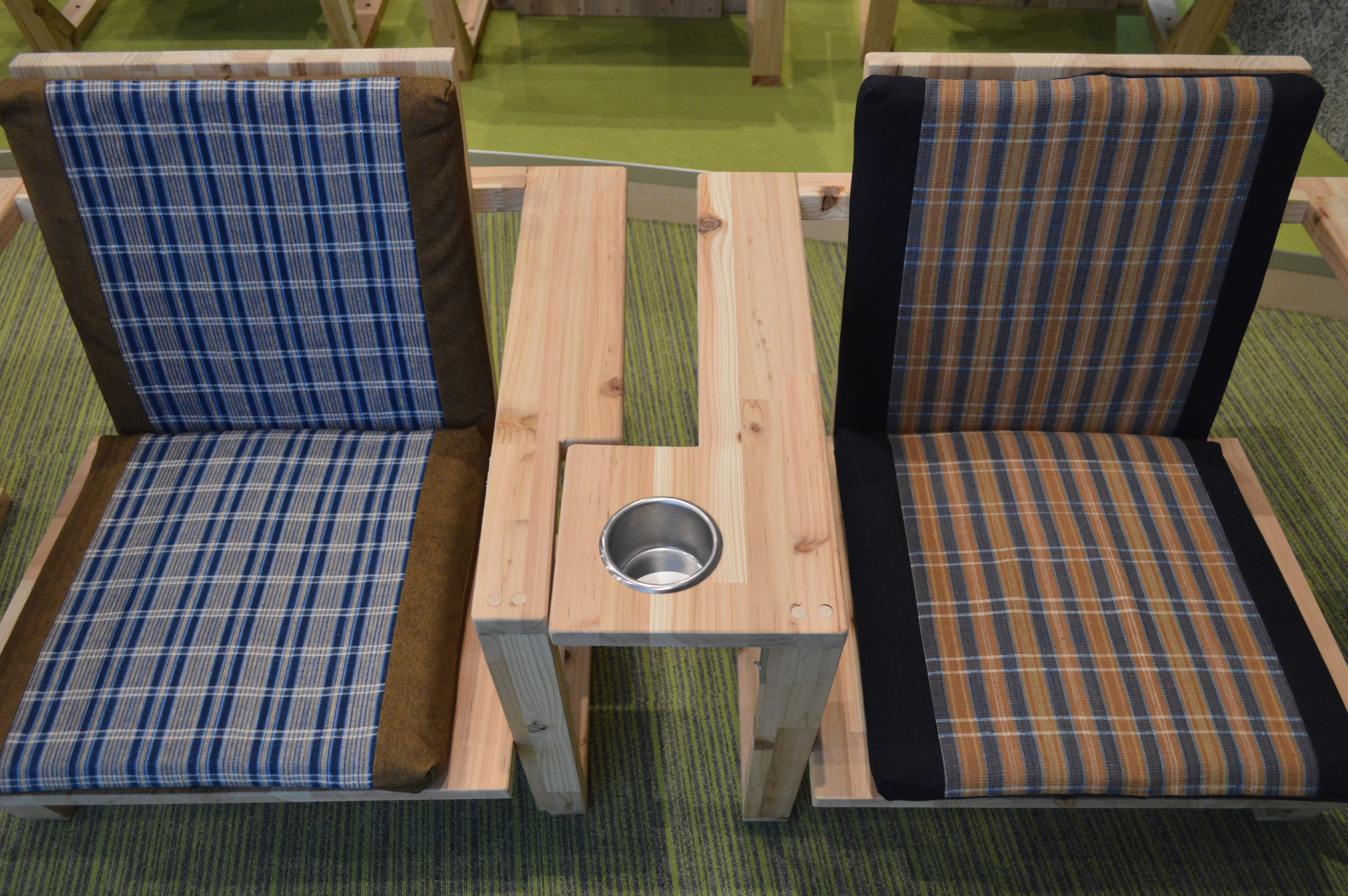
Chair using Tanba Fabric at the Ebisu Cinema

On July 30, 2021, the cinema Ebisu Cinema opened in Hikami Town, Tanba City. The hall of Ebisu Cinema is equipped with wooden chairs made from thinned wood, covered with Tamba Fabric hand-woven by graduates of the Tamba Fabric Traditional Craft Center.

== Characteristics ==
Tanba-nuno is a striped cotton plain weave, but its distinctive feature is the incorporation of "Tsumami yarn," spun from waste cocoons, into the weft.

The basic colors are indigo and brown, with stripes and checks woven in combinations of indigo and brown, green from a mix of indigo and yellow.

The dyes are derived from plants found in the village's surroundings. In addition to indigo, brown dyes are made from the bark of chestnut trees, yamamomo trees, and alder trees that grow in the nearby mountains. Yellow is produced primarily from koban grass that grows on the banks of rice paddies, as well as from the bark of Jerusalem artichoke and loquat trees.

Subtle and nuanced colors are achieved by use of various mordants, as well as dyeing threads for longer periods.

Soetsu Yanagi praised it for its "quiet and sober" appearance.

== Use as Kimono ==
Tanba-nuno is worn both as kimono, as well as obi. It is considered a casual kimono by the contemporary kimono canon. It is often tailored unlined, and worn from September through May.

== Bibliography ==
- Fumie Yoshida 'People Fascinated by Tamba Fabric', Hokuseisha, 2013
