= Shuzo Matsunaga =

Japanese engineer and translator (born 1921)

- Born: 1921 (age 104–105); Japan
- Known for: Translating Tirukkural into Japanese

Shuzo Matsunaga (Japanese: 松永脩蔵) (born 1921) is a Japanese engineer best known for translating the Kural into Japanese from its English version.

== Biography ==
Shuzo first read a translation of a few couplets of the Kural in the 1970s and developed an interest in reading more of it. He wrote to his pen-friend Shekar in Omalur, Salem, Tamil Nadu, India about his interest, and Shekar's father S. M. Muthu, an avid lover of Tamil literature, sent Shuzo a copy of G. U. Pope's English translation of the Kural. Shuzo soon began translating the entire work into Japanese and completed it in 1980, for which he corresponded with Muthu seeking clarifications about the ancient work in 50-odd letters.

In 1981, his another penpal, C. Thanaraj, arranged for Shuzo's maiden trip to India to attend the fifth World Classical Tamil Conference to be held in Madurai, where Shuzo presented his research essay on the Kural. Upon Muthu's request, Shuzo also translated poet Bharathiar's Kuyil Paatu into Japanese, which won an award and cash prize from the Thanjavur Tamil University. Shuzo also translated Manimekalai, Naaladiyar, Panchathanthira Kathaigal and Voice of Vallalar into Japanese.

Shuzo also authored a book titled My India As Seen Through Letters, explaining his experience with the Indian culture all through the correspondence with Muthu.

== Opinions and quotes ==
Shuzo opines about the Kural text thus:

The most interesting characteristic of the Kural-love songs is the independence of the body of a person. Heart, face, soul, eyes, hands, forehead, or even the pallid complexion of the face shows their character uncontrollable by the person himself. Such an expression rouses deeper and deeper emotions. Towards the end of the Kural love songs, we can see a vivid love quarrel between husband and wife caused by the sneeze of the husband. This description is so fresh and animated that I feel as if I were watching a home frama on TV.

The Kural is the core of the spirit of the Tamil people. And the most remarkable point is that it is threaded through with "Love to the others."

== See also ==
- Tirukkural translations
- Tirukkural translations into Japanese
- List of translators
