= Tirukkural translations into Japanese =

As of 2015, the Japanese language has two translations available of the Tirukkural.

== History ==
The first Japanese translation of the Kural text was made by Shuzo Matsunaga in 1981. Work on the translation began in the 1970s when Matsunaga chanced upon a few translated lines from the original work. Through his pen-pal in India, he obtained guidance and a copy of an English translation of the work by George Uglow Pope. Having completed the translation by 1980, he published it the next year when he also attended the 5th World Classical Tamil Conference in Madurai in 1981, where he presented his research essay on the Kural. Matsunaga also translated it into Korean.

The second translation of the work was made by Japanese Indologist Takanobu Takahashi in 1999, which was titled Thirukkural: Sacred Verses of Ancient Tamil (ティルックラル: ティルヴァッルヴァル=著 高橋孝信=訳). 南インドのタミル地方で，今もなお誰もが口にする1300余の箴言。6世紀頃につくられ，法・財・愛をテーマにインド的思考を結晶させた聖なる短詩 (ティルックラル) を，詳細な注釈で読み解く) and was published by Heibonsha, Tokyo.

In 2023, as part of its Ancient Tamil Classics in Translations series, the Central Institute of Classical Tamil (CICT) in Chennai released its Japanese translation of the Kural by Balamurugan Kasinathan.

== Legacy ==
The first Japanese translation of the Kural, which was made with the guidance of S. M. Muthu, an Indian scholar of Tamil, eventually led to the Japanese government felicitating him for his services to Japanese literature by issuing commemorative stamps bearing his picture in 2007. From the 50 odd letters through which Shuzo Matsunaga corresponded with Muthu during the translation work, Shuzo went on to publish his learning about the Indian culture in a book titled My India As Seen Through Letters.

== See also ==
- Tirukkural translations
- List of Tirukkural translations by language
