= Hakata-ori =

Culturally important Japanese fabric produced in Fukuoka Prefecture

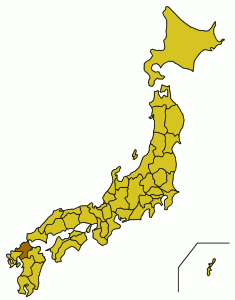
Fukuoka Prefecture, Japan

Hakata-ori (博多織) is a traditional Japanese textile that has been produced in Fukuoka Prefecture for more than 770 years.

There are two varieties of hakata-ori: kenjo hakata-ori and mon ori hakata-ori. Kenjo hakata-ori is woven in a traditional pattern related to Buddhist beliefs, and was influenced by fabrics produced in Sui dynasty China. Mon ori hakata-ori is the name used for hakata-ori containing multi-coloured designs.

Hakata-ori is most commonly found as the material for men's obi, though both men and women wear hakata-ori obi. Hakata-ori is also used to produce a number of different products not related to kimono and kimono accessories, such as handbags, neck ties and scarves.

== History ==
Hakata-ori traces its history back to 1235 CE (Kamakura period Japan), when a Japanese merchant from Fukuoka Prefecture, Mitsuda Yazaemon, travelled to Song dynasty China with the Buddhist monk Shoichi Kokushi to learn Song-period trades and traditions, such as the making of manjū (traditional Japanese cakes), ceramic production techniques, gold leaf,, the production of musk tablets wheat noodles and textile production techniques.

Six years later (1241 CE), they returned to Japan, with Yazaemon bringing along the technique of textile production which would later develop into hakata-ori and utilising it to begin his textiles business.

250 years later in the 16th century, Yazaemon's descendant, Mitsuda Hikosaburo, returned to China (Ming dynasty) to further study in-depth the production of their textiles. Having learnt new Ming dynasty-period techniques, Hikosaburo then combined these with the Song dynasty-period textile techniques previously brought back by his ancestor. The improved-upon textile was known as fusenmon and ryujo, a taffeta-like material with a raised stripe.

Following this, the textile was developed further until eventually becoming the weaving technique of hakata-ori in the present day. The name hakata-ori is taken from the location of the technique's original development within Japan (Hakata, Fukuoka Prefecture), and from the word ori, meaning weaving or fabric. It is also the origin of the hakata obi.

In 1600s, during Edo period (1603–1868), the feudal lord of the Fukuoka clan (Chikuzen Province), Nagamasa Kuroda, chose hakata-ori textiles to be presented to the Tokugawa shogunate, Iemon Takewaka as tribute. The word kenjo-gara – sometimes used to describe kenjo hakata-ori – derived from this action. In 1815, the textile became popular when a kabuki actor wore an obi made from hakata-ori onstage. The original use for hakata-ori was as fabric for obi, mostly for men wearing kimono or yukata. It is favoured as an obi fabric for its stiff, sturdy weave, making it easy to tie obi knots (known as obi musubi) that will not slip and loosen with wear. Therefore, it was commonly worn by samurai who needed to tuck their katana (sword) into the belt of their kimono. However, during the Meiji period, hakata-ori obi for women were also developed.

== Varieties ==
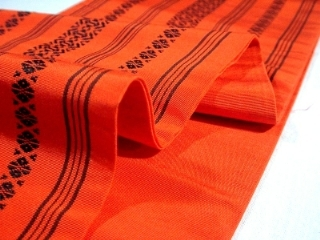
Kenjogara obi showing the central patterned dokko stripe and two thinner, patterned hanazara stripes

The two varieties of hakata-ori (kenjo hakata-ori and mon ori hakata-ori) differ in their woven decoration, though both are a sturdy, stiff material often used as an obi without a lining, second fabric layer or stiffener. Hakata-ori is typically woven from silk yarns, though cheaper and more casual varieties of the fabric may be woven from cotton or synthetic fibre yarns.

=== Kenjo (kenjogara) hakata-ori ===
Kenjo hakata-ori is the term for hakata-ori featuring a pattern known as kenjogara (stemming from kenjo, a gift given to a superior, and gara, meaning 'pattern').

The kenjogara pattern features sets of long, uninterrupted stripes at each edge and in the centre of the fabric, and sets of patterned stripes either side of the central sets of lines. The wider patterned stripe, known as dokko (which is a kind of vajra phurba), represents an item used in Buddhist worship to banish harmful energies. The thinner patterned stripe, known as hanazara, is also taken from Buddhist worship, and represents the plate used in Buddhist rituals to hold flower petals or incense.

For this variety of hakata-ori, only five colours are ever used, following the colour symbolism used in Sui dynasty China, where individual colours held their own important meaning: for instance, purple, historically worn only by the nobility, held the meaning of elegance and virtue. Red was associated with happiness and prosperity; yellow was associated with sincerity and trust; blue was associated with honour and peace, and navy blue was associated with wisdom and solidity.

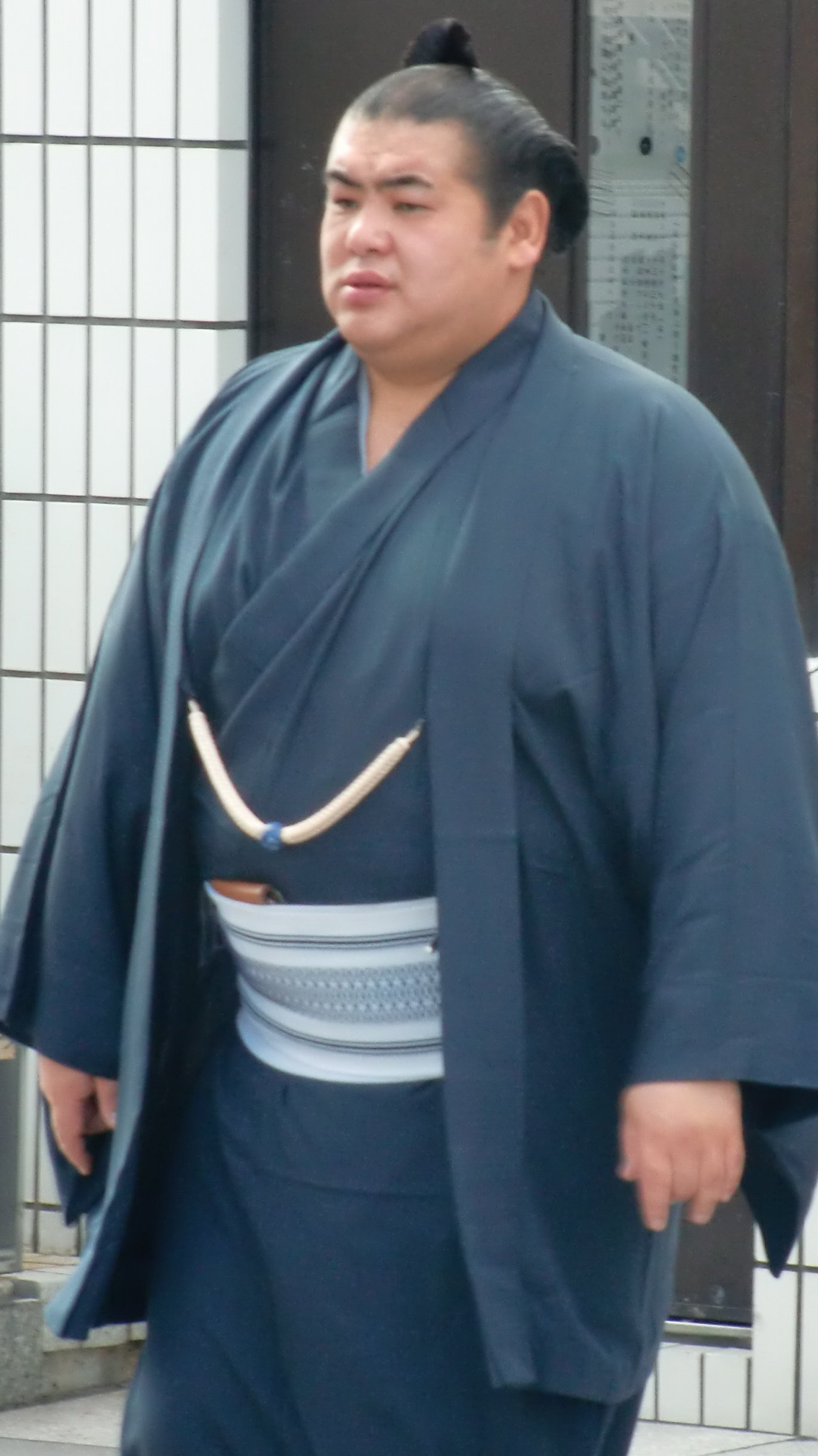
Obi made from hakata-ori, worn by a sumo wrestler

=== Mon ori hakata-ori ===
Mon ori hakata-ori is the name used for hakata-ori textiles that have multi-coloured designs. First woven in the Edo period (1603–1868), the technique of weaving mon ori hakata-ori was developed further in the Meiji period, following the introduction of the Jacquard weaving machine to Japan in 1886.

== Production process ==
Hakata-ori is made by weaving a thin warp yarn and a thicker weft yarn together in a tightly packed weave to create a stiff, ribbed appearance. The woven patterns seen in hakata-ori are created using the warp yarn.

The production of hakata-ori is divided into four stages: designing, dyeing the yarns, preparing to weave and weaving.

1. Designing (known as isho) – the first stage of making hakata-ori. Both the pattern and the colour of the fabric are decided upon before being drawn onto the requisite plotting paper.
2. Dyeing (known as ito kui) – the second stage of production. For a silk hakata-ori fabric, the yarns are first washed in soapy water, before the weft and warp yarns are dyed in a boiling dyebath, a process which requires a specialist craftsperson due to the sensitive nature of dyework.
3. Preparation for weaving (known as hatajikake) – the warp yarns are hooked onto the Jacquard loom, with the weaver able to manipulate the warps vertically by the use of foot pedals.
4. Weaving (known as uchikaeshi mitsuuchi) – the thin warp yarns and thicker weft yarns are woven to create a ribbed-texture fabric, with the warp yarns forming the woven pattern on the fabric.

Although the production of hakata-ori is mostly mechanised and automated in the modern day, it is still necessary for specialised workers to check the patterns and threads of hakata-ori in the production process.

== Uses ==
Hakata-ori is most commonly used as fabric for obi worn with kimono by both men and women; it is a popular choice for men's obi due to its stiff and tightly woven nature, particularly attractive when tying the knots used for men's kaku obi.

Though most commonly seen in traditional clothing, hakata-ori is also produced for use in accessories such as handbags, neck ties and card holders.

== Trademark ==
The trademark "hakata-ori (博多織)" belongs to Hakataori Industrial Association. Their trademark is registered on March 9, 2017, with the registration number 5031531. The specifically trademarked products are silk textiles and Japanese cloth made in Fukuoka city, and other 21 cities which use the technique that originated in the Hakata area, Fukuoka Prefecture. Although section 3(1)(iii) of the Trade Mark Act says that a collective trademark cannot be registered as long as it contains a regional name or product name, if the product in question is considered to be "particularly distinctive", to the extent that of all people over Japan recognize it, an exception to this clause is made, allowing a trademark to be registered under section 3(2) of the Trade Mark Act. The purpose of regional collective trademark is to protect the regional brands that are not associated with specific commercial origin, but with geographical area.

The trademark was filed due to the concurrence of other enterprises engaged in similar business in the same geographical area, who, though not a member of the association, used a similar or identical trademark as the regional collective trademark. There are three parties who used the similar trademark as Hakataori Industrial Association and violated the Trade Mark Act and the Unfair Competition Prevention Act: Nihon Wasou Holdings, Inc., who sell Japanese clothing and other related items; the Hakata Takumi Kohgei Corporation, a subsidiary of Nihon Wasou Holdings, Inc., and sell obi; and the Hakata Textile Products Association, who used a certificate stamp on their goods using the same trademark as Hakataori Industrial Association.

The second party, Hakata Takumi Kohgei Corporation, had asked to become a member of the Hakataori Industrial Association in order to use the same trademark, but were rejected. In March 2009, Hakataori Industrial Association warned Hakata Takumi Kohgei Corporation from using a similar trademark to theirs. As a result, Hakata Takumi Kohgei Corporation changed their mark from "hakata-ori" to "hakata-obi". In May 2010, Hakata Takumi Kohgei Corporation asked Hakataori Industrial Association once again and were again rejected.

Fukuoka District Court solved the problems between them by applying the Sec. 26(1)(ii) (acts of descriptive use), so that Hakata Takumi Kohgei Corporation could continue to use the trademark similar to that of the Hakataori Industrial Association's, with the caveat that the trademark could not be used in the same manner as before.

== See also ==
- Japanese craft
- List of Traditional Crafts of Japan
