= Shitennoji University =

Private university in Osaka, Japan

Coordinates: 34°32′49.37″N 135°34′59.42″E

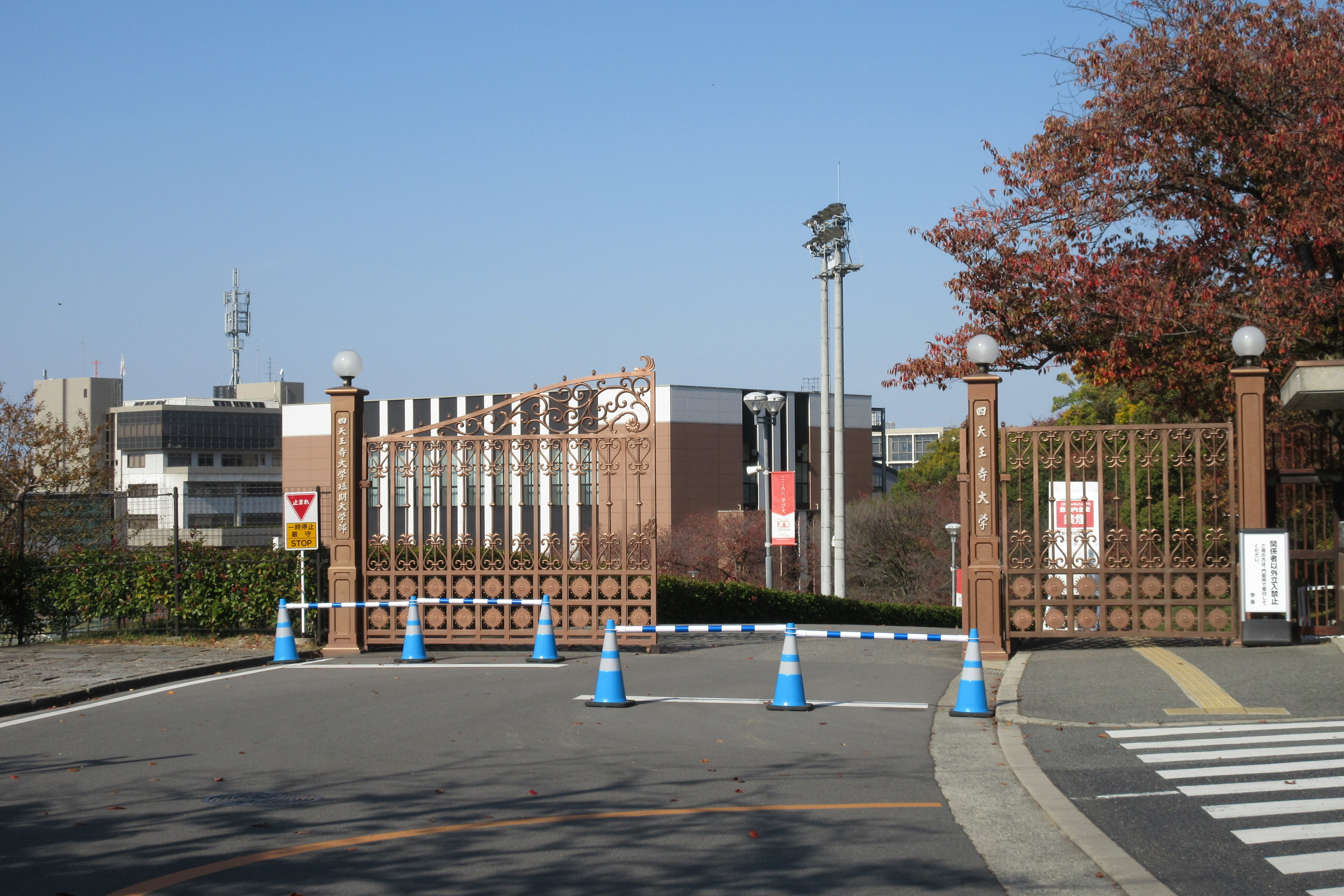
Shitennoji University Main Gate

Shitennōji University (四天王寺大学, Shitennōji daigaku) is a private university in Habikino, Osaka, Japan. The predecessor of the school was founded in 1922, and it was chartered as a junior women's college in 1957. The school became a four-year college in 1967, and it became coeducational in 1981, adopting the present name at the same time. The school is also known as International Buddhist University, or IBU.

== Name ==
Shitennō (四天王) refers to the Four Heavenly Kings (Dhrtarastra, Virudhaka, Virupaksa, and Vaisravana). Ji (寺) means temple. See Shitennoji.

== History ==
About 1400 years ago Prince Shōtoku went to this place to study Buddhism, and it was founded as a place of education.
