= Porul (Kural book) =

The Book of Poruḷ, in full Poruṭpāl (Tamil: பொருட்பால்; lit. 'division of wealth' or 'polity'), also known as the Book of Wealth, Book of Polity, the Second Book or Book Two in translated versions, is the second of the three books or parts of the Kural literature, authored by the ancient Indian philosopher Valluvar. Written in High Tamil distich form, it has 70 chapters each containing 10 kurals or couplets, making a total of 700 couplets all dealing with statecraft. Poruḷ, which means both 'wealth' and 'meaning', correlates with the second of the four ancient Indian values of dharma, artha, kama and moksha. The Book of Poruḷ deals with polity, or virtues of an individual with respect to the surroundings, including the stately qualities of administration, wisdom, prudence, nobility, diplomacy, citizenship, geniality, industry, chastity, sobriety and teetotalism, that is expected of every individual, keeping aṟam or dharma as the base.

== Etymology and meanings ==
Poruḷ is the Tamil word that corresponds to the Sanskrit term 'artha', and pāl refers to 'division'. Similar to its cousins aṟam (dharma), inbam (kama), and veedu (moksha), poruḷ as a concept includes multiple meanings, rendering it almost impossible to capture its meaning in a single word in any non-Indian language. The term artha, however, is common to all Indian languages.

As one of the four mutually non-exclusive aims of human life in Indian philosophy called the Puruṣārtha, poruḷ literally translates as "meaning, sense, goal, purpose or essence" depending on the context. Poruḷ is also a broader concept in the scriptures of Hinduism. As a concept, it has multiple meanings, all implying "means of life", activities and resources that enable one to be in a state one wants to be in.

Poruḷ applies to both an individual and a government. In an individual's context, poruḷ includes wealth, career, activity to make a living, financial security and economic prosperity. At government level, poruḷ includes social, legal, economic and worldly affairs. Proper pursuit of it is considered an important and necessary objective of both the individual and the government.

John Lochtefeld describes artha as the means of life, and includes material prosperity. Karl Potter explains it as an attitude and capability that enables one to make a living, to remain alive, to thrive as a free person. It includes economic prosperity, security and health of oneself and those one feels responsible for. Artha includes everything in one's environment that allows one to live. It is neither an end state nor an endless goal of aimlessly amassing money, claims Karl Potter, rather it is an attitude and necessary requirement of human life. In a different viewpoint, John Koller suggests artha is not an attitude, rather it is one of the necessities of human life. A central premise of Hindu philosophy, claims Koller, is that every person should live a joyous and pleasurable life, that such fulfilling life requires every person's needs and desires be acknowledged and fulfilled, that needs can only be satisfied through activity and when sufficient means for those activities are available. Artha, then, is best described as pursuit of activities and means necessary for a joyous and pleasurable life. Daya Krishna views artha as a subset of kama and karma.

Vatsyayana in Kama Sutra defines artha as the acquisition of arts, land, cattle, wealth, equipages and friends. He explains, artha is also protection of what is already acquired, and the increase of what is protected. Gavin Flood explains artha as "worldly success" without violating dharma (moral responsibility), kama (love) and one's journey towards moksha (spiritual liberation). Flood clarifies that artha in ancient Hindu literature, as well as purushartha, is better understood as a goal of Man (not a man). In other words, it is one of the four purposes of human life. The survival and the thriving of humans requires artha—that is, economic activity, wealth and its creation, worldly success, profit, political success and all that is necessary for human existence.

Medieval commentators such as Pariperumal, Ilampooranar, and Nacchinarkkiniyar define porul as essential elements of a state. Pariperumal's definition to porul provides an overall synopsis to the chapters of the Book of Porul. According to S. N. Kandasamy, within the Kural literature the term poruḷ takes various meanings, including asset, meaning, possession, wealth, good result, virtue, quality, reality, deed, importance or essentiality, and good things.^{[a]} Kandasamy further states that despite all the vast variations in meaning, the term poruḷ primarily means the ultimate reality.^{[b]}

== The book and its chapters ==
The Book of Poruḷ talks about the interpersonal skills of an individual that are essential to lead a meaningful life in the society. It covers both political and economic matters. With 70 chapters, the Book of Poruḷ is the largest of the three books of the Kural text. The chapters chiefly deal with polity and administration, including citizenship and social relations, in a manner similar to the Hindu text Arthasastra. According to Czech Indologist Kamil Zvelebil, Valluvar "undoubtedly" bases some of his teachings in the Book of Poruḷ on the then extant Sanskrit works such as the Arthashastra. The text insists on a royalty with ministers bound to a code of ethics and a system of justice rather than democracy. In the words of K. V. Nagarajan, the king, according to Valluvar, is assigned the "role of producing, acquiring, conserving, and dispensing wealth". The king's duty is to provide a just rule, be impartial and have courage in protecting his subjects and in meting out justice and punishment. Valluvar insists that an army has a duty to kill in battle, and a king must execute criminals for justice,^{[c]} but does so only after emphasizing non-killing as every individual's personal virtue in the Book of Aṟam. The book also cautions against tyranny, oppression and nepotism, with the suggestion that such royal behavior ultimately results in disasters, depletes the state's wealth and ultimately results in the loss of power and prosperity. The book, in a social and political context, recommends a death sentence for the wicked only as a means of justice. Valluvar presents his theory of state using six elements: army (patai), subjects (kuti), treasure (kul), ministers (amaiccu), allies (natpu), and forts (aran), recommending forts and other infrastructure, supplies and food storage in preparation for siege. A king and his army must always be ready for war, and should launch a violent offensive, at the right place and right time, when the situation so demands and particularly against corrupt kingdoms. A good and strong kingdom must be protected with forts made of thick, high and impenetrable walls. The text recommends a hierarchical military organization staffed with fearless soldiers who are willing to die in war.

As with Books I and III of the Kural text, the author did not group the chapters under any subdivisions. However, the ten medieval commentators, who were the first to write commentaries about the Tirukkural, divided the Book of Poruḷ variously between three and six portions. For example, while Parimelalhagar divides the book into three parts, namely, kingship (royalty), elements of sovereignty (angas or limbs of the state) and common duties, other medieval scholars have divided the Book of Poruḷ into five or even six portions.

Outline of the Book of Poruḷ

Book Two—Wealth (பொருட்பால் Poruṭpāl)

- Chapter 39. The Greatness of a King (இறைமாட்சி iṟaimāṭci): 381–390
- Chapter 40. Learning (கல்வி kalvi): 391–400
- Chapter 41. Ignorance (கல்லாமை kallāmai): 401–410
- Chapter 42. Hearing (கேள்வி kēḷvi): 411–420
- Chapter 43. Knowledge Possession (அறிவுடைமை aṟivuṭaimai): 421–430
- Chapter 44. Error Correction (குற்றங்கடிதல் kuṟṟaṅkaṭital): 431–440
- Chapter 45. Seeking the Aid of Great Men (பெரியாரைத் துணைக்கோடல் periyārait tuṇaikkōṭal): 441–450
- Chapter 46. Avoiding Mean Associations (சிற்றினஞ்சேராமை ciṟṟiṉañcērāmai): 451–460
- Chapter 47. Acting after due Consideration (தெரிந்து செயல்வகை terintuceyalvakai): 461–470
- Chapter 48. The Knowledge of Power (வலியறிதல் valiyaṟital): 471–480
- Chapter 49. Knowledge of Apt Timing (காலமறிதல் kālamaṟital): 481–490
- Chapter 50. Knowledge of Location (இடனறிதல் iṭaṉaṟital): 491–500
- Chapter 51. Selection and Confidence (தெரிந்து தெளிதல் terintuteḷital): 501–510
- Chapter 52. Selection and Employment (தெரிந்து வினையாடல் terintuviṉaiyāṭal): 511–520
- Chapter 53. Cherishing One's Kindred (சுற்றந்தழால் cuṟṟantaḻāl): 521–530
- Chapter 54. Unforgetfulness (பொச்சாவாமை poccāvāmai): 531–540
- Chapter 55. The Right Sceptre (செங்கோன்மை ceṅkōṉmai): 541–550
- Chapter 56. The Cruel Sceptre (கொடுங்கோன்மை koṭuṅkōṉmai): 551–560
- Chapter 57. Absence of Terrorism (வெருவந்த செய்யாமை veruvantaceyyāmai): 561–570
- Chapter 58. Benignity (கண்ணோட்டம் kaṇṇōṭṭam): 571–580
- Chapter 59. Detectives (ஒற்றாடல் oṟṟāṭal): 581–590
- Chapter 60. Energetics (ஊக்கமுடைமை ūkkamuṭaimai): 591–600
- Chapter 61. Unsluggishness (மடியின்மை maṭiyiṉmai): 601–610
- Chapter 62. Manly Effort (ஆள்வினையுடைமை āḷviṉaiyuṭaimai): 611–620
- Chapter 63. Hopefulness in Trouble (இடுக்கண் அழியாமை iṭukkaṇ aḻiyāmai): 621–630
- Chapter 64. Ministry of State (அமைச்சு amaiccu): 631–640
- Chapter 65. Oratory (சொல்வன்மை colvaṉmai): 641–650
- Chapter 66. Purity in Execution (வினைத்தூய்மை viṉaittūymai): 651–660
- Chapter 67. Power in Execution (வினைத்திட்பம் viṉaittiṭpam): 661–670
- Chapter 68. The Method of Execution (வினை செயல்வகை viṉaiceyalvakai): 671–680
- Chapter 69. The Envoy (தூது tūtu): 681–690
- Chapter 70. Conduct in the Presence of the King (மன்னரைச் சேர்ந்தொழுதல் maṉṉaraic cērntoḻutal): 691–700
- Chapter 71. The Knowledge of Signals (குறிப்பறிதல் kuṟippaṟital): 701–710
- Chapter 72. The Knowledge of the Council Chamber (அவையறிதல் avaiyaṟital): 711–720
- Chapter 73. Dread avoidance (அவையஞ்சாமை avaiyañcāmai): 721–730
- Chapter 74. The Land (நாடு nāṭu): 731–740
- Chapter 75. The Fortification (அரண் araṇ): 741–750
- Chapter 76. Wealth Accumulation (பொருள் செயல்வகை poruḷceyalvakai): 751–760
- Chapter 77. The Excellence of an Army (படைமாட்சி paṭaimāṭci): 761–770
- Chapter 78. Military Spirit (படைச்செருக்கு paṭaiccerukku): 771–780
- Chapter 79. Friendship (நட்பு naṭpu): 781–790
- Chapter 80. Investigation in Forming Friendships (நட்பாராய்தல் naṭpārāytal): 791–800
- Chapter 81. Familiarity (பழைமை paḻaimai): 801–810
- Chapter 82. Evil Friendship (தீ நட்பு tī naṭpu): 811–820
- Chapter 83. Unreal Friendship (கூடா நட்பு kūṭānaṭpu): 821–830
- Chapter 84. Folly (பேதைமை pētaimai): 831–840
- Chapter 85. Ignorance (புல்லறிவாண்மை pullaṟivāṇmai): 841–850
- Chapter 86. Hostility (இகல் ikal): 851–860
- Chapter 87. The Might of Hatred (பகை மாட்சி pakaimāṭci): 861–870
- Chapter 88. Recognizing the Quality of Enmity (பகைத்திறந்தெரிதல் pakaittiṟanterital): 871–880
- Chapter 89. Internal Enmity (உட்பகை uṭpakai): 881–890
- Chapter 90. Not Offending the Great (பெரியாரைப் பிழையாமை periyāraip piḻaiyāmai): 891–900
- Chapter 91. Being led by Women (பெண்வழிச் சேறல் peṇvaḻiccēṟal): 901–910
- Chapter 92. Wanton Women (வரைவின் மகளிர் varaiviṉmakaḷir): 911–920
- Chapter 93. Abstinence from Liquor (கள்ளுண்ணாமை kaḷḷuṇṇāmai): 921–930
- Chapter 94. Gaming (Gambling) (சூது cūtu): 931–940
- Chapter 95. Medicine (மருந்து maruntu): 941–950
- Chapter 96. Lineage (குடிமை kuṭimai): 951–960
- Chapter 97. Honour (மானம் māṉam): 961–970
- Chapter 98. Greatness (பெருமை perumai): 971–980
- Chapter 99. Perfectness (சான்றாண்மை cāṉṟāṇmai): 981–990
- Chapter 100. Courtesy (பண்புடைமை paṇpuṭaimai): 991–1000
- Chapter 101. Wealth without Benefaction (நன்றியில் செல்வம் naṉṟiyilcelvam): 1001–1010
- Chapter 102. Shame (நாணுடைமை nāṇuṭaimai): 1011–1020
- Chapter 103. Family Maintenance (குடிசெயல்வகை kuṭiceyalvakai): 1021–1030
- Chapter 104. Agriculture (உழவு uḻavu): 1031–1040
- Chapter 105. Poverty (நல்குரவு nalkuravu): 1041–1050
- Chapter 106. Mendicancy (இரவு iravu): 1051–1060
- Chapter 107. The Dread of Mendicancy (இரவச்சம் iravaccam): 1061–1070
- Chapter 108. Baseness (கயமை kayamai): 1071–1080

In the Book of Poruḷ, the Kural literature appears not only as a book of lofty wisdom, but also as a book of "shrewd cunning," according to Zvelebil, still keeping the moral very empirical and pragmatic as with the rest of the work. The book is less virtuous than the Book of Aram and more diplomatic since it deals with various people in the society. Morals are presented only incidentally and sporadically except in the appendix consisting of the final 13 chapters.

The initial chapters on royalty define the ideal sovereign, such as being well informed; keeping befitting company; not letting opportunities slide; using discretion in the choice of civil and military servants; holding a benign sceptre of gold firm yet popular, rather than of iron; and being ever active without any despair in affliction. The chapters on ministers of state deal with the qualifications of ministers, their conduct in the royal court, and their diplomacy. The chapters on the essentials of the state deal with the necessaries of a kingdom, handling international relationships, and virtuous tactics of warfare. There are also chapters that forbid evil conducts such as uxoriousness, harlotry, intoxication and gambling and a chapter on healthy living. The "appendix" chapters deal with both affirmative morality, such as honour, greatness, perfection, courtesy and self-reprobation, and negative morality, such as dread of poverty, mendicancy, dread of mendicancy and vileness.

== Structural plan of the book ==
The Kural literature has a very distinct and a well-thought-out structural plan, giving the Kural couplets two different meaning, namely, a structural meaning (when read in relation to the whole) and a proverbial meaning (when read in isolation). This is more pronounced in the Book of Poruḷ, where the couplets, when read in relation to the whole, reveal that the Kural's ethics is entirely different from that of Chanakya or Machiavelli. The very order of the Book of Poruḷ within the Kural literature indicates that the public life of a person, which the Book of Poruḷ expounds, is discussed only after his or her inner, moral growth has been ensured by the Book of Aṟam preceding it. In short, the entire structural meaning of the Book of Poruḷ emphasizes that only a cultured, civilized man, who is morally and spiritually ripe, is fit to enter public or political life.

== Comparison with other ancient texts ==
The statecraft dealt with in the Book of Poruḷ has semblance with several ancient texts in the pan-Indian expanse such as the Manusmriti, Kautilya's Arthashastra, and Kamandaka's Nitisara, to name a few. The codes of kingship, diplomacy, and citizenship found in the Book of Poruḷ share a common ground with these texts. However, the Book of Poruḷ remains unique in its attitudes and approaches. For example, as against the subtle statecraft found in Arthashastra, the ideas of governance and polity found in the Book of Poruḷ are based on a "moralistic and benevolent bedrock". By opposing Manusmriti's social order given in the form of a complex web of hierarchies and discriminations, the Book of Poruḷ suggests human brotherhood and oneness of humanity.

=== Comparison with the Arthashastra ===
Despite several scholars trying to draw parallels between the economic concepts of Kautilya found in Arthashastra and those found in the Book of Porul, there seems to be no resemblance between the two. While Valluvar gives primary importance to agriculture in the Book of Porul, this is not the case in Arthashastra. While Kautilya suggests various taxes to raise the revenue of a government, including by means of intimidation and persuasion, Valluvar does not entertain this. Rather, he believes in taxation by consent. Kautilya's economic system is primarily based on caste, which is virtually absent in Valluvar's thought. Valluvar's economic system, on the other hand, is based on ethical principles, which are not found in the Arthashastra. While Kautilya allows exploiting the gullibility and religious beliefs of the subject, and even gambling, drinking and prostitution, as means to enriching the state's coffers, Valluvar denounces these as sins. While Kautilya writes about arts and artists, Valluvar strangely doesn’t touch upon the subject of arts and performance arts anywhere in the Kural text.

== Translations ==
The Book of Porul is the second most translated book of the Kural literature after the Book of Aram, and most of the translators of the Kural text have translated the Book of Porul. Some of the earliest translations include those by Father Beschi, Karl Graul, and E. S. Ariel. Beschi translated the book into Latin as "rerum proprietates". Graul translated it into Latin and German as "de bonis" and "vom Gute," respectively. Ariel translated it into French as "la fortune."

== Influence ==
According to T. N. Hajela, Valluvar's thoughts on agriculture found in the Book of Poruḷ have influenced the Chola emperor Karikala of the 1st century CE to undertake massive developmental measures for land reclamation, colonisation, construction of dams, and other agrarian reforms.

== See also ==
- Aram (Kural book)
- Inbam (Kural book)

== Notes ==
a. These various meanings of poruḷ come from couplets 63, 128, 141, 176, 178, 199, 371, 212, 247, 254, 307, 351, 423, 462, 583, 741, and 1046 of the Tirukkural.

b. The idea that poruḷ means the "ultimate reality" comes from couplets 141 and 501 of the Tirukkural.

== Citations ==
=== Primary sources (Tamil) ===
- Alathur Kilar, Kḻuvāi Illai!, புறநானூறு [Puranānuru] (Verse 34), See original text in Tamil Virtual University.
- Avvaiyar. ta:திருவள்ளுவமாலை . Tirutthanigai Saravanaperumal Aiyar (commentator) – via Wikisource.
- Ilango Adigal, சிலப்பதிகாரம் [Silappathigāram], See original text in Tamil Virtual University.
- Kambar, கம்பராமாயணம் [Kambarāmāyanam], See original text in Tamil Virtual University.
- Manakkudavar (2003). திருக்குறள் மணக்குடவர் உரை. C. Meiyyappan (Ed.). Chennai: Manivasagar Padhippagam. 370 pp.
- Parimelalhagar (2009). திருக்குறள் மூலமும் பரிமேலழகர் உரையும். Compiled by V. M. Gopalakrishnamachariyar. Chennai: Uma Padhippagam. 1456 pp.
- Seethalai Sāthanār, மணிமேகலை [Manimekalai], See original text in Tamil Virtual University.
- Sekkiḻar, பெரிய‌ புராண‌ம் [Periya Puranam], See original text in Tamil Virtual University.
- Valluvar. ta:திருக்குறள் . Translated by George Uglow Pope – via Wikisource. See original text in Project Madurai.

=== Secondary sources ===
- M. V. Aravindan (2018). உரையாசிரியர்கள் [Commentators]. Chennai: Manivasagar Padhippagam.
- K. V. Balasubramanian (2016). திருக்குறள் பேரொளி [Tirukkural beacon] (1 ed.). Chennai: New Century Book House. ISBN 978-81-2343-061-4.
- Encyclopædia Britannica (1992). "Artha" in Encyclopædia Britannica. Vol. 1 (15th ed.). Chicago: Encyclopaedia Britannica.
- Gavin Flood (1996). The meaning and context of the Purusarthas, in Julius Lipner (Ed.), The Fruits of Our Desiring. ISBN 978-1-896209-30-2.
- T. N. Hajela (2008). History of Economic Thought (First edition 1967). Ane's Student Edition (17th ed.). New Delhi: Ane Books. ISBN 978-81-8052-220-8.
- Constance Jones and James Ryan (2007). Encyclopedia of Hinduism. ISBN 978-0-8160-5458-9.
- Daya Krishna (2000). The myth of the purusarthas. In Roy Perrett (Ed.), Theory of Value. Vol. 5. Taylor & Francis. ISBN 0-8153-3612-8.
- R. Kumaravelan, ed. (2008). திருக்குறள் வ.உ.சிதம்பரனார் உரை [Tirukkural: V. O. Chidhambaram Commentary] (in Tamil) (1st ed.). Chennai: Pari Nilayam.
- S. N. Kandasamy (2020). திருக்குறள்: ஆய்வுத் தெளிவுரை (பெருட்பால், பகுதி 1) [Tirukkural: Research commentary: Book of Porul, Part 1]. Chennai: Manivasagar Padhippagam.
- Srinivasachari, C. S. (1949). "The Political Ideology of the Kural". The Indian Journal of Political Science. 10 (4): 15–23.
- James Lochtefeld (2002). The Illustrated Encyclopedia of Hinduism. New York: Rosen Publishing. ISBN 0-8239-2287-1.
- Mohan Lal (1992). Encyclopaedia of Indian Literature: Sasay to Zorgot. New Delhi: Sahitya Akademi. ISBN 978-81-260-1221-3.
- Kaushik Roy (2012). Hinduism and the Ethics of Warfare in South Asia: From Antiquity to the Present. Cambridge University Press. ISBN 978-1-107-01736-8.
- K.V. Nagarajan (2005). "Thiruvalluvar's Vision: Polity and Economy in Thirukkural". History of Political Economy. 37 (1). Duke University Press: 123–132. doi:10.1215/00182702-37-1-123.
- A. K. Ananthanathan (1994). "Theory and Functions of the State The Concept of aṟam (virtue) in Tirukkural". East and West. 44 (2/4): 315–326. JSTOR 29757156.
- Das, G. N. (1997). Readings from Thirukkural. Abhinav Publications. ISBN 8-1701-7342-6.
- Subramaniam, V. (1963). "A Tamil classic on statecraft". Australian Outlook. 17 (2). Taylor & Francis: 162–174. doi:10.1080/10357716308444141. ISSN 0004-9913.
- P. Sensarma (1981). Military Thoughts of Tiruvaḷḷuvar. Calcutta: Darbari Udjog. pp. 40–42.
- A. A. Manavalan (2009). Essays and Tributes on Tirukkural (1886–1986 AD) (1 ed.). Chennai: International Institute of Tamil Studies.
- A. A. Manavalan (2010). A Compendium of Tirukkural Translations in English (4 vols.). Chennai: Central Institute of Classical Tamil. ISBN 978-81-90800-02-0.
- Sujit Mukherjee (1999). A Dictionary of Indian Literature: One: Beginnings–1850. Vol. 1 (1st ed.). Hyderabad: Orient Longman. ISBN 81-250-1453-5.
- Karl H. Potter (2002). Presuppositions of India's Philosophies. Motilal Banarsidass. ISBN 978-81-208-0779-2.
- M. P. Sivagnanam (1974). திருக்குறளிலே கலைபற்றிக் கூறாததேன்? [Why the Kural did not touch upon art?]. Chennai: Poonkodi Padhippagam.
- Vanmeegar (2012). Thirukkural: Couplets with English Transliteration and Meaning (1st ed.). Chennai: Shree Shenbaga Pathippagam.
- Bruce Sullivan (1997). Historical Dictionary of Hinduism. Lanham, MD: Scarecrow Press. ISBN 978-0-8108-3327-2.
- Kamil Zvelebil (1973). The Smile of Murugan: On Tamil Literature of South India. Leiden: E. J. Brill. p. 155. ISBN 90-04-03591-5.
