= Kaalingar =

Medieval Indian literary scholar of the Tamil language

Kaalingar (c. 12th century CE), also known as Kalingarayar, was a Tamil scholar and commentator known for his commentary on the Thirukkural. He was among the canon of Ten Medieval Commentators of the Kural text highly esteemed by scholars. He was also among the five ancient commentators whose commentaries had been preserved and made available to the Modern era, the others being Manakkudavar, Pari Perumal, Paridhi, and Parimelalhagar.

== Early life ==
Kaalingar was born in Kaalingarayar tribe around the end of 12th century CE and was a farmer, soldier, and a physician. His commentary to the Kural chapter on fortification (Chapter 75) and other war-related chapters are rife with information about battlefield, which hints his military background. It is also believed that he might have migrated from the Kalinga country and hence known by the name. He is believed to have lived around the 12th century CE. Kaalingar had great respect for Valluvar and referred to him as "Lord Valluvar" in his work. He is believed to have published his commentary around 1225 CE.

Similar to the commentaries by Paridhiyar, Pariperumal, and Mallar, Kaalingar's commentary is believed to have been originated in the Kongu Region.

== Religion ==
Kaalingar is believed to have been a follower of Jainism. This is evident by his explanations given to Kural couplets 377 and 580.

== Commentary on the Kural text ==
Kaalingar's commentary on the Kural text is believed to have been considered the greatest commentary before the appearance of Parimelalhagar’s work. He quotes several older works in his commentary, which serves as a proof to his erudition. Kaalingar's commentary is known for its grammatically pure writing and usage of High Tamil vocabulary that appealed to the reader. The commentary is devoid of complex phraseology or intricate meanings. He provides the lexical meaning of terms wherever necessary. Unlike Manakkudavar and Pari Perumal, Kaalingar has followed the Tiruvalluva Maalai for subdividing the Kural books of Aram, Porul, and Inbam. At the end of each chapter, he introduces and connects the theme of the chapter that follows. However, he refrains from describing the meaning of the title of chapters.

In his commentary, Kaalingar, like the other Medieval commentators, makes several changes to the chapter arrangements and the order of Kural couplets within each chapter. He gives the justification for his arrangement of the Kural chapters at the end of each chapter. For example, in Book III of the Kural (the Book of Love), Kaalingar's arrangement varies in three places. He makes several comparisons between various Kural couplets in numerous places throughout his work. He gives an altogether new meaning and explanation for couplets 510, 517, 593, 614, and 1050. His commentary is similar to Paridhi's in couplets 161, 163, 167, and 1313. In Book III, his commentary resembles Pariperumal's in a couple of places. He also quotes from other classics such as the Naladiyar, Purananuru, Jivaka Chinthamani, and Tolkappiyam.

In several places, Kaalingar's commentary appears like a teacher's elaborative reply to his or her student's questions. R. Mohan and Nellai N. Sokkalingam attribute this to the era in which Kaalingar's commentary appeared in the Tamil literary tradition. According to them, when commentaries first began to appear in the Tamil literary world, they appeared predominantly in the contemporary spoken dialect, often resembling the conversations between a preceptor and a disciple since most of the commentators who wrote the earliest commentaries, including Kaalingar, were scholars who taught students on those subjects.

One of the characteristic features of Kaalingar's commentary is an abstract of the forthcoming chapter found in every chapter usually at the end of the chapter, after the final verse. Parimelalhagar adopts this method in his commentary and writes the abstract of the respective chapter at the beginning of each chapter. Kaalingar also explains difficult terms used by Valluvar by giving their meanings wherever necessary. In all, he lists the meaning of 241 terms used by Valluvar, including 54 in Book I, 175 in Book II, and 12 in Book III. This way, he explains 166 couplets, including 36 in Book I, 118 in Book II, and 12 in Book III.

The titles of Chapters 110, 111, 118, and 127, all in Book III, appear with slight variations in Kaalingar's commentary from that of Parimelalhagar's. Couplets 1198 and 1210, both in Book III, are kept in different chapters within the book in Kaalingar's commentary.

== Variations in ordering of the Kural verses ==
The following table depicts the variations among the early commentators' ordering of, for example, the first ten verses of the Tirukkural. Note that the ordering of the verses and chapters as set by Parimelalhagar, which had been followed unanimously for centuries ever since, has now been accepted as the standard structure of the Kural text.

Kural verse beginning	Couplet ordering				
Kural verse beginning	Manakkudavar's	Pari Perumal's	Paridhi's	Kaalingar's	Parimelalhagar's
Kural 1: அகர முதல எழுத்தெல்லாம்	1	1	1	1	1
Kural 2: கற்றதனால் ஆய பயன்	2	2	2	2	2
Kural 3: மலர்மிசை ஏகினான் மாணடி	3	3	3	3	3
Kural 4: வேண்டுதல் வேண்டாமை இலான்	6	6	5	7	4
Kural 5: இருள்சேர் இருவினையும் சேரா	7	7	6	6	5
Kural 6: பொறிவாயில் ஐந்தவித்தான்	8	8	7	7	6
Kural 7: தனக்கு உவமை இல்லாதான்	4	4	6	4	7
Kural 8: அற ஆழி அந்தணன்	5	5	10	9	8
Kural 9: கோளில் பொறியில் குணமிலவே	10	10	8	5	9
Kural 10: பிறவிப் பெருங்கடல் நீந்துவர்	9	9	9	10	10

It is found that there are as many as 171 variations found in the ordering of the Kural couplets by Kaalingar with respect to the commentary by Manakkudavar.

== Publication ==
The palm-leaf manuscript containing Kaalingar's commentary was first published independently by both Thiruvenkatavan University and T. P. Palaniyappa Pillai in 1945. Pillai obtained a copy of the manuscript then found at Annamalai University library.

== See also ==
- Ten Medieval Commentators
- Bhashya
- Commentaries in Tamil literary tradition
