= Inbam (Kural book) =

The Book of Inbam, originally Kāmattuppāl (Tamil: காமத்துப்பால்), or in a more tamilized form Iṉbattuppāl (Tamil: இன்பத்துப்பால், literally, "division of love"), also known as the Book of Love, the Third Book or Book Three in translated versions, is the third of the three books or parts of the Kural literature, authored by the ancient Indian philosopher Valluvar. Written in High Tamil distich form, it has 25 chapters each containing 10 kurals or couplets, making a total of 250 couplets all dealing with human love. The term inbam or kamam, which means 'pleasure', correlates with the third of the four ancient Indian values of dharma, artha, kama and moksha. However, unlike Kamasutra, which deals with different methods of sex, the Book of Inbam expounds the virtues and emotions involved in conjugal love between a man and a woman, or virtues of an individual within the walls of intimacy, keeping aṟam or dharma as the base.

== Etymology and meanings ==
Inbam is the Tamil word that corresponds to the Sanskrit term 'kama', and pāl refers to 'division'. It is one of the four mutually non-exclusive aims of human life in the Indian philosophy called the Puruṣārthas, the other three being aṟam (dharma), poruḷ (artha), and veedu (moksha). The concept of inbam is found in some of the earliest known verses in the Vedas, Upanishads, and epics such as the Mahabaratha. Although inbam sometimes connotes sexual desire and longing in contemporary literature, the concept more broadly refers to any desire, wish, passion, longing, pleasure of the senses, the aesthetic enjoyment of life, affection, or love, with or without sexual connotations. The term also refers to any sensory enjoyment, emotional attraction and aesthetic pleasure such as from arts, dance, music, painting, sculpture and nature. Inbam in its sanskritized form kama is common to all Indian languages.

Inbam is considered an essential and healthy goal of human life when pursued without sacrificing the other three goals of aram or dharma (virtuous, proper, moral life), poruḷ or artha (material prosperity, income security, means of life) and veedu or moksha (liberation, release, self-actualization).

In spite of the Tamil term inbam referring to pleasure, Valluvar preferred to call the book Kāmattuppāl rather than Inbattuppāl in line with the trivarga of the Puruṣārtha.

== The book and its chapters ==
The Book of Inbam talks about the emotions gone through by a man and a woman when they fall in love with each other. It covers the emotions of love both in the pre-marital and the post-marital states. With 25 chapters, the Book of Inbam is the smallest of the three books of the Kural text.

Outline of the Book of Inbam

Book Three—Book of Love (25 chapters)

- Chapter 109. Mental Disturbance Caused by the Beauty of the Princess (தகையணங்குறுத்தல் takaiyaṇaṅkuṟuttal): 1081–1090
- Chapter 110. Recognition of the Signs (of Mutual Love) (குறிப்பறிதல் kuṟippaṟital): 1091–1100
- Chapter 111. Delight in Coition (புணர்ச்சி மகிழ்தல் puṇarccimakiḻtal): 1101–1110
- Chapter 112. The Praise of Her Beauty (நலம் புனைந்துரைத்தல் nalampuṉainturaittal): 1111–1120
- Chapter 113. Declaration of Love's Special Excellence (காதற் சிறப்புரைத்தல் kātaṟciṟappuraittal): 1121–1130
- Chapter 114. The Abandonment of Reserve (நாணுத் துறவுரைத்தல் nāṇuttuṟavuraittal): 1131–1140
- Chapter 115. The Announcement of the Rumour (அலரறிவுறுத்தல் alaraṟivuṟuttal): 1141–1150
- Chapter 116. Unendurable Separation (பிரிவாற்றாமை pirivāṟṟāmai): 1151–1160
- Chapter 117. Complaint (படர் மெலிந்திரங்கல் paṭarmelintiraṅkal): 1161–1170
- Chapter 118. Eyes Consumed with Grief (கண்விதுப்பழிதல் kaṇvituppaḻital): 1171–1180
- Chapter 119. The Pallid Hue (பசப்பறு பருவரல் pacappaṟuparuvaral): 1181–1190
- Chapter 120. The Solitary Anguish (தனிப்படர் மிகுதி taṉippaṭarmikuti): 1191–1200
- Chapter 121. Sad Memories (நினைந்தவர் புலம்பல் niṉaintavarpulampal): 1201–1210
- Chapter 122. The Visions of the Night (கனவுநிலையுரைத்தல் kaṉavunilaiyuraittal): 1211–1220
- Chapter 123. Lamentations at Even-tide (பொழுதுகண்டிரங்கல் poḻutukaṇṭiraṅkal): 1221–1230
- Chapter 124. Wasting Away (உறுப்பு நலனழிதல் uṟuppunalaṉaḻital): 1231–1240
- Chapter 125. Soliloquy (நெஞ்சொடு கிளத்தல் neñcoṭukiḷattal): 1241–1250
- Chapter 126. Reserve Overcome (நிறையழிதல் niṟaiyaḻital): 1251–1260
- Chapter 127. Mutual Desire (அவர்வயின் விதும்பல் avarvayiṉvitumpal): 1261–1270
- Chapter 128. The Reading of the Signs (குறிப்பறிவுறுத்தல் kuṟippaṟivuṟuttal): 1271–1280
- Chapter 129. Desire for Reunion (புணர்ச்சி விதும்பல் puṇarccivitumpal): 1281–1290
- Chapter 130. Expostulation with Oneself (நெஞ்சொடு புலத்தல் neñcoṭupulattal): 1291–1300
- Chapter 131. Pouting (புலவி pulavi): 1301–1310
- Chapter 132. Feigned Anger (புலவி நுணுக்கம் pulavi nuṇukkam): 1311–1320
- Chapter 133. The Pleasures of 'Temporary Variance' (ஊடலுவகை ūṭaluvakai): 1321–1330

As with Books I and II of the Kural text, the author did not group the chapters under any subdivisions. However, the ten medieval commentators, who were the first to write commentaries about the Tirukkural, divided the Book of Inbam variously between two and three portions. For example, while Parimelalhagar's division consists of two parts, other medieval scholiasts have divided the Book of Inbam into three portions. Parimelalhagar's two-part division includes Kalavu and Karpu. However, Manakkudavar goes to the extent of dividing the book into five: Kurinji, Mullai, Marudham, Neidhal, and Paalai, in accord with the Sangam practice that divides the land into said five divisions. Kaalingar and Mosikeeranar divide Book III into three parts: masculine sayings (Chapters 109 to 115), feminine sayings (Chapters 116 to 127), and common sayings (which includes both masculine and feminine sayings; Chapters 128 to 133). While some of the medieval commentators consider couplets 6, 7, 9, and 10 of Chapter 115 as feminine sayings, Kaalingar considers these as masculine ones and goes on to elaborate accordingly. Pari Perumal divides Book III into three, likening it to the Kamasutra text. However, modern scholars such as M. V. Aravindan oppose this idea of comparing Kural's Book III with Kamasutra.

== Poetic aspects ==
The Book of Inbam follows the earlier bardic agam genre of the Tamil literary tradition, wherein the human emotional states and attitudes are classified with natural features of the Tamil regions—a unique feature of the Sangam poetry derived from the Tolkappiyam—wherein the five Tamil landscapes, known as tinai, are compared to the human states of emotions:

- Kurinchi (mountain): Unification of lovers
- Palai (arid terrain): Separation
- Mullai (pastoral tracts): Patient waiting
- Neythal (seashore): Pining
- Marutham (riverine tracts): Sulking

It is generally accepted by scholars that of all the three books of the Kural, the Book of Inbam is where the poetic genius of Valluvar attains its greatest height. This is possibly because the traditions of early classical literature of the Sangam poetry continue to remain strong in the domain of "pleasure." Unlike in the two other books of the Kural text, in the Book of Inbam Valluvar falls in line with the established poetic tradition of the Sangam love anthologies in terms of style, diction, and structural unity. According to T. P. Meenakshisundaram, every couplet of the Book of Inbam may be considered a "dramatic monologue of the agam variety." According to Czech Indologist Kamil Zvelebil, true poetry in the Tirukkural appears in the Book of Inbam, where "the teacher, the preacher in Valluvar has stepped aside, and Valluvar speaks here almost the language of the superb love-poetry of the classical age":

"Shall I draw back, or yield myself, or shall both mingled be,
When he returns, my spouse, dear as these eyes to me." (Kural 1267)

"Withdraw, it burns; approach, it soothes the pain;
Whence did the maid this wondrous fire obtain?" (Kural 1104)

"A double witchery have glances of her liquid eyes;
One glance is glance that brings me pain; the other heals again." (Kural 1091)

In the words of Pattu M. Bhoopathi, "[i]t is not the word, or the phrase or the meter that essentially contributes to the grandeur of the presentation of the situational sequence but the echoed voice, the mood and the articulation that suggestively individuates the situational element of the love or the lover in each of the couplets." He further states, "Here in Kamattupal Valluvar intuitively anticipates much earlier in time the Keats' concept of 'A thing of beauty is a joy for ever'."

== Comparison with other ancient texts ==
The subject of pleasure that the Book of Inbam deals with is often compared by scholars chiefly with the Kamasutra. However, the Kural's approach of the subject differs entirely from the Kamasutra, which is all about eros and techniques of sexual fulfillment. With a virtuous attitude, the Book of Inbam remains unique as a poetic appreciation of flowering human love as explicated by the Sangam period's concept of intimacy, known as agam in the Tamil literary tradition. In the words of Zvelebil, while Kamasutra and all later Sanskrit erotology are sastras, that is, objective and scientific analyses of sex, the Book of Inbam is "a poetic picture of eros, of ideal love, of its dramatic situations."

The Kural differs from every other work in that it follows ethics, surprisingly a divine one, even in its Book of Love. According to Albert Schweitzer, while the laws of Manu still just tolerates world and life affirmation alongside their negation, the Kural treats world and life negation "only like a distant cloud in the sky," which is evident in the Book of Inbam where earthly love is lauded. According to Gopalkrishna Gandhi, the Book of Inbam helps date the Kural literature since it "describes the hero as a one-woman man and concubines are absent. This is in conformity with Valluvar's views on personal morality."

While the work of Confucius shares many of its philosophies with the first two books of the Kural text, the subject of conjugal love expounded by the Book of Inbam is entirely absent in the work of Confucius.

== Translations ==
Of the three books of the Kural, the Book of Inbam has the fewest translations available. The chief reason behind this was that many translators, particularly non-Indian translators, had long mistook the content of the book for something similar to Vatsyayana's Kamasutra and considered it inappropriate to translate after studying the two previous Kural books on virtue and polity. Many of the early European translators, including Constantius Joseph Beschi, Francis Whyte Ellis, William Henry Drew, and Edward Jewitt Robinson had this misconception. For instance, Drew remarked, "The third part could not be read with impunity by the purest mind, nor translated into any European language without exposing the translator of it to infamy." Later Western translators such as Satguru Sivaya Subramuniya Swami, too, avoided translating Book Three of the Kural.

Nevertheless, several later scholars of the nineteenth century realized that the Book of Inbam is only a poetic expression of the emotions involved in conjugal human love and started translating it too. For example, Pandurang Sadashiv Sane, a twentieth-century Marathi translator of the Kural, said, "The translation of this book is available in Hindi with the name of 'Tamil Veda', but it includes only two sections: 'Dharma' (Arattuppal) and 'Artha' (Porutpal). The third section discussing 'Kama' (Kamattuppal) has been dropped. Actually in this section there is nothing which can be said to be obscene or vulgar. It is a very fine section. I have translated that section in full."

In 2019, an exclusive English translation of the Book of Inbam in modern verse was made by Pattu M. Bhoopathi. In 2023, Meena Kandasamy translated the Book of Inbam into English from a feminist's perspective under the title The Book of Desire, claiming it "the only thing you can actually read to your lover in bed" and calling the Kural text "the heartbeat of Tamil civilization."

== In arts ==
Mayilai Srini Govindarasanar, a Tamil scholar, adopted the Book of Inbam as a theatrical drama titled Kamathupaal Naadagam (literally "the drama of Kamathupaal").

== See also ==
- Aram (Kural book)
- Porul (Kural book)

== Citations ==
=== Primary sources (Tamil) ===
- Alathur Kilar, Kḻuvāi Illai!, புறநானூறு [Puranānuru] (Verse 34), See original text in Tamil Virtual University.
- Avvaiyar. ta:திருவள்ளுவமாலை . Tirutthanigai Saravanaperumal Aiyar (commentator) – via Wikisource.
- Ilango Adigal, சிலப்பதிகாரம் [Silappathigāram], See original text in Tamil Virtual University.
- Kambar, கம்பராமாயணம் [Kambarāmāyanam], See original text in Tamil Virtual University.
- Manakkudavar (2003). திருக்குறள் மணக்குடவர் உரை. C. Meiyyappan (Ed.). Chennai: Manivasagar Padhippagam. 370 pp.
- Parimelalhagar (2009). திருக்குறள் மூலமும் பரிமேலழகர் உரையும். Compiled by V. M. Gopalakrishnamachariyar. Chennai: Uma Padhippagam. 1456 pp.
- Seethalai Sāthanār, மணிமேகலை [Manimekalai], See original text in Tamil Virtual University.
- Sekkiḻar, பெரிய‌ புராண‌ம் [Periya Puranam], See original text in Tamil Virtual University.
- Valluvar. ta:திருக்குறள் . Translated by George Uglow Pope – via Wikisource. See original text in Project Madurai.

=== Secondary sources ===
- Anonymous (1999). Confucius: A Biography (Trans. Lun Yu, in English). Confucius Publishing Co. Ltd.
- G. P. Chellammal (2015). திருக்குறள் ஆய்வுக் கோவை [Tirukkural Research Compendium] (in Tamil) (1 ed.). Chennai: Manivasagar Padhippagam.
- Encyclopædia Britannica (1992). "Kama" in Encyclopædia Britannica. Vol. 1 (15th ed.). Chicago: Encyclopaedia Britannica.
- A. A. Manavalan (2009). Essays and Tributes on Tirukkural (1886–1986 AD). Chennai: International Institute of Tamil Studies.
- A. A. Manavalan (2010). A Compendium of Tirukkural Translations in English (4 vols.). Chennai: Central Institute of Classical Tamil. ISBN 978-81-90800-02-0.
- Kamil Zvelebil (1973). The Smile of Murugan: On Tamil Literature of South India. Leiden: E. J. Brill. ISBN 90-04-03591-5.
- Sane Guruji (1960). Kural, Teen (Three) Purushartha (in Marathi) (2nd ed.). Poona: Continental Prakashan.
- S. Krishnamoorthy (2004). இக்கால உலகிற்குத் திருக்குறள் [Tirukkural for Contemporary World] (Volume 3) (in Tamil) (First ed.). Chennai: International Institute of Tamil Studies.
- R. Kumaravelan, ed. (2008). திருக்குறள் வ.உ.சிதம்பரனார் உரை [Tirukkural: V. O. Chidhambaram Commentary] (in Tamil) (1st ed.). Chennai: Pari Nilayam.
- Mohan Lal (1992). Encyclopaedia of Indian Literature: Sasay to Zorgot. Vol. V. New Delhi: Sahitya Akademi. ISBN 978-81-260-1221-3.
- Subramuniyaswami, Sivaya (1979). "Thirukural" (PDF). Archived from the original (PDF) on 23 November 2015.
- James Lochtefeld (2002). The Illustrated Encyclopedia of Hinduism. Vol. 1. New York: Rosen Publishing. ISBN 0-8239-2287-1.
- Sujit Mukherjee (1999). A Dictionary of Indian Literature: One: Beginnings–1850. Vol. 1 (1st ed.). Hyderabad: Orient Longman. ISBN 81-250-1453-5.
- R. Prasad (2008). History of Science, Philosophy and Culture in Indian Civilization, Volume 12, Part 1. ISBN 978-8180695445.
- Edward Jewitt Robinson (2001). Tamil Wisdom: Traditions Concerning Hindu Sages and Selections from Their Writings. New Delhi: Asian Educational Services.
- Gautam, Pradeep Kumar (March 2021). A Study of the Kural: Concepts and Themes. MP-IDSA Monograph Series. Vol. 70. New Delhi: Manohar Parrikar Institute for Defence Studies and Analyses. ISBN 978-93-82169-97-0.
- N. Sanjeevi, ed. (1973). First All India Tirukkural Seminar Papers (2nd ed.). Chennai: University of Madras.
- Albert Schweitzer (2013). Indian Thoughts and Its Development. Vancouver, British Columbia, Canada: Read Books. ISBN 978-14-7338-900-7.
- M. Shanmukham Pillai (1972). திருக்குறள் அமைப்பும் முறையும் [The structure and method of Tirukkural] (1 ed.). Chennai: University of Madras.
- Vanmeegar (2012). Thirukkural: Couplets with English Transliteration and Meaning (1st ed.). Chennai: Shree Shenbaga Pathippagam.
- Pattu M. Bhoopathi (2019). Thus Blossoms Love: A transcreation of Kamattupal in modern verse. Chennai: Sandhya Publications. ISBN 978-93-87499-85-0.
- Bruce Sullivan (1997). Historical Dictionary of Hinduism. Lanham, MD: Scarecrow Press. p. 368. ISBN 978-0-8108-3327-2.
- George Uglow Pope (1886). The Sacred Kurral of Tiruvalluva Nayanar (First ed.). New Delhi: Asian Educational Services. ISBN 8120600223.
- V. Ramasamy (2001). On Translating Tirukkural (1st ed.). Chennai: International Institute of Tamil Studies.
- Parthasarathy, Indira (12 December 2015). "Couplets for modern times". The Hindu. Kasturi & Sons.
- K. V. Balasubramanian (2016). திருக்குறள் பேரொளி [Tirukkural beacon] (1 ed.). Chennai: New Century Book House. ISBN 978-81-2343-061-4.
- Iraikuruvanar (2009). திருக்குறளின் தனிச்சிறப்புகள் [Unique features of the Tirukkural] (in Tamil) (1 ed.). Chennai: Iraiyagam.
- Narang, Gaurvi (15 February 2023). "'Only thing you read to your lover in bed'—Meena Kandasamy's modern book on ancient Tamil text". The Print. New Delhi.
