= Karl Potter =

Karl Potter may refer to:

- Karl Harrington Potter, Indologist and professor of philosophy
- Karl Potter, member of the Italian rock band Banco del Mutuo Soccorso
