= Paridhi =

Medieval Indian literary scholar of the Tamil language

Paridhi (c. 11th century CE), also referred to as Paridhiyaar, was a Tamil literary commentator known for his commentary on the Thirukkural. He was among the canon of ten medieval commentators of the Kural text most highly esteemed by scholars. He was also among the five ancient commentators whose commentaries had been preserved and made available to the Modern era, the others being Manakkudavar, Pari Perumal, Kaalingar, and Parimelalhagar.

== Early life ==
Paridhi is also referred to as Parudhi in olden manuscripts. From the works of Tudisai Kilar, Paridhi's home town is known to be Tirupparudhi Niyamam, a town located near Uloor, between Thanjavur and Orathanad in the present-day Tanjavur district, where the presiding deity is Parudhiyappar (hence the name Parudhi). He belonged to the Saivite sect of the Brahmin caste. He is believed to have lived around the 11th century CE. Kalpana Sekkilar claims that Paridhi lived around early 13th century. He lived before Parimelalhagar. Paridhi had a scholarly knowledge in Sanskrit and Tamil and possessed a good worldly knowledge. He is believed to have written the commentary in his old age.

Similar to the commentaries by Kaalingar, Pariperumal, and Mallar, Paridhi's commentary is believed to have been originated in the Kongu Region.

== Religion ==
Paridhi belonged to the Saivite sect. This is evident from several usages he employed in his commentary. In the invocatory chapter of the Kural text, he explains the terms நற்றாள் (kural 2), இறைவன் பொருள்சேர் புகழ் (kural 5), and அறவாழி அந்தணன் (kural 8) as "the divine feet of Lord Shiva," "Shiva kirti," and "the virtuous ocean called Lord Parameshwara," respectively. In chapter "Not lying," he interprets the term எல்லா அறமுந் தரும் (Kural 296) as "obtaining the blessings of Lord Shiva." He employs the term "Shiva gyanam" in his explanation to kural 359. In Kural 388, he elaborates the term மக்கட்கு இறை as "Lord Parameshwara, the saviour of the world". In Kural 310, he interprets the term துறந்தார் as "those who renounced from the body the ninety-six principles." He has also explained the term எண்குணத்தான் (Kural 9) in Shivite terms.

== Commentary on the Kural text ==
Of all the ten medieval commentaries of the Kural text, Paridhi's commentary is the simplest in form and presentation. The commentary appears more or less in a colloquial style, without losing the beauty of the language and ease of comprehension. It has more Sanskrit terms compared with other medieval commentaries. In some places, it appears like a discourse in written form. Yet in some other places, the explanation is shorter than the Kural couplet upon which it elaborates. In still other places, the commentary appears long winded. According to Dhandapani Desikar, "connecting and integrating the meaning of the Kural couplets by means of Paridhi's commentary is analogous to crossing the Cauvery by means of a rope bridge."

For Kural couplets 161, 166, 167, 191, and 194, Paridhi's commentary is similar in meaning to that of Kaalingar. For couplet 1126, it strikes a similarity with that of Parimelalhagar. Paridhi employs storytelling and folklores in several places to elucidate the meaning of a given Kural couplet, as in his explanation to kural 320. In instances such as kural 58, he cites epics such as the Silappathikaram. Paridhi categorizes the chapters of Book I as Good, Moderate, and Bad, thus classifying the virtues and vices described by the Kural text in accordance with human behaviours. He uses simply language and focuses solely on getting the point across to common audience, without employing complicated grammatical constructions or showing eloquence.

== Variations in ordering of the Kural verses ==
The following table depicts the variations among the early commentators in ordering, for example, the first ten verses of the Tirukkural. Note that the ordering of the verses and chapters as set by Parimelalhagar, which had been followed unanimously for centuries ever since, has now been accepted as the standard structure of the Kural text.

Kural verse beginning	Couplet ordering				
Kural verse beginning	Manakkudavar's	Pari Perumal's	Paridhi's	Kaalingar's	Parimelalhagar's
Kural 1: அகர முதல எழுத்தெல்லாம்	1	1	1	1	1
Kural 2: கற்றதனால் ஆய பயன்	2	2	2	2	2
Kural 3: மலர்மிசை ஏகினான் மாணடி	3	3	3	3	3
Kural 4: வேண்டுதல் வேண்டாமை இலான்	6	6	5	7	4
Kural 5: இருள்சேர் இருவினையும் சேரா	7	7	6	6	5
Kural 6: பொறிவாயில் ஐந்தவித்தான்	8	8	7	7	6
Kural 7: தனக்கு உவமை இல்லாதான்	4	4	6	4	7
Kural 8: அற ஆழி அந்தணன்	5	5	10	9	8
Kural 9: கோளில் பொறியில் குணமிலவே	10	10	8	5	9
Kural 10: பிறவிப் பெருங்கடல் நீந்துவர்	9	9	9	10	10

Comparing the verse ordering by various ancient commentators with that of Manakkudavar, the first of the ancient commentators whose commentary is available, it can be reckoned that Paridhi's commentary follows closely Manakkudavar's, save for a few variations. The modern chapters 10, 13, 17, 18, and 19 appearing under the subsection "Domestic virtues" of the Kural text appear as chapters 26, 27, 30, 31, and 32, respectively, under the subsection "Ascetic virtues" in Manakkudavar's commentary. Similarly, the modern chapters 26, 29, 30, 31, 32, 33, appearing under the subsection "Ascetic virtues" appear as chapters 19, 20, 10, 16, 17, 18, respectively, under the subsection "Domestic virtues" in Manakkudavar's work. Nevertheless, being the earliest available commentary of the Tirukkural, Manakkudavar's work is considered to bear the closest semblance with the original work of the Kural text by Valluvar.

The following table shows the numbering of variations found in the ordering of the Kural verses by various ancient commentators with respect to the commentary by Manakkudavar.

Commentator	Number of variations in verse ordering
Pari Perumal	16
Paridhi	20
Kaalingar	171
Parimelalhagar	120

== Publication ==
According to M. V. Aravindan, Paridhi's commentary was first published in 1935. S. Meiyappan records that the commentary was published again in 1938 by Thudisai Kilar. C. Dandapani Desikar, who published Tirukkural Uraivalam, a compendium of early Kural commentaries including that of Paridhi, said that the palm-leaf manuscript for Paridhi's commentary was provided by V. R. Deivasikamani Goundar. In his compendium on the Kamatthuppal (Book III of the Kural text), Desikar has analyzed the history of Paridhi, Manakkudavar, Parimelalhagar, Kaalingar, and Pari Perumal and the nature of their commentaries. Paridhi's commentary is unavailable for 22 couplets. Of the available commentaries for the remaining 1308 couplets, the commentary differs from other medieval commentaries in 21 places.

== Other works ==
Following the Purushartha elements from the Indian religious schools of thoughts, Paridhi went on to write an exegesis for the Tirumurukāṟṟuppaṭai, one of the works of the Ten Idylls, after completing his Kural exegesis. Following Paridhi, Parimelalhagar and Nacchinarkkiniyar also wrote commentaries to Tirumurugarttrupadai.

== See also ==
- Ten Medieval Commentators
- Bhashya
- Commentaries in Tamil literary tradition
