= Book of Virtue =

Book of Virtue may refer to:

- Book of Aram, one of the books of the Tirukkural, a Tamil classic work of the Sangam literature
- Tao Te Ching, a Chinese classic text traditionally credited to Laozi
