= Pari Perumal =

Medieval Indian literary scholar of the Tamil language

Pari Perumal (c. 11th century CE), also known as Kaviperumal, was a Tamil scholar and commentator known for his commentary on the Thirukkural. He was among the canon of Ten Medieval Commentators of the Kural text most highly esteemed by scholars. He was also among the five ancient commentators whose commentaries had been preserved and made available to the Modern era, the others being Manakkudavar, Kaalingar, Paridhi, and Parimelalhagar.

== Biography ==
Pari Perumal hailed from Thenselhuvai in the Sethu country of the Pandya Kingdom. Scholars date his period between the second half of the 11th century and the first half of the 12th century CE since he mentioned the work Vatsyayana (whose author also lived in the 11th century CE) at the beginning of his commentary of the third book of the Tirukkural. The Thondaimandala Sathagam, which mentions the names of all the ten medieval commentators, refers to Pari Perumal as "Kavi Perumal". A verse at the end of his commentary work indicates that Pari Perumal has also authored two other books, namely, Molhiyiyal (linguistics) and Kamanul (book of pleasure). The verse also indicates that his home town is Thenselhuvai in Sethu Naadu under the Pondy zone. The Perunthogai has a few verses about Pari Perumal. The Perunthogai verse 1539 indicates there were few commentators before Pari Perumal.

Similar to the commentaries by Paridhiyar, Kaalingar, and Mallar, Pari Perumal's commentary is believed to have been originated in the Kongu Region.

== Commentary on the Kural text ==
Pari Perumal chronologically came after Manakkudavar among the medieval commentators. In writing his commentary on the Kural, he greatly followed Manakkudavar, elaborating only where necessary. There are many places where he uses Manakkudavar's commentary verbatim. It can be said that Pari Perumal revised Manakkudavar's work. The semblance of his work with that of Manakkudavar includes an introduction to all the three books of the Kural text, an explanation to each subdivision (Iyal), introduction to each chapter, and the ordering of the couplets within each chapter. Following Manakkudavar's original division, Pari Perumal also divides Book III of the Kural text into five iyals attributed to the moods of five thinais, or divisions of the Sangam landscape, namely kurinji (mountainous landscape), mullai (forest and pastoral landscape), marudam (agricultural plains and valleys), neidhal (coastal landscape), and paalai (desert landscape). Nevertheless, Pari Perumal's explanations also differ from those of Manakkudavar in many places. For instance, his commentary varies from that of Manakkudavar in couplets 1081, 1178, and 1195. He also refers to other early commentators besides Manakkudavar in places such as couplets 480 and 1116.

Like other medieval commentators, Pari Perumal had an extraordinary command of both Tamil and Sanskrit. He quotes several Tamil and Sanskrit works across his commentary. For instance, he cites the Tolkappiyam (verse 22 under the Meippaattiyal) in couplets 1126 through 1129 in the third book of the Kural text. At the beginning of the third book, he quotes on the sutras of the Tolkappiyam (verse 14 under the Kalaviyal) and the Iraiyanar Agapporul. In couplet 641, he cites verse 252 of the Purananuru. In couplet 687, he bases his elaboration on a verse from the Bharatha Venba.

Pari Perumal was also well-versed in the Sanskrit works of Kamasutra and Arthasastra. In Chapter 51, which appears in the second book of the Kural text, he quotes the philosophies of Drona, Chanakya, Narada, Parashara, Vyadha Gita, and Uddhavacharya doctrines in couplets 503, 504, 505, 507, 508, and 510, respectively. He also narrates many stories in his commentary to explicate the meaning of the Kural couplets as in couplets 431, 432, 437, 439, and 440. He cites Vatsyayana's Kamasutra at the beginning of the third book of the Kural text.

Pari Perumal also possessed excellent social and worldly knowledge. This is revealed in his explanations to couplets 522, 527, 529 and 530, where he describes the societal structure of his time. Pari Perumal's analytical skills are revealed when he elaborates envoy in three different types, namely, primary, secondary, and tertiary. According to him, the primary envoys are those one who sense the situation and act, the secondary ones are those who acts according to instructed, and the tertiary ones are those who simply passes the message. Like Paridhiyar, Pari Perumal employs storytelling in several places to explain the moral of a given Kural couplet. This can be seen in his explanations to the couplets of the chapter on the correction of faults (Chapter 44) in Book II.

Verses 1540 and 1541 of the Perunthogai indicate that Pari Perumal's commentary was not accepted by the masses during his time. Nevertheless, Pari Perumal hints that without a holistic understanding of the essence of the Tirukkural, one's effort to delve deep into the work would be fruitless.

== Variations in ordering of the Kural verses ==
The following table depicts the variations among the early commentators' ordering of, for example, the first ten verses of the Tirukkural. Note that the ordering of the verses and chapters as set by Parimelalhagar, which had been followed unanimously for centuries ever since, has now been accepted as the standard structure of the Kural text.

Kural verse beginning	Couplet ordering				
Kural verse beginning	Manakkudavar's	Pari Perumal's	Paridhi's	Kaalingar's	Parimelalhagar's
Kural 1: அகர முதல எழுத்தெல்லாம்	1	1	1	1	1
Kural 2: கற்றதனால் ஆய பயன்	2	2	2	2	2
Kural 3: மலர்மிசை ஏகினான் மாணடி	3	3	3	3	3
Kural 4: வேண்டுதல் வேண்டாமை இலான்	6	6	5	7	4
Kural 5: இருள்சேர் இருவினையும் சேரா	7	7	6	6	5
Kural 6: பொறிவாயில் ஐந்தவித்தான்	8	8	7	7	6
Kural 7: தனக்கு உவமை இல்லாதான்	4	4	6	4	7
Kural 8: அற ஆழி அந்தணன்	5	5	10	9	8
Kural 9: கோளில் பொறியில் குணமிலவே	10	10	8	5	9
Kural 10: பிறவிப் பெருங்கடல் நீந்துவர்	9	9	9	10	10

It is found that there are 16 variations found in the ordering of the Kural couplets by Pari Perumal with respect to the commentary by Manakkudavar. Thus, Pari Perumal's commentary remains the closest resembling work to the Manakkudavar commentary.

== See also ==
- Ten Medieval Commentators
- Bhashya
- Commentaries in Tamil literary tradition
