= Paridhi (name) =

Name list

Paridhi is a given name in the English language. It is a name for girls or boys based on the language in India, Sri Lanka and Bhutan. The name has independent origins from Tamil and Sanskrit. It translates to Sun in tamil and realm/limit in sanskrit. Reference to the sun are seen in a song written by Subramania_Bharati.

Notable people with name include :

- Paridhi Sharma (born 1987), an Indian actress/director.
- Paridhi (born 11th century), a Tamil literary commentator
