= Nishkama Karma =

Selfless or desireless action in Hinduism

Nishkama Karma (Sanskrit IAST : Niṣkāmakarma), self-less or desireless action, is an action performed without any expectation of fruits or results, and the central tenet of the Karma Yoga path to liberation. Its modern advocates press upon achieving success following the principles of Yoga, and stepping beyond personal goals and agendas while pursuing any action for greater good, which has become well known since it is the central message of the Bhagavad Gita.

In Indian philosophy, action or Karma is divided into three categories based on their intrinsic qualities or gunas. Nishkama Karma belongs to the first category, the Sattva (pure) or actions which add to calmness; The Sakama Karma (Self-centred action) comes in the second rājasika (aggression) and Vikarma (worst-action) comes under the third, tāmasika which correlates to darkness or inertia.

== Etymology ==
Nishkama comes from the root word nih, meaning a negation, and kama, meaning desire. Karma means action.

== Nishkama Karma in the workplace ==
The opposite of Sakama Karma (action with desire), Nishkama Karma has been variously explained as 'Duty for duty's sake' and as 'Detached Involvement', which is neither negative attitude nor indifference; and has today found many advocates in the modern business area where the emphasis has shifted to ethical business practices adhering to intrinsic human values and reducing stress at the workplace.

Another aspect that differentiates it from Sakama or selfish action, is that while the former is guided by inspiration, the latter is all about motivation, and that makes the central difference in its results, for example, Sakama Karma might lead to excessive work pressure and workaholism as it aims at success, and hence creates more chances of physical and psychological burnouts. Moreover, Nishkama Karma means a more balanced approach to work, and as work has been turned into a pursuit of personal excellence, which results in greater personal satisfaction, which one would have otherwise sought in job satisfaction coming from external rewards. One important fallout of the entire shift is that where one is essentially an ethical practice inside-out leading to the adage, ‘Work is worship’ show itself literally at the workplace, leading to greater work commitment, the other since it is so much result oriented can lead to unethical business and professional ethics, as seen so often at modern workplace.

The central tenet of practicing Nishkama Karma is mindfulness in the present moment. Over time, this practice leads to not only equanimity of mind as it allows the practitioner to stay detached from results, and hence from ups and downs of business that are inevitable in any business arena, while maintaining constant work commitment since work has now been turned into a personal act of worship. Further in the long run it leads to cleansing of the heart but also spiritual growth and holistic development.

== Nishkama Karma in the Bhagavad Gita ==
Nishkama Karma has an important role in the Bhagavad Gita, the central text of Mahabharata, where Krishna advocates 'Nishkama Karma Yoga' (the Yoga of Selfless Action) as the ideal path to realize the Truth. Allocated work done without expectations, motives, or thinking about its outcomes tends to purify one's mind and gradually makes an individual fit to see the value of reason and the benefits of renouncing the work itself. These concepts are described in the following verses:

To action alone hast thou a right and never at all to its fruits; let not the fruits of action be thy motive; neither let there be in thee any attachment to inaction.
— Verse 47, Chapter 2-Samkhya theory and Yoga practise, The Bhagavadgita

Fixed in yoga, do thy work, O Winner of wealth (Arjuna), abandoning attachment, with an even mind in success and failure, for evenness of mind is called yoga
— Verse 2.48

With the body, with the mind, with the intellect, even merely with the senses, the Yogis perform action toward self-purification, having abandoned attachment. He who is disciplined in Yoga, having abandoned the fruit of action, attains steady peace...
— Verse 5.11

== Nishkama Karma in the Kural ==
The concept of Nishkama Karma is spread across various chapters of the Tirukkural, particularly in the last five chapters of Book I. Accordingly, Valluvar insists that all worldly attachments be renounced gradually and in right time. This can primarily be noted in couplets 341 and 342 of Chapter 35.

== See also ==
- Karma
- Karma Yoga
- Puruṣārtha
