= Puruṣārtha =

Four goals of human life in Hinduism

Purushartha (Sanskrit: पुरुषार्थ, romanized: Puruṣārtha; pronounced [pu.ɾu.ʂɑːɾ.tʰɐ]) literally means "object(ive) of mankind". It is a key concept in Hinduism, and refers to the four dimensions of a human life. The four puruṣārthas are Dharma (righteousness, moral values), Artha (prosperity, economic values), Kama (pleasure, love, psychological values) and Moksha (liberation, spiritual values, self-realization).

All four Purusharthas are important, but in cases of conflict, Dharma is considered more important than Artha or Kama in Hindu philosophy. Moksha is considered the ultimate goal of human life. At the same time, this is not a consensus among all Hindus, and many have different interpretations of the hierarchy, and even as to whether one should exist.

Historical Indian scholars recognized and debated the inherent tension between active pursuit of wealth (Artha) and pleasure (Kama), and renunciation of all wealth and pleasure for the sake of spiritual liberation (Moksha). They proposed "action with renunciation" or "craving-free, dharma-driven action", also called Nishkama Karma as a possible solution to the tension.

== Etymology ==
Puruṣārtha (पुरुषार्थ) is a composite Sanskrit word from Purusha (पुरुष) and Artha (अर्थ). Purusha means "man", "immaterial essence", or "primaeval human being as the soul and original source of the universe", depending on the darsana, the school of thought. Artha in one context means "purpose", "object of desire" and "meaning". Together, Purushartha literally means "purpose of human being" or "object of human pursuit".

Alf Hiltebeitel translates Purushartha as "Goals of Man". Prasad clarifies that "Man" includes both man and woman in ancient and medieval Indian texts. Olivelle translates it as the "aims of human life". In his book Bhagavad-Gita As It Is, Prabhupada describes Purusartha as "material religiosity, economic development, sense gratification and, at the end, the attempt to become one with the Supreme."

Purushartha is also referred to as Chaturvarga.

== Discussion ==
Purushartha is a key concept in Hinduism, which holds that every human has four proper goals that are necessary and sufficient for a fulfilling and happy life,

- Dharma – signifies behaviors that are considered to be in accord with rta, the order that makes life and universe possible, and includes duties, rights, laws, conduct, virtues and right way of living. Hindu dharma includes the religious duties, moral rights and duties of each individual, as well as behaviors that enable social order, right conduct, and those that are virtuous. Dharma, according to van Buitenen, is that which all existing beings must accept and respect to sustain harmony and order in the world. It is, states van Buitenen, the pursuit and execution of one's nature and true calling, thus playing one's role in cosmic concert.
- Artha – signifies the "means of life", activities and resources that enables one to be in a state one wants to be in. Artha incorporates wealth, career, activity to make a living, financial security and economic prosperity. The proper pursuit of artha is considered an important aim of human life in Hinduism.
- Kama – signifies desire, wish, passion, emotions, pleasure of the senses, the aesthetic enjoyment of life, affection, or love, with or without lustful connotations. Gavin Flood explains kāma as "love" without violating dharma (moral responsibility), artha (material prosperity) and one's journey towards moksha (spiritual liberation).
- Moksha – signifies emancipation, liberation or release. In some schools of Hinduism, moksha connotes freedom from saṃsāra, the cycle of death and rebirth, in other schools moksha connotes freedom, self-knowledge, self-realization and liberation in this life.

=== Relative importance between four goals of life ===
Ancient Indian literature emphasizes that dharma is foremost. If dharma is ignored, artha and kama - profit and pleasure respectively - lead to social chaos. The Gautama Dharmashastra, Apastamba Dharmasutra and Yājñavalkya Smṛti, as examples, all suggest that dharma comes first and is more important than artha and kama.

Kama states the relative value of three goals as follows: artha is more important and should precede kama, while dharma is more important and should precede both kama and artha. Kautiliya's Arthashastra, however, argues that artha is the foundation for the other two. Without prosperity and security in society or at individual level, both moral life and sensuality become difficult. Poverty breeds vice and hate, while prosperity breeds virtues and love, suggested Kautiliya. Kautilya adds that all three are mutually connected, and one should not cease enjoying life, nor virtuous behavior, nor pursuit of wealth creation. Excessive pursuit of any one aspect of life with complete rejection of other two, harms all three including the one excessively pursued. The sastras, states Kane, observe that the relative precedence of artha, kama and dharma are naturally different with age.

Moksha is considered in Hinduism as the parama-puruṣārtha or ultimate goal of human life.

=== Resolution between four goals of life ===
Indian scholars recognized and have debated the inherent tension between renunciation and Moksha on one hand, and the active pursuit of Kama and Artha on the other. This has led to the concepts of Pravrtti (प्रवृत्ति, Pravritti) and Nivrtti (निवृत्ति, Nivritti), with the former meaning "giving or devoting one's self to" external action (with oneself's Dharma or essence at that stage towards Artha and Kama), while the latter means "withdrawing and restraining one's self from" external action in order to focus on one's own liberation (with oneself's Dharma or essence at that stage towards Moksha). Artha and Kama are Pravrtti, while Moksha is Nivrtti. Both are considered important in Hinduism. Manusmriti, for example, describes it as,

Activity, according to orthodox tradition, is of two kinds: pravrtti and nivrtti,
The first kind of activity leads to progress (abhyudaya), and the second, to perfection (nihsreyasa).

— Manusmriti, 12.88

Indian scholars offered a creative "resolution" to the tension between "action"-filled life and "renunciation"-driven life, by suggesting the best of both worlds can be achieved by dedicating oneself to "action with renunciation", that is when "action is without attachment or craving for results". Action must be engaged in because it is Dharma, that is, it is good, virtuous, right, a duty and a moral activity, and not because of one's craving for the results or material rewards without any consideration for Dharma. This idea of "craving-free, dharma-driven action" has been called Nishkama Karma in Bhagavad Gita. Other Indian texts state the same answer to tension between "pursue wealth and love" versus "renounce everything" Purusharthas, but using different words. Isa Upanishad, for example, states "act and enjoy with renunciation, do not covet".

=== Origins of puruṣārtha theory ===
The concept of mokṣa appears in the Upanishads, while the preceding Samhitas, Brahmanas and Aranyakas commonly refer to kāma, artha and dharma as the "trivarga" or "three categories" of possible human pursuits. The Dharmaśāstras and the epics Ramayana and Mahabharata are the first known sources that comprehensively present the notion that integrated living entails the pursuit of four goals or ends. Prasad (2008) states that the division between the trivarga and mokṣa is intended to highlight the context between the social (trivarga) and personal (mokṣa) spheres.

The Sannyasa is entirely focussed on the pursuit of Moksha without violating Dharma. Baudhayana Dharmasūtra, completed by about 7th century BC, states the following behavioral vows for a person in Sannyasa,

These are the vows a Sannyasi must keep –

Abstention from injuring living beings, truthfulness, abstention from appropriating the property of others, abstention from sensual pleasures, liberality (kindness, gentleness) are the major vows. There are five minor vows: abstention from anger, obedience towards the guru, avoidance of rashness, cleanliness, and purity in eating. He should beg (for food) without annoying others, any food he gets he must compassionately share a portion with other living beings, sprinkling the remainder with water he should eat it as if it were a medicine.

— Baudhāyana, Dharmasūtra, II.10.18.1–10

Baudhāyana also makes repeated references to the Sannyasa (ascetic) stage and its behavioral focus, such as in verses II.13.7 and 11.18.13. This reference, Olivelle states, is found in many early to mid 1st millennium BC texts, and is clearly from gnomic poetry about an established ascetic tradition by the time Baudhayana Dharmasutra and other texts were written. Katha Upanishad, in hymns 2.1–2.2 contrasts the human feeling of pleasant (preyas, प्रेयस्) with that of bliss (sreyas, श्रेयस्), praising the latter. The hymns of Rig Veda in Book 10 Chapter 136, mention Muni (मुनि, monks, mendicants, holy man), with characteristics that mirror those found in later concepts of renunication-practising, Moksha-motivated ascetics (Sannyasins and Sannyasinis). These Muni are said to be Kesins (केशिन्, long haired) wearing Mala clothes (मल, dirty, soil-colored, yellow, orange, saffron) and engaged in the affairs of Mananat (mind, meditation).

केश्यग्निं केशी विषं केशी बिभर्ति रोदसी । केशी विश्वं स्वर्दृशे केशीदं ज्योतिरुच्यते ॥१॥ '''मुनयो''' वातरशनाः पिशङ्गा वसते मला । वातस्यानु ध्राजिं यन्ति यद्देवासो अविक्षत ॥२॥

He with the long loose locks (of hair) supports Agni, and moisture, heaven, and earth; He is all sky to look upon: he with long hair is called this light. The Munis, girdled with the wind, wear garments of soil hue; They, following the wind's swift course go where the Gods have gone before.

— Rig Veda, Hymn 10.CXXXVI.1–2

Scharfe states, "there are abundant references both to the trivarga and caturvarga in Hindu literature throughout the ages".

== Purushartha-focused literature ==
Each of these four canonical puruṣārthas was subjected to a process of study and extensive literary development in Indian history. This produced numerous treatises, with a diversity of views, in each category. Some Purushartha-focused literature include,

- On Dharma

These texts discuss dharma from various religious, social, duties, morals and personal ethics perspective. Each of six major schools of Hinduism has its own literature on dharma. Examples include Dharma-sutras (particularly by Gautama, Apastamba, Baudhayana and Vāsiṣṭha) and Dharma-sastras (particularly Manusmṛti, Yājñavalkya Smṛti, Nāradasmṛti and Viṣṇusmṛti). At personal dharma level, this includes many chapters of Yogasutras. The Book I of the Tamil moral text of the Tirukkural exclusively focuses on aram, the Tamil term for dharma, although the entire work of the Tirukkural keeps dharma as its base.

- On Artha

Artha-related texts discuss artha from individual, social and as a compendium of economic policies, politics and laws. For example, the Arthashastra of Kauṭilya, the Kamandakiya Nitisara, Brihaspati Sutra, and Sukra Niti. Olivelle states that most Artha-related treatises from ancient India have been lost. The Book II of the Tirukkural primarily focuses on porul, the Tamil term for artha.

- On Kama

These discuss arts, emotions, love, erotics, relationships and other sciences in the pursuit of pleasure. The Kamasutra of Vātsyāyana is most well known. Others texts include Ratirahasya, Jayamangala, Smaradipika, Ratimanjari, Ratiratnapradipika, Ananga Ranga among others. While the Book III of the Tirukkural primarily focuses on inbam, the Tamil term for kama, it remains unique in the sense that, unlike the Kamasutra, the Tirukkural's Book of Inbam remains a poetic appreciation of flowering human love as explicated by the Sangam period's concept of intimacy, known as agam in the Tamil literary tradition.

- On Moksha

These develop and debate the nature and process of liberation, freedom and spiritual release. Major treatises on the pursuit of moksa include the Upanishads, Vivekachudamani, Bhagavad Gita, and the sastras on Yoga, in particular the fourth portion of Patanjali's Sutras.

The Sanskrit Epics devote major sections on purusharthas, in particular debating dharma. The ancient Tamil moral literature of the Tirukkural focuses on the first three of the purusharthas (Dharma, Artha, and Kama) without discussing Moksha, suggesting that "the proper pursuit of the other three will inevitably lead to the fourth." The Nalatiyar, another work of the Sangam literature, too, follows similar philosophy as the Tirukkural.

== Ashrama ==
The four puruṣārthas are often discussed in the context of four ashramas or stages of life (Brahmacharya – student, Grihastha – householder, Vanaprastha – retirement, and Sannyasa – renunciation). Scholars have attempted to connect the four stages to the four puruṣārthas; however, Olivelle dismisses this, as neither ancient nor medieval texts of India state that any of the first three ashramas must devote itself predominantly to one specific goal of life.

The fourth stage of Sannyasa is different, and the overwhelming consensus in ancient and medieval Indian texts is that anyone accepting Sannyasa must entirely devote themself to Moksha, aided by Dharma, with a complete renunciation of Artha and Kama.

With the known exception of Kamasutra, most texts make no recommendation on the relative preference on Artha or Kama, that an individual must emphasize in what stage of life. The Kamasutra states,

The life span of a man is one hundred years. Dividing that time, he should attend to three aims of life in such a way that they support, rather than hinder each other. In his youth he should attend to profitable aims (artha) such as learning, in his prime to pleasure (kama), and in his old age to dharma and moksha.

— Kamasutra 1.2.1–1.2.4, Translated by Patrick Olivelle

This text does not mention the ashramas, however.

== See also ==
The four proper goals of a human in Hindu traditions:

- Dharma
- Artha
- Kama
- Moksha
- Arishadvargas

Other elements of ethical theories in Hindu traditions:

- Ashrama (stage)
- Yamas
- Niyama
- Karma

Other theories on human needs:

- Maslow's hierarchy of needs
- Need theory
- Metamotivation
