= Artha =

Indian philosophical term

Artha (/ˈɑːrtə, -θə/; Sanskrit: अर्थ; Pali: Attha, Tamil: பொருள், poruḷ) is one of the four goals or objectives of human life in Hindu traditions. It includes career, skills, health, wealth, prosperity and the means or resources needed for a fulfilling life. The word artha literally translates as "meaning, sense, goal, purpose or essence" depending on the context. Artha is also a broader concept in the scriptures of Hinduism, Buddhism and Jainism. As a concept, it has multiple meanings, all of which imply "means of life", activities and resources that enable one to be in a state one wants to be in.

Artha applies to both an individual and a government. In an individual's context, artha includes wealth, career, activity to make a living, financial security and economic prosperity. The proper pursuit of artha is considered an important aim of human life in Hinduism. At government level, artha includes social, legal, economic and worldly affairs. Proper Arthashastra is considered an important and necessary objective of government.

In Hindu traditions, Artha is connected to the three other aspects and goals of human life: Dharma (virtuous, proper, moral life), Kama (pleasure, sensuality, emotional fulfillment) and Moksha (liberation, release, self-actualization). Together, these four mutually non-exclusive aims of life are called Puruṣārtha.

== Definition and meaning ==
Artha as a concept includes multiple meanings. It is difficult to capture the meaning of artha, or related terms of dharma, kama and moksha, each in a single English word.

Artha, as a goal of life, involves the pursuit of wealth and power. Some traditions see it as the primary human objective, as noted in Manusmriti (2.224). The Arthashastra (1.7.6) emphasizes Artha's importance, with Kautilya stating that material gain is the most crucial of the three ends of life, as it supports the realization of dharma and kama.

James Lochtefeld describes artha as the means of life, and includes material prosperity. Karl Potter explains it as an attitude and capability that enables one to make a living, to remain alive, to thrive as a free person. It includes economic prosperity, security and health of oneself and those one feels responsible for. Artha includes everything in one's environment that allows one to live. It is neither an end state nor an endless goal of aimlessly amassing money, claims Karl Potter, rather it is an attitude and necessary requirement of human life. John Koller takes a different viewpoint than Karl Potter's interpretation. John Koller suggests artha is not an attitude, rather it is one of the necessities of human life. A central premise of Hindu philosophy, claims Koller, is that every person should live a joyous and pleasurable life, that such fulfilling life requires every person's needs and desires be acknowledged and fulfilled, that needs can only be satisfied through activity and when sufficient means for those activities are available. Artha, then, is best described as pursuit of activities and means necessary for a joyous and pleasurable life.

Daya Krishna argues that artha, as well as the concept of Puruṣārthas, is a myth. The various schools and ancient Sanskrit texts provide no consensus opinion, notes Krishna, rather they present a debate, a diversity of views on what artha and Puruṣārtha means. Inconsistencies and conflicting verses are even present within the same script, such as the Manusmriti. Some ancient Indian texts suggest artha are instruments that enable satisfaction of desires; some include wealth, some include power, and some such as the bhakti schools include instruments to love God. Some of this, suggests Krishna, reflects differences in human needs. Perhaps, conjectures Krishna, artha is just a subset of kama and karma.

Vatsyayana in Kama Sutra defines artha as the acquisition of arts, land, cattle, wealth, equipages and friends. He explains, artha is also protection of what is already acquired, and the increase of what is protected.

Gavin Flood explains artha as "worldly success" without violating dharma (moral responsibility), kama (love) and one's journey towards moksha (spiritual liberation). Flood clarifies that artha in ancient Hindu literature, as well as purushartha, is better understood as a goal of Man (not a man). In other words, it is one of the four purposes of human life. The survival and the thriving of humans requires artha – that is, economic activity, wealth and its creation, worldly success, profit, political success and all that is necessary for human existence.

== History ==
The word Artha appears in the oldest known scriptures of India. However, the term connotes 'purpose', goal or 'aim' of something, often as purpose of ritual sacrifices. Over time, artha evolves into a broader concept in the Upanishadic era. It is first included as part of Trivarga concept (three categories of human life - dharma, artha and kama), which over time expanded into the concept Caturvarga (four categories, including moksha). Caturvarga is also referred to as Puruṣārtha.

The Mimamsa school of Hinduism explained artha, dharma and kama by contrasting Puruṣārtha and Kratvartha. Puruṣārtha is human purpose of a yajna, while Kratvartha is sacrificial purpose of a yajna. They recognized and explained all human actions have two effects: first, every act affects itself regardless of actors involved; second, every act has human meanings, hopes and desires and affects each actor in a personal way. Jaimini explained in 3rd century BCE, that this human meaning cannot be separated from the human goal. The phala (fruit, result) of a sacrifice is implicit in the artha (meaning, purpose) of the sacrifice. Mimamsa school then argued that man is for the purpose of actions demanded by Vedic injunctions (apauruseya), and such subordination of man to rituals allows man to reach heaven. Other schools of Hinduism, such as Yoga and Vedanta schools, disagreed with Mimamsa school. They argued that rituals and sacrifice are means, not ends. Their emphasis shifted from rituals to effort and knowledge, from heaven to moksha, from freedom afterlife to freedom in this life, from human being as a cog in cosmic wheel to human being as an end in himself. For example, Aitareya Aranyaka recites:

He knows tomorrow, he knows the world and what is not the world.
By the mortal he desires the immortal, being this endowed.
Man is the sea, he is above all the world.
Whatever he reaches he desires to go beyond it.

— Aitareya Aranyaka, II.1.3

Thereafter came a flowering of the Shastraic literature on Artha and other aims of human beings: of dharma in Dharmashastras, of artha in Arthashastras, of kama in Kamashastras (Kamasutra being one part of the compendium). Different schools of Hinduism offer different perspectives on artha, just like dharma, karma and moksha. Most historical literature of ancient India from about 5th century BCE and after, interlaces all four aims of humans. Many Upanishads as well as the two Indian Epics – the Ramayana and the Mahabharata – discuss and use the words dharma, artha, kama and moksha as part of their respective themes. Even subhasitas, gnomic and didactic Indian literature from 1st and 2nd millennium CE, incorporate artha and other three aims of human life.

== Relative precedence between Artha, Kama and Dharma ==
Ancient Indian literature emphasizes that dharma is foremost. If dharma is ignored, artha and kama – profit and pleasure respectively – lead to social chaos. The Gautama Dharmashastra, Apastamba Dharmasutra and Yājñavalkya Smṛti, as examples, all suggest that dharma comes first and is more important than artha and kama.

Vatsyayana, the author of Kamasutra, recognizes relative value of three goals as follows: artha is more important and should precede kama, while dharma is more important and should precede both kama and artha. Kautiliya's Arthashastra, however, argues that artha is the foundation for the other two. Without prosperity and security in society or at an individual level, both moral life and sensuality become difficult. Poverty breeds vice and hate, while prosperity breeds virtues and love, suggested Kautiliya. Kautilya adds that all three are mutually connected, and one should not cease enjoying life, nor virtuous behavior, nor pursuit of wealth creation. Excessive pursuit of any one aspect of life with complete rejection of other two, harms all three including the one excessively pursued.

Some ancient Indian literature observe that the relative precedence of artha, kama and dharma are naturally different for different people and different age groups. In a baby or child, education and kama takes precedence; in youth kama and artha take precedence; while in old age dharma takes precedence.

The Epics such as the Mahabharata debate the relative precedence of dharma, artha, kama and moksha, through the different characters in Book 12, the Book of Peace. Rishi Vidura says dharma must take the highest precedence. Arjuna claims without profit and prosperity (artha), people's ability for dharma and kama fall apart. Bhima claims pleasure and sex (kama) come first, because without these there is no dharma, artha or moksha. Yudhishthira asserts dharma should always lead one, including in matters of artha and kama, but then admits balancing dharma, artha and kama is often confusing and difficult. In another book, the Mahabharata suggests that morality, profit and pleasure – dharma, artha and kama – all three must go together for happiness:

Morality is well practiced by the good. Morality, however, is always afflicted by two things, the desire of Profit entertained by those that covet it, and the desire for Pleasure cherished by those that are wedded to it. Whoever without afflicting Morality and Profit, or Morality and Pleasure, or Pleasure and Profit, followeth all three – Morality, Profit and Pleasure – always succeeds in obtaining great happiness.

— The Mahabharata, Book 9.60

== Contemporary relevance ==
Gavin Flood suggests the concepts embedded in purushartha, which includes artha, reflect a deep understanding and insights into human nature, and of conflicts which are inevitably faced by all human beings. It is an attempt to acknowledge and encourage one to understand diversity yet seek coherence between people, rather than deny one or more aspects of human life or force a particular precept and code on people.

Donald Davis suggests that artha, kama and dharma are broadly applicable human aims, that extend beyond Hindu studies. They are Indian perspective on the nature of human life, a perspective shared in Jain and Buddhist literature.

== See also ==
- Dharma
- Kama
- Moksha
- Purushartha
- Arthashastra
- Ṛta
- Karma
- Chaitanya Charitamrita
