= Aram (Kural book) =

Tamil philosophical work by Valluvar

The Book of Aṟam, in full Aṟattuppāl (Tamil: அறத்துப்பால், literally, "division of virtue"), also known as the Book of Virtue, the First Book or Book One in translated versions, is the first of the three books or parts of the Kural literature, a didactic work authored by the ancient Indian philosopher Valluvar. Written in High Tamil distich form, it has 38 chapters each containing 10 kurals or couplets, making a total of 380 couplets, all dealing with the fundamental virtues of an individual. Aṟam, the Tamil term that loosely corresponds to the English term 'virtue', correlates with the first of the four ancient Indian values of dharma, artha, kama and moksha. The Book of Aṟam exclusively deals with virtues independent of the surroundings, including the vital principles of non-violence, moral vegetarianism,^{[a]} veracity, and righteousness.

The Book of Aṟam is the most important and the most fundamental book of the Kural. This is revealed in the very order of the book within the Kural literature. The public life of a person as described by the Book of Poruḷ and the love life of a person as described by the Book of Inbam are presented to him or her only after the person secures his or her inner, moral growth described by the Book of Aṟam. In other words, only a morally and spiritually ripe person, who is considered cultured and civilized as dictated by the Book of Aṟam, is fit to enter public or political life, and the subsequent life of love.

== Etymology and meanings ==
Aṟam is the Tamil word for what is known in Sanskrit as 'Dharma', and pāl means 'division'. The concept of aṟam or dharma is of pivotal importance in Indian philosophy and religion. With a long and varied history, the word straddles a complex set of meanings and interpretations, rendering it impossible to provide a single concise definition. Thus, there is no equivalent single-word translation for aṟam or dharma in western languages.

== The book and its chapters ==
The Book of Aṟam is the most important of all the books of the Tirukkural and is considered the most fundamental. The book exclusively deals with dharma, which is common to the entire work of the Tirukkural, thus providing the essence of the work as a whole. An exemplification for this is found in verse 34 of Purananuru, where its author Alathur Kilar refers to the entire work of the Tirukkural by simply calling it as 'Aṟam'. In a practical sense, the Book of Aṟam deals with the essentials of the Yoga philosophy by expounding the household life that begins with compassion and ahimsa, ultimately leading to the path to renunciation.

The Book of Aṟam contains the first 38 chapters of the Kural text, all dealing with fundamental virtue. The first four chapters, known as the introductory chapters, include 40 couplets on God, rain, characteristics of a righteous person, and assertion of virtue. The remaining chapters with 340 couplets are addressed to the common man or a householder, which includes 200 couplets on domestic virtue and 140 couplets on higher yet most fundamental virtue based on grace, benevolence and compassion. All the couplets in the book essentially mandate the ethics of ahimsa (non-violence), meatless diet, casteless human brotherhood, absence of desires, path of righteousness and truth, and so forth.

Outline of the Book of Aṟam

Book One—Virtue (அறத்துப்பால் Aṟattuppāl)

- Chapter 1. The Praise of God (கடவுள் வாழ்த்து kaṭavuḷ vāḻttu): Couplets 1–10
- Chapter 2. The Excellence of Rain (வான் சிறப்பு vāṉ ciṟappu): 11–20
- Chapter 3. The Greatness of Ascetics (நீத்தார் பெருமை nīttār perumai): 21–30
- Chapter 4. Assertion of the Strength of Virtue (அறன் வலியுறுத்தல் aṟaṉ valiyuṟuttal): 31–40
- Chapter 5. Domestic Life (இல்வாழ்க்கை ilvāḻkkai): 41–50
- Chapter 6. Domestic Health (வாழ்க்கைத்துணை நலம் vāḻkkaittuṇai nalam): 51–60
- Chapter 7. Biological Productivity (புதல்வரைப் பெறுதல் putalvaraip peṟutal): 61–70
- Chapter 8. The Possession of Love (அன்புடைமை aṉpuṭaimai): 71–80
- Chapter 9. Cherishing Guests (விருந்தோம்பல் viruntōmpal): 81–90
- Chapter 10. Charming Utterance (இனியவை கூறல் iṉiyavai kūṟal): 91–100
- Chapter 11. Gratitude Recognition (செய்ந்நன்றி அறிதல் ceynnaṉṟi aṟital): 101–110
- Chapter 12. Impartiality (நடுவு நிலைமை naṭuvu nilaimai): 111–120
- Chapter 13. The Possession of Self-restraint (அடக்கமுடைமை aṭakkamuṭaimai): 121–130
- Chapter 14. The Possession of Decorum (ஒழுக்கமுடைமை oḻukkamuṭaimai): 131–140
- Chapter 15. Not Coveting Another's Wife (பிறனில் விழையாமை piṟaṉil viḻaiyāmai): 141–150
- Chapter 16. The Possession of Patience, Forbearance (பொறையுடைமை poṟaiyuṭaimai): 151–160
- Chapter 17. Anti-envy (அழுக்காறாமை aḻukkāṟāmai): 161–170
- Chapter 18. Anti-covet action (வெஃகாமை veḵkāmai): 171–180
- Chapter 19. Slander Avoidance (புறங்கூறாமை puṟaṅkūṟāmai): 181–190
- Chapter 20. The Not Speaking Profitless Words (பயனில சொல்லாமை payaṉila collāmai): 191–200
- Chapter 21. Dread of Evil Deeds (தீவினையச்சம் tīviṉaiyaccam): 201–210
- Chapter 22. The Knowledge of What Is Befitting a Man's Position (ஒப்புரவறிதல் oppuravaṟital): 211–220
- Chapter 23. Philanthropy (ஈகை īkai): 221–230
- Chapter 24. Renown (புகழ் pukaḻ): 231–240
- Chapter 25. Benevolence (அருளுடைமை aruḷuṭaimai): 241–250
- Chapter 26. Flesh Renunciation (புலான் மறுத்தல் pulāṉmaṟuttal): 251–260
- Chapter 27. Penance (தவம் tavam): 261–270
- Chapter 28. Inconsistent Conduct (கூடாவொழுக்கம் kūṭāvoḻukkam): 271–280
- Chapter 29. The Absence of Fraud (கள்ளாமை kaḷḷāmai): 281–290
- Chapter 30. Veracity (வாய்மை vāymai): 291–300
- Chapter 31. The Not Being Angry (வெகுளாமை vekuḷāmai): 301–310
- Chapter 32. Not Doing Evil (இன்னா செய்யாமை iṉṉāceyyāmai): 311–320
- Chapter 33. Not Killing (கொல்லாமை kollāmai): 321–330
- Chapter 34. Impermanence (நிலையாமை nilaiyāmai): 331–340
- Chapter 35. Renunciation (துறவு tuṟavu): 341–350
- Chapter 36. Knowledge of the True (மெய்யுணர்தல் meyyuṇartal): 351–360
- Chapter 37. The Extirpation of Desire (அவாவறுத்தல் avāvaṟuttal): 361–370
- Chapter 38. Fate (ஊழ் ūḻ): 371–380

== Grouping of chapters ==
The Book of Aṟam has historically been subdivided variously by different scholars. In fact, the chapters in this book have been categorized in more varied order than the two other books of the Kural text. Although the author did not group the chapters under any subdivisions as with the other two books of the Kural text, the Sangam poet Sirumedhaviyar first suggested grouping of the chapters under subdivisions in verse 20 of the Tiruvalluva Maalai. Accordingly, he divided the Book of Aṟam into three Iyals, or divisions, namely, pāyiram (the first 4 chapters), aṟam (the next 33 chapters), and ūḻ (the final chapter). Following this, the ten medieval commentators, who were the first to write commentaries about the Tirukkural, divided the Book of Aṟam variously between two and four portions, grouping the original chapters diversely under these divisions and thus changing the order of the chapters widely. For example, while Parimelalhagar divided the Book of Aṟam into two parts, namely, domestic virtue and ascetic virtue, besides keeping the first four chapters under "Introduction", other medieval commentators have divided the Book of Aṟam into four portions, namely, introduction, domestic virtue, ascetic virtue, and fate. Modern commentators such as V. O. Chidambaram Pillai have even gone up to six divisions.

The original grouping and numbering of the chapters, too, were changed considerably by the medieval commentators. For instance, chapters 10, 13, 17, 18, and 19 in the present-day ordering (which follows Parimelalhagar's ordering) under subsection "domestic virtue" are originally chapters 26, 27, 30, 31, and 32, respectively, under subsection "ascetic virtue" in Manakkudavar's ordering. Similarly, the modern chapters 26, 29, 30, 31, 32, and 33, appearing under subsection "ascetic virtue" originally appear as chapters 19, 20, 10, 16, 17, and 18, respectively, under subsection "domestic virtue" in Manakkudavar's ordering. However, being the earliest of all the available commentaries on the Tirukkural, Manakkudavar's commentary is believed to be the closest to the original Kural text as written by Valluvar. Nevertheless, given these subdivisions of domestic and ascetic virtues are later addition, both the domestic and ascetic virtues in the Book of Aṟam are addressed to the householder or commoner. Ascetic virtues in the Kural, according to A. Gopalakrishnann, does not mean renunciation of household life or pursuing of the conventional ascetic life, but only refers to giving up greedy desires and maintaining self-control that is expected of every individual.

== Valluvar's position on aṟam or virtue ==
While religious scriptures generally consider aṟam as a divine virtue, Valluvar describes it as a way of life rather than any spiritual observance, a way of harmonious living that leads to universal happiness. Contrary to what other contemporary works say, Valluvar holds that aṟam is common for all, irrespective of whether the person is a bearer of palanquin or the rider in it. For this reason, Valluvar keeps aṟam as the cornerstone throughout the writing of the Kural literature.

Valluvar considered justice as a facet of aṟam. While ancient Greek philosophers such as Plato, Aristotle, and their descendants opined that justice cannot be defined and that it was a divine mystery, Valluvar positively suggested that a divine origin is not required to define the concept of justice. In the words of V. R. Nedunchezhiyan, justice according to Valluvar "dwells in the minds of those who have knowledge of the standard of right and wrong; so too deceit dwells in the minds which breed fraud." Gradually, toward the end of the Book of Aṟam, Valluvar emphasizes on the concept of Nishkama Karma, accordingly insisting that all worldly attachments be renounced gradually and in right time. This can primarily be noted in couplets 341 and 342 from the chapter on renunciation.

The greatest of virtues or aṟam according to Valluvar is non-killing, followed by veracity, both of which are indicated in the same couplet (Kural 323), and the greatest sins that Valluvar feels very strongly are ingratitude and meat-eating. In the words of P. S. Sundaram, while "all other sins may be redeemed, but never ingratitude," Valluvar could not understand "how anyone could wish to fatten himself by feeding on the fat of others."

== Influence ==
Of the three books of the Kural text, the Book of Aṟam remains the most translated one by scholars and writers and also the most widely interpreted one. Serving as a manual of precepts to exclusively teach dharma for millennia, the Book of Aṟam has influenced many of its readers to pursue the path of non-violence. This became more evident after the translation of the Kural into several European languages beginning in the early 18th century. For instance, Russian pacifist Leo Tolstoy was inspired by the concept of ahimsa and non-killing found in the Book of Aṟam after reading a German translation of the Kural, which bolstered his thoughts on pacifism. Tolstoy, in turn, instilled the virtue of non-violence in Mohandas Gandhi through his A Letter to a Hindu when young Gandhi sought his advice on the struggle for Indian Independence. Referring to the Kural literature as 'the Hindu Kural' in his correspondence, Tolstoy cited six couplets from the chapter on non-violence. Taking this advice, Gandhi then took to studying the Kural while in prison, later employing various non-violent movements to liberate the nation. The South Indian philosopher Ramalinga Swamigal was inspired by the Kural at a young age and spent his whole life promoting compassion and non-violence, emphasizing on a meatless way of life.

The Kural text, and the chapters from the Book of Aram in particular, are commonly quoted in vegetarian conferences, both in India and abroad, and are frequently cited on social media and online forums involving discussions on the topics of animal rights, non-killing, and shunning meat.

== See also ==
- Inbam (Kural book)
- Porul (Kural book)
- Tao Te Ching

== Notes ==
a. The Kural insists strictly on "moral vegetarianism", the doctrine that humans are morally obligated to refrain from eating meat or harming sentient beings. The concept of ahimsa or இன்னா செய்யாமை, which remains the moral foundation of vegetarianism and veganism, is described in the chapter on non-violence (Chapter 32).
