= Manakkudavar =

Medieval Indian literary scholar of the Tamil language

- Born: 10th century CE; Manakkudi, Tamil Nadu, India
- Died: 10th century CE
- Occupations: Scholar, poet
- Writing career
- Language: Tamil
- Period: 10th century CE
- Notable work: Commentary to the Tirukkural

Manakkudavar (c. 10th century CE) was a Tamil scholar and commentator known for his commentary on the Tirukkural. His is the earliest of the available commentaries on the Kural text, and hence considered to bear closest semblance with the original work by Valluvar. He was among the canon of Ten Medieval Commentators of the Kural text most highly esteemed by scholars. He was also among the five ancient commentators whose commentaries had been preserved and made available to the modern era, the others being Pari Perumal, Kaalingar, Paridhi, and Parimelalhagar.

The commentary of Manakkudavar remains the second most popular commentary on the Kural text, next only to that of Parimelalhagar.

== Early life ==
Little is known about Manakkudavar in comparison with other medieval commentators. This is partly due to the lack of any introductory texts in his commentary. There is no information about his parents either. Manakkudavar is believed to have been born in Manakkudi, from which he came to be referred to as "Manakkudiyaar", and later as "Manakkudavar". Since there are several towns in Tamil Nadu bearing the name "Manakkudi", it is difficult to pinpoint which of these towns was his home town. It is also said that "Manakkudi" is also the name of his clan. He lived around the 10th century CE. He was the oldest of the ten medieval commentators. Manakkudavar's mentioning of several earlier interpretations in various places in his commentary, including his explications to couplets 17 and 389, reveals that there were several earlier commentaries on the Kural literature before his time, which are now completely lost.

In spite of his erudition, Mannakkudavar sounds very humble throughout the writing of his commentary on the Kural literature.

== Religion ==
Manakkudavar belonged to the Jain community. This is revealed in various places in his commentary, such as his explanations given to couplets 1, 3, 268, 352, 377, 398, 429, 622, 627, and 1103.

== Commentary on the Kural ==
Manakkudavar's commentary features a simple and lucid flow of language. Scholars consider his commentary as following the Tamil culture without the influence of Sanskrit works. He readily expresses his hesitations wherever he appears doubtful about his interpretation. In certain places where Valluvar has employed "intentional discrepancies," Manakkudavar clarifies the "discrepancy" by pointing the connection with other couplets elsewhere in the work. Only in few places, such as couplets 2, 401 and 802, does Manakkudavar cite other ancient didactic works, including the Naladiyar and Nanmanikkatigai, to exemplify. In various places, such as couplets 29, 269 and 274, Manakkudavar also cites various stories and incidents from ancient Indian epics such as Mahabharata and various Puranas. For instance, he cites the Puranas and ancient maxims In his explanations to couplets 28, 284, 778, and 1198. He explicates the distinct meaning of difficult words found in such couplets as 125, 154, 211, 340, 350, 548, 580, 649, 674, 715, 731, 1135 and 1324 to simplify comprehension. To elucidate the substance of certain couplets, he further elaborates on the synonyms of the key terms found in couplets 4, 431, 637, 725, 762, 897, 944, 1183, 1208, 1234 and 1313. In instances such as couplets 275, 306, 856, 1043, 1129, 1144, 1154 and 1233, he offers linguistic and grammatical explanations. In couplets such as 130 and 134, he provides the reader with the very essence of the thought that the couplet attempt to convey. Manakkudavar has also employed contemporary colloquial dialect and proverbial sayings in such couplets as 118, 329, 405, 812, 915, 1057 and 1194. In instances such as couplets 327, 429, 586, 631, 941, 945, 1179 and 1323. In very few places, Manakkudavar's explanations appear less satisfactory compared with other commentators, as those instances in couplets 21, 153 and 591. The fact that Manakkudavar's commentary served as the cornerstone and guide for other medieval commentators, including Parimelalhagar, cannot be overstated.

Manakkudavar appears to be the first commentator to divide all the three books of the work into subdivisions known in Tamil as iyals. He briefly and lucidly explains the significance and essence of each subdivision and each chapter within a given subdivision. According to Selvakesavaraya Mudaliyar in his work Tiruvalluvar, Manakkudavar originally divided Book III of the Kural text into five iyals attributed to the moods of five divisions of the Sangam landscape, known as thinai, namely kurinji (mountainous landscape), mullai (forest and pastoral landscape), marudam (agricultural plains and valleys), neidhal (coastal landscape), and paalai (desert landscape). However, several modern publishers do not strictly follow these divisions while publishing Manakkudavar's commentary, and instead structure the commentary according to Parimelalhagar's divisions. Manakkudavar is also known for his style of reordering the couplets within the chapter in order to keep together the couplets that closely resembled in meaning. This is adopted by later commentators, chiefly Parimelalhagar who additionally imparts new perspectives to Manakkudavar's elaborations.

The word arrangement of Manakkudavar is often considered by modern scholars to be better than that of Parimelalhagar. According to P. S. Sundaram, Manakkudavar's "division of words makes better sense without any sacrifice of the metrical requirements." Manakkudavar also clears any apparent ambiguity that may arise while connecting the substance of different couplets. For instance, he clarifies the seemingly contradicting thoughts in couplets 382 and 428 by explaining how they are intricately related.

== Variations in ordering of the Kural verses ==
The following table depicts the variations among the early commentators' ordering of, for example, the first ten verses of the Tirukkural. Note that the ordering of the verses and chapters as set by Parimelalhagar, which had been followed unanimously for centuries ever since, has now been accepted as the standard structure of the Kural text.

Kural verse beginning	Couplet ordering				
Kural verse beginning	Manakkudavar's	Pari Perumal's	Paridhi's	Kaalingar's	Parimelalhagar's
Kural 1: அகர முதல எழுத்தெல்லாம்	1	1	1	1	1
Kural 2: கற்றதனால் ஆய பயன்	2	2	2	2	2
Kural 3: மலர்மிசை ஏகினான் மாணடி	3	3	3	3	3
Kural 4: வேண்டுதல் வேண்டாமை இலான்	6	6	5	7	4
Kural 5: இருள்சேர் இருவினையும் சேரா	7	7	6	6	5
Kural 6: பொறிவாயில் ஐந்தவித்தான்	8	8	7	7	6
Kural 7: தனக்கு உவமை இல்லாதான்	4	4	6	4	7
Kural 8: அற ஆழி அந்தணன்	5	5	10	9	8
Kural 9: கோளில் பொறியில் குணமிலவே	10	10	8	5	9
Kural 10: பிறவிப் பெருங்கடல் நீந்துவர்	9	9	9	10	10

Being the earliest available commentary of the Tirukkural, Manakkudavar's work is considered to bear the closest semblance with the original work of the Kural text by Valluvar. Thus, Manakkudavar's commentary is considered the cornerstone against which other commentaries are compared to find variations in them. Researchers have found as many as 16, 20, 120, and 171 variations in the ordering of the Kural couplets by Pari Perumal, Paridhi, Parimelalhagar, and Kaalingar, respectively, with respect to the commentary by Manakkudavar.

The later commentators not only changed the original ordering of the couplets, but also changed the ordering of the chapters, chiefly in Book I of the Kural text. The modern chapters 10, 13, 17, 18, and 19 appearing under the subsection "Domestic virtues" of the Kural text appear as chapters 26, 27, 30, 31, and 32, respectively, under the subsection "Ascetic virtues" in Manakkudavar's commentary. Similarly, the modern chapters 26, 29, 30, 31, 32, 33, appearing under the subsection "Ascetic virtues" appear as chapters 19, 20, 10, 16, 17, 18, respectively, under the subsection "Domestic virtues" in Manakkudavar's work. The following table lists the variations between ordering of chapters in Book I by Manakkudavar (the oldest of the Medieval commentators) and that by Parimelalhagar (the latest).

Manakkudavar's ordering		Parimelalhagar's ordering (followed today)	
Chapters under subdivision "Domestic virtues" 5. Household life 6. The virtues of a wife 7. Offspring; 8. Loving-kindness; 9. Hospitality; 10. Not lying 11. Gratitude; 12. Impartiality; 13. Patience; 14. Right conduct 15. Not coveting another's wife 16. Refraining from anger 17. Ahimsa/not doing harm 18. Not killing 19. Shunning meat-eating 20. Not stealing 21. Dread of evil deeds 22. Social duty 23. Generosity; 24. Glory	Chapters under subdivision "Ascetic virtues" 25. Benevolence, mercy, and compassion 26. Kindness of speech 27. Self-control; 28. Austerities; 29. Hypocrisy; 30. Not envying 31. Not coveting another's goods 32. Not backbiting 33. Not uttering useless words 34. Instability; 35. Relinquishment; 36. Realization of the truth 37. Rooting out desire	Chapters under subdivision "Domestic virtues" 5. Household life 6. The virtues of a wife 7. Offspring; 8. Loving-kindness; 9. Hospitality; 10. Kindness of speech 11. Gratitude; 12. Impartiality; 13. Self-control; 14. Right conduct 15. Not coveting another's wife 16. Patience; 17. Not envying 18. Not coveting another's goods 19. Not backbiting 20. Not uttering useless words 21. Dread of evil deeds 22. Social duty 23. Generosity; 24. Glory	Chapters under subdivision "Ascetic virtues" 25. Benevolence, mercy, and compassion 26. Shunning meat-eating 27. Austerities; 28. Hypocrisy; 29. Not stealing 30. Not lying 31. Refraining from anger 32. Ahimsa/not doing harm 33. Not killing 34. Instability; 35. Relinquishment; 36. Realization of the truth 37. Rooting out desire

Spelling, homophonic, and other minor textual variations between Manakkudavar and Parimelalhagar commentaries are found in several verses such as couplets 139, 256, 317, and 445.

== Publication of the commentary ==
Although the Kural text first came to print in 1812, becoming the first book ever published in Tamil, Manakkudavar's commentary did not appear in print for the next one hundred years. It was Parimelalhagar's commentary, which first appeared in print in 1840, that was published widely until then. It was only in 1917 that Manakkudavar's commentary for the first book of the Kural text was published by V. O. Chidambaram Pillai. Manakkudavar commentary for the entire Kural text was first published in 1925 by K. Ponnusami Nadar. However, there are sources that claim that the first to publish Manakkudavar's commentary were Thiruvenkatavan University, Shrilashri Thampiran Vidhwan D. Pattuswami Odhuvar, and Palaniappa Pillai, all of whom published independently of each other.

== Reception ==
Manakkudavar's commentary on the Kural text remains the second most popular, next only to that of Parimelalhagar. It remains the next reference point to understand the Kural text after Parimelalhagar's commentary and the second most analyzed Tirukkural commentary, chiefly by those who is critical of Parimelalhagar's commentary. According to M. S. Purnalingam Pillai, Manakudavar's commentary "shows a knowledge of the Tamilian traditions, manners, customs and civilisation, and the arrangement of the verses in each chapter is rational and significant."

== See also ==
- Ten Medieval Commentators
- Bhashya
- Commentaries in Tamil literary tradition
