= Daya Krishna =

Indian philosopher

Daya Krishna (1924–2007) was an Indian philosopher. He was Pro Vice Chancellor of Rajasthan University and editor of the Journal of Indian Council of Philosophical Research for over three decades. He has published works in the fields of Indian philosophy, Western philosophy and aesthetics. His doctoral thesis published as The Nature of Philosophy is said to have been acclaimed by the British philosopher, Gilbert Ryle, as an outstanding work. His work explores the possibility of looking at Indian traditions through resources drawn from Indian concepts and categories. He has attempted to bring about "a dialogue between traditional Pundits, thinking and writing in Sanskrit, and scholars who “do” Indian philosophy in English".

== Important works ==
- Contrary Thinking: Selected Essays of Daya Krishna (2011)
- Prolegomena to Any Future: Historiography of Cultures & Civilizations (1997)
- Bhakti, a contemporary discussion: philosophical explorations in the Indian Bhakti tradition (Ed with Mukunda Lāṭha, Francine Ellison) (2000)
- Developments in Indian philosophy from Eighteenth century onwards: Classical and Western (2002)
- Indian Philosophy: a counter perspective (2006)
- The Problematic and Conceptual Structure of Classical Indian Thought About Man, Society and Polity (1996)
- The Art of the Conceptual: Explorations in a Conceptual Maze Over Three Decades (1989)
- The Nature of Philosophy (1955)
