= Bhashya =

Work of commentaries in Indian literature

Bhashya (Sanskrit: भाष्य, Bhāṣya) is a "commentary" or "exposition" of any primary or secondary text in ancient or medieval Indian literature. Common in Sanskrit literature, Bhashyas are also found in other Indian languages such as Tamil. Bhashyas are found in various fields, ranging from the Upanishads and the Sutras of Hindu schools of philosophy, to ancient medicine and music.

The Indian tradition typically followed certain guidelines in preparing a Bhashya. These commentaries give meaning of words, particularly when they are about condensed aphoristic Sutras, supplementing the interpreted meaning with additional information on the subjects. A traditional Bhasya would, like modern scholarship, name the earlier texts (cite) and often include quotes from previous authors. The author of the Bhasya would also provide verification, acceptance or rejection of the text as interpreted, with reasons, and usually include a conclusion. The title of a commentary work sometimes has the title of the text commented on, with the suffix "-Bhashya".

Among the earliest known Bhashya are the Maha-bhashya of Patanjali from the 2nd century BCE, and Sabara Bhashya of the Mimamsa school of Hinduism, dated to have been likely composed between 100 BCE and 200 CE, but no later than the 5th century. An example of Buddhist literature Bhashya is Vasubandhu's Abhidharmakośa-Bhāṣya.

== Etymology ==
The term bhashya literally means "speaking, talking, any work in the current, vernacular speech". The term also refers to, states Monier-Williams, any "explanatory work, exposition, explanation, commentary" that brings to light something else. A bhashyakrit is the author, and these words are related to the root bhash which means "speak about, describe, declare, tell". (Cf. the productive ending -ology in English, which derives from the Greek verb λεγῶ (legō), meaning "speak".) Bhashya is known as urai in the Tamil literary tradition, which literally means "prose".

== Types of commentary ==
A sūtra (literally a "thread") is the foundational or base text of an Indian philosophical tradition, such as the Nyāyasūtra, Vaiśeṣikadarśana, Vedāntasūtra, Yogasutra, and the Mīmāṃsāsūtra. Other disciplines of knowledge too have their respective sūtra texts, such as the grammar text the Aṣṭādhyāyī, which contains four thousand aphorisms spread across eight chapters. In general a sūtra text is a compilation of short, formula-like, sequentially arranged statements that are designed to be easily memorized yet are often difficult to understand without further explanation. The compactness of the aphorisms and the completeness of the discipline’s teachings are prioritized over clarity, which is achieved through subsequent commentaries. Their brevity anticipates if not necessitates exegesis in the commentarial form.

A bhāṣya is a distinctive genre of philosophical commentary that unpacks and weaves together the compact aphorisms, which helps the reader see the interrelationship between the sūtras. The bhāṣya presents the sūtra text as a coherent whole by identifying its broader purport and structuring its individual aphorisms into groups that are thematically consistent and interconnected. The organizational structure of a bhāṣya, however, does not reorder the arrangement of aphorisms of the root text. Were it to do so, it could lose its status as a bhāṣya commentary. The interpretation of individual aphorisms occurs within the framework established by revealing the sūtra text’s internal consistency and structure. At the level of each aphorism, a bhāṣya specifies its meaning using terminology that closely follows the original while also specifying its own technical vocabulary. Within the layers of commentary that constitute a commentarial tradition, the bhāṣya is the primary level of analysis, sitting between the root text (sūtra) and subsequent sub-commentaries (vārttika). A few examples of bhāṣya include the Brahmasūtrabhāṣya of Madhvācārya, Śārīrakabhāṣya of Śaṅkarācārya, Gītābhāṣya and Śrībhāṣya of Rāmānuja, and Vyākaraṇa-mahābhāṣya by Patañjali.

A vārttika is a layer of sub-commentary that explains but also critically engages the bhāṣya by defending, revising, and adjudicating its interpretation of the aphorisms of the sūtra. When a single sutra text has multiple bhāṣya commentaries, a vārttika brings stability to a philosophical system by adjudicating among the internal rival interpretations. In addition to dealing with matters internal to a philosophical tradition, a vārttika also defends against opponents who are external to that tradition. The term vārttika can also apply to compilation of verses called kārikās. A kārikā text orders and collates doctrinal concepts and teachings from across a larger body of literature. These works themselves become the subject of commentaries authored by the original author of the kārikā or later commentators.

A nibandha is a higher-level commentarial genre that is typically positioned after foundational sūtras, bhāṣyas, and vārttikas. Similar to a vārttika, its principal role in a philosophical tradition is the continued revision and adjustment of earlier interpretations towards an equilibrium. This form of sub-commentary constitutes a development in a commentarial tradition by bringing rival interpretations of the same system as well as rival systems into dialogue. For instance, in the grammatical tradition while the nibandha elucidates the complex terminology of a prior commentary it also addresses the divergent interpretations of earlier scholars. Nibandhas can also come in the form of compendiums of quotations drawn from a variety of texts. These quotations are thematically organized and may have sparse commentary.

== Tamil literary tradition ==
Following the Sanskrit literary tradition, commentaries to literary works remain one of the most important and telling aspects of the Tamil literary tradition. Commentaries to ancient Tamil works have been written since the medieval period and continue to be written in the modern era. The exegesis to the work Iraiyanar Kalaviyal is considered the first commentary in the Tamil literary tradition, which is the first prosaic commentary to a composition in verse. This marked the beginning of commentaries in Tamil literary tradition, which reached it peak between the 10th and 15th centuries.

Many ancient Tamil works continue to remain in comprehension chiefly due to exegesis or commentaries written on them. The most famous examples of such works are the Tolkappiyam and the Tirukkural, with the latter remaining the most reviewed work in the Tamil literature. According to K. Mohanraj, as of 2013, beginning with Manakkudavar from the Medieval era, there were at least 497 Tamil commentaries on the Tirukkural written by 382 scholars of whom at least 277 scholars have written commentaries for the entire work.

Nakkeerar, Ilampooranar, Senavaraiyar, Paerasiriyar, Deivachilaiyar, Nacchinarkkiniyar, Manakkudavar, Paridhiyar, Parimelalhagar, Kalladar, and Adiyarkku Nallar are some of the most celebrated commentators in the history of Tamil literature, all of whose works are praised on par with the original works to which they wrote exegeses.

== See also ==
- Works of Madhvacharya
- Works of Adi Shankara
- Ten medieval commentators
