= Karl Harrington Potter =

American writer, academic and Indologist (1927–2022)

- Born: August 19, 1927; Oakland, California, U.S.
- Died: January 11, 2022 (aged 94); Lake Forest Park, Washington
- Occupation: Indologist
- Parent(s): George Reuben Potter, Mabel Harrington
- Awards: Padma Shri (2011)

Karl Harrington Potter (August 19, 1927 – January 11, 2022) was an American-born writer, academic, and Indologist, from the University of Washington. He studied at the University of California, as well as Harvard University and is known for his writings on Indian philosophy.

Potter has served as a professor, of the department of Philosophy and South Asian Studies at the University of Washington. He has been called an eminent scholar by his peers.

He is credited with a number of books on the topic. The Government of India honored Potter in 2011 with the fourth highest civilian award of Padma Shri. Potter died in January 2022, at the age of 94.

== Selected works ==
Monographs

- Harold G. Coward, Karl H. Potter (2008). The Philosophy of the Grammarians. Delhi: Motilal Banarsidass. ISBN 9788120803077.
- Karl H. Potter (1965). Presuppositions of India's Philosophies. Prentice Hall of India.

Bibliography

- BIBLIOGRAPHY OF INDIAN PHILOSOPHIES - published online after three printed editions as volume I of the Encyclopedia of Indian Philosophies (see below): 1st edition 1970; 2nd revised 1983; 3rd revised 1995), updated at least twice a year since 1996, new interface of the website since March 2000, during the last years a joint effort with a group of assistants. Last edition 15.04.2020 Internet Archive copy.

General editor

- Potter, Karl H., ed. (1970–2019). Encyclopedia of Indian Philosophies. Vol. 1–25. Delhi: Motilal Banarsidass., now (2023) distributed by Exotic India Art. See the full list of volumes at Potter's website, up till August 2019, and at the publisher's website.

== See also ==
- Indian philosophy
- Indology
