= Alathur Kilar =

Ancient Indian poet

Alathur Kilar, originally pronounced Ālathur Kiḻhār (Tamil: ஆலத்தூர் கிழார்), was a Tamil poet of Sangam period. He has authored seven poetries in the Sangam literature, including five in Purananuru and two in Kurunthogai.

== Contribution to the Sangam literature ==
Alathur Kilar has written seven Sangam verses in all. This includes verses 34, 36, 69, 225, and 324 in Purananuru and verses 112 and 350 in Kurunthogai. The three Chola emperors mentioned by Alathur Kilar include Setchnni Nalankilli, Cholan Nalankilli, and Cholan Kulamuttratthu Thunjiya Killi Valavan.

Alathur Kilar cites the Tirukkural in verse 34 of the Purananuru, calling it 'Aram' which later became one of the Kural's traditional names.

== Biography ==
Alathur Kilar hailed from Aathur in Sonadu (Chola Kingdom) and belonged to the Vellalar caste. He was known for providing moral advice to the rulers. He has sung in praise of King Killi Valavan.

== See also ==
- Purananuru
- Kurunthogai
- List of Sangam poets
