= Thiru Narayana Iyengar =

Indian literary scholar

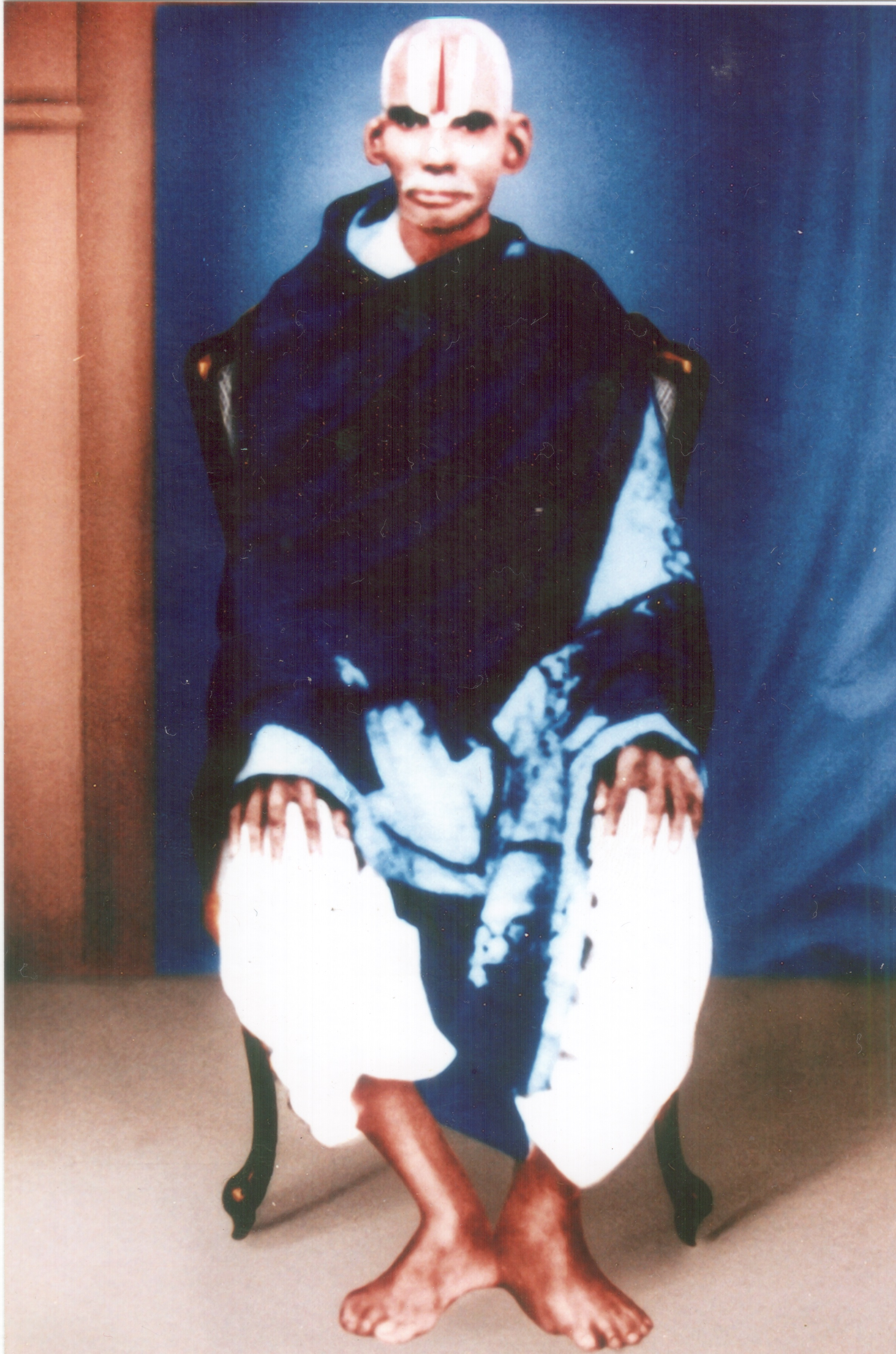
- Thiru Narayana Iyengar
- Born: 31 October 1861; EthirkOtai, India
- Died: 29 July 1947 (aged 85)

Maha vidhwan Thirumaaligai Appan Narayana Iyengar (31 October 1861 – 1947) was an influential Tamil and Sanskrit scholar whose lifelong dedication to Tamil literature and education made a lasting impact on the cultural landscape of Tamil Nadu. Born to Thirumaaligai Appan Iyengar and Shenkamalavalli Ammal in EthirkOtai, near Srivilliputhur, Narayana Iyengar showed a profound aptitude for languages from a young age. He mastered both Tamil and Sanskrit, alongside disciplines like tarka sastra (logic), astrology, and medicine. His literary contributions included translating classical Sanskrit texts into Tamil and publishing original works that deepened the appreciation of Tamil grammar, literature, history, and religious studies.

Narayana Iyengar played a foundational role in the Madurai Tamil Sangam, established in 1901, where he served as an educator, administrator, and editor. His most notable editorial work was with Senthamizh magazine, which became an important medium for scholarly research and cultural discourse. Through Senthamizh, he shared insights on Tamil and Sanskrit literature and encouraged a balanced examination of differing perspectives. His articulate, fearless commentary on subjects ranging from linguistic nuances to cultural history earned him acclaim from readers and the literary community.

He received multiple awards including a golden armlet, medal, and shawl from the Madras government and recognition from prominent universities.

== Initial years and education ==
Iyengar learnt Sanskrit literature and grammar from Pandalkudi Venkatachariar, tarka sastra from Samaacharyar and Vaishnava literature including Naalayira Divya Prabhandham from Sidhadikkaadu Srinivasachariar. He also learnt the Shaiva literature like Sivagyana bodham, Sivagyaana Sidhiyaar, Thevaaram, Tiruvasakam from Palanikumara Thambiraan of Thiruvaavaduthurai Aadheenam.

He, along with Paandithurai Thevar, zamindar of Paalavanatham did their residential education with Sadavadhaanam Muthuswamy Iyengar, father of Mu Raghava Iyengar. During his education, his versatility in both Sanskrit and Tamil literature, his knowledge of Astrology, medicine and tarka sastra impressed Paandithurai Thevar so much that he made him his official poet.

== Literary work ==
Iyengar translated the Sanskrit literature "Jaathakachandrika", a text on horoscope study in to Tamil (venpa yaappu) quartet poems on the request of the zamindar. This work was published and released by the zamindar in his court.

Iyengar also helped Paandithurai Thevar in publishing the Panoorthirattu.

When Paandithurai Thevar established the Madurai Tamil Sangam on 14 September 1901, he assigned Iyengar management responsibilities in the Sangam for which he moved to Madurai.

Iyengar was in the management team of the Madurai Tamil Sangam since its inception. He was the first head of the Senthamil College institution and performed it for 45 years. Apart from that he also performed other functions – administrator, editor of Senthamizh magazine. Thiru Narayana Iyengar was the editor of the Senthamizh monthly from 1911. until his death in 1947.

It was during this period as Senthamizh editor that he did many research works in Tamil and Sanskrit literature and published his works in the monthly journal. His articles in the Senthamizh magazine on literature - Tamil and Sanskrit, grammar, tarka sastra, history and religion were informative to the readers. His expertise in these topics, his unbiased position in assessing the different points of view, his fearlessness to state the facts were well commended by the readers of Senthamizh. He published many such works in the magazine and which were later published as books.

In 1938, Iyengar wrote a paper titled Valmiki and Tamil in Senthamizh monthly, which analysed Maharishi Valmiki's relationship with Tamil and whether Tamil could have been the spoken language throughout India during the Ramayana times.

His work Bharathazhwan Vaibhavam in the Senthamizh magazine was discussed in the Tamil literary circles. In that work, the detailed meaning given by Thiru Narayana Iyengar for the Kamban song that begins "Vanthethire thozhuthaanai" were refuted by Naavalar Somasundara Bharathiar. Thiru Narayana Iyengar's reply to that rebuttal with detailed grammatical explanations and poetic nuances are even today a feast for the lovers of the Tamil language. He published both Naavalar's objections and his explanations in the Senthamizh magazine.

He was in the education advisory committee of the Madras University, Annamalai University and the Yaazhpaana Arya Dravida Bhasha Abiviruthi Sangam. He was dedicated to Madurai Tamil Sangam and loyal to Paandithurai Thevar that he did not take up opportunities that came to him from other universities.

During the 80th birthday celebrations of Ue. Ve. Swaminatha Iyer, Iyengar requested him to write his autobiography and that encouraged Ue. Ve. Swaminatha Iyer to write "என் சரித்திரம்". When Ue. Ve. Swaminatha Iyer retired from Annamalai University, Annamalai Chettiar requested Thiru Narayana Iyengar to join the university. Although more remunerative and in spite of Ue. Ve. Swaminatha Iyer requesting him, Thiru Narayana Iyengar turned it down since he derived very high satisfaction from his work at the Madurai Tamil Sangam. In his reply to Thiru Narayana Iyengar, Swaminatha Iyer quoted Thiruvalluvar's kural - "வேண்டாமை அன்ன விழுச்செல்வம்" and said that he was the one with the greatest asset – needlessness.

Here below are what some of the various Tamil literati had to say about him:

Naavalar Somasundara Bharathiar said of him – "நிரம்பிய இருமொழிக் கல்வியும் வரம்பளந்த அளவை நூலறிவும், நுண்மதியும், நடுவுநிலை திறம்பாத உளச் செம்மையும், சாந்த சீலமும் வாய்ந்த பெரியார் - a respectable elder with complete dual language knowledge, boundless knowledge of the books, refined sharp intelligence, unwavering judiciousness and equanimous".

"இருமொழிப் பயிற்சியிலும், இலக்கணம் தர்க்கம் ஆகிய துறைகளிலும் அவரைப் போன்ற வித்வான்களைப் பார்க்க முடியாது - It is difficult to see an expert as good as him in dual language knowledge, grammar and logical reasoning" said the head of the department of Tamil in Madras University, Rao Sahib Thiru S. Vaiyapuri Pillai.

"ஆசிரியர் செந்தமிழ் இதழில் வெளியிட்ட பொருளுரைகள் தமிழ்மொழி வளர்ச்சிக்கு இன்றியமையாதன - Senthamizh editor’s essays with detailed meanings were an important contribution for the growth of the Tamil language" so said Sunnaakam A Kumaarasaami Pulavar.

Mu Raghava Iyengar of the Madurai Tamil Sangam had said "நூற்றுக் கணக்கான மாணவர்களுக்கு தமிழறிவூட்டி அக்கல்வித் துறையைப் பரவச் செய்து தமிழக குலபதியாக விளங்கியவர் - Thiru Narayana Iyengar instilled the knowledge of Tamil literature to hundreds of students, was responsible for the growth of Tamil literature and can be called the leader".

== Recognition ==
1896 – During Queen Victoria Jubilee celebrations he won accolades for his contributions to Tamil from the Deputy-Collector Rajaramaiyya

1922 Jan 13 Madras government awarded him a golden armlet, gold medal and shawl from the Prince of Wales for his literary eminence in Tamil

1934 for the 33rd anniversary of Madurai Tamil Sangam, awarded the cash prize and shawl for his contributions to Tamil Sangam by the Governor of Chennai Muhamad Usman Sahib Bahadur

1945 - Ruler of Sethu Shanmuga Raajeswara Naaganaatha Sethupathi awarded the gold medal and silk shawl

== Papers and books ==
Listed below are some of the papers and books written by Thiru Narayana Iyengar. Apart from this he has submitted over 50 papers on grammar, literature, tarka sastra, astrology, history and religion

- Tamil Jaathakachandrikai - In 1897, Thiru Narayana Iyengar's translation of Jaathakachandrika to Tamil quartet poems was acclaimed by the ruler of Sethu, Bhaskara Sethupathi.
- Nyayap Prevesa Manimegalai
- Anumaana Vilakkam – Detailed meaning for Manimegali 29th story - Thavathiram Poondu Tharumam Ketta Kaathai
- Vaanmeegarum Tamizhum – first published in Senthamizh monthly in the year 1938. Later published as book along with other papers.
- Bharathazhwan Vaibhavam - initially published in Senthamizh, was later released as a book named Padiyil Gunathu Bharathanambi.
- Anda Kola Viruthi – published in Senthamizh in 1931. Later published as part of Vaanmeegarum Tamizhum book.
- Amritha Ranjani – first published in Senthamizh in 1939. Later published as part of Vaanmeegarum Tamizhum book.
- Pazhamozhi Naanooru Urai - Detailed meaning for the first 200 of Pazhamozhi Naanooru
- Paandiam – a common script and short-hand for many languages including Tamil
