= Raghava Iyengar =

Raghava Iyengar may refer to:

- M. Raghava Iyengar (1878–1960), Tamil scholar and researcher of Tamil literature, better known for the compilation of the Perunthogai
- R. Raghava Iyengar (1870–1946), critical Tamil scholar and creative interpreter of literature
