= V. O. Chidambaram Pillai =

Indian freedom fighter (1872–1919)

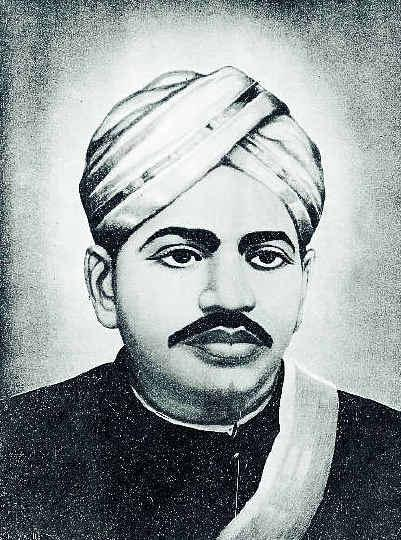
- Chidambaram in 1919
- Born: Vazuvur Olaganathan Chidambaram Pillai; 5 September 1872; Ottapidaram, Tirunelveli district, Madras Presidency, British India (present-day Thoothukudi district, Tamil Nadu, India)
- Died: 18 November 1936 (aged 64); Thoothukudi, British India
- Other names: Kappal Ottiya Tamilzhan, Chekkilutta Chemmal
- Organization: Swadeshi Steam Navigation Company
- Political party: Indian National Congress
- Movement: Indian Independence Movement
- Spouse: Meenakshi
- Children: 4 sons, 4 daughters

Valliappan Olaganathan Chidambaram Pillai (5 September 1872 - 18 November 1936) was an Indian freedom fighter, lawyer, businessman, Tamil scholar, and politician. He founded the Swadeshi Steam Navigation Company in 1906 to compete against the monopoly of the British India Steam Navigation Company (BISNC). He launched the first indigenous Indian shipping service between Tuticorin in British India and Colombo in Ceylon. Once a member of the Indian National Congress, he was later charged with sedition by the British government and sentenced to life imprisonment, and his barrister license was revoked. He is known by the epithet Kappalottiya Tamizhan ("Tamil helmsman"). Tuticorin Port Trust, one of India's thirteen major ports, is named after him.

== Early life ==
V. O. Chidambaram Pillai was born into a Tamil Hindu family in Ottapidaram, Tirunelveli District to Olaganathan Pillai and Paramayee Ammal. When Chidambaram was six years old, he learned Tamil from teacher Veeraperumal Annavi. He heard stories about Shiva from his grandmother and stories from the Ramayana from his grandfather. He heard stories from Mahabharatha told by Allikulam Subramanya Pillai etc. In his childhood, he learned horse riding, silambattam, archery, sword fighting and played kabaddi, swimming, stilt walking, wrestling and chess.

He learned English from a Taluk officer named Krishnan Iyyengar in the evenings. When Iyyengar was transferred, Chidambaram Pillai's father built a school for him and appointed Aramvalarthanatha Pillai from Ettayapuram as the English teacher. The school was run by a priest at Pudhiamuthur. At fourteen, Chidambaram Pillai went to Thoothukudi to continue his studies. He studied at CEOA High School and Caldwell High School and in Thoothukudi at the Hindu College High School, Tirunelveli.

Chidambaram Pillai worked as Taluk office clerk for some time before his father sent him to Tiruchirappalli to study law. He passed his pleadership exam in 1894, returning to Ottapidaram to become a pleader in 1895.

In Madras, Chidambaram Pillai met Swami Ramakrishnananda, a saint who belonged to Swami Vivekananda Ashram (monastery), who advised him to serve the nation.

== Political life ==
=== Background ===
In the 1890s and 1900s India's independence movement and the Swadeshi movement, which confirms the politic parcel initiated by Bal Gangadhar Tilak and Lala Lajpat Rai of the Indian National Congress (INC), were at their peak. From 1892 Chidambaram Pillai was influenced by Tilak Maharaj and became his disciple. Along with Subramanya Siva and Subramanya Bharathi, he became a prominent spokesperson for the cause in the Madras Presidency. Following the partition of Bengal in 1905, Chidambaram entered politics, joining the Indian National Congress and taking a hardliner stance. He also presided at the Salem District Congress session.

=== Companies and institutions ===
Chidambaram Pillai established many institutions like Yuvanesh Prachar Sabha, Dharmasanga Nesavu Salai, National Godown, Madras Agro-Industrial Society ltd and Desabimana Sangam. In response to the British India Steam Navigation Company's trade monopoly, Chidambaram started an Indian-owned shipping company. He registered the Swadeshi Steam Navigation Company in October 1906. The capital of the company was ten lakh rupees. The number of shares was 40,000 and the face value of each share was Rs. 25/-. Any Asian could become a shareholder. The director of the company was Pandi Thurai Thevar, Zamindar of Palavanatham and the founder of "Madurai Tamil Sangam". Haji Pakkir Mohammed Rowther Sait paid ₹ 200,000 and purchased 8000 shares of the company, becoming its secretary.

VOC travelled across Tamil Nadu to raise funds, and the Vanniyar Kshatriya community people contributed nearly 75% of the total funds raised. Many of their names are recorded in the old donor lists (as in the documents shown)

In the beginning, the Company owned no ships, instead leasing them from Shawline Steamers Company. The B.I.S.N.C. pressured Shawline Steamers to cancel the lease; in response, Chidambaram Pillai leased a single large freighter from Sri Lanka. Realizing the need for the Swadeshi Steam Navigation Company to own its own vessels, Chidambaram Pillai travelled around India selling shares in the company to raise capital. He vowed, "I will come back with ships. Otherwise I will perish in the sea". He managed to secure sufficient funds to purchase the company's first ship, the S.S. Gallia; shortly afterwards, they were able to acquire the S.S. Lavo from France. In response to the new competition, the B.I.S.N.C. reduced the fare per trip to Re.1 (16 annas) per head. The S.S.N.C responded by offering a fare of Re.0.5 (8 Annas). The British company went further by offering a free trip to the passengers with a free umbrella; however, nationalist sentiment meant that the free service was underused. The B.I.S.N.C. attempted to buy out Chidambaram, but he refused the deal. The ships commenced regular service between Tuticorin and Colombo (Sri Lanka) against opposition from British traders and the Imperial Government.Later he sold S.S Gallia ship.

=== Coral Mill strike ===
On 23 February 1908 Chidambaram Pillai gave a speech at Thoothukudi, encouraging the workers at Coral Mill (now part of Madura Coats) to protest against their low wages and harsh working conditions. Four days later, the workers of the Coral Mill went on strike led by Subramanya Siva and Chidambaram himself. Their demands included incremental earnings, weekly holidays and other leave facilities.

Chidambaram ensured the strike was widely publicised, and it quickly gained popular support. On 6 March the head clerk Subramanya Pillai met Chidambaram and said that the management was ready to concede their demands. Chidambaram went with 50 workers and met the managers, who agreed to increase the wages, to reduce the working hours and to give leave on Sundays. The workers went back after a nine-day strike. The outcome of the strike encouraged the workers of other European companies, who also gained increased wages and better treatment. Sri Aurobindo appreciated Chidambaram and Siva for the unequalled skill and courage with which the fight was conducted in his Vande Mataram daily on 13 March 1908.

== Arrest and imprisonment ==
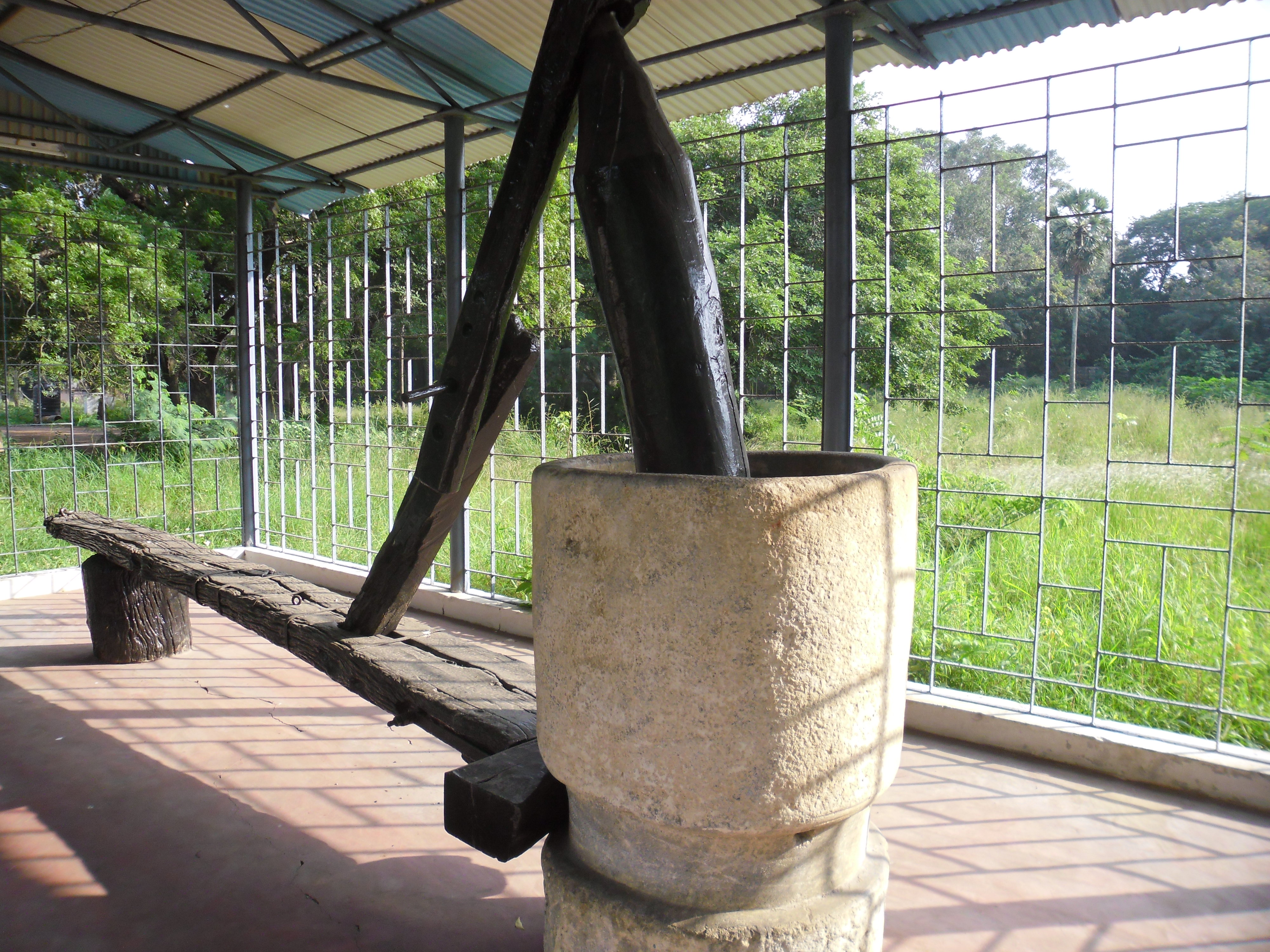
V. O. C. yoked oil press kept now at Gandhi Mandapam Guindy

By 1908, Chidambaram's political involvement drew the attention of the British. Hearing of his intention to speak at a rally celebrating the release of Bengali leader Bipin Chandra Pal, Winch, a British official invited Chidambaram to meet him in Thirunelveli with his political comrade Subramanya Siva. At the meeting, Winch expressed concern about Chidambaram's activities and asked him to give assurances that he would not participate in any political revolt. Chidambaram refused to accept his conditions, so he and Siva were arrested on 12 March 1908. The arrest was followed by widespread protest. In Thirunelveli shops, schools and colleges were closed in protest, and rioting broke out. The Thirunelveli municipal office, post offices, police stations and municipal courts were attacked. A general strike was declared in Thoothukudi, which was the first political strike in India. Public meetings and processions were held, and four people were killed by the police.

Although his supporters were able to raise sufficient funds for bail, Chidambaram refused to leave the jail without the release of Siva and his other comrades. Subramanya Bharathi and Subramanya Siva also appeared in the court for questioning for the case instituted against Chidambaram. He was charged under sections 123-A and 153-A of the Indian Penal Code for speaking against the British and giving shelter to Siva. Chidambaram refused to take part in the proceedings. He was charged with sedition, and a sentence of two life imprisonments (in effect forty years) was imposed. He was confined in the Central Prison, Coimbatore from 9 July 1908 to 1 December 1910. The judgement was widely condemned in the popular press, with even the British Statesmen magazine claiming that it was unjust. Chidambaram appealed the sentence in High Court, gaining a reduced punishment of four years imprisonment and six years in exile. An appeal to the Privy Council led to a further reduction in sentence.

Chidambaram was interned in Coimbatore and Kannanoor jail. He was not treated as a political prisoner, nor was the sentence de facto of simple imprisonment; rather, he was treated as a convict sentenced to life imprisonment and required to do hard labour, which caused his health to suffer. Historian and Tamil scholar R. A. Padmanabhan later noted in his works that Chidambaram was "yoked (in place of bulls) to the oil press like an animal and made to work it in the cruel hot sun....". From prison Chidambaram continued correspondence, maintaining a steady stream of legal petitions. He was finally released on 12 December 1912. To his dismay, the Swadeshi Steam Navigation Company had already been liquidated in 1911, and the ships were auctioned to their competitors. The company's first ship, the SS Gallia, was sold to the British Shipping Company.

== Later life and death ==
Upon Chidambaram's release he was not permitted to return to Tirunelveli district. With his law license stripped from him, he moved to Chennai with his wife and two young sons. There he ran a provisions store and a kerosene store. Chidambaram had a long correspondence with Gandhi, not yet Mahatma, from 1915 to 1920. In 1915, when Gandhi visited Chennai (Madras then), both had met. Some people in South Africa of Indian origin had collected money to help Chidambaram and transmitted the amount through Gandhi. However, Chidambaram did not receive the money. He had some lengthy correspondence with Gandhi on the subject. In one instance Gandhi wrote a postcard to Chidambaram in Tamil with his own hand. Chidambaram was delighted on seeing the postcard and, for a moment, forgot about the money dispute. However, on 4 February 1916, Chidamabaram wrote to a friend, "Rs. 347-12-0 has come from Sriman Gandhi."

In 1920, Chidambaram quit the Indian National Congress, citing ideological differences with Mahatma Gandhi. He focused his efforts on establishing labor unions in Madras and on writing. After moving to Coimbatore, Chidambaram worked as a bank manager. Dissatisfied with the income, he petitioned the court, seeking permission to practice law again. Judge E.H. Wallace gave permission to restore Chidambaram's pleadership license; to show his gratitude Chidambaram named his last son Valacewaran. Chidambaram moved to Kovilpatti and practiced as a lawyer. He rejoined the Congress Party in 1927 and presided over the third political conference held at Salem. He said that he wanted to join Congress again because he noticed a remarkable change in the policies of Congress and was happy to note that the policies of which he did not approve were withdrawn one by one. However, after the Salem conference Chidambaram again severed his contact with Congress. In 1929 he moved to Thoothukudi, where he spent his time writing and publishing Tamil books. By 1935, he had written commentary on the first book of the Tirukkural (Book of Virtue) and was published under a different title. However, it was only in 2008 that the complete work of his commentary on the Kural was published. Chidambaram Pillai spent his final years in poverty. He died on 18 November 1936 at the Tuticorin office of the Indian National Congress.

== Literary works ==
- Meyyaram 1914
- Meyyarivu 1915
- Anthology 1915
- Autobiography 1946
- Many articles in various magazines
- Translation works
- Literary notes (commentary) on the Tirukkural
- Thirukural with literary notes of Manakudavar 1917
- Tolkappiam with literary notes of Ilampooranar 1928

== Legacy and honours ==
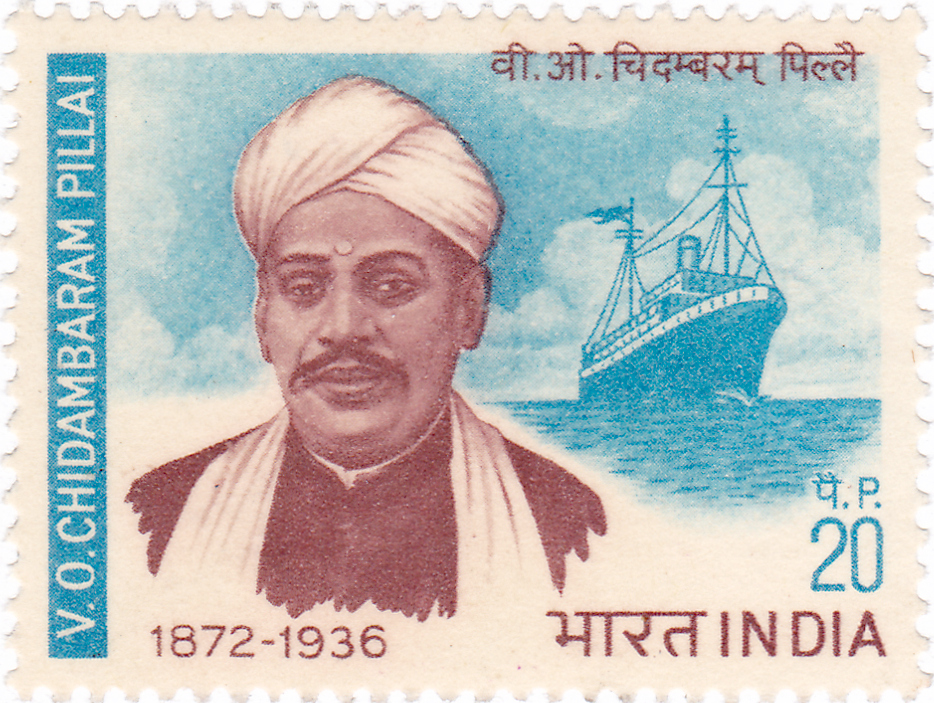
Chidambaram Pillai on a 1972 stamp of India

Posthumously, Chidambaram is known by the titles Kappalottiya Thamizhan ("the Tamizhan who drove the ship") and "Chekkiluththa Chemmal" ("a great man who pulled the oil press in jail for the sake of his people"). His ship is situated near Marina Beach. The Indian Posts & Telegraphs department of India issued a special postage stamp on 5 September 1972, on the occasion of his birth centenary.

Many statues of Chidambaram have been commissioned; some of the more notable are:

- At the entrance of the Congress committee office, Royapettah, Chennai (1939).
- At the arch of Palayamkottai, Tirunelveli.
- At Marina beach, Chennai. (unveiled at the World Tamil Conference).
- At the port, Thoothukudi. (unveiled by Indira Gandhi, the former Prime Minister).
- At the Entrance of Kattu Paramakudi (V.O.C. Mahal) unveiled at 18 November 2012. By Tamil Nadu V.O.C Peravai, Ramanathapuram District.
- At Simmakkal, Madurai (unveiled by M. G. Ramachandran, former chief minister of Tamil Nadu).
- At the commemorative building of V.O.C., Tirunelveli. (unveiled by J. Jayalalithaa, former chief minister of Tamil Nadu).
- The Tuticorin Port was rechristened as V.O. Chidambaranar Port Trust by Manmohan Singh, former Prime Minister and G.K. Vasan, Union Minister of Shipping. In 2022, it was again renamed as V.O. Chidambaranar Port Authority by Government of India.
- At Theni district (Chinnamanur center place) & Bodi & (Chilamarathupatti-Bus stand) & (Putthipuram-Bus stand) & Vadipatti by the Saiva Vellalar Community to which V.O Chidambaram Pillai Belongs.

M.P. Sivagnanam, popularly known as Ma. Po. Si., wrote a biography of Chidambaram titled Kappalottiya Tamizhan. Later Chidambaram was remembered as 'Kappalottiya Thamizhan'. Ma. Po. Si. brought the fame of Chidambaram to the limelight. Books written by Ma. Po. Si. on V.O. Chidambaram Pillai are Kappalottiya Thamizhan (1944), Kappalottiya Chidambaranar (1972) and Thalapathy Chidambaranar (1950). R.A. Padmanabhan, popularly known as Bharathi Aringnyar. He has written an authenticated biography of V.O. Chidambaram Pillai in English printed and published by the National Book Trust in 1977. R A P gives a greater insight into the life of Chidambaram Pillai focussing Chidambaram Pillai's achievement as the pioneer of Swadeshi Shipping company.

In 1961 Kannada film director B.R. Panthalu made a film of Chidambaram's life titled Kappalottiya Thamizhan. Chidambaram was portrayed by Sivaji Ganesan, Subramanya Siva by T. K. Shanmugam and Subramanya Barathi by S. V. Subbaiah. The story of this movie is based on Ma. Po. Si.'s biography 'Kappalottiya Tamizhan'. In Bharathi (2000 film) interactions between V.O.Chidambaram Pillai and Subramania Bharathiyar and life chronicles of V O Chidambaram Pillai is available. In RRR film, he was featured and honoured in a song named Ettara Jenda (Koelae).
