= Pandithurai Thevar =

Founder of fourth tamil sangam and King of Palavanatham

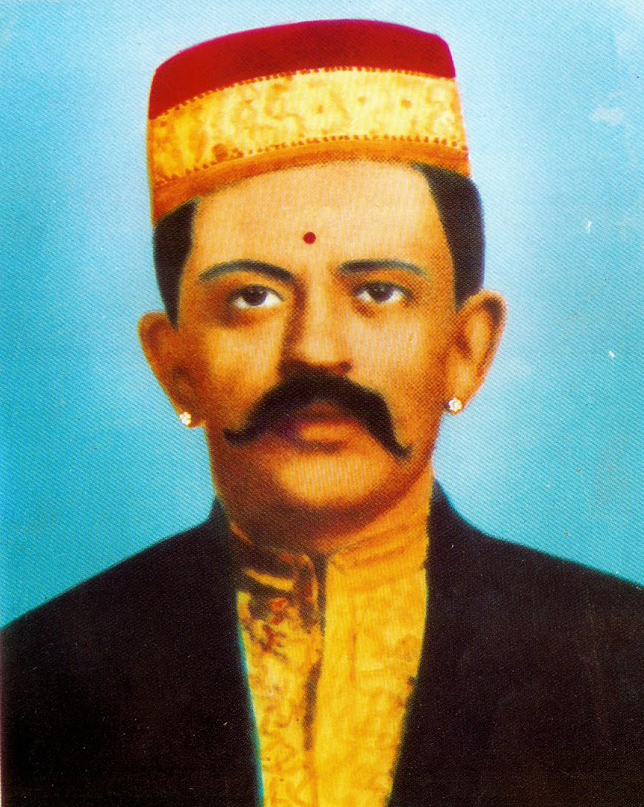
- Born: Ukkira Pandian; March 21, 1867; Ramanathapuram
- Died: December 2, 1911 (aged 44); Ramanathapuram
- Occupation: Zameendhar
- Known for: Philanthropy
- Notable work: Establishing Madurai 4th Tamil Sangam

Vallal Pon Pandithurai Thevar (21 March 1867 – 2 December 1911), born Ukkira Pandian, also known as Pandi Durai Thevar, was the Zamindar of Palavanatham, Virudhunagar District in Tamil Nadu, India. A scholar and poet belonging to the royal house of the Sethupathis of Ramanathapuram, Pandithurai Thevar contributed greatly to the revival of the Tamil language by establishing the Fourth Tamil sangam in Madurai, restoring rare Tamil texts, and becoming a patron of Tamil-language scholarship. He published the magazine Senthamizh as part of the Fourth Tamil sangam.

== Early life ==
Pandithurai Thevar was born on 21 March 1867. He was the third son of Ponnusamy Thevar, a minister at Ramanathapuram Samasthanam. Pandithurai Thevar's father died when he was a child. He was taught Tamil by the Tamil poet, Azhagar Raju, and English by the lawyer, Venkateshwara Shastri, and he became fluent in both languages. During this younger age, he and his cousin, Bhaskara Sethupathi, were brought up together at Ramanathapuram Samasthanam.

When he reached adulthood, he inherited the properties managed until then by the agent, Seshadri Iyengar, including Palavanatham Zameen.

== Patron of Tamil development ==
Pandithurai Thevar invited Tamil scholar, U.V.Swaminatha Iyer, a collector and printer of rare Tamil books, to Ramanathapuram, and vowed support for him in printing Manimekalai and Purapporul venbaamaalai. He published Thevarathalaimurai Pathippu with the help of his teacher, Gnanasambandha Pillai (Ramasamy Pillai), and Sivagnana Swamigal Prabandha Thirattu. In objection to anti-Shaivism, he published books on Shaivism through Sabapathy Navalar. He aided Chunnakam Kumaraswamypulavar in publishing Thandiyalankaram. Kumaraswamypulavar thanks Pandithurai Thevar for his patronage in the book, Saivamanjari, which was compiled by Pandithurai Thevar.

== Establishment of the Fourth Tamil Sangam ==
When Pandithurai Thevar came to Madurai in 1901, he was disappointed to find that Tamil books such as Thirukkural and Parimelazhagar Urai were not available, even at the place where the third Tamil Sangam was established. On 24 May 1901, he held a consultative meeting with eminent poets at Madurai Sethupathi High School to establish the Fourth Tamil Sangam in Madurai.

On 14 September 1901, Pandithurai Thevar established the Fourth Madurai Tamil Sangam in Madurai at Sethupathi High school in the presence of Baskara Sethupathy, Zamindar of Ramnad, and all the Tamil scholars from Tamil Nadu and Sri Lanka. He assigned the management responsibilities of the Tamil Sangam to Thiru Narayana Iyengar, a scholar of Tamil and Sanskrit who he knew from residential education from their childhood. The Sangam also included a college ("Sethupathi Senthamizh Kalaasaalai"), library ("Pandiyan Puthaga Saalai") and literary research centre ("Nool Aaraaichisaalai").

A monthly collection of essays in Tamil by well-known poets was also launched, entitled Senthamizh, which has since seen its centenary celebration. The magazine helped publish work in Tamil by poets including U. V. Swaminatha Iyer, Thiru Narayana Iyengar, R. Raghava Iyengar, M. Raghava Iyengar, Ettayapuram Sami Iyengar, Parithimar Kalaignar, Arangasamy Iyengar, and C. W. Thamotharampillai.

When the creation of an academic department for Tamil language at Madras University was blocked due to objections, Pandithurai Thevar's Sangam created many Tamil Pundits through its education and examination systems at its college. Parithimar Kalaignar considered Tamil to be a classical language and did his best to retain this status at Madras University through the Fourth Tamil Sangam. Pandithurai Thevar and Bhaskara Sethupathi supported him in this cause.

== Indigenous Steam Navigation Company ==
Pandithurai Thevar provided financial assistance and also recruited share-holders for the Swadeshi Steam Navigation Company, started by V.O. Chidambaram Pillai in 1906, which operated steamer services between Tuticorin and Colombo, to break the British monopoly. He then became chairman of the company.

== Accolades ==
Pandithurai Thevar was praised by Bhaskara Sethupathi, the Zamindar of Ramanathapuram, as 'Marava chief of the West', as his Palavanatham zameen was present to the west of Ramanathapuram zameen. The first edition of Manimekalai, printed in 1898, acknowledged Pandithurai Thevar's instrumental help to U.V. Swaminatha Iyer to bring it out in print.

== Literary works ==
Pandithurai Thevar himself composed poetry works such as Sivagnanapuram Murugan Kavadich Sindhu, Rettai Manimalai (written for his guru, Sivagnana Swamigal), Raja Rajeshwari Padhikam, and many others.
