= Kumaraswamy Pulavar =

Sri Lankan revivalist

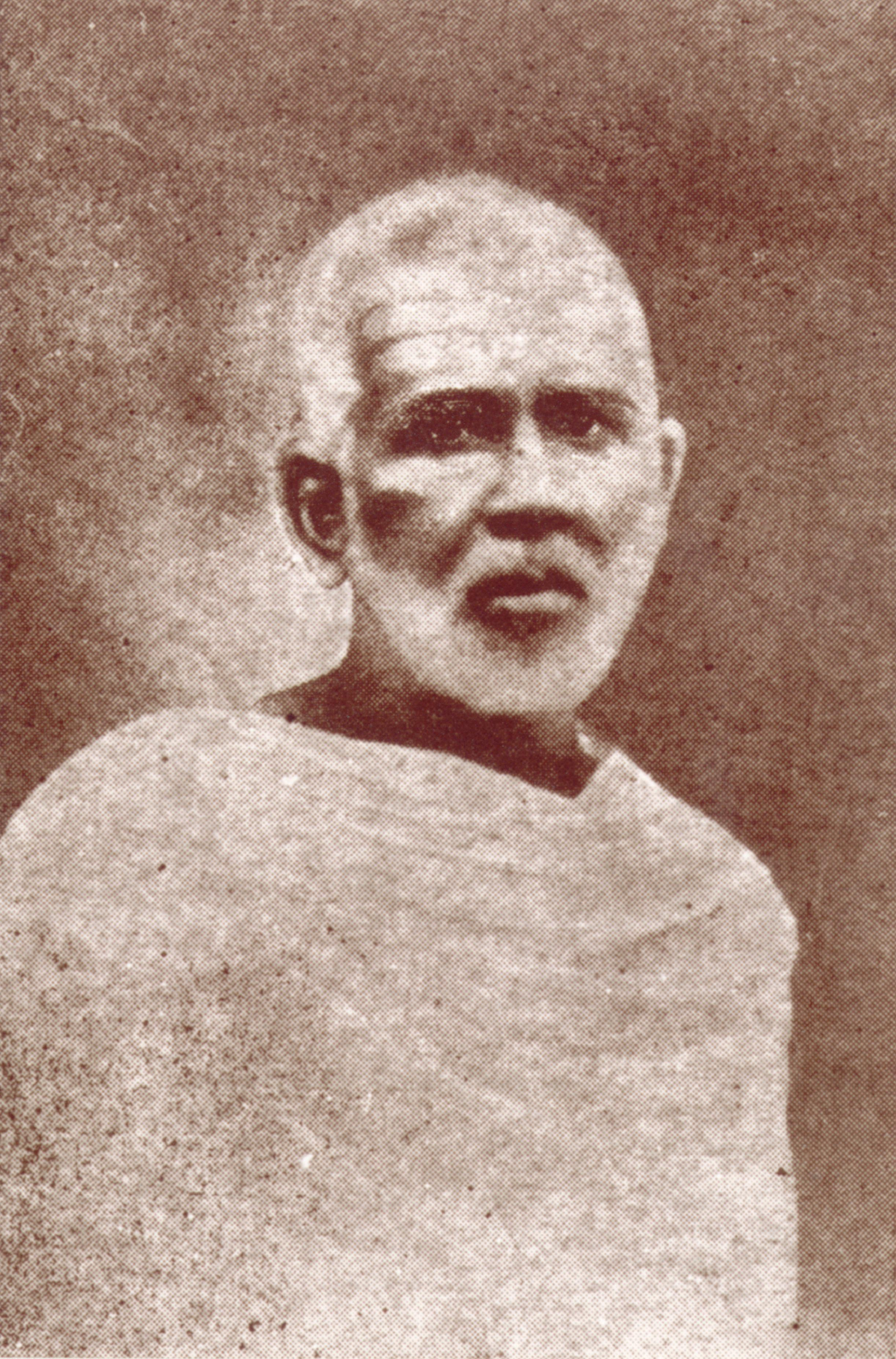
- Born: Kumaraswamy; January 18, 1854; Chunnakam, Jaffna District, Sri Lanka
- Died: 1922 (aged 67–68); Jaffna, Sri Lanka
- Education: Tamil Pandithar
- Occupations: Poet; scholar
- Employer: Madurai Tamil Sangam
- Known for: Hindu reformer

Chunnakam Kumaraswamy Pulavar (Tamil: சுன்னாகம் குமாரசாமிப்புலவர்) was a well-known Sri Lankan Tamil scholar and poet from Maylani village in Chunnakam township in Jaffna Peninsula in the British-held Ceylon now known as Sri Lanka. He lived from 1854 to 1922. He along with other activists were instrumental in the revival of native traditions in Sri Lanka that had been long dormant during the previous 400 years of colonial rule by various European powers.

== Early life ==
Chunnakam Kumaraswamy Pulavar was born to Ampalavanar and Chithamparammai on January 18, 1854 as only son, among two daughters. When the Pulavar was 5, he started studying Tamil under Namasivaya Desikar and also started studying at Mallakam English School. At the age of 8 he started learning Tamil literature from Murukasu Panditar. Encouraged by Arumuga Navalar, a friend of his great uncle Muttukumara Kavirajar, Pulavar started learning Sanskrit literature from a close relative, Naganatha Panditar from the age of 9. In 1878 Rao Bhahadur C. W. Thamotharampillai asked the Pulavar to teach at his Saivapracasa Tamil School at Elalai, and two years later Pulavar was promoted to be the principal of the school. He was there for 22 years and earned high recognition for his hard work. During this time Pulavar wrote a number of research papers on ancient Tamil literature. He also wrote and published several articles on greatness of the Hindu Saiva religion to counter the insulting articles published by Christian clergy at that time in Jaffna and Tamil Nadu. In 1892 he married Chinnachiammai, daughter of Mylvahanam of Kantharodai / Uduvil.

== Contributions ==
When in 1896 Pulavar became a member of a committee, which was formed to oversee the reconstruction of the Naguleswaram temple in Kīrimalai which was destroyed by the Portuguese colonials in 1621, he also composed the Oonjel songs on Lord Shiva of Naguleswaram temple. In 1900 Jaffna Tamil Sangam was established by Kailasa Pillai, with the Pulavar as the chief examiner and member of the scholarly panel. In 1902 Pulavar was appointed as the head master of Arumuga Navalar’s Saivapirahasa Tamil School in Vannarpannai. Eventually he gained much recognition for his eminence. In 1902 Madurai Tamil Sangam was established in Tamil Nadu by Zemeendar Panditurai Devar and Ramanathapuram King Rajarajeswara Sethupathi. Pulavar was one of the first Tamil scholars invited to be examiner of the panel of Tamil scholars, a position he held for the next 20 years.

Scholarly contributions

Pulavar contributed research articles regularly to journals and composed many poetic compositions and works in prose among which some are

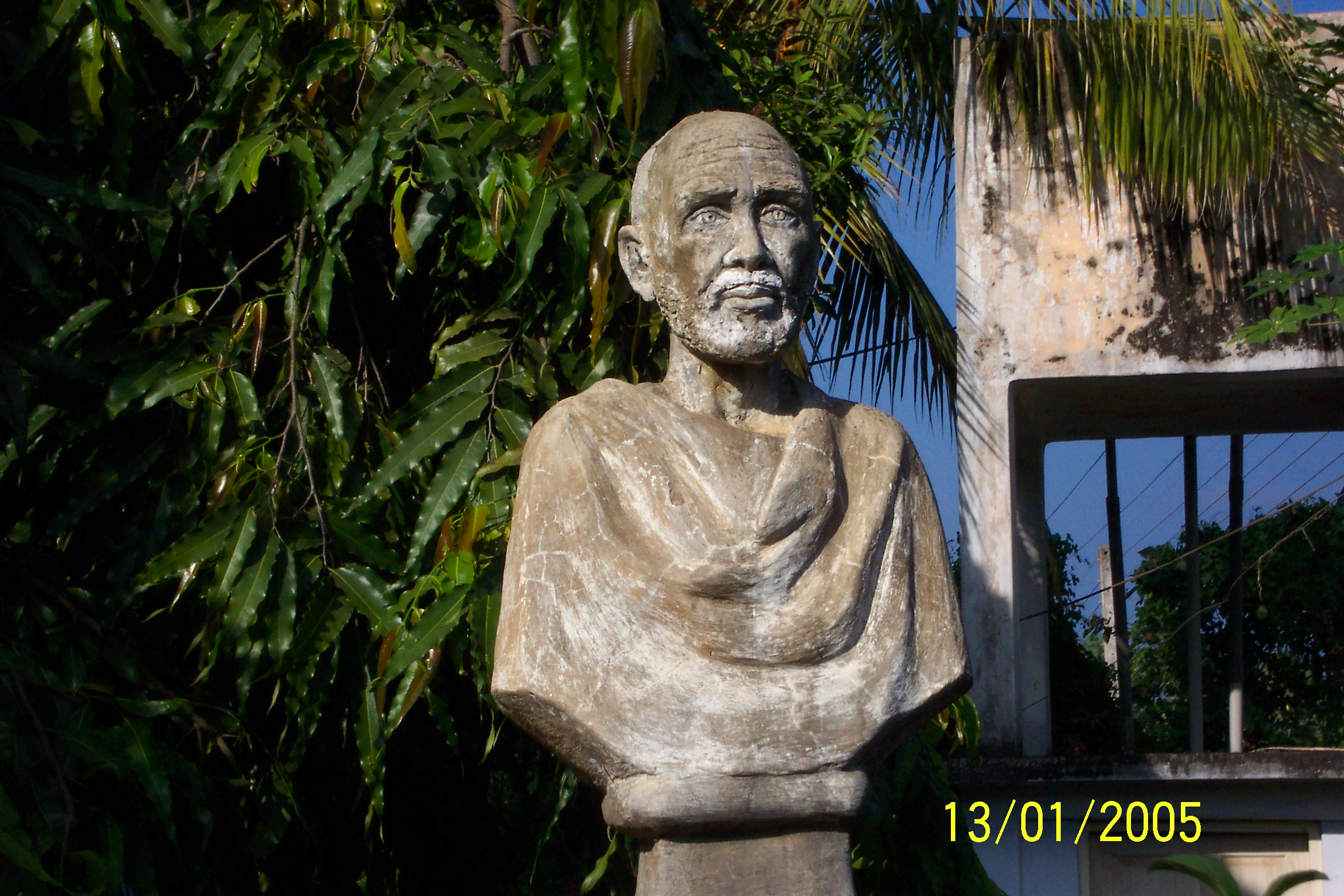
Statue of Kumaraswamy Pulavar in Chunnakam Library

Tamil Pulavar Charithram (History of Tamil poets), Ilakkiya Sol Aharathy (Dictionary of classical terms), Neethi Neri Vilakkam (An explanation of the judicial process), Megathootha Karikai and Raguvamsa Charitha Amirtham (Both religious works). Besides the above, he also published some of the Tamil classics, with his explanatory notes and comments. He was also a Sanskrit scholar. Pulavar died due to illness on March 9, 1922. He had two sons Ambalavanapillai & Muttukumaraswamipillai, who were also able scholars, and a daughter Visalachiyammai. Kumaraswamy pulavar is well respected by people of Jaffna and Tamils all over for his scholarly attributes.

== See also ==
Other social reformers from Sri Lanka of the same period

- Anagarika Dharmapala
- Arumuga Navalar
- Swami Vipulananda
