= Vedagiri Mudaliar =

- Born: Tamil Nadu, India
- Died: 1852
- Occupation: Tamil scholar
- Known for: Publishing the Tirukkural with commentaries for the first time
- Children: Arumuga Mudaliar, Kandasamy Mudaliar

Vedagiri Mudaliar was a Tamil scholar best known for his work on publishing the Tamil classical work of the Tirukkural language, along with commentaries for the first time.

== Biography ==
Vedagiri Mudaliar hailed from Kalathur, originally called Ponvilaintha Kalathur, a small town near Chengalpattu in Tamil Nadu. Mudaliar taught Tamil in Madurai Tamil Sangam. He also established a printing press exclusively for the purpose of printing Tamil materials.

In 1850, Mudaliar published the entire Kural text with commentaries for the first time in history. Though the work had been published with commentaries a few years earlier by Mahalinga Iyer, that work only had the first 24 chapters from the classical text. A revised edition of the publication was released posthumously in 1853, by Mudaliar's sons, Arumuga Mudaliar and Kandasamy Mudaliar. Mudaliar's work has the distinction of being used by Ramalinga Adigal, who launched a movement to teach the classic to the masses. Mudaliar had also written commentaries on the Naladiar, another ancient didactic work similar to the Kural text.

Mudaliar died in 1852. Mudaliar's 1850 work was republished after 168 years, in 2018 by Sivalayam J. Mohan.

== See also ==
- Tirukkural
