= Swadeshi Steam Navigation Company =

One of India's first indigenous shipping companies

The Swadeshi Steam Navigation Company (SSNC) was one of the first indigenous Indian shipping companies set up during the Indian independence movement. It was started in 1906 by V. O. Chidambaram Pillai to compete against the monopoly of the British India Steam Navigation Company (BISNC). It sailed ships between Tuticorin and Colombo until it was liquidated in 1911.

== Background ==
In the early 20th century, the British India Steam Navigation Company (BISNC) had a monopoly over trade in the Indian Ocean region. The merchants of Tuticorin, a port city in South India, decided to break the monopoly. They hired a ship from the Shawline Steam Company to run between Tuticorin and Colombo, the capital of Ceylon. After the intervention of the British Raj, the hired company withdrew the lending.

During this time, V. O. Chidambaram Pillai, a pleader from Tuticorin who was involved in the Swadeshi movement, which argued for self-reliance, started a navigation company as an act of political and financial opposition to the British.

== Company ==
Pillai registered the Swadeshi Steam Navigation Company on 16 October 1906 with a capital of bought ₹10 lakh (equivalent to ₹33 crore or US$3.4 million in 2023) from the issue of 40,000 shares. Pillai formed the company not for profit but for ideals of nationalism. Any individuals in Asia were eligible to hold the shares. Haji Mohammed Rowther Sait, Landlord and Merchant bought ₹2 lakh (equivalent to ₹6.6 crore or US$690,000 in 2023) indian rupees and purchased largest 8000 shares of company and Rowther became secretary of the company. Pandithurai Thevar, the zamindar of Palavanatham, bought ₹1.5 lakh (equivalent to ₹5.0 crore or US$520,000 in 2023) of shares by selling Pambur, a village in his zamin; Thevar became the president and Pillai became the assistant secretary. The objective of the company was to run a ship between Tuticorin and Colombo and also to train Asians in navigation and ship building. Pillai toured throughout India to raise money for the company, while poet Subramanya Bharathi wrote essays about its importance. The first ship, the SS Galia, was purchased from France with the help of Bal Gangadhar Tilak and Aurobindo Ghose and arrived in Tuticorin in 1907. The ship travelled between Tuticorin and Colombo and could carry 1300 passengers and 40,000 bags of cargo. The ship bore a flag with the slogan "Vande mataram". It would later be joined by another French ship, the SS Lavo.

A trade war broke out between the SSNC and BISNC; when the BISNC reduced the fare to one rupee, Pillai reduced the fare to 50 paisa. The BISNC then gave free umbrellas to passengers. Due to nationalist sentiment, the SSNC received support from traders and passengers even when the BISNC offered free service. The BISNC, with the help of the British Raj, suppressed the activities of the SSNC by denying it the place and time schedule in the port and delaying the medical and customs clearance of SSNC passengers. In 1908, Pillai was part of a group that planned to celebrate the release of independence advocate Bipin Chandra Pal from prison as Swarajya (self-rule) day. In response, on 12 March 1908, the British arrested Subramania Siva and Pillai on charges of sedition for organising meetings against the government. Pillai was sentenced to two terms of life imprisonment (40 years). During his jail term, the British Raj further suppressed the activities of the company, and shareholders withdrew following harassment from the authorities. The SSNC liquidated in 1911, and one of the ships was sold to its rival British company.

== Impact ==
On 17 June 1911, the collector of Tinnevely District, Robert Ashe, was shot dead at Maniyachchi Junction railway station by Vanchinathan, a member of a secret society. During the trial, it was revealed that Vanchinathan considered Ashe to be responsible for the suppression of the SSNC.

In Tamil Nadu, Pillai is remembered as Kapallotiyya Tamilan (the Tamilan who sailed ships). The Government of India changed the name of the Tuticorin Port Trust to the V.O. Chidambaranar Port Trust to honour Pillai's contribution towards the Indian independence movement.
