= Meenakshi Sundaram Pillai =

Tamil poet and scholar

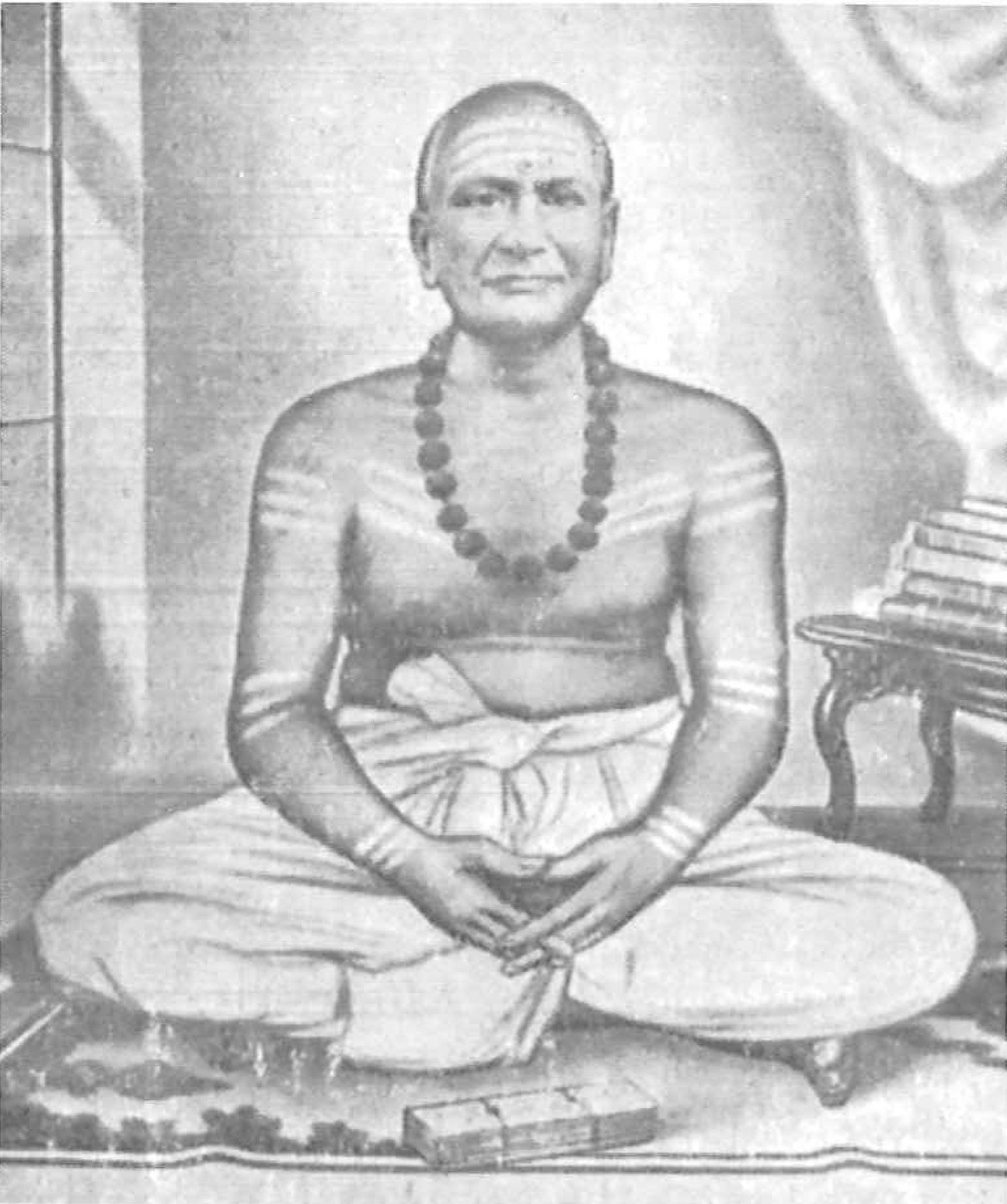

Personal life
- Born: 6 April 1815 Tiruchirapalli; Tamil Nadu; India
- Died: 1 February 1876 (aged 60)
- Notable work: Thala Varalaru
- Honors: Tamil Poet

Religious life
- Religion: Hinduism
- Philosophy: Saiva Siddhanta

Meenakshi Sundaram Pillai or Mahavidhvan Meenakshisundaram Pillai (Tamil: மீனாட்சிசுந்தரம் பிள்ளை) was a Tamil scholar and teacher of U. V. Swaminatha Iyer, a Tamil scholar and researcher who was instrumental in bringing many long-forgotten works of classical Tamil literature to light. Pillai's important contribution is in the form of temple history called Thala Varalaru for ninety temples in Tamil Nadu. He was born in Trichy and went on to associate himself with Thiruvaduthurai Adheenam. He was an ardent devotee of Sivaperuman and a Tamil teacher.

Some of his notable works are Prabada Tirattu, Kanthimathiammai Pillai Tamil, Sri Mangalambigai Pillai Tamil, Perunthipirattiyar Pillai Tamil and Thiruvidaikazhi Murugar Pillai Tamil.

== Biography ==
Meenakshi Sundaram Pillai was born on 6 April 1815 to Chidambram Pillai and Annathachi Ammayar in Somarasanpettai in Trichy. He born in a Tamil Vellalar family. He got his early education from his father who taught him Tamil literature and also Mathematics. He then went on to learn Tamil from Velayutha Munivar in Mounamadam in Rockfort. He also learnt from other people such as Velur Subramanya Desikar, Sri Sivakkira Yogi Mutt head Ambalavana Munivar, Keezhavelur Subramanya Pandaram, Kanchipuram Sababathi Muthaliyar and 'Thandiyalangar' Paradesiyar. He married Kaveriachi in his fifteenth year. He got Sivadikshai on his 21st year Thirisirapuram Setti Pandrathiya. He went on to associate himself with Thiruvaduthurai Adheenam where he started teaching and publishing his works.

Mahamahopadhyaya Dr. U. V. Swaminatha Iyer compiled Pilla's biography in Tamil, which was translated into English by Sridharam K. Guruswamy. as "A Poet's Poet" (Maha Vidhwan Sri Meenakshisundaram Pillai of Tiruchrappalli). This book of 129 pages was first published in the year 1976 by Mahamahopadhyaya Dr. U. V. Swaminatha Iyer Library, Madras, now known as Chennai.

In addition, we get to know the poetic brilliance and the unwavering Tamil bhakti of Poet Meenakshi Sundaram Pillai, and the high regard the Tamil-speaking world idolized him, by reading the first 300 pages of the Autobiography of Dr. U. Ve. Swaminatha Iyer, En Saritham. It was to the credit of the Saivite Thiruvaavaduthurai mutt and the then Sannidhanam HH. Subramania Desikar that Poet Meenakshi Sundaram Pillai could sustain despite the severe monetary challenges faced. Another aspect is of the Guru Sishya relation that moves one to tears and shows the dark contrast to the low level, education of our current times have degraded to. A disciple (in the form of U. Ve. Sa) like a calf that has strayed out for a few days, longing for its mother, and The Poet as the searching and longing mother yearning to nourish the calf (his disciple and take care of his Tamil hunger as well as the real hunger). He died at Thiruvaaduthurai after ailing for sometime, with his two foremost disciples at the deathbed, Saverinatha Pillai massaging his feet and U. V. Swaminatha Iyer reciting from the Thiruvaasagam.

He was an ardent Saivite, but held Kamban and his Ramayanam in the loftiest pedestal. It would be fair to say that in the last 200 years, Pillai has contributed possibly the largest corpus to Tamil poetic literature than any other poet, and by his teaching and through his students brought out the greatness of Tamil literature to the public at large and beyond. Remember all of this literature are aligned to the Yaappu and Ani Illakanam (Poetic grammar) and much before the advent of the new style of poem writing (Pudhu Kavidhai). He was an ardent teacher and ensured noon meals for all his pupils.

== Literary works ==
He began his career as a Tamil teacher in Mayiladuthurai and went on to train many students in the craft of Tamil literature. One of his first publications under his own name was Akhilanda Nayaki Pillai Tamil, written in 1842. He is remembered for his contribution to Tamil studies as well as Saiva Agamas (Rules of Saivites). The celebrated Tamil scholar U. V. Swaminatha Iyer, known for his discovery of the Sangam classics, became his student at the age of 17. Meenakshi Sundaram Pillai, who left behind him a treasure of Tamil palm leaf manuscripts, died in 1876. He led a poor person's life but is respected as one among the greats who served to Tamil language. Due to poverty, he had to ghost write works like Suta Samhita and Kuchelopakyaanam.

Along with the institution of Tamil literature came an increased specialization of roles. Whereas poetic and musical composition were often combined in the creation of dramatic and poetic works, the dual role of Kirthana(musical text) composer and erudite poet was becoming unusual in the 19th century. U. V. Swaminatha Iyer reports the contempt of his teacher, Pillai, for poets who composed musical works; music was thought to be a distraction from the more important aspects of grammar, poetics and mastery of traditional commentaries.

== Notable works ==
Sthala Puranas constitute one of the 96 minor literary genres of Tamil, which gained prominence after the 16th century and came to be recognised as an important literary text for studying temples in the context of socio-economic milieu. Pillai is said to have composed 90 Sthalapuranas (history of ancient temples) about various temples and imparted puranams to his pupils. His major works are listed below.

- Prabanda Tirattu
- Kanthimathiammai Pillai Tamil
- Sri Mangalambigai Pillai Tamil
- Perunthipirattiyar Pillai Tamil
- Thiruvidaikazhi Murugar Pillai Tamil
- Prabada Tirattu - Paguthi 10 - Sri Ambalavanathesikar Pillai Tamil
- Vaatpokki Kalambagam
- Thiruvavauthurai Atheenathuk Guru Parambarai Agaval
- Prabantha Thirattu - Paguthi 11 - Sri Ambalavana Thesigar Kalambagam
- Thiruvidaimaruthur Ula
- Prabantha Thirattu - Paguthi 13 - Seekazhi Kovai
- Prabantha Thirattu - Paguthi 14 - Thirupanjeelithirupandathi
- Prabantha Thirattu - Paguthi 15 - Thiruthillaiyamagavanthathi
- Prabantha Thirattu - Paguthi 16 - Thuraisaiyamagavanthathi
- Prabantha Thirattu - Paguthi 17 - Thirukudanthai Thiripandathi
- Prabantha Thirattu - Paguthi 18 - Thiruvidaimaruthur Thiripanthathi
- Prabantha Thirattu - Paguthi 19 - Palaivana Pathitranthathi
- Prabantha Thirattu - Paguthi 20 - Thirvooraipathiranthathi
- Prabantha Thirattu - Paguthi 26 - Thiruchiramalaiyamagavanthathi
- Prabantha Thirattu - Paguthi 27 - Thirupanjeeli thiripanthathi
- Prabantha Thirattu - Paguthi 28 - Kalaichaichidambareswarar Malai
- Prabantha Thirattu - Paguthi 29 - Agilanda Nayagi Malai
- Prabantha Thirattu - Paguthi 30 - Subramaniya Thesika Malai
- Prabantha Thirattu - Paguthi 31 - Sri Sachithananda Thesikar Malai
- Thiruvanaikka Agilandanayagi Pillai Tamil
- Prabantha Thirattu - Paguthi 2
- Seizhkizhar Pillai Tamil
- Thirugnana Sambandar Aaanantha Kalippu, Thirukkarkudi malai
- Prabantha Thirattu - Paguthi 32 - Thesikar Nenjuvidu Thoothu
- Prabantha Thirattu - Paguthi 33
