= U. V. Swaminatha Iyer =

Tamil scholar

Mahamahopadhyaya U. V. Swaminatha Iyer
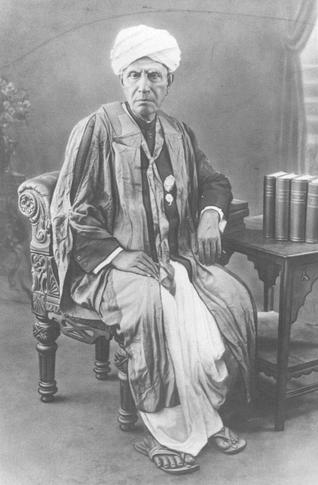
- Born: 19 February 1855; Sooriyamoolai, Thanjavur Maratha Kingdom, British India (now in Thanjavur District, Tamil Nadu, India)
- Died: 28 April 1942 (aged 87); Tirukalukundram, Chingleput District, Madras Province, British India (now in Chengalpattu District, Tamil Nadu, India)
- Occupations: scholar, researcher

Uthamadhanapuram Venkatasubbaiyer Swaminatha Iyer (19 February 1855 – 28 April 1942) was a Tamil scholar and researcher who was instrumental in bringing many long-forgotten works of classical Tamil literature to light. His singular efforts over five decades brought to light major literary works in Tamil and contributed vastly to the enrichment of its literary heritage. Iyer published over 90 books in his lifetime, on a variety of matters connected to classical Tamil literature, and collected over 3,000 paper manuscripts, palm-leaf manuscripts and notes of various kinds.

He is affectionately called Tamil Thatha (literally, "Tamil grandfather").

== Early life ==
Swaminatha Iyer was born into a Tamil-speaking Brahmin family on 19 February 1855 in the village of Suriyamoolai and grew up in Uthamadhanapuram, near Kumbakonam in Tamil Nadu. In his early years, he studied Tiruvilaiyadal Puranam, Kamba Ramayanam, Tamil Grammar - Nanool. He married in 1868. Between 1870 and 1875, he trained under the great Tamil scholar Meenakshi Sundaram Pillai, gaining expertise in various Tamil medieval texts.

== Academic career ==
In 1880, Swaminatha Iyer became a Tamil professor at the Government Arts College, Kumbakonam. He also taught at the Thiruvaduthurai Saiva mutt. During his tenure at the college, Swaminatha Iyer met Salem Ramaswami Mudaliar, a civil munsif who had been recently transferred to Kumbakonam. Mudaliar gave Iyer a text named Chintamani and wanted to learn about it. This not only transformed Iyer's life but also marked the beginning of his lifelong mission to rediscover, edit, and publish ancient Tamil literary works, thereby preserving and revitalizing Tamil literature for future generations.

Later in 1903, he became a Tamil teacher in Pachaiyappa's College in Chennai and continued until his retirement in 1919.

== Ancient Tamil Literary recovery ==
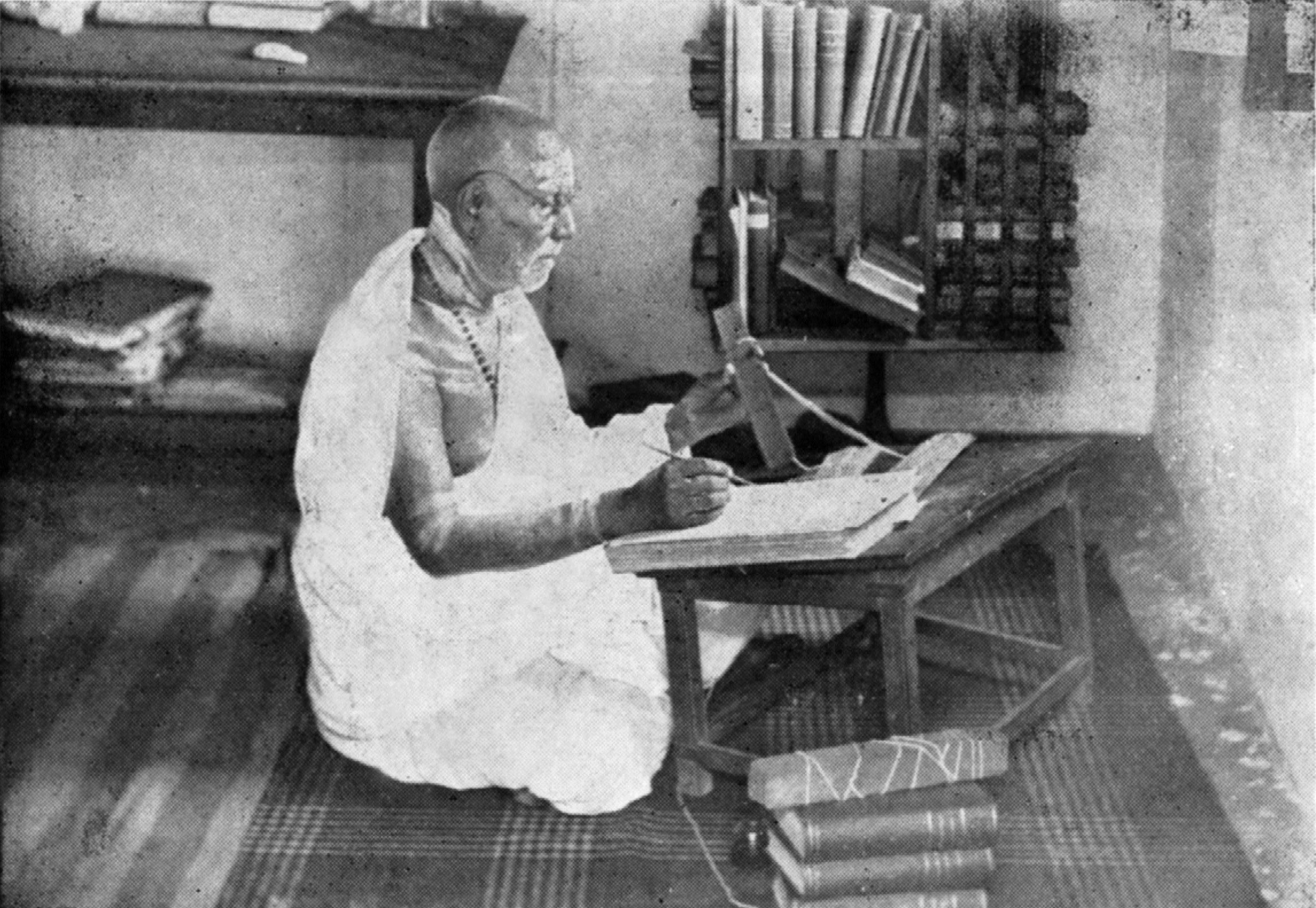
Iyer studying palm leaf manuscripts

When Iyer read the opening verses of the Chintamani, he found the stanzas praised a god, as was customary, but intriguingly did not mention any specific deity. The text also contained Nachinarkiniyar's commentary. To interpret the epic accurately, Iyer realized he needed a deeper understanding of Jain traditions. He sought the guidance of Chandranatha Chettiar and other Tamil Jains and studied the epic with them regularly. He also encountered discrepancies between two existing copies of the text. Determined to resolve these inconsistencies, he searched for palm-leaf manuscripts across Tamil Nadu and meticulously compared them.

During this time, Thamodharam Pillai visited Iyer and showed his interest in publishing Chintamani. Pillai had experience publishing few morks in Chennai and had contacts for sponsorship. However, Pillai had not looked into Chinthamani, while Iyer worked extensively on it. Iyer continued his work and after seven years of dedicated effort, in 1887, he published the complete works of Jeevaka Chintamani along with his notes.

Swaminatha Iyer then turned his attention to Soolamani, another Jain text, with the intention of editing and publishing it. Although he worked on the text, he did not publish as Thamodharampillai was working on it.

He subsequently focused on Pattupattu, but initially, he did not have access to the actual poems. Instead, he obtained scattered and disordered notes related to the text. Determined to reconstruct the Pattupattu, Iyer traveled extensively across Tamil Nadu, collecting materials related to the work. In 1888, after thorough research and editing, he successfully published Pattupattu in 1889.

In 1890, while searching for copies of Silapathikaaram, Iyer discovered additional Pattupattu manuscripts, which he used to produce a revised edition of the text. Alongside the Silapathikaram manuscripts, he also acquired Arumbada Urai (commentaries) and notes by Adiyaarku Nallar. He was particularly impressed by the rich content in Silapathikaram related to music and drama. To enhance his understanding of the musical references, he delved into texts such as Kachapuda Venba, Thaala Samudram, and Suddhantha Prasadham. During his travels, Iyer also discovered Purananuru manuscripts at the home of a Kavirayar in Mithilaipatti. Over the course of visiting more than fifty locations, he meticulously gathered materials and insights. Finally, in 1891, he published Silapathikaram.

In 1892, Swaminatha Iyer began his research on Purananuru, an anthology composed by various poets. Some of these poets had also authored other works, prompting Iyer to study those poems to better understand their writing styles and themes. Many Purananuru poems were incomplete, with missing introductions, middle sections, or concluding parts. While researching, Iyer observed that some Purananuru poems were referenced in Tholkappiyam's Porul Athikaaram, which provided additional insights. He also gathered historical and geographical information related to figures like Athiyamaan and Karikal Valavan and locations such as Venni. In 1894, after extensive research and reconstruction, Iyer published Purananuru. Along with the text, he included notes on various countries, regions, mountains, rivers, and historical figures mentioned in the poems, offering a broader context to readers.

Swaminatha Iyer next turned his attention to Manimekalai. He first learned that it was a Buddhist text from Rangachari, a professor at Kumbakonam College. He observed that most Buddhist texts were written in Pali or English, with very few available in Tamil. Unlike the Jains he had previously consulted, Iyer could not find Tamil Buddhists in Tamil Nadu to assist him. Instead, Rangachari, who had studied English translations of Buddhist texts, discussed them extensively with Iyer. In addition, Iyer sought the guidance of notable scholars such as G.U. Pope and Colombo Kumarasamy Mudaliar, from whom he collected information. After meticulously referring to 59 Tamil texts and 29 texts in North Indian languages, Iyer published Manimekalai in 1898, marking another milestone in his efforts to revive ancient Tamil literature.

He continued his research on ancient Tamil literature editing, adding fine and detailed commentaries and publishing:

- Ainkurunuru in 1903 and revised it in 1920
- Patiṟṟuppattu in 1904
- Paripaatal in 1918
- Purananuru first in 1923 and revised in 1935 and 1936
- Kuṟuntokai in 1937

Swaminatha Iyer's research and publications were primarily supported by Salem Ramaswami Mudaliar, Pandithurai Thevar, Zamindhar of Palavanatham, and few others.

== Contributions to Tamil music ==
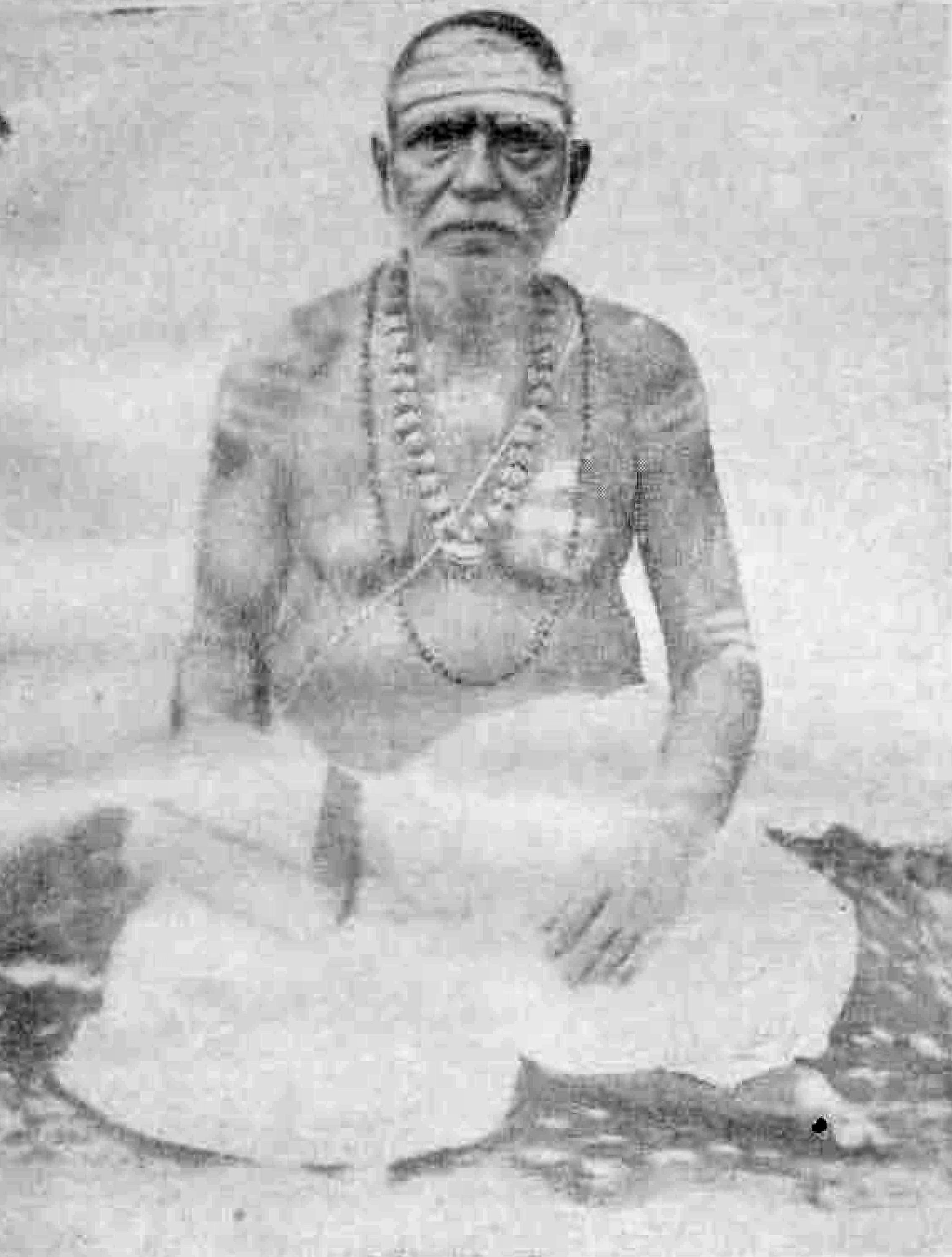
Swaminatha Ayyar

Another significant contribution made by Swaminatha Iyer is in the realm of Tamil music. Until Swaminatha Iyer published the Cilappatikaram, Pattupattu and Ettuthokai, music was a grey area in Tamil research. During the previous four centuries, Telugu and Sanskrit dominated the music scene in Tamil Nadu in the absence of any valuable information on Tamil music. Swaminatha Iyer's publications threw light on the presence of Tamil music in the earlier centuries and paved the way for serious research on the subject. As the son of a famous musician of his time, Swaminatha Iyer learnt music from Gopalakrishna Bharathi, a musical exponent and the author of Nandan Sarithiram.

== His autobiography ==
Swaminatha Iyer published his autobiography, En Sarithiram, serialised in the Tamil weekly Ananda Vikatan, from January 1940 to May 1942. It was later published as a book in 1950. Running into 762 pages, the book is an excellent account of the life and times of villages, especially in the Thanjavur district in the late 19th century. The Tamil is simple and peppered with many observations on people as well as descriptions of school life, life in monasteries (Mutts). The book also reveals the enormous perseverance of U V Swaminatha Iyer in his quest to master Tamil and save manuscripts.

== Style of writing ==
Dr. U. V. Swaminatha Iyer showed deep respect for the original texts, preserving the language as it was used in the classical and medieval periods, including Sanskritized terms where they naturally appeared. He reflected the historical and cultural context of the texts he worked on, bridging Tamil and Sanskrit traditions without bias. His focus was on preserving and explaining the literary, historical, and cultural essence of Tamil texts, irrespective of their linguistic influences.

The discovery of the oldest Tamil literary works will always be connected with the name of a research scholar in literature and a great cultural historian, Dr. U. V. Swaminatha Iyer, who edited, towards the end of the nineteenth and the beginning of the 20th centuries, in quick succession a considerable number of classical works of Tamil literature. He thus became one of the foremost representatives of the so-called Tamil Renaissance.

- Kamil Zvelebil

In the recovery and publishing of ancient Tamil literature, a noted man of Tamil letters has written, Arumuga Navalar broke the ground and Damodharam Pillai built the walls. But the person who put on the roof and made the work into a temple was U. V. Swaminatha Iyer.

== Legacy and honours ==
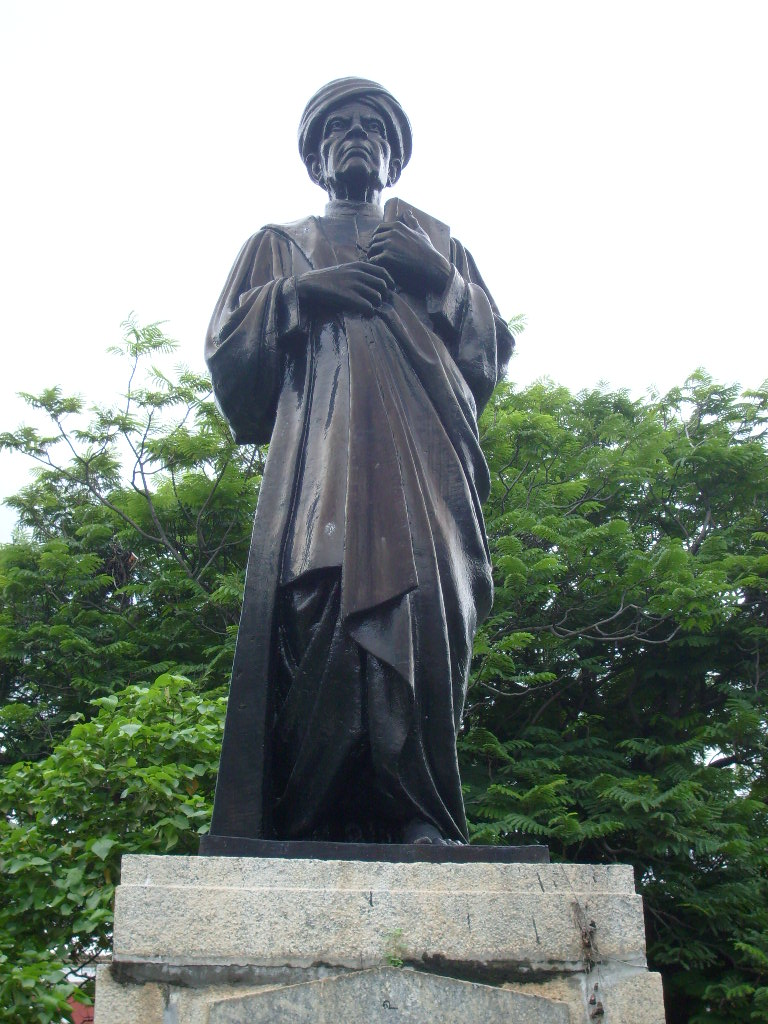
Statue of U. V. Swaminatha Iyer in the campus of Presidency College, Chennai

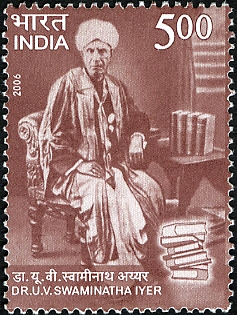
U.V. Swaminatha Iyer 2006 stamp of India

Besides writing his autobiography, U. V. Swaminatha Iyer also authored a two-volume biography of his tutor, Meenakshi Sundaram Pillai. Additionally, he wrote the biographies of Vidwan Thiagaraja Chettiar, Maha Vaidyanatha Iyer, and Gopalakrishna Bharati.

Dr U.V. Swaminatha Iyer along with C.W. Damodharam Pillai was responsible for the rediscovery of old classical heritage.

In 1906, U.V. Swaminatha Iyer was honored with the title Mahāmahōpādhyāya. (Tamil: மகாமகோபாத்தியாயர்)

In 1917, he was honored with the title Drāviḍavidyābhūṣaṇam. (Tamil: திராவிடவித்தியாபூடணம்)

In 1925, he was honored with the title Dākṣināṭyakalānidhi. (Tamil: தாட்சிணாத்தியகலாநிதி)

In 1932, Madras University honored him with a PhD.

After Iyer's death, his son, KalyanaSundara Iyer approached Adyar Brahma Gnana Sabha in Chennai and donated thousands of books and palm leaf manuscripts, and several thousands of letters written by eminent scholars and researchers to Iyer. The sabha started the Mahamahopadhyaya Dr.U.Ve.Swaminatha Iyer Library in 1943 and preserve these materials.

Tamil poet and nationalist Subramania Bharati, who inspired the freedom movement with his songs, admired Swaminatha Iyer. Paying tribute to Swaminatha Iyer in one of his poems, Bharati equated Iyer with the sage, Agastya when he called him Kumbamuni. He said, "So long as Tamil lives, poets will venerate you and pay obeisance to you. You will ever shine as an immortal."

The meeting of Rabindranath Tagore and the grand old man of Tamil literature in 1926 in Chennai was a historic moment. Not only did Tagore call on Swaminatha Iyer, but also penned a poem in praise of his efforts to salvage ancient classical Tamil literary works from palm leaf manuscripts.

Ki. Va. Jagannathan, also known as Ki.Va.Ja, was a student of Swaminatha Iyer.
