= R. Raghava Iyengar =

Indian literary scholar of the Tamil language

Mahavidwan R. Raghava Iyengar
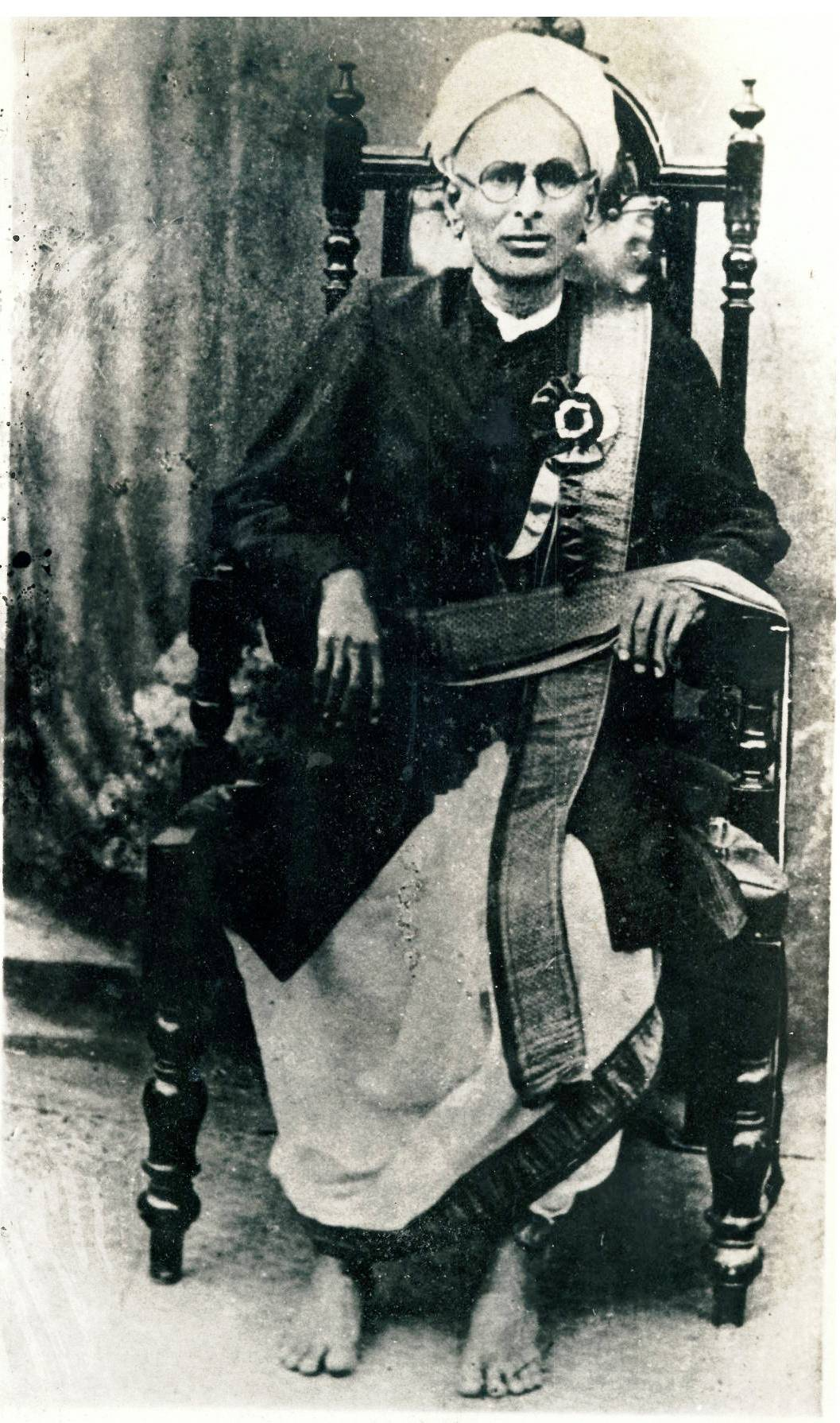
- Mahavidwan R. Raghava Iyengar
- Born: 20 September 1870; Thennavarayan, Tamil Nadu, India
- Died: 11 July 1946 (aged 75)
- Known for: Critical scholarship and Creative interpretation of literature.

The Bhasha Kavisekhara Mahavidwan R. Raghava Iyengar (1870–1946) was known for critical scholarship and creative interpretation of literature.

== Life ==
Mahavidwan R. Raghava Iyengar was born on 20 September 1870 in the village called Thennavarayan Pudukkottai, near Manamadurai, Ramanathapuram district]], Tamil Nadu. He devoted his entire time to the mastery of Tamil literature but was also well versed in Sanskrit. He attracted the attention of Prof. R. Ranganadam and Dewan Venkata Ranga Iyer who introduced him to Raja Bhaskara Sethupathi of Ramnad. At the age of 21, he was appointed Poet Laureate of the Sethu Samasthanam, a post he held for 42 years.

Raghava Iyengar took up the charge of reviving the ancient Sangams with the Fourth Tamil Sangam, where he was the promoter of Tamil Research. He was the editor of Sen Tamil and along with his cousin edited this journal for 3 years. He was the first to set the right norms for Tamil research which had a scientific basis. He wrote articles on Kamban, Valluvar and the female bards of Sangam literature. He wrote the biography of these poets, identified the cities mentioned in the Sangam works and established the correct authorship of many works of the Sangam age. He translated Kalidasa's Abhijñānaśākuntalam (The Recognition of Sakuntala) and the Bhagavad Gita. His cousin, Rao Sahib M. Raghava Iyengar, was also a famous Tamil scholar.

He was conferred the titles of Bhasha Kavisekhara and Mahavidwan and received a presentation of Rs 1,000 for his poem "Pari kathai". At the age of 65, he was the pioneer to be appointed as the Head of the Tamil Research Dept. of Annamalai University. He proved for the first time that Karur was the capital of the Cheras in the Sangam age. He died on 11 July 1946.

== Mahavidwan R. Raghava Iyengar's works ==
=== Edited works ===
1. Ahananooru
2. Kurunthogai Villakam – an erudite commentary on all 400 songs of Sangam classic literature
3. Perumpanarruppadai, Pattinappalai – In R Ragahva Iyengar's commentaries on the two Sangam classics, he identifies Thirumavalavan as the hero in Pattinappalai and Karikalan in Porunar arrupadai, another Sangam classic. They are two different Chola kings. In Perumpanarrupadai, he traces the origin of the Thiraiyans and the Pallavas and concludes that they came to Tamil Nadu from Dwaraka long long back.
4. Tolkappiyam
5. Athichoodi uraai – An elaborate commentary of poet Avvaiyar's one line moral sayings (Tanjore University publication)
6. Muthollayiram

=== Research books ===
1. Sethunadum thamizhum
2. Vanjimanagar – This book describes the capital of Cheras which has been identified as Karur on the banks of the river Amaravati and is known in literature as Vanji. Later epigraphical and archaeological evidence have confirmed the finding.
3. Andakola meyporul
4. Nallisaipulamai melliyalar – Biographical sketches of women Sangam poets like Avvaiyar, Parimahalir and several others
5. Tamil varalaru – Classic essays on the origin of Tamil, its people and customs, Tolkappiyar, Agastiyar, Sangams, literature before Tolkappiyam, Udiyan cheral and the connection of Tamil to other ancient languages.
6. Kocar – An ancient tribe like the Velirs who migrated from Kashmir and took part in Tamil politics by switching sides between the Cheras, Cholas and the Pandyas. They were always at war with the Velirs, another clan that came from the north
7. Thithan velir – Velir chief aligned with Chola kings whose coin was found near Karur, the Chera capital of Sangam age.
8. Kambar – A monograph with the complete survey of the great poet of 12th century.
9. Kurunila Vendar – This essay traces the origin of Tamil clans like the Velirs, Kocars, Pallavas and Sethupathi
10. Araichi Katturaihal, Iniya Ilakkiyangal & Sentamil Inbam – These are essays that deal with all aspects of Tamil and Tamil literature

=== Poems ===
1. Puvi ezhupathu – Poem in praise of mother earth on the lines of Kamban's Aer ezhupathu
2. Thozhil chirappu
3. Oru thurai kovai – A poem that is basically a great exercise of a difficult Tamil poetic form in praise of Sethupathi
4. Thiruvadimalai – This poem deals with his love for Lord Rama
5. Inkavi thirattu – Poems sung in praise of Gods at Sethu, Thiruppullani and Thirupathi
6. Githa thazhisai – Translation in poetic form of the Bhagavat Geetha, with Subramania Bharathi's prose translation in Tamil of each Sanskrit verse.
7. Andakola Meyyporul – A very rare song of vaishnavaite saint Nammalwar to Sangam poets in ahaval metre. Its meaning was bothering scholars for a long time. R Raghava Iyengar wrote an exquisite commentary on the philosophical meaning of this poem. Incidentally it proves that "Sangam" existed in some form until the 8th century
8. Puvi ezhupathu – Poem in praise of mother earth on the lines of Kamban's Aer ezhupathu

=== Translations ===
1. Abigna Sakuntalam Kalidasa's Sakuntalam – translated in sandam style.
2. Bhagavat Gita

His publications are available mainly in Annamalai University Library, Madras University, UVS Library (Thiruvanmiyur) and Tamil Sangam. His grandson Prof. R. Vijayaraghavan has published his essays as monographs. A research seminar on his work was conducted by Ulaga Tamil Araichi Kazaham in 2006. In recognition of the vital importance of his books, the Tamil Nadu State Government decided to republish his books by acquiring the copyright to his books (Tamil Nadu Budget Speech 2008–2009).
