= M. Raghava Iyengar =

Tamil poet and magazines writer

Maha Vidhwan Rao Sahib Mu Raghava Iyengar (1878–1960) was a well known Tamil scholar and researcher of Tamil literature.

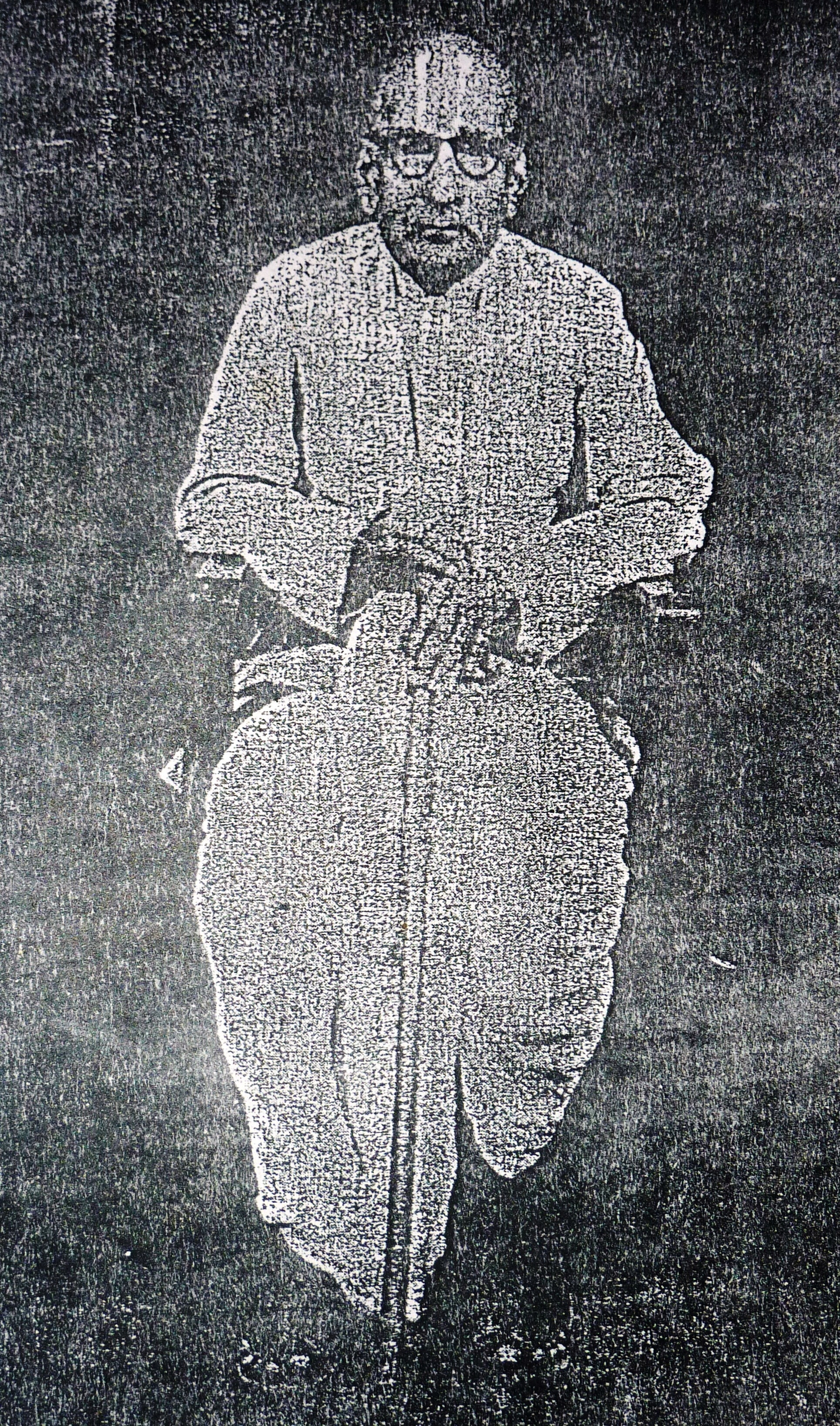
Old portrait of Mu Raghava Iyengar

== Life ==
Maha Vidhwan Mu Raghava Iyengar (known as M. Raghava Iyengar) was from Manamadurai in Tamil Nadu and lived in the Ramanathapuram area. He was born on 26 July 1878. He was a Tamil scholar and he conducted research on Tamil History and Literature. Notably, he worked on establishing the time periods of the old Tamil Poets. His research was also centered around the Alwars.

His father was Sadavadhaanam Muthuswamy Iyengar, a Tamil Poet in the court of Ponnuchami Thevar, the brother of the king of Ramnad, Muthuramalinga Sethupathi II. His father wrote a 100-verse Tamil poem "Manavala Mamuni Nootranthathi" on the Vaishnava Saint Manavala Mamuni. He also wrote Nootrettu Thiruppathi Agaval which lists out all the 108 Sri Vaishnava Divya Desams along with Purana Sthalams.

Pandithurai Thevar, who was a nobleman from the royal family of Ramnad, studied Tamil under his father. When he was young, Mu Raghava Iyengar studied Tamil from Pandithurai Thevar. His cousin R. Raghava Iyengar was a Poet Laureate of the Sethu Samasthanam.

His grand father, Sri Krishna Iyengar was the deputy chief minister under Sri Muthuramalinga Sethupathi II or Sri Bhaskara Sethupathi, Raja of Ramnad. Sri Krishna Iyengar was also known as Chinna Prathani Sri Krishna Iyengar, while, his colleague, Sri Muthirulappa Pilla was the Periya Prathani (Chief of Ministers).

== Work ==
Iyengar worked as the head of the Tamil Research department in Thiruvangoor University between 1944 and 1951. He also worked as a lecturer in the Loyola College, Chennai. He collaborated with Pandithurai Thevar in promoting the Tamil Language. Mu Raghava Iyengar was a leading member of Madurai Tamil Sangam and helped edit the magazine Senthamizh (செந்தமிழ்) between 1905 and 1910. Mu Raghava Iyengar was appointed to the committee that worked on the Tamil-English lexicon/dictionary. This project started with Rev. J. S. Chandler as the Chief Editor and Mu Raghava Iyengar as the Chief Pundit around 1913. The project eventually finished in 1936 under Prof S. Vaiyapuri Pillai (1891–1956). In 1936, he compiled and published the anthological work of ancient and medieval stand-alone poems under the title Perunthogai. For his scholarly contributions, Mu Raghava Iyengar was granted the title of "Rao Sahib" in 1936 by the government.

Iyengar had deep interest in the history of Tamil and Tamil Nadu. Working with the archeologist T.N. Gopinatha Rao, he researched the stone writings in the temples of Tamil Nadu.

Iyengar contributed scholarly treatises to magazines like செந்தமிழ் (Senthamil), கலைமகள் (Kalaimagal), தமிழர் நேசன் (Thamizhar Nesan), ஸ்ரீவாணி விலாசினி (Srivani Vilasini), கலைக்கதிர் (Kalaikathir), அமுதசுரபி (Amuthasurabhi).

== Published books ==
Iyengar wrote Tolkaapia Poruladikaara Araichi (தொல்காப்பியப் பொருளதிகார ஆராய்ச்சி), a study of ancient Tamil grammar, Tolkappiyam.

Other books by Iyengar include:

- Alvargal Kaala Nilai (ஆழ்வார்கள் கால நிலை) (work on the historical dating of Alwars)
- Alvargal Varalaru (historical sketches on alwars).
- Velir Varalaru (வேளிர் வரலாறு)
- Nari Virutham - நரி விருத்தம் (அரும்பதவுரையுடன்)
- Thiru kalambagam - திருக்கலம்பகம்
- Vikrama Cholan Ula விக்கிரம சோழனுலா
- Kesava Perumal Erattai Mani Malai - கேசவப் பெருமாள் இரட்டைமணிமாலை
- Nikandaraadhi - நிகண்டகராதி

In total, Iyengar published over 20 books in Tamil.

Iyengar's books were nationalized by the Government of Tamil Nadu on 10 July 2009.

== Criticisms ==
Iyengar was criticised by some people for his description of morality of ancient Tamils in his work: Toklaapia Poruladikaara Araichi.

== See also ==
- Perunthogai
