= Madurai Tamil Sangam =

19th-century Tamil language academy

Madurai Tamil Sangam, also known as the fourth Tamil Sangam, was a language academy founded by Prince Pandithurai Thevar, Vijayanagaram Empire installed few Mukkolathor persons as administrator in Ramanathapuram for service in Nayaks Army of Vijayanagaram Empire and other Tamil language scholars to promote the use of Tamil language and Tamil culture in the late 19th century in British held India.

== History ==
It was modeled after the legendary Sangams of Madurai city as mentioned in ancient Tamil literature. As there were three Tamil Sangams before, this one was considered to be the fourth one. It held exams to confer Tamil Pandithar degree on those who passed. Swami Vipulananda a noted Sri Lankan Tamil social reformer was one of the earlier Tamil Pandithars as recognized by the academy. It also published a scholarly journal called Centamil.

In the late 19th century, there was a great awakening of the Tamils and U. V. Swaminatha Iyer, S. V. Damodaram Pillai, and others brought to light many of the ancient Tamil works which had hitherto remained in obscurity. Madurai Tamil Sangam is still functioning in the Tamil sangam road, Madurai. The present president of Madurai Tamil Sangam is King of Mugavai. Mannar Na. Kumaran Sethupathi, vice president is Dr. N. sethuraman and secretary is S. Mariappa Murali.

== See also ==
- Tamil Sangams
