= C. W. Thamotharampillai =

Indian advocate and high court judge

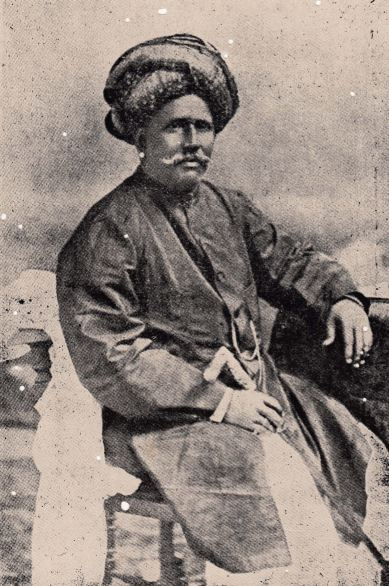
- Born: 12 September 1832; Siruppiddy, Jaffna District, British Ceylon
- Died: 1 January 1901 (aged 68); Purasawalkam, Madras Presidency, British India
- Education: BA (University of Madras, 1857); BL (Law)
- Occupations: Advocate, high court judge
- Known for: Tamil literature
- Title: Rao Bahadur
- Children: Alakasundaram
- Parent(s): Vairavanathapillai and Perundevi

Cirupitty Wyravanathar Thamotharampillai (Pillai) (Tamil: சி. வை. தாமோதரம்பிள்ளை; 12 September 1832 – 1 January 1901)), sometimes referred to by the initials as C. Y., devoted his energies to the work of editing and publishing some of the oldest works of classical Tamil poetry and grammar. According to Kamil Zvelebil, he was the first person to be "engaged in the rediscovery of the earliest classical literature" of Tamil, and that his "greatness and merits have never been acknowledged".

== Early life ==
Cirupitty Wyravanathar Thamotharampillai was born to Vairavanathapillai and Perundevi in Siruppiddy in British Ceylon. He chose to learn Tamil grammar and English at an early age. He studied science at the renowned Vaddukottai Seminary in Jaffna at the age of twelve. After that, In 1852 he worked sometime as a teacher in a School at Kopay, Ayalur. His son Alakasundaram is also a Tamil scholar.

=== Graduation ===
After finishing his college education in 1852 at Batticotta Seminary, Thamotharampillai taught for some years under the mission and then proceeded to Madras to head a mission-run daily. There he converted to Saivism, and wishing to keep his initials C. W., took on the name Cirupitty Wyravanathar Thamotharampillai. In 1858 he became the first student in the state to appear for the first Bachelor of Arts (B.A.) degree examination conducted by the University of Madras. He later became the headmaster of Tamil Nadu Kallikottai Government College. He then became an auditor on the Government Accounts Department and later as the attorney.

=== Editor ===
In 1853, he came to Chennai to become editor of the Tamil Nadu Daily Gazette run by Rev. Peter Percival, owner of the Wesleyan English School in Jaffna. He also worked as a Tamil Pandit in the Rajasthani College.

== Pioneer in Publishing ==
In 1853 he published a Tamil book on ethics entitled 'Needhi Neri Vilakkam', which not only sparked his interest in the field of book publishing, but also earned him the title of 'pioneer of Tamil publishing'.

== Manuscript Recovery ==
Jaffna born Pillai was the earliest scholar to systematically hunt for long-lost manuscripts and publish them using modern tools of textual criticism. These included:

- Viracoliyam (1881)
- Iraiyanar Akapporul (1883)
- Tolkappiyam-Porulatikaram (1885)
- Kalittokai (1887) - the first of the Eight Anthologies (Eṭṭuttokai).

Pillai, along with his contemporaries such as U. V. Swaminatha Iyer, was responsible for collecting and cataloguing numerous old Sangam manuscripts and preparing them into compilations and modern form.

Both Iyer and Pillai printed and published Tholkappiyam, Nachinarkiniyar urai (1895), Tholkappiyam Senavariyar urai, (1868), Manimekalai (1898), Cilappatikaram (1889), Pattupattu (1889), and Purananuru (1894), all with scholarly commentaries. Between them, they published more 100 works in all, including minor poems.

== Rao Bahadur Award ==
He continued to study law, and in 1871 received the 'B.L.'. After passing the examination, he worked as a lawyer in Kumbakonam and in 1884 he was appointed as a Judge of the Pudukottai High Court. In 1895, after his retirement of about six years, the government conferred the title of 'Rao Bahadur' on Damodaram Pillai.

== Death ==
At the age of sixty-nine, Thamotharampillai died on January 1, 1901 (March 18, 1901) in the Purasaiwakkam of Chennai

== Memorials ==
Statue of Thamotharampillai established at the Kopay Christian College where he studied, and a statue at Sirupiddy where he was born.

== Bibliography ==
List of books published and written by C. W. Thamotharampillai:

=== Published texts ===
C. W. Thamotharampillai published a number of ancient literature. Some of them are:

- Neethi Neri Vilakkam
- Cēṉāvaraiyar solladhikaaraththirku seaavaraiyar urai (1868)
- Veerasoozhiyam (1881)
- Irayanar Agaporul
- Kalitogai
- Tolkaappiya Poruladhikaarathirkaana nachinaarkiniyarurai
- Thirutanigai Puranam
- Ilakkana Vilakkam
- Soolamani
- Tolkaappiya ezhuthadhikaarathirkaana nachchinaarkkiniyanurai

=== Composed texts ===
- Kattalai Kalithurai
- Saiva magathuvam
- Vacaṉa cūḷāmaṇi
- Natchathira Maalai
- Aaraam vaasaga puththagam
- Ezhaam vaasaga puththagam
- Aadhiyaagama keerththanam
- Viviliya virodham
- Gaandhamalar alladhu karpin maatchi (novel)

== Books about him ==
Thamotharampillai's History, D.A. Rajaratnam Pillai, Published by: n. Munisami Mudaliar, 'Ananda Bodhini', Madras, 1934
