= Palavanatham =

Coordinates: 9°33′N 78°01′E

Palavanatham is a village in Aruppukottai Taluk, Virudhunagar District, Tamil Nadu, India. Palavanatham is 11.6 km from the main town Aruppukottai, 8.8 km from the District's Main City Virudhunagar, and 460 km from the State's Main City Chennai.

Pandithurai Thevar, the founder of the Fourth Tamil Sangam was born in this village. Pandithurai Thevar (1867-1911 AD) was a scholar and poet belonging to the royal house of the Sethupathis of Ramanathapuram. He was the Zamindar of Palavanatham. He was also a patron of arts, literary works, scholasticism, and poetry. He was a prolific speaker throughout the region.

== Nearby villages ==
Valukkalotti (1.2 km), Varalotti (5 km), Nagampatti (3 km), Villipathiri (3.4 km), Mettukundu (3.4 km), Soolakkarai (4.8 km). Nearby towns are Virudhunagar (8.8 km), Aruppukottai (11.6 km), Kariapatti (17 km), Tiruchuli (20.3 km).

== Temples in Palavanatham ==
There is the Kailasanadhar temple, a Pentecostal church, Nina Mohamed Paillivasal mosque, and many small temples including Pathirakaliamman temple Kannimariyamman temple, and Veera Maha Kaliyamman temple, Nadar Mariamman Kovil, Parthasarathy Perumal Kovil, Sri Anjaneyar Kovil.

== Schools and college in Palavanatham ==
- T E L C Primary School
- Panchayat Union Primary School
- Government Higher Secondary School
- Noble arts and science college for woman
- Jai Sai Ram College of Art and Science
