= Parimelalhagar =

Medieval Indian literary scholar of the Tamil language

- Vanduvarai Perumal
- Born: 13th century CE; Kanchipuram, Tamil Nadu, India
- Died: Probably 13th century CE
- Occupations: Scholar, poet and temple priest
- Writing career
- Pen name: Parimelalhagiyaar, Parimelalhagiyan, and Parimelalhagaraiyan
- Language: Tamil
- Period: 13th century CE
- Notable work: Commentary to the Tirukkural

Parimelalhagar (c. 13th century CE), sometimes spelled Parimelazhagar, born Vanduvarai Perumal, was a Tamil commentator and scholar known for his commentary on the Thirukkural. He was the last among the canon of ten medieval commentators of the Kural text most highly esteemed by scholars. He was also among the five oldest commentators whose commentaries had been preserved and made available to the Modern era, the others being Manakkudavar, Pari Perumal, Kaalingar, and Paridhi. Of all the ancient commentaries available of the Kural literature, Parimelalhagar's commentary is considered by scholars as the best both in textual and literary aspects. The codification of the writings of Valluvar is attributed to Parimelalhagar. Parimelalhagar also remains the most reviewed, in terms of both praise and criticism, of all the medieval Kural commentators. Praised for its literary richness and clarity, Parimelalhagar's commentary is considered highly complex and exquisite in its own right that it has several scholarly commentaries appearing over the centuries to elucidate it. Along with the Kural text, Parimelalhagar's commentary has been widely published that it is in itself regarded a Tamil classic.

Although the chapter ordering, and the verse ordering within each chapter, of the Tirukkural as set by Parimelalhagar varies greatly from the original work of Valluvar, the scholars and publishers of the modern era primarily follow Parimelalhagar's ordering. Thus, it is Parimelalhagar's ordering that is used to number the Kural chapters and couplets today.

== Early life ==
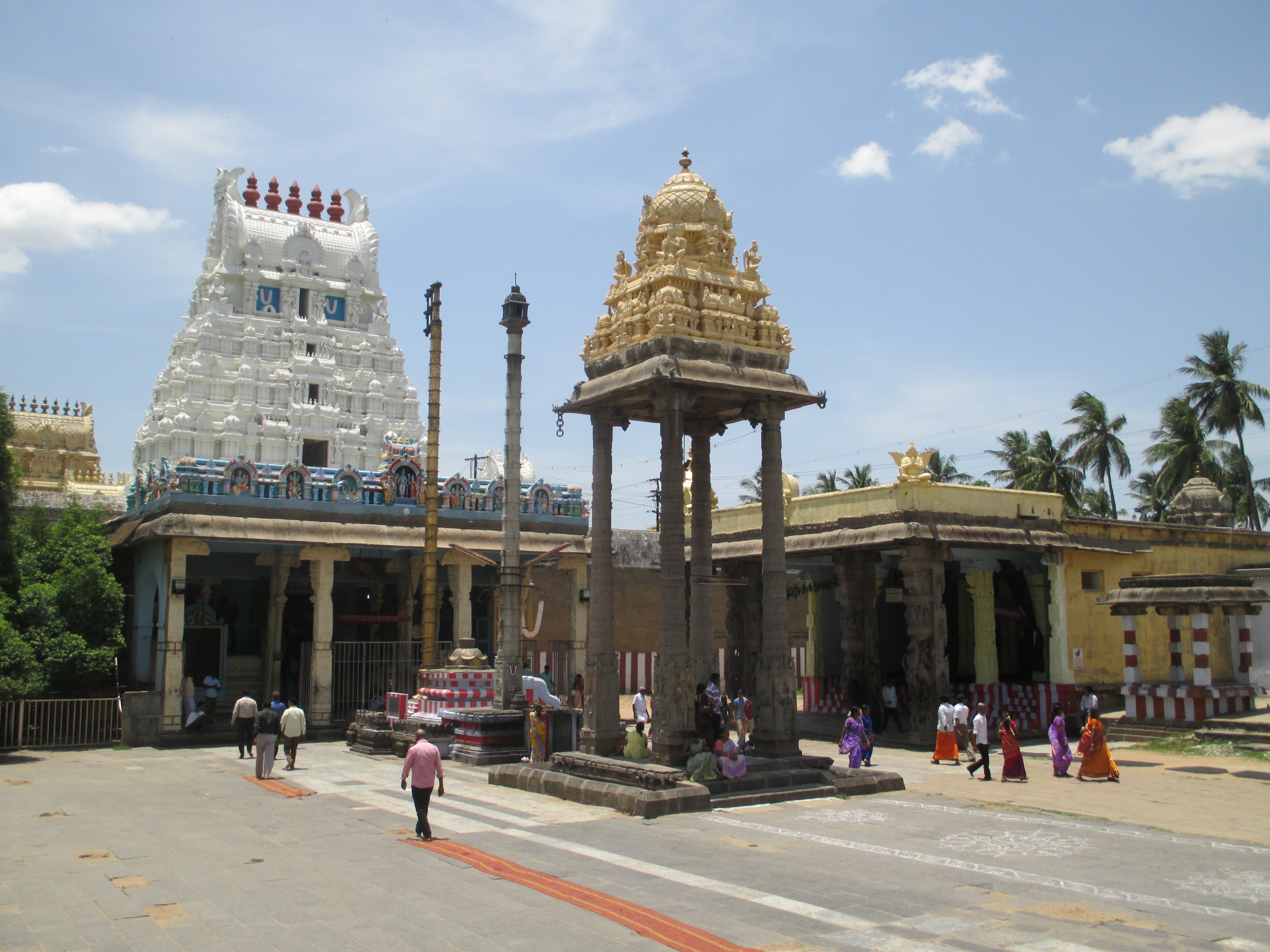
Varadaraja Perumal Temple at Kanchipuram, where inscription mentioning Parimelalhagar is found.

Parimelalhagar was born Vanduvarai Perumal in Kancheepuram in the erstwhile Tondai state in a Vaishnavite Brahmin family and is believed to have lived during the late 13th century CE. He belonged to the lineage of priests of Sri Ulagalandha Perumal temple in his home town. He is also known by various names as Vanduvarai Perumal, Parimelalhagiyaar, Parimelalhagiyan, and Parimelalhagaraiyan. Sivagyana Munivar mentions him as Parimelalhagiyaar in his work.

Parimel's time has been deduced by referring to various historical accounts. In his venpa verse named "Valluvar seer", Umapathi Shivachariyar, a poet from the late 13th century, lists Parimel's commentary as one of the six greatest works ever in the Tamil language. In the introductory section of his commentary to Book III of the Kural, Parimel mentions King Bhoja (reigned c. 1010–1055 CE) from the Paramara dynasty and his work Shringara-Prakasha, which has been dated to early 11th century. Also scholars assert that Senavarayar precedes Parimel in time. Thus, Parimel is believed to have been born in the early 13th century.

There are accounts of Parimel's living in both the cities of Kancheepuram and Madurai. Verse 41 of the Thondaimandala Sadhagam says that "Parimelalhagar of Kancheepuram served as beacon to the Kural." Additionally, an inscription on a plaque dating back to 1271 CE, which was erected in the 22nd year of the rule of the Telugu Chola King Vijayakanda Gopalan, mentions a land transaction done by Parimelalhagiya Dhadhan. According to M. Raghava Iyengar, this Parimelalhagiya Dhadhan was none other than Parimel. These serve as evidence to the claim that Parimel lived in Kancheepuram. According to another tradition, Parimel is said to be a native of Kadayam in Tirunelveli district and that his master was Jenana Vira Iyer, who made his pupil a guru to the Nadar sect and gave him the name Parimelalhagar. Verses 1547 and 1548 of the Perunthirattu indicate that he was a political figure in the town of Okkur near Madurai in the Pandya Kingdom, for which he was known as "Okkai Kavalan" (lit. "protector of Okkur"). The word usage that he employed in his Kural commentary (as in couplet 650) appears to be the colloquial version of the language spoken in Tirunelveli district even today. Incidentally, there are also several tombs indicating the name "Parimelalhagar" found across the district. These indicate that he must have lived in the Pandya Kingdom, chiefly Madurai.

Right from his young age, Parimel was well versed in Sanskrit language's Tharka, Vyakarna, Sankya, and Vedanta and Tamil language's Tolkappiyam and other classic literary works. Despite being a Vaishnavite, Parimel had a great knowledge of the Saivite literature. He had a good understanding of Agama, Siddhanta and Vedanta, which are considered vital to unravel the riches of the Tirukkural, which helped him do justice to his commentary. When Parimel chose to write a literary criticism, he analysed in depth the works of the previous nine commentators who lived before his time and eliminated the flaws found in those earlier commentaries. When he completed his writing and perfected the work, he decided to stage it in the court of the Pandya ruler. Legend has it that the King wanted Parimel to stage his work seated on a bronze horse mounted in his court. When Parimel did so, the bronze horse moved, serving as evidence to his scholarly stature. Thus he came to be known as Parimelalhagar (meaning "the handsome equestrian"). The name is sometimes indicated as "Parimelalhagiyar" and "Parimelalhagaraiyyan". His commentary on the Kural came to be called "Parimelalhagiyar Virutthi". He is believed to have written the commentary around 1271–1272 CE as indicated in an inscription at the Varadharaja Perumal Temple at Kanchipuram. This is indicated in the work Sasana Tamil Kavi Saritham by Raghava Iyengar. Parimel has also written a commentary on Paripaadal, one of the work of the Eight Anthologies (Ettuthogai).

== Religion ==
There are several pieces of evidence indicating that Parimelalhagar belonged to the Vaishnavite sect. His explanations to Kural couplets 610 and 1103, his reference to the Nalayira Divya Prabandham in various instances, his employment of verses from the Tiruvaymoli in couplets 349 and 370, and his citing Nammalvar's verses in chapter 39 in the second book of the Kural text all indicate that he was a Vaishnavite. While a staunch devotee of Vishnu, Parimel practiced religious tolerance and treated other religions of his time with equal respect.

== Commentary to the Kural text ==
Parimelalhagar's commentary is considered by scholars the best of all ancient commentaries on the Kural text and is esteemed on par with the Kural text itself for its literary quality. Scholars attribute the codification of the writings of Valluvar to Parimelalhagar. Parimel was highly successful in reflecting all the poetic nuances found in Valluvar's thought in prosaic form in his commentary. No other commentator so far has matched his style, clarity and High Tamil writing in the history of Tamil literature. The literary quality of Parimel's commentary is so rich that one has to depend on highly learned intellectuals to completely understand the commentary. It is said that Parimel has commented on the grammatical construction for more than 500 couplets of the Kural text, without which it is believed that the import of these couplets could have been easily misconstrued. His command of the Tamil grammar can be observed from his commentary to kurals 127, 196, 272, 1029, 1030, 1115, and 1186, where he had given grammar notes explaining different parts of speech. Throughout Book III of the Kural literature, Parimel explains the grammar of the akam (inner feelings or subjective) genre of Tamil literature. In Chapters 77 (Army) and 78 (Valour) of Book II, Parimel explicates the puram (outer actions or objective) genre of Tamil literature, which can be observed especially from his elaborations to kurals 771, 773, and 774. Parimel embellishes his commentary by employing similes (e.g., kurals 100, 144, 343, 360, 399, 404, 416, 422, 425, 448, 571, 693, 741, 797, 900) and adding literary accounts where necessary (e.g., kural 63). He quotes from earlier commentators (e.g., kurals 17, 18, 207, 210, 290, 305, 580, 593, 599, 612, 615, 910, 925, 1028), points out varied inferences, and debunks any incorrect inferences. He also provides Tamil translations of Sanskrit terms used by Valluvar. In several instances, he extols the best explanations for a particular couplet given by earlier commentators. He also includes in his commentaries literary accounts from both Tamil and Sanskrit literature. In several places, he points out the Tamil traditions that are in line with the moral of the couplets. He also includes several historical accounts across his commentary (e.g., couplets 100, 144, 514, 547, 771, 773, 785, 899, 900, 935). Parimelalhagar compulsively elucidates the ethical connections between seemingly contradictory thoughts laid out in couplets 380 and 620, 481 and 1028, 373 and 396, and 383 and 672. All these made his commentary coming to be known as "Viruddhi Urai" (expandable commentary).

Parimel writes commentaries beginning with an introduction to each book and explains the introductory chapters in each of the Kural books. He analyzes and segregates chapters as subdivisions known as iyals. He summarizes the contents of each chapter with an abstract at the beginning of each chapter, and also connects the previous chapter with the current one in a logical manner, justifying his own way of chapter arrangement. He also connects every couplet within a chapter by explaining the flow of thoughts between them. He writes a verbatim explanation to each couplet and clarifies the meaning of difficult words. He also indicates that every manuscript of the Kural by earlier commentators had only verbatim explanations and that detailed commentaries were made by those who published those manuscripts. Below his verbatim explanations, he provides lucid explanations in contemporary language, which contain several well-researched notes. He also provides ample examples wherever necessary, employing several literary phrases before his time in prose. Being the last of the medieval commentators, Parimel verily had the opportunity to study the commentaries of all those who lived before his time. In most places he agrees with Manakkudavar and cites his work amply. In places where he is in disagreement with Manakkudavar and other early commentators, Parimel debunks their ideas sincerely with logical explanations. Although the original text of Parimel's commentary appears in a summary form (known as polhippurai) describing the meaning and moral of a given couplet, later scholars split it in order to simplify it, providing word-by-word meaning.

Parimel is known to be a polymath. His expertise spanned across fields such as ethics, linguistics, philosophy, mathematics, poetry, logic, metaphysics, theology, politics, music, and medicine. His knowledge of theology and religion surfaces across his commentary to Book I, examples being his elaboration to couplets 21, 62, 351, 355, 358, 338, and 360. He discusses the Samkhya philosophy in couplet 27 and Arhat in couplet 286. His political acumen can be seen in virtually every chapter of Book II, more so in his explanations to couplets 385, 442, 735, 756, and 767. His musical knowledge is expressed in his commentary for kural 573. His knowledge on medicine can be seen in his commentary for kurals 941, 944, 948, and 950. Parimel is also known for prudently employing the prevailing culture and linguistic usage of his time.

=== Changes made by Parimelalhagar in his commentary ===
==== Variations in ordering of the Kural verses ====
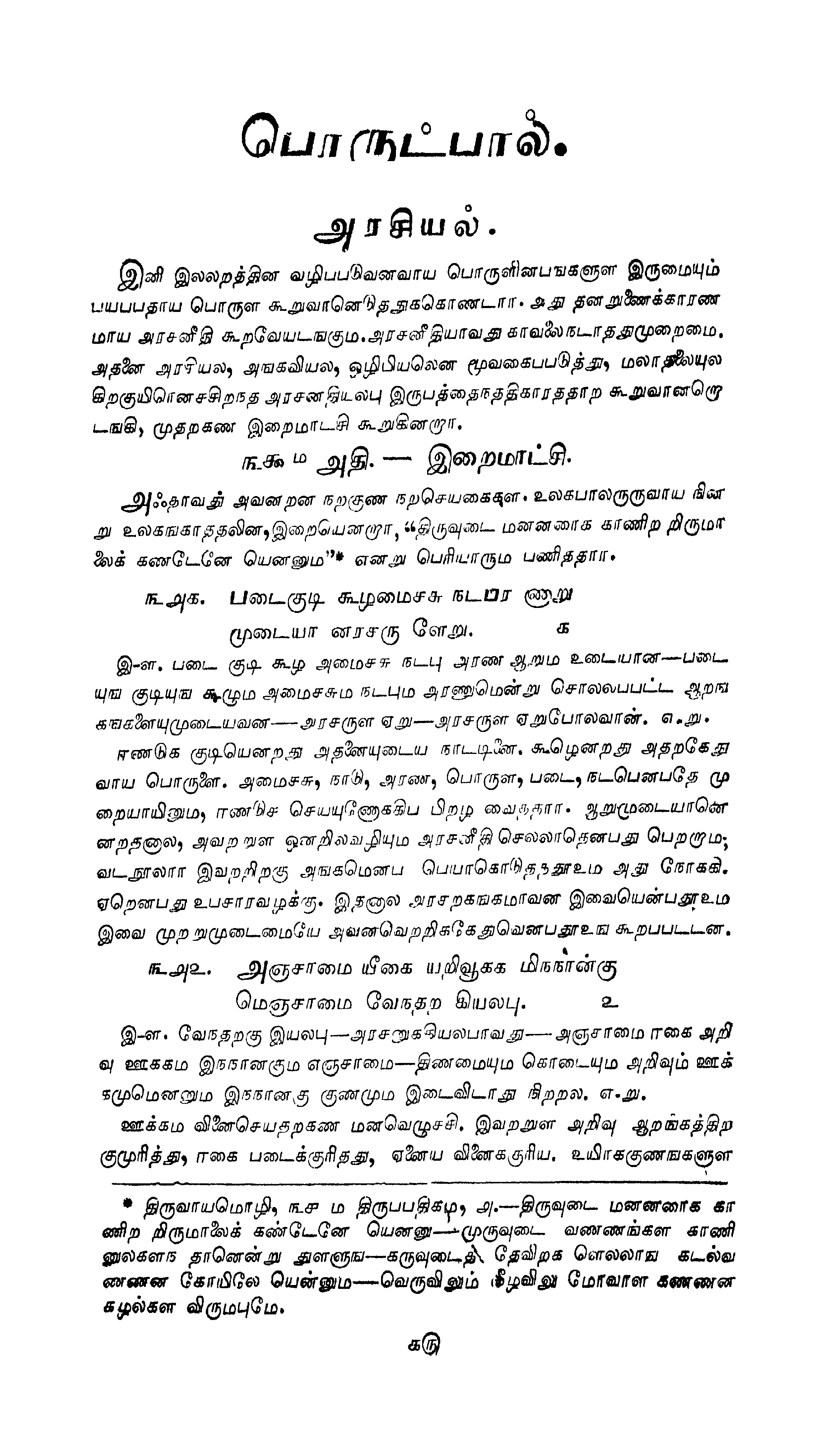
A page from the Parimelalhagar's commentary on the 39th chapter of the Tirukkural

The following table depicts the variations among the early commentators' ordering of, for example, the first ten verses of the Tirukkural. Note that the ordering of the verses and chapters as set by Parimel, which had been followed unanimously by both scholars and critics for centuries ever since, has now been accepted as the standard ordering of the Kural couplets.

Kural verse beginning	Couplet ordering				
Kural verse beginning	Manakkudavar's	Pari Perumal's	Paridhi's	Kaalingar's	Parimelalhagar's
Kural 1: அகர முதல எழுத்தெல்லாம்	1	1	1	1	1
Kural 2: கற்றதனால் ஆய பயன்	2	2	2	2	2
Kural 3: மலர்மிசை ஏகினான் மாணடி	3	3	3	3	3
Kural 4: வேண்டுதல் வேண்டாமை இலான்	6	6	5	7	4
Kural 5: இருள்சேர் இருவினையும் சேரா	7	7	6	6	5
Kural 6: பொறிவாயில் ஐந்தவித்தான்	8	8	7	7	6
Kural 7: தனக்கு உவமை இல்லாதான்	4	4	6	4	7
Kural 8: அற ஆழி அந்தணன்	5	5	10	9	8
Kural 9: கோளில் பொறியில் குணமிலவே	10	10	8	5	9
Kural 10: பிறவிப் பெருங்கடல் நீந்துவர்	9	9	9	10	10

It is found that there are as many as 120 variations found in the ordering of the Kural couplets by Parimel with respect to the commentary by Manakkudavar.

==== Subdividing the books ====
Like all other medieval commentators, Parimel divides the books of the Kural text in his own way. He divides Book I into three parts, namely, invocation or introduction, domestic virtues, and ascetic virtues, while other medieval commentators divided Book I into four portions, namely, introduction, domestic virtues, ascetic virtues, and fate. While other medieval commentators divide Book II into five or even six parts, Parimel divides the book into three parts, namely, kingship (royalty), elements of sovereignty (angas or limbs of the state) and common duties. While Parimel's division of Book III consists of two parts, namely, Kalavu (secret love) and Karpu (wedded love), other medieval scholiasts have divided the Book of Inbam into three to five portions.

==== Textual variations ====
Spelling, homophonic, and other minor textual variations between Manakkudavar and Parimelalhagar commentaries are found in several verses such as couplets 139, 256, 317, and 445.

Parimel's version of the Kural text varies from that of Manakkudavar in about 220 instances, including 84 in Book I, 105 in Book II, and 32 in Book III of the Kural text. With regard to the commentary by Kaalingar, Parimelalhagar's version varies in about 215 places. He has cited other earlier commentators in as many as 133 places within his commentary. He has justified the changes that he has made to the Kural text in about 48 instances. In instances such as his explanations to kurals 41, 100, 114, 235, and 563, the meanings given by Parimel differ from that of other medieval commentators.

==== Chapter order variations ====
Like the other commentators before his time, Parimelalhagar has swapped as many as six chapters in Book I of the Kural text, changing the Kural's original chapter ordering found in Manakkudavar's commentary. The chapters "Shunning meat-eating," "Not stealing," "Not lying," "Refraining from anger," "Ahimsa," and "Non-killing", all of which originally appeared under subsection "Domestic virtues" in Manakkudavar's version, appear under "Ascetic virtues" in Parimel's version. Similarly, the chapters "Kindness of speech," "Self-control," "Not envying," "Not coveting another’s goods," "Not backbiting," and "Not uttering useless words", all of which appear under "Ascetic virtues" in Manakkudavar's version, appear under "Domestic virtues" in Parimel's version. Nevertheless, modern scholars have adopted Parimel's version for chapter ordering and couplet numbering.

The following table lists the variations between ordering of chapters in Book I by Manakkudavar (the oldest of the Medieval commentators) and that by Parimelalhagar (the latest).

Manakkudavar's ordering		Parimelalhagar's ordering (followed today)	
Chapters under subdivision “Domestic virtues”: 5. Household life 6. The virtues of a wife 7. Offspring; 8. Loving-kindness; 9. Hospitality; 10. Not lying 11. Gratitude; 12. Impartiality; 13. Patience; 14. Right conduct 15. Not coveting another's wife 16. Refraining from anger 17. Ahimsa/not doing harm 18. Not killing 19. Shunning meat-eating 20. Not stealing 21. Dread of evil deeds 22. Social duty 23. Generosity; 24. Glory	Chapters under subdivision “Ascetic virtues”: 25. Benevolence, mercy, and compassion 26. Kindness of speech 27. Self-control; 28. Austerities; 29. Hypocrisy; 30. Not envying 31. Not coveting another's goods 32. Not backbiting 33. Not uttering useless words 34. Instability; 35. Relinquishment; 36. Realization of the truth 37. Rooting out desire	Chapters under subdivision “Domestic virtues”: 5. Household life 6. The virtues of a wife 7. Offspring; 8. Loving-kindness; 9. Hospitality; 10. Kindness of speech 11. Gratitude; 12. Impartiality; 13. Self-control; 14. Right conduct 15. Not coveting another's wife 16. Patience; 17. Not envying 18. Not coveting another's goods 19. Not backbiting 20. Not uttering useless words 21. Dread of evil deeds 22. Social duty 23. Generosity; 24. Glory	Chapters under subdivision “Ascetic virtues”: 25. Benevolence, mercy, and compassion 26. Shunning meat-eating 27. Austerities; 28. Hypocrisy; 29. Not stealing 30. Not lying 31. Refraining from anger 32. Ahimsa/not doing harm 33. Not killing 34. Instability; 35. Relinquishment; 36. Realization of the truth 37. Rooting out desire

=== Adoptions from previous commentators ===
Being the last of the Ten medieval commentators, Parimel had the unique opportunity to study in depth all the previous commentaries and imbibe the ideas in them. This enabled him to come up with a better commentary than all the earlier commentaries. In the process, he both adopted many of the thoughts and eliminated some of them which he felt did not make sense. He adopts Manakkudavar's style of reordering the couplets within the chapter in order to keep together the couplets that closely resembled in meaning, besides imparting new perspectives. While Kaalingar gives an abstract of the forthcoming chapter after the final verse in every chapter, Parimel adopts this method and writes the abstract of the respective chapter at the beginning of each chapter. While he appreciates other commentators' appropriateness in their commentaries, he does not hesitate to point out their shortcomings whenever they occur, with proper reasoning. Throughout his commentary, Parimel is also generous in acknowledging the other viewpoints that differ from his own. His explanations to couplets 223, 643, 817, 1069, and 1262 serve as evidence to his sincerity in appreciating others' commentaries.

=== Literature cited ===
Parimelalhagar had an excellent command of both Tamil and Sanskrit. Verse 1543 of the Perunthogai extols Parimel's erudition in both languages. His in-depth knowledge of Tamil can be seen in his usage of more than 230 linguistic and literary examples that he has employed in his commentary to the Kural. In as many as 286 instances, he even lucidly elaborates the meaning of highly literary Tamil words of his time. His grammar notes and linguistic explanations found in his commentary on couplets 2, 6, 11, 15, 16, 17, 22, 29, 36, 39, 41, 43, 48, 49, 66, 141, 147, 148, 167, 171, 177, 178, 180, 261, 378, and 381 are but examples of his extraordinary command of the Tamil language. He has also cited various works of the Tamil literature in his commentary. These include various Sangam texts (including Purananuru, Kaliththokai, Agananuru, Natrinai, Kurunthogai, Pattinappaalai, Paripaadal, Nedunalvaadai, Pathitrupathu, and Porunaraatruppadai), epics (including Jeevaka Chinthamani, Silappadikaram, Manimekalai, Valayapathi, the Mahabaratha, and the Ramayana), moral works of the Eighteen Lesser Texts (including Naladiyar, Nanmanikkatigai, Palamoli Nanuru, and Thirikatukam), religious scriptures (including Tiruvaymoli and Tirukkovaiyar), grammar texts (including Purapporul Venbamaalai, Tolkappiyam, and Iraiyanar Akapporul), Mutthollaayiram, and the mathematical text of Yerambam. Parimel cites Agananuru in his commentary for kural 210; Pathitrupatthu for kural 432; Nattrinai for kural 401; Nanmanikkadigai for kurals 121 and 556; Patthupaattu for kurals 811, 1033, and 1144; Jivakachinthamani for kurals 384, 514, and 771; Periyapuranam for kural 442; the Ramayana for kural 773; Tiruvaymoli for kurals 349 and 570; Mutthollayiram for kurals 576; and Tirukkovaiyar for kural 277. He also cites several Ancient Indian parables in places such as kurals 547, 899, 900, and 935. He cites the rules of the Tolkappiam in couplets 3, 402, 899, 960, and 1043. He also applies the Tolkappiam rules in kurals 86, 183, and 457, while in kural 863 he applies the rules of the Nannool. While he extols Sanskrit literature in several places, there are also instances where he criticizes them (e.g., kural 961). In many places, Parimel cites other couplets of the Kural literature itself to explain a given couplet; examples include his explanations for couplets 135, 161, 263, 305, 457, 720, 755, 955, 971, and 972.

Parimel cites several works from the Sanskrit literature in his commentary. Like Valluvar, Parimel displays a good comprehension of the pan-Indian philosophies and employs them well across his writings. His understanding of the linguistic, literary, philosophical and religious ideas of the extra-Tamil domains can be seen in his elaborations to kurals 141, 501, 693, 890, and 1318. The Sanskrit works that separately deal with the dharma, artha, and kama aspects of the Purushartha are appropriately mentioned across his commentary. For example, the dharma-based Sanskrit works are cited in his commentary to couplet 240; artha-based works in couplets 550, 663, 687, and 920; and kama-based works both at the beginning and conclusion of Book III. There are also instances where the works that Parimel cites in his commentary could not be identified or presumed to be lost, such as his explanations to kurals 62, 392, 566, 732, 1058, and 1099.

== Publication of the commentary ==
Of all the commentaries available on the Kural text, the Parimelalhagar commentary was the first to be published by modern printing technology and remains the widely published commentary to date. In his work Tamil Literature, M. S. Purnalingam Pillai attests that copies of Parimel's original commentary were preserved by the 16th-century scholar Thirumeni Rathna Kavirayar and by Thevarpiran Kavirayar of Alwar Tirunagari. The commentary was first analyzed, annotated and published by Ramanuja Kavirayar and came to print in 1840. This was followed by another commentary by Tirutthanigai Saravanaperumal Aiyar, which was based on Parimel's original commentary. Murugesa Mudhaliyar published Parimel's commentary with explanations in 1885. The annotated Parimel's commentary by Arumuka Navalar, whose work came out in several editions, remains one of the best Parimel's commentary ever published. As of 2013, Perimelalhagar's commentary appeared in more than 200 editions by as many as 30 publishers.

== Views about Valluvar ==
Parimelalhagar held Valluvar in high regard for upholding virtue incessantly throughout the work of the Kural. Parimel addresses Valluvar as Deiva Pulamai Thiruvalluvar (literally "divine philosopher Thiruvalluvar"). In what is known in the scholarly circle as his most famous quote on Valluvar, Parimel praises Valluvar in his commentary to couplet 322 thus: "It is Valluvar’s innate nature to select the best virtues said in all the known works and present them in a manner that is common and acceptable to everyone."

According to Jagannathan, Parimelalhagar believed that Valluvar authored the Kural text with his vast knowledge obtained after extensively studying several works, including numerous Sanskrit works of ancient times. This can be observed from Parimel's introduction to the main text of Kural's Book I, his commentary to couplets 662 and 1330, and his introduction to Book III of the Kural text.

== Other works ==
Apart from his work on the Kural, Parimelalhagar has also written commentary on the Sangam works of the Paripaadal of the Eight Anthologies series and Tirumurukāṟṟuppaṭai of the Ten Idylls series. The old commentary on the Paripaadal is attributed to Parimel by U. V. Swaminatha Iyer, who published it. Scholars consider his commentary on the Paripaadal to be older than his commentary on the Tirukkural. Scholars such as Gopalakrishnamachariyar claim that the Parimelalhagar commentary on the Tirumurukāṟṟuppaṭai is written by a different poet of his namesake of a different period in time. Parimel characterizes the poet Kanthiyar, who lived before his time, as Nanthidai Maduttha Kanthi, as she had tampered with and interpolated verses in Paripaadal similar to the way she did in Jivaka Chinthamani, which were later removed by Parimel when he annotated the poem.

== Reception ==
Take any couplet from the Kural literature at random and,
after a month-long analysis, write a detailed commentary on it.
Now look at Parimelalhagar's exegesis on said couplet. You're
sure to find something in it that you've heretofore not imagined.

— U. V. Swaminatha Iyer

Parimelalhagar is considered the greatest commentator in the history of Tamil literature and has been praised by scholars down the ages. Medieval scholars praise him as the one who had expanded on Valluvar's original thoughts, as revealed from verse 1544 of the Perunthogai. Several medieval verses, including verses 1543 and 1545–1548 of the Perunthogai, verse 41 of the Thondaimandala Sadhagam, a verse by Umapathi Shivachariyar, Chapters 2–4 (verses 51, 52) of the Perunkathai, and the work of Abidhana Kosham, praise Parimel and his work. Umapathi Shivachariyar holds Parimel's work on par with Valluvar's.

Scholars consider Parimelalhagar's commentary to be highly exquisite that only learned intellectuals can completely grasp the subtleties found in his commentary. This led to several scholars writing more simplified commentaries to Parimel's exegesis in order to bring the work to the general audience. Some of these "commentaries to the Commentary" include Nunporulmaalai by Thirumeni Rathna Kavirayar; the works of Saravanaperumal Iyer, Murugesa Mudaliyar, and Ramanuja Kavirayar; and the explanatory notes by K. Vadivelu Chettiar (1919), Arasan Shanmuganar, Krishnampettai K. Kuppusamy Mudaliar (1924), V. M. Gopala Krishnamacharya, and Chinnasamy Rajendiran (2018). Parimel remains the most researched, most praised, and most criticized of all the medieval Kural commentators.

Parimel is equally praised by modern scholars, including U. V. Swaminatha Iyer, S. Vaiyapuri Pillai, T. P. Meenakshisundaram, and K. Appadurai Pillai. George L. Hart regards Parimel's treatise on yoga asanas as one of the purest literary works in Tamil. Simon Casie Chetty, in his Tamil Plutarch, mentions Parimel as a Tamil poet who is renowned mainly because of his commentary on the Tirukkural. He also states that although there are at least nine other known medieval commentaries, all of which are considered highly scholarly and of high literary value, Parimel's is regarded as the best of the ten. According to P. S. Sundaram, Parimel's commentary on the Kural is praised for his in-depth knowledge of both Sanskrit and Tamil, his acumen in detecting the errors of earlier commentators, and the fullness and brevity of his own commentary. Sundaram also hints that Parimel begins each chapter of the Kural in his commentary by citing a reason for its placement in the sequence by him. Scholars such as M. P. Srinivasan interpret Parimel's commentary to some of the Kural couplets (e.g., kurals 752 and 1045) as being picturesque in nature.

Parimel is criticised by some Dravidianists of the contemporary era for interpreting certain verses of the Kural text in a more Brahmanical way. According to Norman Cutler, Parimel interpreted the text in Brahmanical premises and terms in accordance with the cultural values of the commentator. He further says that Parimel's elegantly written interpretations have made his commentary a Tamil classic in itself and reflects both the cultural values and textual values of the 13th-to-14th-century Tamil Nadu and that Valluvar's text can be interpreted and manoeuvred in other ways. Critics consider Parimel's way of defining aram (virtue) in the earlier parts of his work as flawed and denounce his explanations to couplets 37 and 501, accusing him of imbibing more ideas from the Sanskrit literature. Parimel is also criticized by scholars for the patriarchal opinions found in his commentary. Jagannathan, for instance, considers Parimel a product of his time, citing his male-centered explanations to kurals 61, 69, and 336.

The 20th-century Kural commentaries of the Dravidian movement, which criticize Parimel's exegesis, are in turn criticized by scholars for being biased in their approach. For instance, Sami Thiagarajan, in his Thirukkural Urai Vipareetham, points to these Dravidian commentaries as taking a distortive approach and seeking to stigmatise Parimel's commentary as espousing varnashrama dharma and giving importance to Sanskrit works. He further states that in the process of injecting rationalistic egalitarianism into interpretations of the Kural thoughts, these Dravidian renditions "wrenched [the Kural text] out of its rich cultural, philosophical and spiritual underpinnings." According to him, this trend began in as early as the 1920s, although Pulavar Kulandhai's 1949 work is considered the first 'rationalist' Tirukkural commentary.

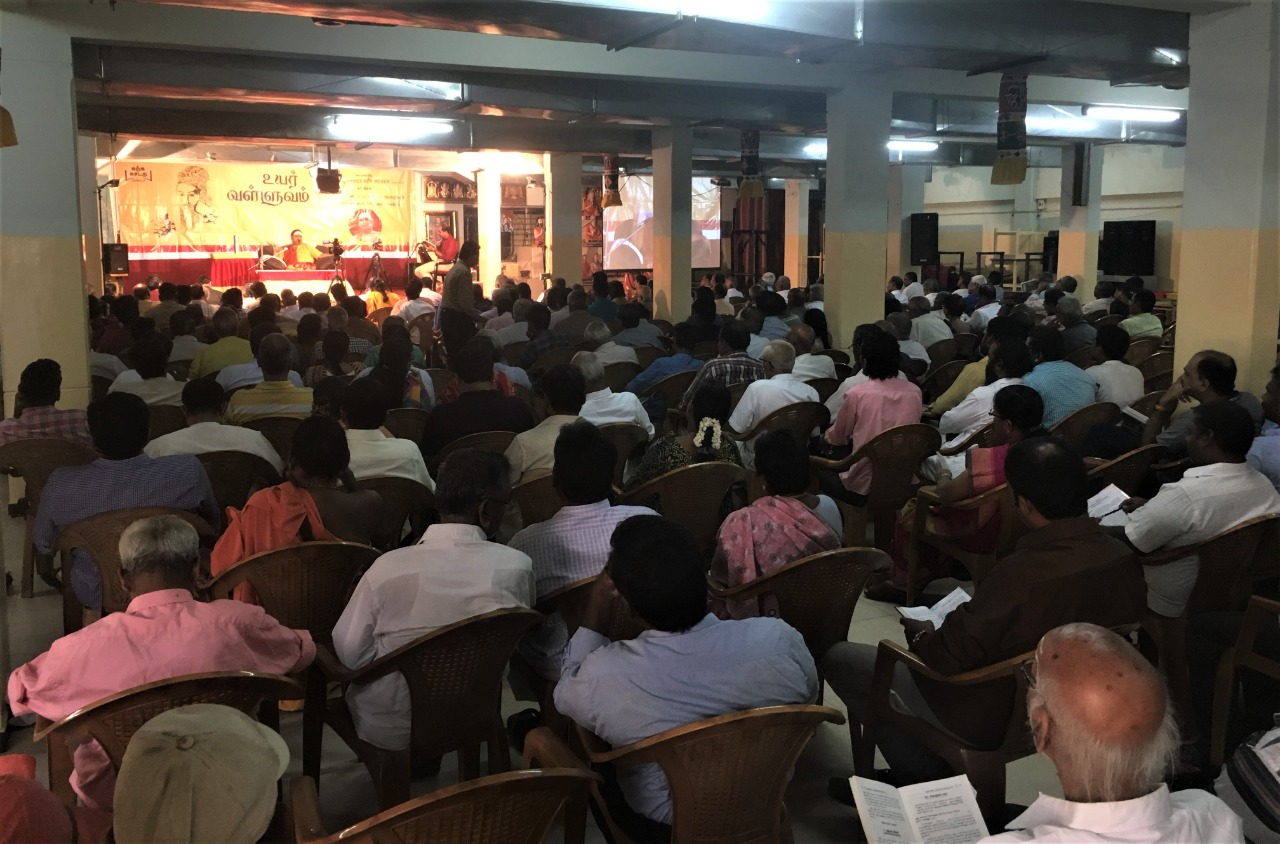
A Kural discourse in progress, with the Parimelalhagar commentary being recited.

All these criticisms notwithstanding, Parimel's work remains an esteemed one to this day. Scholars opine that the content and structural integrity of the Kural literature remained unsullied over the centuries chiefly because of Parimel's commentary to the text. T. P. Meenakshisundaram stated that without the "boat" of Parimel's commentary, the import of the Kural text would not have made it to the modern era "past the dark seas of the intervening centuries". According to M. V. Aravindan, the novel perspectives found in Parimel's work are praiseworthy. In History of Tamil Literature, C. Jesudasan says that Parimel's style is "in singularly clear and chaste Tamil" and adds that "Tiruvalluvar is fortunate in finding a commentator with such a keen perception". According to Mohan and Sokkalingam, the subtlety of the Parimel commentary is such that not a single word can be added or removed from it without tampering with its literary richness and clarity. M. Arunachalam considers the variations in Parimel's explanations as insignificant to the overall esteem of his commentary. E. Sundaramoorthy, former vice chancellor of the Tamil University, says that there is no avoiding Parimel because even those who disagree with Parimel require studying his commentary. According to K. Appadurai Pillai, no critiques of Parimel's work ever acted as a chisel that shaped the form of the rock (the "rock" here denoting Parimel's commentary for the Kural literature) but only remained as the waves that strike against the unshakeable bedrock. In the words of Chinnasamy Rajendiran, author of one of the simplified commentaries on Parimel's exegesis, while the Tirukkural is an "awe-inspiring mountain", Parimelalhagar is "a kindly guide who offers his hand to seekers to help them scale its peaks".

== In popular culture ==
Parimelalhagar remains the most studied commentator in the history of Tamil literature, and his commentary remains widely read among the commentaries on the Kural text. The commentary also remains the primary topic of interest in the discourses held on the topic of the Tirukkural. This also resulted in a resurgence in the publication of old commentaries written on Parimel's exegeses by various publishers.

== See also ==
- Ten Medieval Commentators
- Bhashya
- Commentaries in Tamil literary tradition
