= Thirumeni Rathna Kavirayar =

Tirumeni Rathna Kavirayar, known in full as Tirumeni Kaari Rathna Kavirayar, was a 16th-century Tamil scholar. He is known for his work Nunporul Maalai, a commentary on Parimelalhagar's commentary to the Kural text. His work is also the first in the series of commentaries appearing on Parimelalhagar's Kural commentary, known in the scholarly circle as uraikku urai (commentaries to the Commentary).

== Works ==
Kavirayar's work on the Parimelalhagar commentary to the Kural text is considered one of the finest works on the subject. According to M. Shanmugam Pillai, Kavirayar titled his work Nunporul Maalai, which literally means "garland to the work of subtle meanings", because it elaborates on the finest interpretations found in Parimelalhagar's commentary on the Kural literature. According to E. Sundaramurthy, former vice-chancellor of the Tamil University, the Nunporul Maalai lists divergent interpretations, who explains that such differences, if based on genuine academic grounds, are part of research methodology.

Kavirayar has also authored similar work on the Tolkappiyam, which is titled Tolkappiya Nunporul Maalai. However, this work is completely lost now.

== Legacy ==
Kavirayar's work has inspired several scholars after him, each of whom wrote highly praised commentaries on Parimelalhagar's work worthy of critical analysis. These scholars include Saravanaperumal Iyer, Murugesa Mudaliyar, Ramanuja Kavirayar, K. Vadivelu Chettiar, Arasan Shanmuganar, Kuppuswamy Mudaliyar, and V. M. Gopalakrishnamachariyar.

== See also ==
- Commentaries in Tamil literary tradition
