= Nacchar =

Medieval Indian literary scholar of the Tamil language

- Other names: Nakkar
- Occupations: Poet; scholar; commentator
- Era: c. 11th century CE
- Known for: Commentary on the Thirukkural

Nacchar (c. 11th century CE), also known as Nakkar, was a Tamil poet, scholar, and commentator known for his commentary on the Thirukkural. He was among the canon of ten medieval commentators of the Kural text most highly esteemed by modern scholars. However, his work has been lost along with other four ancient commentators, namely, Dhamatthar, Dharumar, Thirumalaiyar, and Mallar.

== Biography ==
Nacchar is often incorrectly believed by some as Nachinarkiniyar, another medieval Tamil poet. However, several scholars deny this, citing that an ancient verse praising the poet Nachinarkiniyar does not mention that he has written commentary on the Tirukkural. Moreover, Nachinarkiniyar lived in the 14th century, about three centuries later than Nacchar. Scholars also opine that the similarity between the two names lead to this incorrect conclusion by some.

== See also ==
- Ten Medieval Commentators
- Bhashya
- Commentaries in Tamil literary tradition
