= Yerambam =

Ancient Indian mathematical treatise

Yerambam (Tamil: ஏரம்பம்) was an ancient Indian mathematical treatise in the Tamil language. It was among the few ancient Tamil works on mathematics such as the work of Kanakkadhigaram and the manuscripts of Kilvaai and Kulimaattru.

== The work ==
Yerambam was one of the works in the corpus of ancient Tamil mathematical works, which includes several other works such as Kilaralaabam, Adhisaram, Kalambagam, Thribuvana Thilagam, Kanidha Rathinam, and Sirukanakku. In addition to these, there were two other works for which the name of the author is known: Kanakku Nool by Kaakkai Paadiniyaar and Kanakkadhigaram by Kaarinaayanar.

Kaarinaayanar cites Yerambam and the six other works in the ancient corpus as the sources of his work Kanakkadhigaram. Yerambam is also explicitly mentioned by name by Parimelalhagar in his commentary on Thirukkural.

According to Devaneya Pavanar, the work is completely lost to modern times.

== See also ==
- Kaṇakkatikāram
- Kaṇita Tīpikai
- Tamil literature
