= Ramanuja Kavirayar =

Ramanuja Kavirayar (1780, Ramanathapuram – 1853, Madras) was a Tamil savant and poet. Living in Madras, he dominated the world of Tamil letters and had several eminent Tamil scholars as his students.

Ramanuja Kavirayar pioneered the work of bringing Tamil classics into print for the first time, and wrote commentaries on some of them. He was also a poet. His greatest service, however, like that of Minakshisundaram Pillai, was as a teacher of Tamil. He trained a band of fine native Tamil scholars and was guru or munshi (the term then current to denote language teachers) to many of the European Tamil scholars in Madras between 1820 and 1853.

== Early life ==
Few details of Ramanuja Kavirayar's early life are known. His father was one Rangien as stated in a verse at the end of a Tamil translation of a Sanskrit work called Atmabodham. Ramanujam was a contemporary of Ashtavadhanam Peria Saravanaperumal Kavirayar of Ramanathapuram. Both of them learnt Tamil from Somasundaram Pillai, who was a well-learned and religious man and was one of the 12 personal disciples of the celebrated Sivagnana Swamigal.

After a thorough study of Tamil literature and grammar, Ramanuja Kavirayar came to Madras in 1820 and settled down as a teacher and man of letters working with single-minded devotion and enthusiasm, till his death in 1853, for the cause of Tamil learning and Tamil culture. He taught Tamil to many students and also published several books of his own and others, for which, it is stated, he had control of a printing press. He soon gained fame for his scholarship and came to be referred to as Ilakkanakkadal and lyarramilasiriyar.

Among his many eminent pupils were Visakhaperumal Aiyar and his half-brother Saravanaperumal Aiyar. Vishakaperumal Aiyar attained fame as an editor and commentator and was for several years the head of Tamil Department of the Madras University. Saravanaperumal Aiyar was also an equally well-known scholar, blessed with a philosophical bent of mind and such catholicity of outlook that he sang a brilliant Nanmanimalai on the great Muslim-mystic and Tamil poet Gunangudi Masthan.

Of Ramanuja Kavirayar's European Tamil students, the most prominent were George Uglow Pope, Miron Winslow, William Hoyles Drew and C. T. E. Rhenius. All were Christian missionaries devoted to the cause of Tamil studies. He not only taught them Tamil literature and grammar, but also collaborated with them in some of their important works. Ramanuja Kavirayar's role in the preparation of Winslow's (1862) English-Tamil dictionary is acknowledged in Winslow's preface: "In the preparation of this work, the compiler has been aided at different times by competent natives. Of these the first was Ramanuja Kavirayar." Ramanuja Kavirayar helped William Henry Drew in his English translation of the first two books of the Thirukkural, which Kavirayar himself brought out with his own special notes and Parimelalhagar's gloss. G. U. Pope has given currency to an interesting story relating to Ramanuja Kavirayar, which throws some light on his early life.

My first teacher of Tamil (Ramanuja Kavirayar) was a most learned scholar long dead (peace to his ashes) who possessed more than any man I have known, the cleverness, ingenium perfervidum. He was a profound and zealous Vaishnavite. I remarked one day about a long white line or scar on his neck, where his rosary of Eleocarpus beads are hung and ventured to ask him (I had to wait for such occasions for the mollia temporafandi) its history. Well, said he, "When I was a boy I could learn nothing. Nothing was clear to me and I could remember nothing. But I felt my whole soul full of intense love of learning. So in despair, I went to a temple of Saraswathi (the goddess of learning) and with a passionate prayer, I cut my throat and fell bleeding at her feet. In a vision she appeared to me and promised I should become the greatest of Tamil scholars. I recovered, and from that day, by her grace I found all things easy and I am what she said I should be. I believe he was so and from that noble, enthusiastic teacher I learnt to love Tamil and to reverence its ancient professors."

— George Uglow Pope, writing from Oxford in England in 1886

This story of Pope explains in some measure the background for Ramanuja Kavirayar's consciousness of his high mission as a dedicated teacher endowed with a domineering even aggressive nature, which evoked a natural reaction among his compeers.

For more than 30 years, Ramanuja Kavirayar was in the forefront of an illustrious band of Tamil scholars of Madras like Thandavaraya Mudaliar, Kanchipuram Sabhapathy Mudaliar, Kazhathur Vedagiri Mudaliar, Purasai Ashtavadhanam Sabhapathy Mudaliar, Ashtavadhanam Veeraswami Chettiar, Thiruvengatachala Mudaliar of Egmore, Visakhaperumal Aiyar and his brother, Mazhavai Mahalingam Aiyar and a host of others, who were the early pioneers in the great and formidable task of bringing the treasures of Tamil language, literature and grammar into print in the modern sense.

Ramanuja Kavirayar was greatly admired by his pupils, and respected by the most distinguished of his scholastic and intellectual opponents. Ironically, he occupied no recognisable official position and founded no school. Perhaps this was so because he simply said and wrote what seemed to him to be exact and true, in his own unemphatic, careful prose, with all the qualifications that the truth seemed to demand.

He did not modify or shape his thought to make it fit into a system. He did not exaggerate or over-schematise in order to obtain or attract attention for his ideas. He had an acute, ironical humour, was obstinate under attack, and could not be either snubbed or bullied. Yet he was courteous, serious and charming, and his movements and words possessed a dignity and humanity wholly unrelated to the popular image of him in the last 30 years of his life.

== Ramanuja Kavirayar’s commentaries ==
Pride of place amongst Ramanuja Kavirayar's commentaries should go to that on Nannool, known as Ramanuja Kandigai. Nannool was a grammatical masterpiece written by Pavanandi Munivar, a Jain ascetic, around the late 12th or early 13th century AD which has been held in high esteem by Tamil poets and scholars ever since. Nannool still continues to hold its own as a major work despite the attempts of some purists recently to discredit it. By writing an excellent commentary on it, and making its knowledge easily available in an intelligible manner to Tamil students, Ramanuja Kavirayar rendered a rare and distinct service, especially when we bear in mind the fact that the two earlier Commentaries on the Nannool, one by Mylainathar in the 14th century and the other by Sankaranamasivaya Pulavar in the 18th century had not then seen the light of day.

The story goes that Ramanajua Kavirayar's disciple Visakhaperumal Aiyar forestalled his master by publishing an elaborate gloss on Nannool earlier and this somewhat estranged their relationship. In his life of Meenakshi Sundaram Pillai, Dr U. V. Swaminatha Iyer says that Ramanuja Kavirayar often used to make slighting remarks about Visakhaperumal Aiyar and that at one stage Visakhaperumal Aiyar's student Mazhavai Mahalinga Aiyar had to begin a campaign of retaliation against Ramanuja Kavirayar in order to defend his guru. This anecdote only reveals the human element in great men, who are sometimes not free from minor foibles.

Ramanuja Kavirayar also wrote commentaries on the minor ethical works of Aathichoodi and Konraivendan of Avvaiyar. Though the maxims of Avvaiyar are short, yet some of them, on account of their extreme brevity and enigmatic expression are like Sutras requiring elaborate elucidation which was done with great force and clarity by Kavirayar.

== Poetry ==
Valuable as his commentaries have been, Ramanuja Kavirayar will be best remembered by his poems. He wrote three devotional poems: Thiruvengadavar Anubhuthi on Lord Venkatesa of Tirupati, Parthasarathy Padampunai Pamalai on God Parthasarathy of Triplicane, and Varadarajar Padirrupa-thanthadi on the Lord of the famous temple of Kanchipuram.

The resonating echoes of the hymns of the great Alwars can be heard in all these poems. They are in simple and beautiful language, expressing fervent ‘Bhakti’ in a mood of self-surrender to the Lord. If only he had devoted more time to poetry and composed more works of this kind, he would have been among the notable poets of that age. Some stray poems including a Pancharatnamala on Pachaiyappa Mudaliar, the great philanthropist, also stand to the credit of Kavirayar.

== See also ==
- Commentaries in Tamil literary tradition
