= Umapathi Shivachariyar =

- Born: 13th century CE; Tamil Nadu, India
- Died: 14th century CE
- Occupation: Poet
- Writing career
- Language: Tamil
- Period: 13th century CE
- Notable works: Sekkizhar Nayanar Puranam, Sankarpa Nirakaranam, Valluvar Seer

Umapathi Shivachariyar (13th century–14th century CE) was a Tamil poet and scholar. It is from his writings that details about earlier poets, chiefly Parimelalhagar, have become known.

== Works ==
Umapati Sivacharya celebrated the life of the Saivite saint Sekkizhar in his 1313 CE work called Sekkizhar Nayanar Puranam. In 1323 CE, he authored the work Sankarpa Nirakaranam. This is known by his indication of the year as Sagam 1235 within the work of Sankarpa Nirakaranam. This translates to 1323 CE in the modern Gregorian calendar. In one of his venpa poetries named "Valluvar Seer", he mentions about Parimelalhagar indicating his commentary of the Tirukkural. This indicates that Parimelalhagar lived before Shivachariyar.

== See also ==
- Ten Medieval Commentators
