= Dharumar =

Medieval Indian literary scholar of the Tamil language

Dharumar (c. 11th to 13th century CE) was a Tamil poet, scholar, and commentator known for his commentary on the Thirukkural. He was among the canon of Ten Medieval Commentators of the Kural text most highly esteemed by modern scholars. His work, however, has been lost along with other four ancient commentators, namely, Dhamatthar, Nacchar, Thirumalaiyar, and Mallar. He was also one of the three ancient commentators of the Naladiyar.

== Biography ==
There is not much known about Dharumar. Dharumar is believed to have lived around 11th to 13th century CE. Apart from the Tirukkural, Dharumar has also written commentary to Naladiyar.

== See also ==
- Ten Medieval Commentators
- Bhashya
- Commentaries in Tamil literary tradition
