= Mallar (poet) =

Medieval Indian literary scholar of the Tamil language

Mallar (c. 11 to 13th century CE) was a Tamil poet, scholar, and commentator known for his commentary on the Thirukkural. He was among the canon of Ten Medieval Commentators of the Kural text most highly esteemed by modern scholars. His work, however, has been lost along with other four ancient commentators, namely, Dhamatthar, Nacchar, Thirumalaiyar, and Dharumar.

Similar to the commentaries by Parithiyar, Pariperumal, and Kaalingar, Mallar's commentary is believed to have been originated in the Kongu Region.

== See also ==
- Ten Medieval Commentators
- Bhashya
- Commentaries in Tamil literary tradition
