= Thondaimandala Sadhagam =

Thondaimandala Sadhagam தொண்டைமண்டல சதகம்
- Author: Padikkaasu Pulavar
- Language: Medieval Tamil
- Subject: Tamil grammar
- Genre: Poetry
- Set in: 17th century CE
- Publication place: India

Thondaimandala Sadhagam (Tamil: தொண்டைமண்டல சதகம்) is a 17th-century Tamil work of the type known as sadhagam. It was authored by Padikkaasu Pulavar. He was under the aegis of Muslim patron Seethakkadhi. The work deals with the folk events that happened in the ancient Tondaimandalam region (modern-day Kanchipuram) of the modern Indian state of Tamil Nadu. The book is a compilation of information that are either obtained by first account or gathered by word of mouth and then compiled as poetry. The other works by the author include Thandalaiyar Sadhagam and Kongumandala Sadhagam.

The work gives the account of Parimelalhagar living in the city of Kancheepuram. Verse 41 of the Thondaimandala Sadhagam says that "Parimelalhagar of Kancheepuram served as beacon to the Kural."

== See also ==
- Tamil literature
