= Asthana Kolahalam =

Two different Tamil mathematics books

Title page of "Asthana Kolahalam" published by Sarasvati Mahal Library in 2004

Asthana Kolahalam is the title of two different Tamil books both dealing with elementary mathematics but with totally different contents. One of them was published by Government Oriental Manuscripts Library (GOML), Madras (now Chennai) in 1951 with 167 pages and the other published by Saraswathi Mahal Library (SML), Thanjavur, Tamil Nadu, in 2004 with 306 pages. Both books are based on old palm-leaf manuscripts with the same title composed in the form of verses and both contain explanations and illustrative examples.

The title "Asthana Kolahalam" may be literally translated as "assembly room (royal audience place) uproar" and the term "uproar" suggests making the audience happy, jovial and cheerful.

== GOML's "Asthana Kolahalam" ==
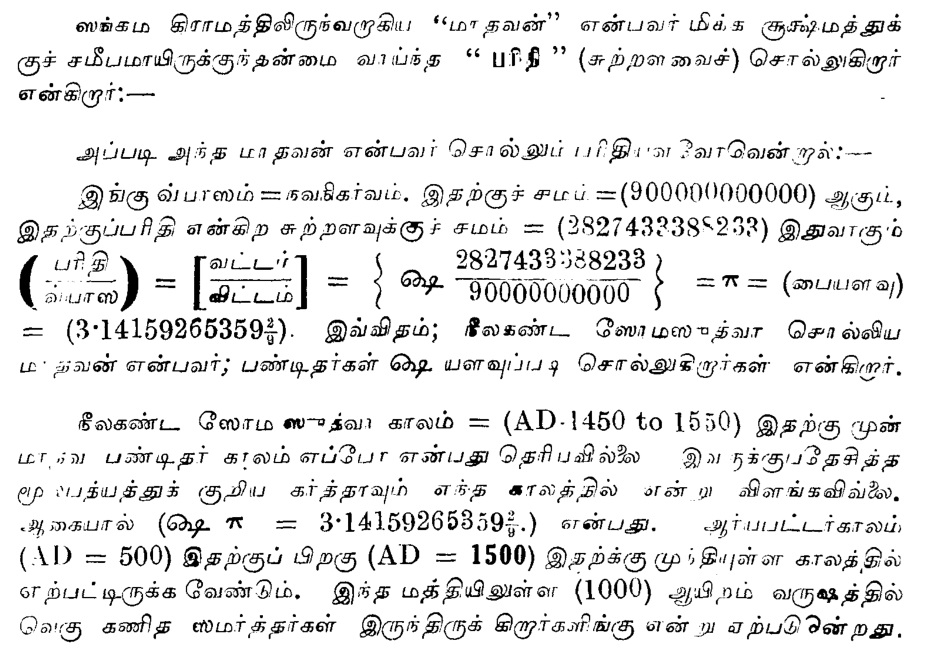
An extract from page 55 of GOML's "Asthana Kolahalam" showing Saṅgamagrāma Mādhava's value of pi

GOML's "Asthana Kolahalam" publication is based on a single palm-leaf manuscript submitted to GOML in 1921 by one Sankaravenkataramayyangar of Periyakulam. The work contains 57 stanzas of various meters including an invocation stanza. These stanzas specify rules for carrying out elementary arithmetical operations.

One interesting feature of this work is that bulk of the work has been devoted to discussing topics in mathematics not contained in the various stanzas of the original manuscript. After completing the explanation of stanza 46 in page 52, the editor embarks on a grand detour of various topics in mathematics and returns to stanza 47 only in page 140. The context for this digression is apparently the value of the mathematical constant pi. The topics covered in this detour include the history of the computations of the value of pi (incidentally, he mentions Sangamagrama Madhava's approximate value of pi also, namely the value 2827433388233/(9 × 10^{11}) ), the various trigonometric functions, formula for the area of a circle, formulas for the surface area and volume of cones, cylinders, etc., formulas for the circumference and area of ellipses, Pythagorean theorem and several related geometrical problems.

== SML's "Asthana Kolahalam" ==
SML's "Asthana Kolahalam" is a work compiled from three different palm leaf manuscripts kept in SML, all having the same title. There are altogether 92 verses in the work. As per one of the verses in the text, the author of the work is Naviliperumal, son of Nagan. The date of composition of the manuscripts has not been determined. This publication carries detailed explanations of the various verses by K. Sathyabhama.

== See also ==
- Kanakkusaram
- Kaṇita Tīpikai
- Kaṇakkatikāram
