= Kanakkusaram =

Kaṇakkusāraṃ is a comprehensive treatise in Manipravalam (a hybrid language which combines Sanskrit lexicon and Malayalam morpho-syntax), composed in the 16th-17th century CE, dealing with elementary arithmetic and methods for solving arithmetical problems arising in the everyday life of members of an agricultural community. The book was composed by one Nīlakṇṭha; but other than the name, nothing more definite is known about the author. The date of composition of the book has also not been determined. The significance of the work is that it was composed in a variant of the local vernacular language addressing the needs of ordinary people and it is one of the earliest such work in Malayalam. In comparison, Yuktibhasha, composed in pure Malayalam and published in the middle of the sixteenth century, is an advanced text on mathematics and astronomy addressed to the advanced students and scholars of mathematics. The book is composed in verses and it also contains a commentary both in Manipravalam language. In the book, the author has claimed that the work is based on Sanskrit texts like Bhaskara II's Līlāvatī and older Malayalam texts on mathematics like Kaṇakkadhikāraṃ.

There are two versions of the work: one of them is titled simply Kaṇakkusāraṃ while the other is titled Kaṇakkusāraṃ (Bālaprabodhaṃ). Both have been published by Government Oriental Manuscript Library, Madras (Chennai) in 1950 critically edited with introductions by C. Achyutha Menon. There are some differences in content between the two versions. According to Achyutha Menon the versions are likely to be of different authorship though both might have borrowed material from a common source.

== Contents ==
The original manuscripts of both versions of Kaṇakkusāraṃ had no division into chapters. It was one continuous text from beginning to end. However, at the time of publication of the work by Government Oriental Manuscript Library, the editor of the book C. Achyutha Menon divided it into chapters based on the nature of contents.

Chapter 1: Names for numbers less than one and greater than one; measurements of volume, weight, time
Chapter 2: Rule of three (mathematics)
Chapter 3: Rule of five
Chapter 4: Rules of seven and nine
Chapter 5: Calculations in respect of gold
Chapter 6: Calculations in respect of timber, wages for spade work, grain transactions, house building, land tenure, masonry, ground measurement

== See also ==
- Asthana Kolahalam
- Kaṇita Tīpikai
- Kaṇakkatikāram
