= Kaviraja Pandithar =

Indian scholar of the Tamil language

- Born: Jagavira Pandiyan; 10 March 1886; Ottanattham, Tirunalveli district, Madras Presidency (present-day Thoothukudi, Tamil Nadu), India
- Died: 17 June 1967 (aged 81); Madurai, Tamil Nadu, India
- Occupation: Tamil scholar
- Known for: Commentary on the Tirukkural
- Parents: Perumalswamy (father); Aavudaiyammal (mother)

Jagavira Pandiyanar (10 March 1886–17 June 1967), commonly known as Kaviraja Pandithar (Tamil: கவிராச பண்டிதர் செகவீர பாண்டியனார்), was a 20th-century Indian scholar of the Tamil language, who is known for his commentary on the Tirukkural.

== Early life ==
Kaviraja Pandithar was born on 10 March 1886 in the small town of Ottanattham in the present-day Thoothukudi district of the state of Tamil Nadu. He was a descendant of the Indian freedom fighter Veerapandiya Kattabomman. He studied Tamil under Muthukavirayar. He was well known for his discourses of the Puranas. His works ranged from poetry to prose and translations. He lived in Melamasi Street of Madurai.

Kaviraja Pandithar's commentary on the Kural text is considered a classic by modern scholars, besides that of U. V. Swaminatha Iyer.

== Works ==
Kaviraja Pandithar's works were nationalized in 2010–2011 by the Tamil Nadu government and offered an amount of ₹ 600,000.

The works of Kaviraja Pandithar include the following:

S. No.	Year	Name of the work	Publisher	Notes
01	1927	Tirukkural Kumaresa Venba		8 volumes
02		Kamban Kavinilai Urainadai (Prose)		15 volumes
03		Agatthiya Munivar		
04		Veerapandiyam		An epic compilation of oral accounts about Panchalankurichi's polygar Veerapandiya Kattabomman
05		Panchalankurichi Veeracharithiram		A history of Veerapandiya Kattabomman (two volumes)
06	1945	Thmilar Veeram		
07		Maasilamani Maalai		
08		Ani Arubadhu		
09		Dharma Deepikai		7 volumes
10		Indhiya Thaainilai		
11		Veerakaaviyam		
12		Kavigalin Kaathchi Volume-1		
13		Kalvi Nilai		

== See also ==
- Commentaries in Tamil literary tradition
