= K. Vadivelu Chettiar =

K. Vadivelu Chettiar (1863–1936) was a Tamil scholar of the early twentieth century. He is best known for his exegesis on the Parimelalhagar's commentary to the Tirukkural.

== Biography ==
Chettiar was born in 1863 and was a merchant in Chintadripet in Chennai, where he was running a grocery store selling cigars. His interest in the Tamil language and literature was kindled by the Tamil scholar Ramanuja Naicker who was one of his regular customers. Soon Chettiar launched into a regular exposition of Tamil literary works at his grocery store, absorbing several stanzas of Tamil poetry recited by Naicker while smoking his cigar.

Soon he lost interest in his family vocation and instead took to studying Tamil from various scholars under the guise of purchasing provisions from the Kothawal Chavadi market in the city. This made him pursue a career as a Tamil pundit in the Hindu Theological Society High School. Eventually, he emerged as one of the greatest scholars of his time. In 1904, he published his work on the Tirukkural, which included, along with his own commentary, notes of medieval commentator Parimelazhagar. With his knowledge in Sanskrit literature, he had also quoted from works such as Bhagavad Gita, the Upanishads, and the Manusmriti. The work was praised by contemporary scholars including U. Ve. Swaminatha Iyer, Maraimalai Adigal, Vaiyapuri Pillai, Ra. Raghava Iyengar, Thiru Vi Ka and Mu. Varadarajan.

The book was republished in 1919 by Chettiyar's disciple T. P. Meenakshisundaram with his own English renderings. Chettiar had also published his notes for Sivagnana Bodham with his own commentary. Chettiar died in 1936.

In 2015, Chettiar's Tirukkural translation was republished in two volumes running into 2,500 pages.

== See also ==
- Commentaries in Tamil literary tradition
