= T. P. Meenakshisundaram =

Indian academic (1901–1980)

- Born: 8 January 1901; Thenpattinam, Chengelput district, India
- Died: 27 August 1980 (aged 79)
- Other name: Te Po Meenkshisunadaranar
- Occupations: Writer; Academic
- Years active: 1923–1980
- Known for: Tamil and English literature
- Parent: S. Ponnusami Gramani
- Awards: Padma Bhushan; TN Sahitya Akademi Award

Thenpattinam Ponnuswamy Meenakshisundaram (8 January 1901 – 27 August 1980), popularly known as Te Po Meenkshisunadaranar, was an Indian scholar, writer of Tamil and English literature and the founder and vice chancellor of Madurai Kamaraj University.

== Life ==
Born on 8 January 1901 at Thenpattinam, in the erstwhile Chengelput district of the south Indian state of Tamil Nadu to S. Ponnusami Gramani, Meenakshisundaram did his college studies at Pachaiyappa's College from where he secured his BA (1920), BL (1922), MA in history (1923) and a Diploma in Economics. After starting his career in 1923 as a lawyer and serving the Madras Corporation Council in 1924, he shifted his career as a professor of Tamil and served Annamalai University from 1954 to 1958 and the Presidency College, Chennai till 1961. He was serving as the director of the Center for Advanced Study in Dravidian Linguistics of Annamalai University when he was appointed as the founder vice chancellor of Madurai Kamaraj University in 1966, a post he held till 1971.

Meenakshisundaram published several works in Tamil and English. He is best known for his English renderings of the Tirukkural published in 1919, in which he republished the work of his mentor Vadivelu Chettiar, appending it with his own English renderings. His notable works include Philosophy of Tiruvalluvar, A history of Tamil Language, A history of Tamil Literature, and Aesthetics of the Tamils. He was a recipient of several honors such as the Tamil Nadu Sahitya Akademi Award (1975), and honorary doctorates from Madurai Kamaraj University (1967), University of Colombo (1973) and Annamalai University (1976). The Government of India awarded him the third highest civilian honour of the Padma Bhushan, in 1977, for his contributions to literature and education. He died on 27 August 1980, at the age of 79. Madurai Kamaraj University has since instituted an endowment prize, Dr T. P. Meenakshisundaram Endowment Prize, in his honor.

== See also ==
- Madurai Kamaraj University
