= Kaṇita Tīpikai =

Tamil language book about Arithmetic

Kaṇita Tīpikai (Gaṇita Dīpika) is a Tamil book authored by Paṇṭala Rāmasvāmi Nāykkar and published in 1825 dealing with arithmetic. It is the first Tamil book on mathematics ever to be printed and it is the first Tamil book ever to introduce the symbol for zero and also to discuss the decimal place value notation or positional notation using Tamil numerals. Iravatham Mahadevan, a well known Indian epigraphist, and M. V. Bhaskar noted thus in an article published in The Hindu in December 2011: "The convention of using symbols for 10, 100, and 1000 in expressing the higher numerals was current in Tamil Nadu until the advent of printing and the adoption of the international form of Indian numerals with place-value system." Senthi Babu D, a historian and researcher attached to the French Institute of Pondicherry, observes:

"Pantulu Ramasamy Naicker authored the first modern arithmetic textbook in Tamil, called the “Kanita Teepikai”, sponsored by the company state, in the year 1825. Interestingly, in his ‘payiram’ to the textbook, he justifies the use of both ‘Aryan language’ and “a bit of kotuntamil” for the sake of “understanding of all”. Ramasamy, one can see, had taken great pains to introduce the notation for zero in Tamil as “0”, which directly brought him to the issue of explaining the concept of place value in numbers. When he had to introduce the concept that the value of a number increases by factors of ten on the left, but decreases when it proceeds to the right, his plea to the reader is to follow the rule as it is a ‘decision of God’."

== Full text ==
The full text of the book is available for free download in Internet Archive: Kanita Dipikai (1825). Pantala Ramasvami Naykkar. Madras: Vepery Mission Press.

== See also ==
- Asthana Kolahalam
- Kaṇakkatikāram
- Kanakkusaram
