= Tirutthanigai Saravanaperumal Aiyar =

Tamil scholar

- Born: Saravanaperumal; 1799
- Died: 19th Century
- Occupation: Tamil scholar
- Known for: Commentary on the Tirukkural and Tiruvalluva Maalai
- Father: Thanigai Kanthappaiyar

Tirutthanigai Saravanaperumal Aiyar (1799–19th century CE) was a Tamil scholar, best known for his commentary on the Tirukkural and other Tamil classics.

== Biography ==
Saravanaperumal Aiyar was the son of great Tamil scholar named Thanigai Kanthappaiyar. The family hailed from Thiruthani and hence the name "Thanigai" became part of the family's names. Kanthappaiyar moved to Purasawalkam in Chennai. It is said that Scholar Kachiyappa Sivachariyar wrote Vinayakapuranam in the Purasawalkam house of Kanthappaiyar. Unlike the title "Aiyar" in their names suggest, the Kanthappaiyar family were not Brahmins but Veera Saivites. Saravanaperumal was the contemporary of Ramalinga Vallalar.

Saravanaperumal's elder twin brother Vishakaperumal Aiyar too was a renowned Tamil scholar who worked in the Tamil department of the Presidency College in Chennai. His contributions include a poem written as an introduction to his brother's work. He had a collection of many rare books which were later used by U. V. Swaminatha Iyer.

== Works ==
Saravanaperumal's greatest work was his detailed commentary on the Tirukkural. This was the first modern commentary to appear in print. He published the commentary in 1830 as an adaptation of Parimelalhagar’s commentary, with word-to-word meaning, brief explanation, and special explanatory text. However, the 1830 edition is lost and the oldest available edition was a copy published in 1847. The work came out in several editions (at least eight) until 1928 and became one of the most accepted commentary among academic scholars. Many modern commentaries are based on the work of Saravanaperumal Aiyar.

Saravanaperumal also wrote the first commentary to the Tiruvalluva Maalai.

== See also ==
- Commentaries in Tamil literary tradition
