= Purapporul Venbamaalai =

Medieval Tamil text by Iyyanarithanar

Purapporul Venbamaalai புறப்பொருள் வெண்பாமாலை
- Author: Iyyanarithanar
- Language: Medieval Tamil
- Subject: Tamil grammar
- Genre: Poetry
- Set in: 9th century CE
- Publication place: India

Purapporul Venbamaalai (Tamil: புறப்பொருள் வெண்பாமாலை) is a medieval Tamil text on the grammar of the puram (lit. "external") genre of the Tamil literature. Authored by Iyyanarithanar, the work is dated to around the 9th century CE. It is one of the work for which the author himself has written an exegesis. The work is considered the only work on the puram genre after the Tolkappiyam. The work is extensively quoted by later scholars, including the Ilampooranar (12th century), Nacchinarkkiniyar, and others.

== The work ==
The work divides the puram element into 12 parts, known as thinais. These thinais are grouped under three categories. Each thinais is subdivided into various divisions called thurais. Each thinai has a verse known as suthiram (lit. "formula") that summarizes all the thurais. There are 19 such suthirams in the work. Each thurai has a couplet, called the kolu that explains the thurai. There are 342 such kolus (verses) in the work. The work is considered to be based on the Pannirupadalam, an ancient work attributed to the 12 disciples of Sage Agasthya.

== See also ==
- Tamil literature
