= Nachinarkiniyar =

Medieval Indian scholar of the Tamil language

Nacciṉārkkiṉiyar (நச்சினார்க்கினியர்), also spelled Naccinarkkiniyar or Nachinarkiniyar, was a 14th-century Tamil and Sanskrit scholar famous for his commentaries on Sangam literature and post-Sangam medieval Tamil literature. His commentary on some of the most studied Tamil texts such as the Tolkappiyam, Kuruntokai and Civaka Cintamani have guided scholarship that followed him, including modern era studies of Tamil literature. According to Kamil Zvelebil, a Tamil literature scholar, Naccinarkiniyar had a "keen poetic sense, awareness of word values". He vividly analyzed the primary text and secondary literature on that primary text, in a sophisticated impartial manner seen in modern era scholarship. He paid attention to minute details with a critical observation, states Zvelebil, and Naccinarkiniyar's work shows "a clear mind and a vast erudition" of Tamil and Sanskrit works.

Naccinarkiniyar was a Brahmin of the Shaivism tradition of Hinduism. Nacinarkiniyar wrote commentaries on the Tolkāppiyam, Pattuppāṭṭu, Kaliththokai, Kuṟuntokai and Civaka Cintamani.

== See also ==
- Ten Medieval Commentators
- Commentaries in Tamil literary tradition
