= Kaṇakkatikāram =

Tamil mathematics book

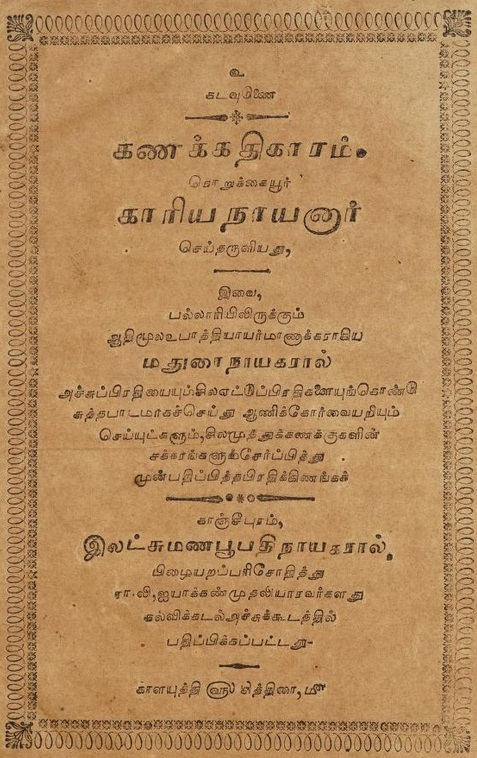
Cover page of Kaṇakkatikāram published in 1859 (Internet Archive)

Kaṇakkatikāram is a Tamil mathematics book believed to have been written by Kari Nayanar hailing from Korakaiyur in Cholanad. Considering the internal evidences, the work has been dated to 15th century CE. "It is significant that the mathematical methods found in these delve into the material life of the people and approach the dimensions of daily labor enumeratively." According to the author, the contents of the book are based on material available in standard Sanskrit treatises on mathematics like 'Līlāvatī".

== Kaṇakkatikāram in Malayalam ==
Kaṇakkatikāram was popular in Kerala also and it had been in wide use as a textbook for teaching arithmetic to children in the elementary schools in Kerala during the pre-Independence era. A team of researchers at ETH Zurich unearthed as many as nineteen Malayalam manuscripts of Kaṇakkatikāram from different manuscript depositories in Kerala. According these researchers, there is not much common content in these manuscripts except one or two introductory verses and some lists of units of measurements. None of the manuscripts contain any author attribution or any clue to the date of their composition. Because of the variety and diversity of contents in the manuscripts, the researchers suggest that the purported title Kaṇakkatikāram of the works may not be the actual title of a work but might be the name of a genre of work in Malayalam. Regarding the date of composition of the work, the researchers observe thus: "the evidence in this verse and the linguistic evidence detailed above may lead to the conjecture that the Malayalam Kaṇakkatikāram originated around the fifteenth century, somewhere in the Palakkad region, perhaps in the context of merchants that connected the Malabar Coast with Tamil Nadu via the Pallakad Gap. However, this may be a hasty conclusion. The distribution and variety of the manuscripts and the geographical spread of the educational and commercial networks that carried them do not compel us to assume a unified source or origin. Instead, we may surmise that different verses came from different times and places, and were constantly recombined, re-edited and renewed by local teachers and practitioners who created new Kaṇakkatikāram compilations."

A Malayalam adaptation of work with some additional mathematical material and explanations, authored by Mavanan Mappila Seyd Muhammed Asan, was printed and published by CMS Press Kottayam in 1863. The title of the Malayalam version of the book is Kaṇakkadhikāram.

== Contents ==
Kaṇakkatikāram deals with the arithmetical calculations that are likely to be required in the daily life of ordinary people. For example, it deals with computations involving quantitative measurements of paddy, wood, other agricultural produce, land, gold, etc. and also the computations of the daily, monthly wages of field workers, etc. The Malayalam version has a 54-page preamble devoted to explaining the notations for whole numbers, fractions and multiplication tables for whole numbers and fractions.

== Full texts ==
- A version of the Malayalam Kaṇakkatikāram based on available manuscripts with English translation and detailed explanatory notes: Arun Ashokan, Naresh Keerthi, P. M. Vrinda and Roy Wagner (May 2024). Draft of an edition of Kaṇakkatikāram (PDF). ETH Zurich.
- A palm leaf manuscript of Kaṇakkatikāram is available at the British Library. A scanned copy of the folios of the manuscript can be viewed at: "கணக்கதிகாரம் (Kanakkatikaram)". eap.bl.uk. The British Library. (made available as part of the Endangered Archives Programme of the British Library)
- An old print of Kaṇakkatikāram: Kari Nayanar (1859). Kaṇakkatikāram. Kalvikkaṭal Accukkūṭam.
- A modern printing of Kaṇakkatikāram: Kaṇakkatikāram (Internet Archive)
- Kaṇakkatikāram (Tamil Digital Library)
- For the Malayalam version of Kaṇakkatikāram: Mavanan Mappila Seyd Muhammed Asan (1863). Kanakkadhikaram. Kottayam: C. M. S. Press.
- For a modern book with the same title Kaṇakkatikāram authored by K. Sathyabhama and P. Subrahmanian:Kaṇakkatikāram

== See also ==
- Asthana Kolahalam
- Kaṇita Tīpikai
- Kanakkusaram
