= Ten Medieval Commentators =

The Ten Medieval Commentators (Tamil: உரையாசிரியர்கள் பதின்மர்) were a canonical group of Tamil scholars whose commentaries on the ancient Indian didactic work of the Kural are esteemed by later scholars as worthy of critical analysis. These scholars lived in the Medieval era between the 10th and 13th centuries CE. Among these medieval commentaries, the commentaries of Manakkudavar, Kaalingar, and Parimelalhagar are considered pioneer by modern scholars.

== Commentaries ==
"Valluvar is a cunning technician, who, by prodigious self-restraint and artistic vigilance, super-charges his words with meaning and achieves an incredible terseness and an irreducible density. His commentators have, therefore, to squeeze every word and persuade it to yield its last drop of meaning."

— S. Maharajan, 1979.

The Kural remains the most reviewed work of the Tamil literature, with almost every scholar down the ages having written commentaries on it. Of the several hundred commentaries written on the didactic work over the centuries, the commentaries written by a group of ten medieval scholars are considered to have high literary value. The ten scholars are:

- Manakkudavar (c. 10th century CE)
- Dhamatthar (c. 11th century CE)
- Nacchar (c. 11th century CE)
- Paridhi (c. 11th century CE)
- Pariperumal, also known as Kaliperumal (c. 11th century CE)
- Thirumalaiyar (c. 11 to 13th century CE)
- Mallar (c. 11 to 13th century CE)
- Kaalingar (c. late 12th century CE)
- Dharumar (c. 13th century CE)
- Parimelalhagar (c. 13th century CE)

Of these, only the commentaries of Manakkudavar, Paridhi, Pariperumal, Kaalingar, and Parimelalhagar are extant in their complete (or almost complete) form. The commentaries of Dharumar, Dhamatthar, and Nacchar have survived only in fragmentary form, and those of Thirumalaiyar and Mallar are now lost completely. The oldest of these is the commentary of Manakkudavar (c. 10th century CE), which is considered to be the closest to the original text of the Kural, and is considered the cornerstone against which other medieval commentaries are compared in order to find variations in them. Each commentators followed his own sense of logic in the arrangement of the chapters and the couplets within them. Researchers have found as many as 16, 20, 120, and 171 variations in the ordering of the Kural couplets by Pari Perumal, Paridhi, Parimelalhagar, and Kaalingar, respectively, with respect to the commentary by Manakkudavar. According to M. Shanmugham Pillai, there are about 305 textual variations in all the commentaries combined. The last of these medieval commentaries is that of Parimelalhagar, who wrote the commentary around 1271–1272 CE, as indicated in an inscription at the Varadharaja Perumal Temple at Kanchipuram. Commentaries written by Paridhiyar, Pariperumal, Kaalingar, and Mallar have all been found in the Kongu Region.

Parimelalhagar's commentary is followed ever since as the standard for numbering of the Kural chapters and the couplets within each chapter.

== Chapter order variations ==
Valluvar wrote the Kural literature in three parts, namely, Book I, Book II, and Book III, containing a total of 133 chapters in all, without splitting the books further into any subdivisions. However, later scholars from both the Late Sangam period and the medieval era divided each book into various divisions known as iyal and grouped the chapters variously under each iyal. They also changed the ordering of the couplets within each chapter widely. These variations are not standard either but vary according to different commentators. While the variations in the ordering of the couplets according to various commentators are found across the work, variations in the grouping and ordering of chapters are found chiefly in the Book on Virtue (Book I).

The following table lists the variations between ordering of chapters in Book I by Manakkudavar (the oldest) and that by Parimelalhagar (the latest).

Manakkudavar's ordering		Parimelalhagar's ordering (followed today)	
Chapters under subdivision “Domestic virtues”: 5. Household life 6. The virtues of a wife 7. Offspring; 8. Loving-kindness; 9. Hospitality; 10. Not lying 11. Gratitude; 12. Impartiality; 13. Patience; 14. Right conduct 15. Not coveting another's wife 16. Refraining from anger 17. Ahimsa/Not doing harm 18. Not killing 19. Shunning meat-eating 20. Not stealing 21. Dread of evil deeds 22. Social duty 23. Generosity; 24. Glory	Chapters under subdivision “Ascetic virtues”: 25. Benevolence, mercy, and compassion 26. Kindness of speech 27. Self-control; 28. Austerities; 29. Hypocrisy; 30. Not envying 31. Not coveting another's goods 32. Not backbiting 33. Not uttering useless words 34. Impermanence; 35. Self-denial; 36. Realization of the truth 37. Rooting out desire	Chapters under subdivision “Domestic virtues”: 5. Household life 6. The virtues of a wife 7. Offspring; 8. Loving-kindness; 9. Hospitality; 10. Kindness of speech 11. Gratitude; 12. Impartiality; 13. Self-control; 14. Right conduct 15. Not coveting another's wife 16. Patience; 17. Not envying 18. Not coveting another's goods 19. Not backbiting 20. Not uttering useless words 21. Dread of evil deeds 22. Social duty 23. Generosity; 24. Glory	Chapters under subdivision “Ascetic virtues”: 25. Benevolence, mercy, and compassion 26. Shunning meat-eating 27. Austerities; 28. Hypocrisy; 29. Not stealing 30. Not lying 31. Refraining from anger 32. Ahimsa/Not doing harm 33. Not killing 34. Impermanence; 35. Self-denial; 36. Realization of the truth 37. Rooting out desire

The chapters "Shunning meat-eating," "Not stealing," "Not lying," "Refraining from anger," "Ahimsa," and "Non-killing", all of which originally appear under subsection "Domestic virtues" in Manakkudavar's version, appear under "Ascetic virtues" in Parimelalhagar's version. Similarly, the chapters "Kindness of speech," "Self-control," "Not envying," "Not coveting another’s goods," "Not backbiting," and "Not uttering useless words", which appear under "Ascetic virtues" in Manakkudavar's version, appear under "Domestic virtues" in Parimelalhagar's version. Given these subdivisions of domestic and ascetic virtues are later additions, both the domestic and ascetic virtues in the Book of Aṟam are addressed to the householder or commoner. Ascetic virtues in the Kural, according to A. Gopalakrishnan, do not mean renunciation of household life or pursuing of the conventional ascetic life, but only refer to giving up avarice and immoderate desires and maintaining self-control that is expected of every individual.

== Legacy ==
All these commentators lived in a time that is now known among literary scholars as "the golden age of Tamil prosaic literature". This era is also dubbed "the age of literary commentaries".

An old Tamil poem describes all these ten commentators thus:

Original: தருமர் மணக்குடவர் தாமத்தர் நச்சர் பரிதி பரிமே லழகர் திருமலையர் மல்லர் பரிப்பெருமாள் காலிங்கர் — வள்ளுவர்நூற்கு எல்லையுரை செய்தார் இவர்	Translation: Dharumar Manakkudavar Dhamatthar Nacchar; Paridhi Parimel alhagar Thirumalaiyar; Mallar Pariperumal Kaalingar — Wrote these For the Book of Valluvar faithful commentaries. (Perunthogai, line 1538)

== See also ==
- Tirukkural
- Commentaries in Tamil literary tradition
- Bhashya
