= Sivagyana Munivar =

Indian sage

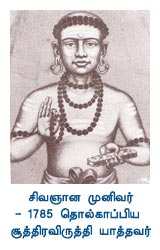

Sivagyana Munivar (c. 18th century) was a saivite sage and scholar from Tirunelveli, Tamil Nadu. He was well versed in both Tamil and Sanskrit.

== Biography ==
Sivagyana Murnivar was born Mukkalaalingar. He translated several Sanskrit works into Tamil. He was also known as Sri Madhava Sivagyana Munivar.

== Works ==
Sivagyana Munivar authored several texts and translated many. His magnum opus work remains the Sivagnana Mapadiam, an elaborate and critical interpretation of Sivagnanabodham, the work of the 13th-century CE scholar Meikandadevar. In his commentary to the Nannul, he revised and expanded the work of Shankara Namachivayar. Sivagyana Munivar is also known for his work Ilakkana Vilakka Sooravali, a rebuttal of Tiruvarur Vaidhyanatha Desikar's Ilakkana Vilakkam. This is perhaps the only work in the Tamil literature that serves as a refuting commentary on another work.

The following are his works:

- Tholkappiya Paayira Vruddhi
- Maapaadiyam
- Tiruthondar Tirunamakkovai
- Tirumullaivoyil Anthadhi
- Kulatthur Padhittrupatthu Anthadhi
- Somesar Mudhumoli Venba
- Ilasai Padhittrupatthu Anthadhi
- Tiruvegamparandhadhi
- Kacchi Anandha Rudresar Padhikam
- Anandha Kalippu
- Kanchi Puranam
- Mudharkaandam
- Kalaisai Padhittrupatthu Anthadhi
- Kalaisai Senkaluneer
- Vinayagar Pillai Tamil
- Amudhaambikai Pillai Tamil
- Akilandeshwarar Padhikam

His translated works include:

- Siddhanka Prakasikai
- Sloka Panchagam
- Tharkka Sankragam
- Sivathatva Vivegam

== See also ==
- Tirukkural
- Nannul
- List of translators
