= Muthollaayiram =

Muthollaayiram (Tamil: முத்தொள்ளாயிரம், literally "triple nine-hundred") is an ancient Tamil anthology, composed around the 5th century CE. The work consists of three sets of 900 verses each, making a total of 2,700 verses in all, sung in praise of the three ancient Tamil rulers of the Cheras, the Cholas, and the Pandyas. This is in line with an ancient Tamil custom of writing 900 verses to complete a work, as in several other works such as Vaccha Thollaayiram and Arumbai Thollaayiram. It tells about various characteristics of these ancient rulers, namely, land, fortification, army, fighting spirit, valour, generosity, and so forth. The author of the work is not known. Much of it has been lost, with only a small portion available. Out of the 2,700 verses, only 109 verses have been found.

== Publication of the work ==
M. Raghava Iyengar first published Muthollaayiram verses in 1905 in the magazine Senthamil. In 1938, S. Vaiyapuri Pillai, head of the Tamil research department at the University of Madras, published a book containing the verse collections of Muthollaayiram.

In 1943, S. Vaiyaapuri Pillai wrote in a journal opining that there could only be 300 songs on each rulers, making only 900 songs in total.

== Commentary ==
T. K. Chidhambaranadhar wrote a simple commentary to the verses of the Muthollaayiram. In the commentary, he indicated that the meaning of 9 verses remains murky and included those verses without any elaboration as an appendix in his commentary.

== See also ==
- Sangam literature
