= Nālaṭiyār =

Tamil poetic work

Naladiyar நாலடியார்
- Author: Various poets
- Working title: Naladiyar
- Language: Old Tamil
- Series: Patiṉeṇkīḻkaṇakku
- Subject: Secular ethics
- Genre: Poetry
- Published: Palm-leaf manuscript of the Tamil Sangam era (dated variously between 300 BCE and 3rd century CE)
- Publication place: India

The Nālaṭiyār (Tamil: நாலடியார்) is a classical Tamil Jain poetic work of didactic nature, forming part of the Eighteen Lesser Texts (Patiṉeṇkīḻkaṇakku) anthology of Tamil literature. It consists of four hundred quatrains that impart moral teachings and ethical reflections, consistent with Jain philosophical thought.This belongs to the post Sangam period corresponding to between 100 and 500 CE. Nālaṭiyār contains 400 poems, each containing four lines. Every poem deals with morals and ethics, extolling righteous behaviour.

== Etymology ==
The term Naladiyar is derived from the Tamil terms Naalu, a colloquial form of Naangu meaning "four", adi meaning metrical feet or poetic metre, and aar referring to a honorific suffix. Thus Naladiyar refers to the work that contains four-lined verse. The work is also termed Naaladi Naanooru, sometimes spelled Naladi Nannurru, meaning "four hundred quatrains," since it has 400 verses in total.

== Didactic nature ==
Nālaṭiyār was composed by Jain monks. It is an anthology in the venba metre and is pessimistic in its outlook. It is divided into three sections, the first section focusing on the importance of virtuous life, second section on the governance and management of wealth, and the third smaller section on the pleasures.

Nālaṭiyār is unique in the employment of similes, which help to teach the moral codes using simple examples from daily life. For example, one of the poems states that just like a calf placed in front of a vast herd of cows seeks out its mother unerringly and attaches itself, the deeds of the past home in on the doer and exact their price unfailingly.

== Commentaries and translations ==
Naladiyar remains the highly praised ancient didactic text in Tamil next only to the Tirukkural. Several commentaries have appeared on the text, which includes three ancient commentaries. The three ancient commentaries were those by Padumanar, Dharumar (who has also written commentary on the Tirukkural), and an anonymous poet.

The Nalidiyar was translated into English by G. U. Pope, F. J. Leeper, and in French by Gnanou Diagou. In 2010, a prose translation was made by S. Krishnaswamy, a professor of law in Chennai.

Naladiyar was translated into Russian by N. Gordiychuk in 2016.

Naladiyar was translated into Urdu by H. K. Ghazi, I.A.S., an Indian civil servant.

In 2022, as part of its Ancient Tamil Classics in Translations series, the Central Institute of Classical Tamil (CICT) in Chennai released its Telugu translation of the Naladiyar.

== Reception ==
The Naladiyar is next only to the Tirukkural in fame among the Tamil literary works. Along with the Tirukkural, it is one of the first books published in Tamil, when it came to print from palm leaf manuscripts for the first time in 1812. There is an old Tamil proverb praising the Nālaṭiyār that says "Nālaṭiyār and the Tirukkural are very good in expressing human thoughts just as the twigs of the banyan and the neem trees are good in maintaining the teeth."

ஆலும் வேலும் பல்லுக்குறுதி; நாலும் இரண்டும் சொல்லுக்குறுதி.
(Aalum vaelum pallukkuruthi; naalum irandum sollukkuruthi)
Literal translation: "Banyan and neem maintain oral health; Four and Two maintain moral health."
(Here "Four" and "Two" refer to the quatrains and couplets of Nālaṭiyār and Tirukkuṛaḷ, respectively.)

Naladiyar is often referred to as Vellalar Vēdham (the sacred scripture of the Vellalar).

== See also ==
- Tamil Jain
- Tirukkural
