= Commentaries in Tamil literary tradition =

Work of commentaries in Tamil literature

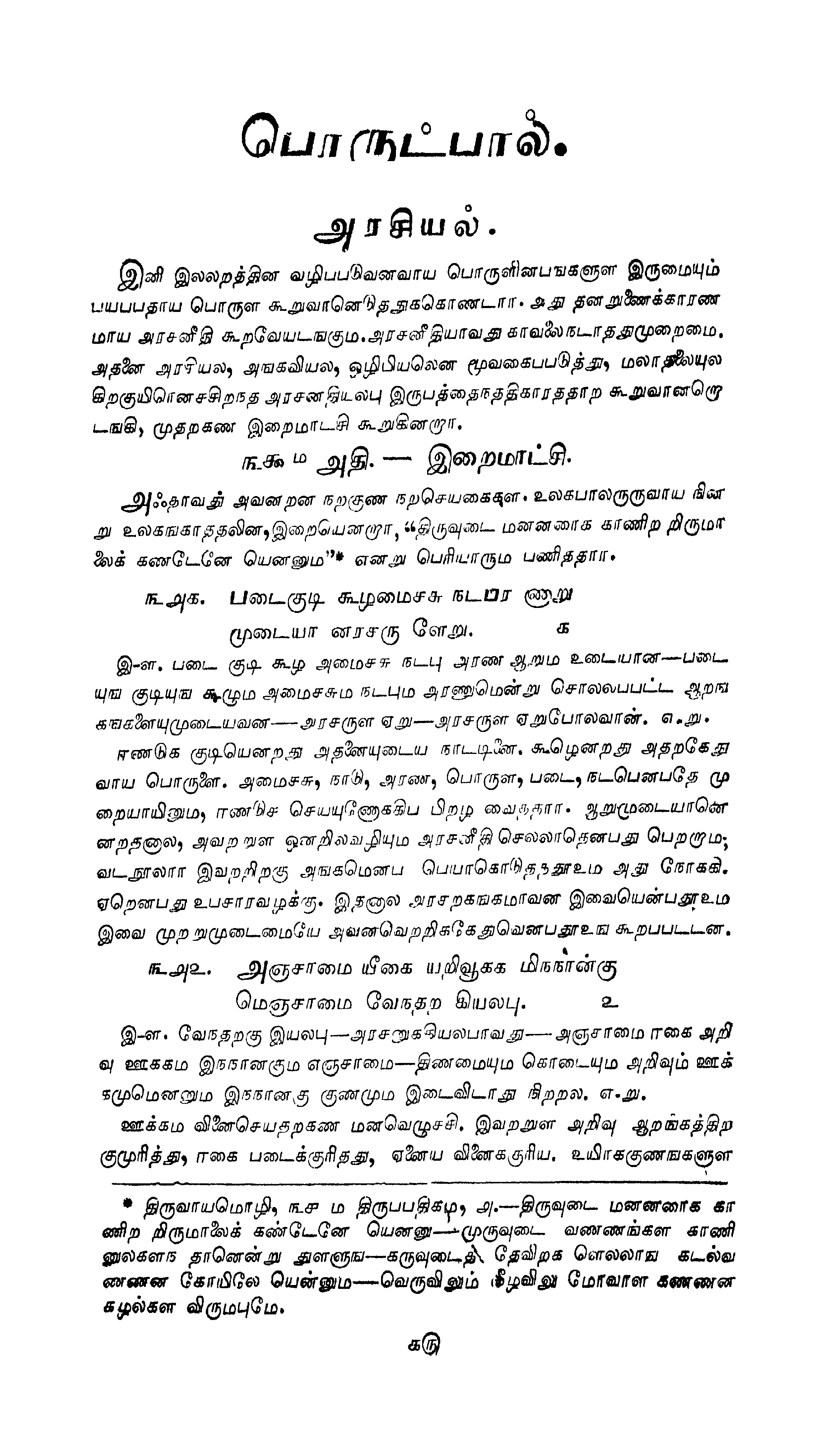
A page from the Parimelalhagar's commentary on the 39th chapter of the Tirukkural

Commentaries to literary works remain one of the most important and telling aspects of the Tamil literary tradition. Commentaries to ancient Tamil works have been written since the medieval period and continue to be written in the modern era. Many ancient Tamil works continue to remain comprehensible chiefly due to exegesis or commentaries written on them. The most famous examples of such works are the Tolkappiyam and the Tirukkural, with the latter remaining the most reviewed work in the Tamil literature.

Nakkeerar, Ilampooranar, Senavaraiyar, Paerasiriyar, Deivachilaiyar, Nacchinarkkiniyar, Parimelalhagar, Kalladar, and Adiyarkku Nallar remain the most celebrated commentators in the history of Tamil literature, all of whose works are praised on par with the original works to which they wrote exegeses.

== Background ==
Tamil is one of the most ancient and classical languages with a rich literary tradition in the world. Along with Sanskrit, it remains one of the languages of the Indian subcontinent that are richest in literature. Ancient India is known for its unique oral tradition wherein knowledge was chiefly passed on as word of mouth from parents to their children and from preceptors to their students from one generation to the next. The gradual buildup of this oral transfer of ideas through several generations resulted in an extensive corpus of knowledge, which eventually had to be written down on manuscripts. This process generated a vast scholarship in every domain of life in the Indian subcontinent, and both Sanskrit and Tamil, along with other languages, saw an exponential growth in their literature over the millennia. Commentaries to Sanskrit texts, known as Bhashya, were the first to appear around the first millennia BCE, followed by many Tamil works, which started peaking towards the end of the first millennia CE. Unlike Western tradition, where only critics abound, Indian literature is rife with commentators who both analyze the works and write exegesis on them. Tamil literary tradition is no exception to this pan-Indian phenomenon, with commentary writing having developed as a distinct domain in the scholarly world over the millennia. V. Suba Manikkanar cites the ancientness of the language as a reason for such development.

The developing, patronizing, and guarding of the Tamil literature and the language was taken care of by different members of the society in different periods. In the Sangam period, the rulers of the Tamil land took the responsibility. During Pallava's reign in the Bhakti era, the Alwars and Nayanmars were responsible in developing the language. In the later Chola period, the responsibility shifted to the literary commentators who wrote exegesis on several ancient and contemporary works. During the period of the Nayakar's regin, minor dynastic kings and aristocratic chieftains furthered the Tamil language and literature. During the colonial era under the British rule, missionaries of both Indian and foreign religions and the Tamil groups established by the opulent section of the society contributed to the growth of the language. Post-Independence, the language continues to grow by various political parties and enthusiasts among the public. The commentators of the medieval era are considered instrumental in preserving the ancient works for the posterity. This is widely acknowledged by scholars, including U. V. Swaminatha Iyer, Pandithamani M. Kathiresan Chettiyar, S. Venkatarama Chettiyar, and M. Arunachalam, among others.

== History ==
Bhashyas, which are "commentary" or "exposition" of any primary or secondary text, started appearing in Sanskrit literature in the first millennia BCE. Among the earliest known Bhashya are the Maha-bhashya of Patanjali from the 2nd century BCE, and Sabara Bhashya of the Mimamsa school of Hinduism, dated to have been likely composed between 100 BCE and 200 CE, but no later than the 5th century CE. However, commentaries to Tamil literary works, known as urai, did not exist during antiquity. According to Perasiriyar, verses 653 and 656 of the "Porul" section of the Tolkappiyam assert this fact. Commentaries to work was literally non-existent during the Sangam era. The development of commentaries is thought to have begun around the medieval times during the time of the later Cholas (11th to 14th centuries CE) and developed over the centuries. The exegesis to the work Iraiyanar Kalaviyal is considered the first commentary in the Tamil literary tradition. According to A. M. Paramasivanandhan, it is the first prosaic commentary to a composition in verse. Iraiyanar Kalaviyal was passed on orally to nine generations from Nakkiranar till Nilakandanar. It was written down in manuscripts only in the 8th century CE. This marked the beginning of commentaries in Tamil literary tradition, which reached it peak between the 10th and 15th centuries.

Commentaries had a humble beginning in the history of Tamil literature. The earliest commentaries were more of glossaries listing the meanings of difficult terms appearing in poetries. As time went by, few historical accounts pertaining to the verse on hand were appended to these glossary lists. Such commentaries were termed arumpadha urai (literally, glossary commentary). The first commentary to the Silappathigaram was of such kind. Over time, with the addition of few intermittent, brief notes to the glossary explanations, these "glossary" commentaries morphed into what came to be known as kurippurai (literally, notes commentary). The earliest commentaries to the Sangam works of Pathittrupatthu, Agananuru, Purananuru, Ainkurunuru, and Paripaadal are examples of notes commentaries. As with most of the ancient Tamil works, not much is known about the authors of these commentaries. With centuries of scholarships over the works, these commentaries expanded to become vilakka urai (literally, explanatory commentary), which contained several examples and elaborations in their briefings. For instance, the earliest commentary to Nammalwar's Tiruvaimoli was 6,000 lines in length, which later expanded to 9,000, then to 24,000, and finally to 36,000 lines.

The vilakka urai commentaries are considered the best of all the commentaries and have stood the test of time, chiefly owing to their emulating the best of their arumpadha urai and kurippurai predecessors. Mohan and Sokkalingam call this literary phenomenon the "survival of the fittest". Thus the later commentaries to the Tolkappiyam such as those by Senavaraiyar, Paerasiriyar, Nacchinarkkiniyar, and Deivacchilaiyar are preferred to the earliest commentary by Ilampooranar. The 36,000-lined Eedu commentary to Tiruvaimoli fared the best among other earlier commentaries to the work. The earliest known commentary to the Kural text was written around the 10th century CE by Manakkudavar. Parimelalhagar's commentary, which appeared during the 13th century, is considered the best among the ten medieval commentaries to the Kural text. Sivagnana Munivar's Nannul Virutthi Urai took precedence over older commentaries to Nannul such as those by Mayilai Nathar and Shankara Namacchivayar. Despite several earlier commentaries to Sivagnana Bodham, the Sivagnana Padiyam which appeared much later is considered the best.

When the first commentaries began to appear in the Tamil literary world, they appeared more in the prevalent spoken dialect. More often than not, they resembled the conversations between a preceptor and a disciple. This is because the commentators who wrote the earliest commentaries were scholars who taught students on those subjects. Examples of such commentaries include the early commentaries to Iraiyanar Agapporul, Senavaraiyar's commentary to Part II of the Tolkappiyam, Perasiriyar's commentary to Tirukkovaiyar, Kaalingar's commentary to the Tirukkural. Commentaries to the works of the Alvars chiefly appeared in a mixture of Tamil and Sanskrit, known as Manipravalam.

The Bhakti literature, which proliferated during the Bhakti era that began around the eighth century CE, remained without any exegeses for centuries. This was chiefly because of the widespread notion that spiritual texts should be interpreted only through personal experience and not by the elaborations given by others. Nevertheless, during the time of Ramanuja in the 10th century, scholars attempted to write commentaries to the Vaishnavite works of the Alvars. Initially met with rejection, they slowly gained acceptance with the public discourses given by religious scholars. These discourses were written down by scholars among the audience and grew to become exegeses on their own. Exegeses to Shaivite works, nevertheless, did not appear until the 19th century. It was only in the 20th century that scholars felt the need for literary commentaries to the Shivite literature.

In the words of Mohan and Sokkalingam, the commentators are considered responsible for initiation the process of "return to classicism." According to S. Vaiyapuri Pillai, they are also responsible for the revival of interest among the general public in the study of olden literature and linguistics, especially when the original dialect of the language was no more in general usage. Chief among them were Ilampooranar, Senavaraiyar, Paerasiriyar, Nacchinarkkiniyar, Parimelalhagar, and Adiyarkku Nallar, who lived between the 11th and the 14th centuries CE. Scholars consider this period as "the golden age of Tamil prosaic literature".

In the Tamil literary tradition, it is conventional to regard the commentators on par with the author of the original work. In line with the Tamil traditional practice of naming a work eponymous with the author, the exegeses written by the commentators, too, were named after the commentators. Thus the exegetical works of Ilampooranar, Senavaraiyar, Paerasiriyar, and Nacchinarkkiniyar came to be known, respectively, as Ilampooranam, Senavaraiyam, Paerasiriyam, and Nacchinarkkiniyam. Their works were hugely popular among the common public that people even went on to name their children after these commentators.

According to V. Suba Manikkam, efforts in literary development appeared in three forms, viz. exegeses to ancient works, supportive grammar works, and short literatures. Examples of the first form, exegeses to ancient works, include the ten Medieval commentaries of the Tirukkural and the commentaries to the Tolkappiyam. Supportive grammar works included Iraiyanar Agapporul, Nambi Agapporul, Purapporul Venbamaalai, Nannool, Yapparunkalam, Yapparunkala Kaarigai, Dhandiyalankaram, and so forth. Short literatures include Pillai Tamil, Thoodhu, Ula, Barani, Anthadhi, Kovai, Kalambagam, Kuravanji, Pallhu, Madal, Maalai, Sadhakam, Venba, Thogai, and so forth.

Literary criticism in Tamil tradition is said to have flourished between the 11th and 14th centuries CE.

== Types of commentaries ==
=== Commentaries in verse ===
In Indian literary tradition, exegeses are also written in verse form to the original work in verse, which remained a widespread practice since the ancient times. While this is more common with Sanskrit works, the Tamil literary tradition, too, has had this practice since the middle ages. The exemplifying venbas of the Sivagyana Bodham and Siddhiyar remain in verse forms. In his Periyapuranam, Sekkilar's exegesis to the Thevaram appears in verse. There was an exegesis in verse to the Sangam work of the Akananuru. Many earliest commentaries of the Tirukkural appear in verse. Even after the arrival of prosaic commentaries to the Kural text, such as the ten medieval commentaries, as many as 21 verse commentaries to the Kural text were written in the medieval times, such as the Murugesar Muduneri Venba, Jinendra Venba, Irangesa Venba, Sivasiva Venba, Dhinakara Venba, Vadamalai Venba, and Somesar Mudumoli Venba. Kumarakurubarar's Needhineri Vilakkam explains several Kural couplets in verse. In his work Kalladam, Kalladar has written verse exegesis in akaval metre to 100 verses of the Tirukkovaiyar. Aandippulavar's 15th-century exegesis to the Nannul and Gurugyanasambandar's Gyanavarana Vilakkam, which is an exegesis to the Sivagyana Siddar's philosophy, are all examples of commentaries in verse form.

The practice of writing exegeses in verse form continued well into the 20th century. Examples include verse commentaries to the Kural literature such as Tirukkural Akaval, Kutti Kural, and Tirukkural Isai Maalai, Bharathidasan's elaborations of some of the Kurunthogai verses, and Kannadasan's elaborations of some of the Mutthollayiram verses.

=== Self-written commentaries ===
Self-written commentaries are commentaries that are written by the author himself/herself. According to the 17th-century work Prayoga Vivegam, the practice of writing self-written commentaries in the Indian Subcontinent began in Sanskrit literature. The first self-written commentary in the Tamil literature was the one written by Iyyanaridhanar for his work Purapporul Venbamaalai. This was followed by several others, including the following:

- The exegesis of the 12th-century author for his work Thandiyalankaaram
- Meikkanda Thevar's exegesis to the 12 axioms of his work Sivagyana Bodham
- The late-13th-century author Naarkavirajanambi's exegesis to his grammar work Akapporul Vilakkam
- The 17th-century author Subramaniya Dikshitar's exegesis to his grammar work Prayoga Vivegam
- Vaidhyanatha Desikar's exegesis to his grammar work Ilakkana Vilakkam
- Swaminatha Desikar's exegesis to his grammar work Ilakkana Kotthu
- Constanzo Beschi's exegesis to his work Thonnul Vilakkam

This trend, too, continued well into the 20th century, with authors such as R. Raghava Iyengar, Jagavira Pandiyanar, and Bharathidasan writing their own exegesis to their respective works of Paari Kaadhai, Kumaresa Venba, and Pudhiya Aatthicchudi.

=== Dialogic commentaries ===
The process of writing prosaic commentaries to the itihasas, puranas, and other Indian epics, which were originally written in verse, began in the early 19th century. Exegeses to epics such as the Ramayana, the Mahabaratha, Periya Puranam, and Kanda Puranam, began to appear in Tamil, and these came to be known as vasanam or dialogic commentaries. Soon, dialogic commentaries to the Sangam works, such as the Eight Anthologies and Ten Idylls series of texts, began to appear.

=== Compiled commentaries ===
Twentieth century witnessed the practice of comparative study and compilation of exegeses from different periods. The prime example of this type of anthological exegeses is that of the Tirukkural. Commentaries to the Kural text are available at least from the 10th century CE, and scholars have been continuously analyzing various Kural commentaries ever since. These have resulted in the publication of various commentary compilations to the Kural text in the 20th century, such as Tirukkural Urai Kotthu (Compendium of Kural exegeses), Tirukkural Urai Valam (Kural exegeses omnibus), and Tirukkural Urai Vettrumai (Differences in Kural exegeses). Old exegeses to the Naladiyar were compiled and published in two volumes entitled Naladiyar Urai Valam by the Saraswati Mahal Library. Similar compiled commentaries have appeared for other works such as the Tirumurugattrupadai and the Tolkappiyam. Compiled commentaries to the Tolkappiyam have appeared exclusively for each of the three parts of the work.

=== Simplified commentaries ===
Simplified commentaries are commentaries written on age-old commentaries, which are complex by virtue of their ancientness, in order to make them comprehensive to the contemporary public. The process of writing simplified commentaries began in 1949 with M. Varadharajan's exegesis on the Tirukkural titled Tirukkural Thelivurai, whose 175th edition was published in 2003. Several similar commentaries started appearing on other ancient works such as the Tolkappiyam and the Athichudi.

== See also ==
- Ten medieval commentators
- Tamil language
- Tamil literature
