= Legendary Tamil Sangams =

Assemblies of Tamil scholars

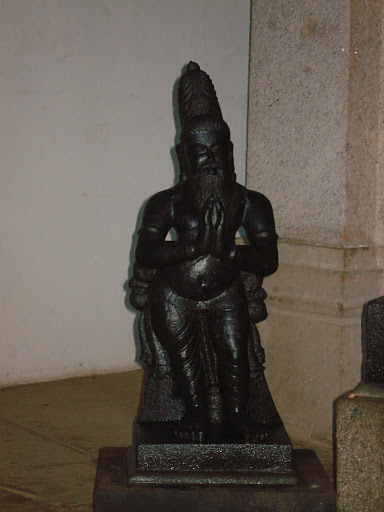
Agathiyar (Agastya), Chairman of first Tamil Sangam, at Madurai in the Pandiya kingdom. Statue of Agastya in the Tamil Thai (Mother Tamil) temple in Karaikudi, Tamil Nadu, India

The Tamil Sangams (Tamil: சங்கம் caṅkam, Old Tamil 𑀘𑀗𑁆𑀓𑀫𑁆) were three legendary gatherings of Tamil scholars and poets that, according to traditional Tamil accounts, occurred in the remote past. Scholars believe that these assemblies were originally known as kooṭam or "gathering," which was also a name for Madurai. Three assemblies are described. The legend has it that the first two were held in cities since "taken by the sea", the first being called Kapatapuram, and the third was held in the present-day city of Madurai.

Topics in Tamil literature
Sangam Literature
Five Great Epics
Silappatikaram	Manimekalai
Civaka Cintamani	Valayapathi
Kundalakesi
Five Minor Epics
Neelakesi	Culamani
Naga Kumara Kaviyam	Udayana Kumara Kaviyam
Yashodhara Kaviyam
Bhakti Literature
Naalayira Divya Prabandham	Kamba Ramayanam
Tevaram	Tirumurai
Tamil people
Sangam	Sangam landscape
Tamil history from Sangam literature	Ancient Tamil music
Religion in ancient Tamilakam

== Historical Sangam period and Sangam literature ==
The historical Sangam period, alluding to the Sangam-legends, extended from roughly 300–200 BCE to 300 CE (early Chola period before the interregnum). In this period the earliest extant works of Tamil literature were written (also known as Sangam literature), dealing with love, war, governance, trade and bereavement. The name Sangam and the associated legends probably derive from a much later period. "Sangam" is also known as koodal (Tamil: கூடல்) or "gathering".

An accurate chronological assessment of literary works has been rendered difficult due to lack of concrete scientific evidence to support conflicting claims.Undue reliance on the Sangam legends has thus culminated in controversial opinions or interpretations among scholars, confusion in the dates, names of authors, and doubts of even their existence in some cases. The earliest archaeological evidence connecting Madurai and the Sangams is the 10th century Cinnamanur inscription of the Pandyas.

== Three legendary Sangams ==
According to Tamil legends, there were three Sangams.

Sangam	Time span	No. of Poets	no of king	Kingdom	Books
First	4440 years	549	89		
Second	3700 years	1700	59		Tolkāppiyam (author - Tolkāppiyar)(legendary; extend version dated to 5th c. CE)
Third	1850 years		49	Pandiya	covers entire corpus of Sangam Literature

Nilakanta Sastri observes that a sangam of Tamil poets flourished for a time in Madurai may well be a fact. But the facts regarding sangam have got mixed up with much fiction, making it difficult to draw reliable conclusions from them. Kamil Zvelebil, finds a kernel of truth in them, suggesting that they may be based on one or more actual historical assemblies. Others reject the entire notion as not factual. Nevertheless, legends of the Sangams played a significant role in inspiring political, social, and literary movements in Tamil Nadu in the early 20th century.

Early literature from the pre-Pallava dynasty period does not contain any mention of the Sangam academies, although some early poems imply a connection between the city of Madurai, which later legends associate with the third Sangam, and Tamil literature and the cultivation of the language. The earliest express references to the academies are found in the songs of Appar and Sampandar, Shaivite poets who lived in the 7th century. The first full account of the legend is found in a commentary to the Iraiyanar Akapporul by Nakkīrar (c. 7th/8th century CE). Nakkīrar describes three "Sangams" (caṅkam) spanning thousands of years.

There are a number of other isolated references to the legend of academies at Madurai scattered through Shaivite and Vaishnavite devotional literature throughout later literature. The next substantive references to the legend of the academies, however, appear in two significantly later works, namely, the Thiruvilaiyadal Puranam of Perumpaṟṟapuliyūr Nambi, and the better-known work of the same title by Paranjothi Munivar. These works describe a legend that deals mostly with the third Sangam at Madurai, and is so substantially different from that set out in Nakkirar's commentary that some authors such as Zvelebil speculate that it may be based on a different, and somewhat independent, tradition.

In contemporary versions of the legend, the cities where the first two Sangams were held are said to have been located on Kumari Kandam, a fabled lost continent, that lay to the South of mainland India, and which was described as the cradle of Tamil culture.

Kumari Kandam supposedly lay south of present-day Kanyakumari District and, according to these legends, was seized by the sea in a series of catastrophic floods.

== First legendary Sangam ==
The First Sangam (Tamil: முதற்சங்க பருவம், Muthaṟchanga paruvam) is also known as the First Academy, and as the Head Sangam (Tamil: தலைச்சங்க பருவம், Thalaichanga paruvam).

The first Sangam (mutaṟcaṅkam) is described as having been held at "the Madurai which was submerged by the sea", or known among historians as Kapatapuram, lasted a total of 4,400 years, and had 549 members, which supposedly included some gods of the Hindu pantheon such as Siva, Kubera, Murugan and Agastya. A city was found submerged in Pondicherry and according to the location, has been popularly credited as being the site for the first Sangam, Kapatapuram. A total of 4,449 poets are described as having composed songs for this Sangam. There were 89 Pandiya kings starting from Kaysina valudi to Kadungon were decedents and rulers of that period.

It was said to be located in Then Madurai under the patronage of 89 Pandya kings. It is said to have lasted for 4,440 years, and this would put the First Sangam between 9600 BCE to 5200 BCE.

Some are of the opinion that Agathiyar was the head of the Head Sangam. However, this is unlikely as the first mention of him is from Ptolemy and no Sangam work refers to him. A more likely proposition is Lord Muruga (Kartikeya) being the head of the First Sangam as believed by others.

Its function was to judge literary works and credit their worth. Later literary works like Iraiyanar Akaporul mention that 549 poets were members of it including Shiva, Murugan, Kuperan and seven Pandya kings. And 16,149 authors attended the convocation. Its chief works were Perumparipadal, Mudukuruku, Mudunarai and Kalariyavirai. It used Agattiyam as its grammar. There are no surviving works from this period.

Muranjiyur Mudinagar, a member of the first Tamil Sangam, is believed to have been a king of the Nagas in Jaffna. Siddha medicine is said to have been practiced during the First Sangam, and people "enjoyed mental and bodily health, respecting nature and living hygienically."

Iraiyanar Kalaviyal mentions that a King Kadungon was the last ruler during the Talaiccankam. He is not to be confused with Kadungon who defeated the Kalabhras. It was washed away in a sea-deluge. This led to the Middle Sangam.

== Second legendary sangam ==
The Second Sangam (iṭaicaṅkam) is also known as the Middle Sangam (Tamil: இடை சங்கம்) and the Second Academy. It was convened in Kapatapuram. This Sangam lasted for 3700 years and had 59 members, with 3700 poets participating. There were 59 Pandiya kings starting from Vendercceliyan to Mudattirumaran were decedents and rulers of that period. This city was also submerged in sea.

The primary factors leading to the formation of the Middle Sangam was mentioned by Iraiyanar, one of the authors of Kurunthogai, who mentions the kingdom of a King named Kandungon, the last ruler during the First Sangam. It was washed away in a sea-erosion. This led to the Second Sangam.

The second Sangam was convened in Kapatapuram. This Sangam lasted for 3700 years and had 59 members, with 1700 poets participating. There were 59 Pandiya kings starting from Vendercceliyan to Mudattirumaran were decedents and rulers of that period. This city was also submerged in sea. Ramayana and Arthashastra of Kautalya corroborates the existence of a city named Kavatapuram. There is a reference to a South Indian place called Kavata by Sugriva in a verse which runs something like 'having reached Kavata suitable for Pandiya'. Kavata is also mentioned by Kautalya in Arthashastra. The grammar followed was Budapuranam, Agattiyam, Tholkappiyam, Mapuranam and Isai Nunukkam. The poems attributed to second academy are Kali, Kurugu, Vendali and Viyalamalai Ahaval.

== Third legendary Sangam ==
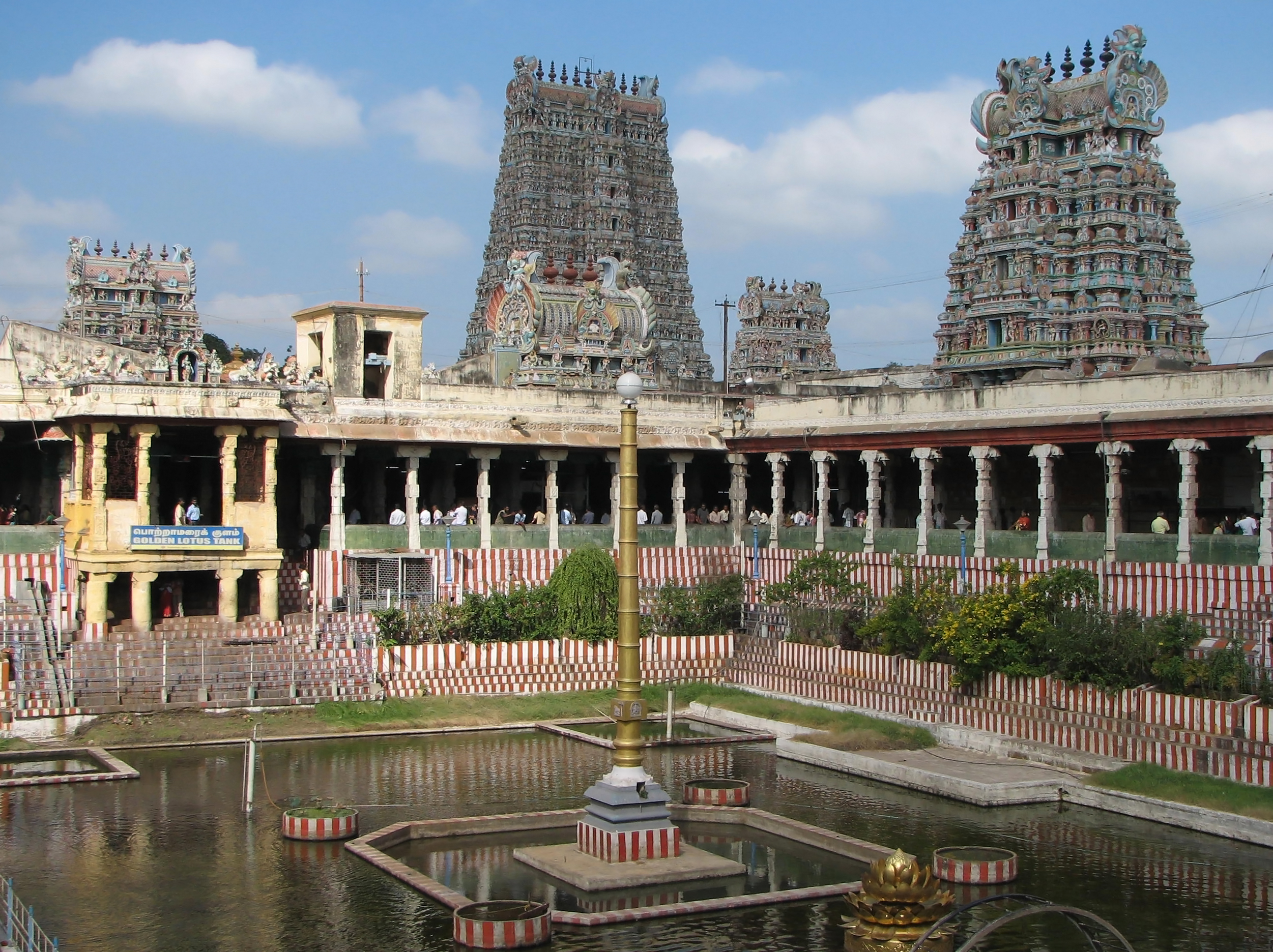
Late legends say that the third Sangam was held on the banks of the sacred Pond of Golden Lotuses in Madurai.

The third Sangam (kaṭaicaṅkam) was purportedly located in the current city of Madurai and lasted for 1850 years. There were 49 Pandiya kings starting from Mudattirumaran (who came away from Kabadapuram to present Madurai) to Ukkirapperu Valudi were decedents and rulers of that period. The academy had 49 members, and 449 poets are described as having participated in the Sangam. The grammars followed were Agattiyam and Tholkappiyam. The poems composed were Kurunthogai, Netunthogai, Kurunthogai Nanooru, Narrinai Nanooru, Purananooru, Aingurunooru, Padirrupaatu, Kali, Paripaadal, Kuttu, Vari, Sirrisai and Perisai.

There are a number of other isolated references to the legend of academies at Madurai scattered through Shaivite and Vaishnavite devotional literature throughout later literature.

In Nambi's account, the 49 members of the third Sangam led by Kapilar, Paraṇar and Nakkīrar were great devotees of Shiva, numbered amongst the 63 nayanars. Nakkirar himself is said to have later headed the Sangam, and to have debated Shiva. The Sangam is described as having been held on the banks of the Pond of Golden Lotuses in the Meenakshi-Sundaresvarar Temple in Madurai.

== Historicity ==
P. T. Srinivasa Iyengar, in his book "History of Tamils" (in Chapter XVI on topic "Criticism of the legend", writes that—

- The First Sangam lasted 4440 years and spanned 89 succeeding kings.
- The Second Sangam lasted 3700 years and spanned 59 succeeding kings.
- The Third Sangam lasted 1800 years and spanned 49 succeeding kings.

According to Kamil Zvelebil, the assemblies may have been founded and patronised by the Pandian kings and functioning in three different capitals consecutively till the last sangam was set up in Madurai. Zvelebil argues that the appearance of the tradition in literary and epigraphical sources means that it cannot be dismissed as pure fiction. He suggests that the Sangam legends are based on a historical "body of scholiasts and grammarians [that] 'sits' as a norm-giving, critical college of literary experts, and shifts its seat according to the geopolitical conditions of the Pandiyan kingdom."

In 470 CE, a Dravida Sangha was established in Madurai by a Jain named Vajranandi. During that time the Tamil region was ruled by the Kalabhras dynasty. The Kalabhra rulers were followers of either Buddhism or Jainism. The Dravida Sangha took much interest in the Tamil language and literature. George L. Hart suggests that later legends about Tamil Sangams may have been based on the Jaina assembly.

== See also ==
- Madurai Tamil Sangam
- List of Sangam poets

== Sources ==
- Basham, A. L. (1981), The Wonder That Was India (3rd ed.), Calcutta: Rupa
- Chopra, P.N.; Ravindran, T.K.; Subrahmanian, N. (2003), History Of South India – Ancient Medieval & Modern, New Delhi: Sultan Chand & Company, ISBN 81-219-0153-7
- Daniélou, Alain (11 February 2003). A Brief History of India. Simon and Schuster. ISBN 9781594777943.
- Krishnamurti, C.R (1998), Thamizh Literature Through the Ages: A socio-cultural perspective, Pondicherry: Radhika Publishers
- Nilakanta Sastri, K. A. (1975), A History of South India: From Prehistoric Times to the Fall of Vijayanagar (4th ed.), New Delhi: Oxford University Press
- Marr, John Ralston (1985), The Eight Anthologies, Madras: Institute of Asian Studies
- Meenakshisundaran, T.P. (1965), History of Tamil Literature, Publications in linguistics – Annamalai University, Chidambaram: Annamalai University
- Nagaswamy, R. (2004), "Sangam Poetic traditions under the Imperial Cholas", in Chevillard, Jean-Luc; Wilden, Eva (eds.), South-Indian Horizons: Felicitation Volume for François Gros on the occasion of his 70th birthday, Publications du Département d'Indologie – 94, Pondicherry: Institut Français de Pondichéry / École Française d'Extrême-Orient, pp. 487–494, ISBN 2-85539-630-1, ISSN 0073-8352
- Narasimhaiah, B. (1980), Neolithic and Megalithic Cultures in Tamil Nadu, Delhi: Sundeep Prakashan, ISBN 81-7574-048-5
- Ramaswamy, Sumathi (1999), "Catastrophic Cartographies: Mapping the Lost Continent of Lemuria", Representations, 67 (67): 92–129, doi:10.1525/rep.1999.67.1.01p0048w (inactive 12 July 2025)
- Ramaswamy, Sumathi (2004), The Lost Land of Lemuria: Fabulous Geographies, Catastrophic Histories, Berkeley: University of California Press, ISBN 0-520-24440-0
- Zvelebil, Kamil (1973a), "The Earliest Account of the Tamil Academies", Indo-Iranian Journal, 15 (2): 109–135, doi:10.1007/BF00157289 (inactive 12 July 2025), S2CID 189777598
- Zvelebil, Kamil (1973b), The Smile of Murugan: On Tamil Literature of South India, Leiden: Brill, ISBN 90-04-03591-5
- Zvelebil, Kamil (1974), Tamil Literature, A History of Indian Literature, Vol. X Fasc. 1, Wiesbaden: Otto Harrassowitz, ISBN 3-447-01582-9
- Srinivasa-iyengar, P.T. (1929), History of the Tamils: from the earliest times to 600 A.D., New Delhi: Asian Educational Service, ISBN 81-206-0145-9
