= Government Arts College, Salem =

Art school in Salem, Tamil Nadu

Coordinates: 11.663554°N 78.158320°E

Government Arts College, Salem-7
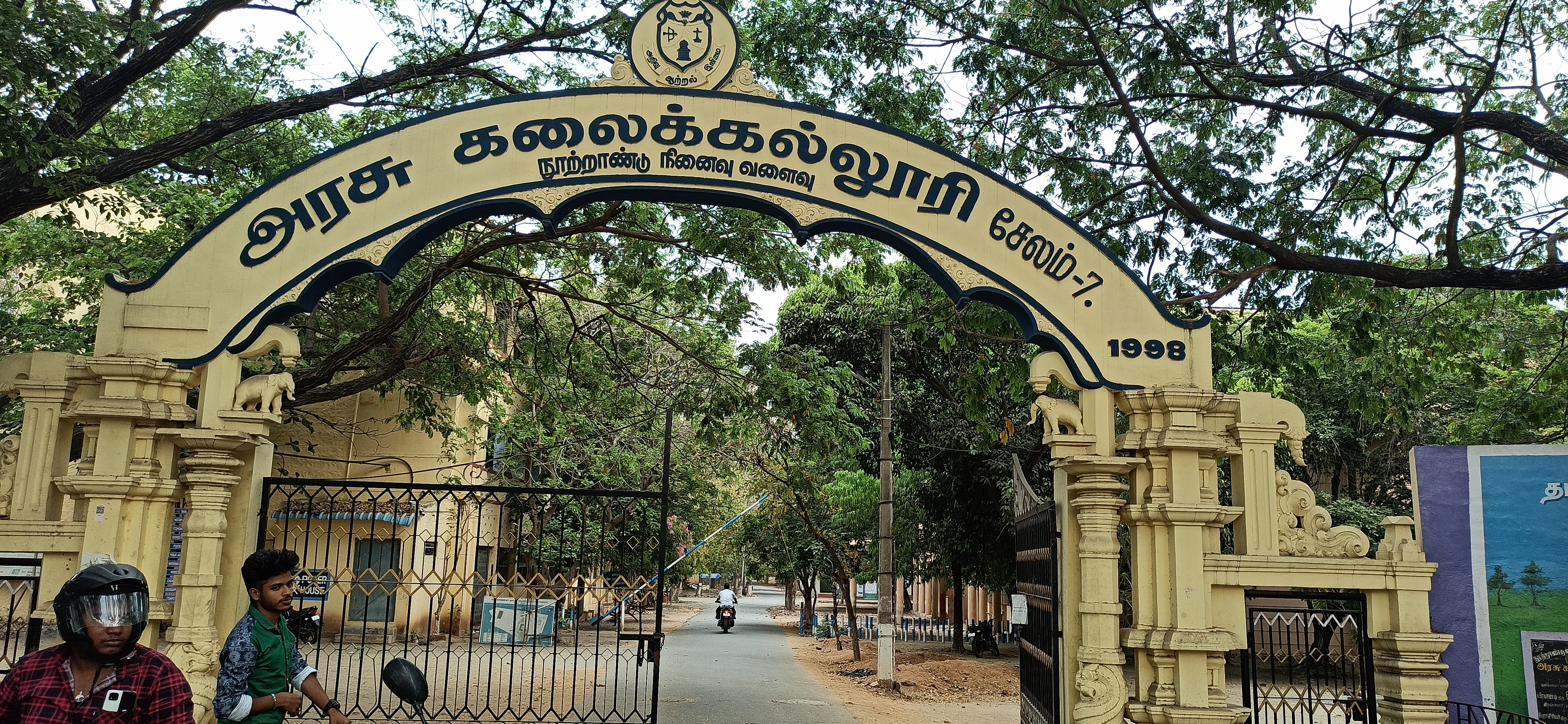
- Government Arts College Gate, Salem
- Motto in English: Knowledge, Power, Sweetness
- Type: Public
- Established: 1857
- Affiliations: Periyar University
- Principal: N. Shenbagalakshmi
- Academic staff: 234
- Students: 5,580
- Location: Salem, Tamil Nadu, India
- Campus: Urban
- Language: Tamil, English
- Website: http://gacsalem7.co.in/

Government Arts College, Salem, is an autonomous college in Salem, Tamil Nadu, India.

== History ==
=== Anglo-Vernacular School (1857-79) ===
The college was originally established as an Anglo-Vernacular School in 1857 by Alexander John Arbuthnot and converted into District School (Zillah High School) with 195 students. The school functioned in a rented building till 1863, then it moved to its own building, constructed in collaboration with public subscription and Government grant. In 1864 the school sent its first batch of students to the Matriculation Examination conducted by the University of Madras.

=== Affiliate College (1879-85) ===
In March 1879, the school was upgraded to a second grade college affiliated to the University of Madras. Seven students from the college attended First Arts Examination held in 1880-81.

=== Salem Municipal College (1885-1960) ===
In October 1885, the college was undertaken by Salem Municipal Council and was named as Salem Municipal College.

In 1928, the college was shifted to the present location after purchasing 11 acres of land near Maravaneri.

On 29 June 1931, P. T. Rajan, then Minister for Development, Public Works and Registration in the B. Munuswamy Naidu ministry of the erstwhile Madras Presidency, laid the foundation stone for the clock tower block (near the north end of the campus). The block was built at the cost of ₹.1,50,000, and was opened on 24 November 1932 by Radhabai Subbarayan, the Zamindarini of Kumaramangalam.

In 1944, the college was upgraded to a first grade college.

During his tenure as Salem Municipal Chairman (1941–47), P. Rathinaswami Pillai constructed a second building in the campus with subscriptions and donations received from the public and other institutions.. Consequently, the student strength increased from 408 to 1008.

Students of the 1950-51 batch established a bust in memory of A.Ramasamy, the sixth principal of the college (during 1923-50). It was unveiled on 16 September 1951 by S.G. Manavala Ramanujam, then Vice Chancellor of Annamalai University.

=== Government Arts College (1960-present) ===
The Government of Madras (now Tamil Nadu) took over the college from 1 April 1960 onwards.

In 1976, a two-storey building was built in the campus at the cost of ₹.9,11,000 for the departments of Geography Physics and Zoology.

From 1983, non-semester system was followed.

From 1998-99, the college became a co-educational institution.

The present semester pattern was introduced from 1999-2000.

In 2000, the college received a three-star rating from the National Assessment and Accreditation Council (NAAC).

In 2006, the NAAC re-evaluated the college and rated it 'B ++'.

The college gained autonomous status in 2007. Since then, the old method of examination was replaced by an alternative system with internal marks in semester system.

In accordance with the order of the State government, shift system was introduced in the year 2007-08 and the second shift classes started functioning in departments like Maths, Computer Science, Tamil, English, Commerce, History and Co-Operation.

In 2018, the NAAC re-accredited the college with 'B' status.

In 2019, the University Grants Commission (UGC) extended the college's autonomous status till 2023-24.

== List of Principals ==
=== Key ===
- ^{d} Died in Office

| No. | Name | Term of office | |
| No. | Name | From | To |
|---|---|---|---|
| 1 | Boert | Unknown | 1904 |
| 2 | Spencer | 1904 | 1914 |
| 3 | Seshathiri | 1914 | 1918 |
| 4 | S.K. Yagna Narayanan | 1918 | 1922 |
| 5 | S.K. Narayanan | 1922 | 1927 |
| 6 | A. Ramasamy | 1927 | 19 August 1950^{[d]} |
| 7 | | 20 August 1950 | 1955 |
| 8 | V.Achuthan Nair | 1955 | 1964 |
| 9 | K.S. Venkateswaran | 1964 | 1965 |
| 10 | Mir Saheer Hussain | 1966 | 1967 |
| 11 | Ramanan Unni | 1967 | 1969 |
| 12 | K. Meenakshi Sundaram | 1969 | 1971 |
| 13 | V. Kannaiyah | 1972 | 1973 |
| 14 | P.T. Muniappa | 1973 | 1977 |
| 15 | M.K. Thangavelu | 1977 | 1978 |
| 16 | R. Ayyasamy | 1978 | 16 July 1979 |
| 17 | K. Perumal | 16 July 1979 | 31 May 1980 |
| 18 | R. Narasingam | 31 May 1980 | 12 October 1981 |
| 19 | A. Nagarajan | 12 October 1981 | 28 January 1982 |
| 20 | ? | 28 January 1982 | 5 November 1982 |
| 21 | N. Kailasam | 5 November 1982 | 30 April 1984 |
| 22 | ? | 30 April 1984 | 31 May 1984 |
| 23 | M.S. Srinivasan | 1 June 1984 | 16 June 1984 |
| 24 | ? | 16 June 1984 | 9 July 1984 |
| 25 | S.M. Kamal Basha | 9 July 1984 | 31 May 1987 |
| 26 | ? | 1 June 1987 | 10 June 1987 |
| 27 | G.S. Narasiman | 11 June 1987 | 8 June 1988 |
| 28 | ? | 8 June 1988 | 13 June 1988 |
| 29 | K. Jayaraman | 14 June 1988 | 20 June 1989 |
| 30 | M. Ganapathy | 21 June 1989 | 10 November 1992 |
| 31 | ? | 11 November 1992 | 15 December 1992 |
| 32 | T.C. Shanmugasundaram | 16 December 1992 | 5 July 1993 |
| 33 | ? | 6 July 1993 | 15 July 1993 |
| 34 | Thanga Rayer | 16 July 1993 | 30 November 1994 |
| 35 | ? | 1 December 1994 | 30 December 1994 |
| 36 | V. Santhanam | 31 December 1994 | 2 August 1995 |
| 37 | A. Kumararaj | 3 August 1995 | 31 May 1996 |
| 38 | ? | 1 June 1996 | 4 July 1996 |
| 39 | S. Natarajan | 5 July 1996 | 31 May 1997 |
| 40 | N.M. Viswanathan | 31 May 1997 | 31 May 1998 |
| 41 | ? | 1 June 1998 | 7 June 1998 |
| 42 | P. Thangavel | 8 June 1998 | 8 July 1999 |
| 43 | P. Thanigasalam | 9 July 1999 | 31 August 2000 |
| 44 | P. Thiyagarajan | 1 September 2000 | 3 February 2001 |
| 45 | P. Syamalabai | 4 February 2001 | 20 June 2001 |
| 46 | M. Balakrishnan | 21 June 2001 | 26 January 2003 |
| 47 | ? | 27 January 2003 | 1 May 2003 |
| 48 | D. Pathmini | 2 May 2003 | 3 May 2003 |
| 49 | ? | 4 May 2003 | 27 July 2003 |
| 50 | L. Lakshmanan | 28 July 2003 | 3 September 2004 |
| 51 | ? | 4 September 2004 | 14 December 2004 |
| 52 | A. Jayalakshmi | 15 December 2004 | 5 July 2005 |
| 53 | C. Murugesan | 6 July 2005 | 31 May 2006 |
| 54 | ? | 1 June 2006 | 13 June 2006 |
| 55 | M.N. Chandrasekaran | 14 June 2006 | 31 May 2007 |
| 56 | ? | 1 June 1007 | 6 June 200i7 |
| 57 | R. Periyasamy | 7 June 2007 | 31 May 2008 |
| 58 | ? | 1 June 2008 | 12 June 2008 |
| 59 | K. Mohammed Rashak | 13 June 2008 | 31 May 2009 |
| 60 | ? | 1 June 2009 | 14 June 2009 |
| 61 | S. Seetharaman | 15 June 2009 | 31 May 2011 |
| 62 | P. Thirumoorthy | 1 June 2011 | 3 June 2011 |
| 63 | ? | 4 June 2011 | 6 June 2011 |
| 64 | P. Ganesan | 7 June 2011 | 17 June 2011 |
| 65 | ? | 18 June 2011 | 22 June 2011 |
| 66 | S.V. Govindaraju | 23 June 2011 | 25 July 2011 |
| 67 | R. Rangarajan | 26 July 2011 | 1 August 2011 |
| (66) | S.V. Govindaraju | 2 August 2011 | 23 December 2011 |
| 68 | ? | 24 December 2011 | 25 December 2011 |
| (67) | R. Rangarajan | 26 December 2011 | 30 December 2011 |
| 69 | ? | 30 December 2011 | 31 December 2011 |
| (66) | S.V. Govindaraju | 1 January 2012 | 17 February 2012 |
| 70 | ? | 18 February 2012 | 19 February 2012 |
| 71 | K.R. Ravindran | 20 February 2012 | 29 February 2012 |
| 72 | ? | 1 March 2012 | 22 August 2012 |
| 73 | A.R. Rasamani | 23 August 2012 | 31 May 2014 |
| 74 | S.C. Suriyanarayanan | 1 June 2014 | 1 July 2014 |
| 75 | R. Dhanalakshmi | 2 July 2014 | 31 May 2016 |
| 76 | K. Murugeswari | 1 June 2016 | 12 October 2016 |
| 77 | T. Subramani | 13 October 2016 | 27 October 2016 |
| 78 | P. Esther Joice | 28 October 2016 | 1 August 2017 |
| 79 | G. Venkatesan | 2 August 2017 | 28 August 2017 |
| 80 | M. Sakunthala | 28 August 2017 | 30 June 2018 |
| 81 | ? | 1 July 2018 | 3 July 2018 |
| 82 | S. Kalaichelvan | 4 July 2018 | 8 June 2023 |
| 83 | N. Shenbagalakshmi | 9 June 2023 | Incumbent |

== Academic programmes ==
The college offers undergraduates and postgraduate programmes in arts and science streams. It has been accredited by NAAC and operates autonomously under the Periyar University.

=== Departments ===
| Subject | Undergraduate | Postgraduate | Research |
|---|---|---|---|
Arts and Commerce
| Tamil | check | check | check |
| English | check | check | check |
| History | check | check | check |
| Political Science | (shift 1) | check | |
| Human Rights | | check | |
| Public Administration | (shift 1) | | |
| Economics | (shift 1) | check | check |
| Business Administration | check | | |
| Commerce | check | check | check |
| Commerce (Co-Operation) | check | check | |
Science
| Physics | (shift 1) | check | check |
| Chemistry | check | check | check |
| Mathematics | check | check | check |
| Statistics | (shift 1) | check | check |
| Geology | (shift 1) | check | check |
| Geography | (shift 1) | check | |
| Botany | (shift 1) | check | |
| Zoology | (shift 1) | check | check |
| Computer Science | check | check | check |
| Chartered Accountant | check | check | |

== Notable faculty ==
- C. Vijayaraghavachariar (1852-1944): Lecturer in English and Mathematics (1878? - 1881?).
- G. Devaneya Pavanar (1902-1981): Professor of Tamil during 1944-1956.
- M. Naganathan (c.1944-): Assistant Professor during November 1970 - 1971; later Vice-Chairman of Tamil Nadu State Planning Commission (2006-2011).

== Notable alumni ==
- Perunchithiranar (1933-1995): Tamil poet and Tamil nationalist; B.A. Tamil
- Kolathur Mani (b. 1948): President of Dravidar Viduthalai Kazhagam (DVK); Pre-university course (1964–65)
- P. Dhanapal (b.1951): Former Speaker of the Tamil Nadu Legislative Assembly; B.A. History
- Brammarajan (b.1953): Tamil poet, translator, essayist, critic and editor; B.A. English
- M. Thiravidamani (b.1960): Member of Tamil Nadu Legislative Assembly from Gudalur (2011–21); M.A. History
- Saravanan (b.1966): Tamil actor; B.A. Tamil.
- Taj Noor: film score composer; B.A. Physics

== In popular culture ==
The college is one of the settings in the Tamil film Maamannan (2023).
