= Kumari Kandam =

Mythical lost Tamil continent

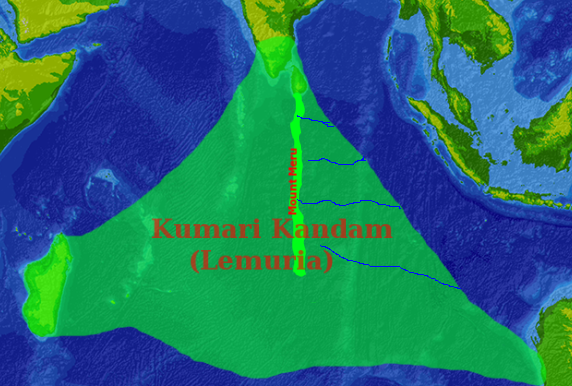
- "Lemuria" in Tamil nationalist mysticist literature as Kumari Kandam, connecting Madagascar, South India, and Australia (covering most of the Indian Ocean)
- First appearance: Kanda Puranam (purportedly alluded to in Sangam literature, but not by this name)

In-universe information
- Type: Mythical continent, believed to be lost
- Locations: Indian Ocean

Kumari Kandam (Tamil: குமரிக்கண்டம், romanized: Kumarikkaṇṭam) is a mythical continent, believed to be lost with an ancient Tamil civilization, supposedly located south of the Indian subcontinent in the Indian Ocean. Alternative names and spellings include Kumarikkandam and Kumari Nadu.

In the 19th century, some European and American scholars speculated the existence of a submerged continent called Lemuria to explain geological and other similarities between Africa, Australia, the Indian subcontinent and Madagascar. A section of Tamil revivalists adapted this theory, connecting it to the Pandyan legends of lands lost to the ocean, as described in ancient Tamil and Sanskrit literature. According to these writers, an ancient Tamil civilisation existed on Lemuria, before it was lost to the sea in a catastrophe.

In the 20th century, the Tamil writers started using the name Kumari Kandam to describe this submerged continent. Although the Lemuria theory was later rendered obsolete by the continental drift (plate tectonics) theory, the concept remained popular among Tamil revivalists of the 20th century. According to them, Kumari Kandam was the place where the first two Tamil literary academies (sangams) were organised during the Pandyan reign. They claimed Kumari Kandam as the cradle of civilisation to prove the antiquity of the Tamil language and culture.

== Etymology and names ==
When the Tamil writers were introduced to the concept of Lemuria in the 1890s, they came up with the Tamilized versions of the continent's name (e.g. "Ilemuria"). By the early 1900s, they started using Tamil names for the continent, to support their depiction of Lemuria as an ancient Tamil civilization. In 1903, V.G. Suryanarayana Sastri first used the term "Kumarinatu" (or "Kumari Nadu", meaning "Kumari territory") in his work Tamil Mozhiyin Varalaru (History of the Tamil language). The term Kumari Kandam ("Kumari continent") was first used to describe Lemuria in the 1930s.

The words "Kumari Kandam" first appear in Kanda Puranam, a 15th-century Tamil version of the Skanda Purana, written by Kachiappa Sivacharyara (1350–1420). Although the Tamil revivalists insist that it is a pure Tamil name, it is actually a derivative of the Sanskrit word "Kumārika Khaṇḍa". The Andakosappadalam section of Kanda Puranam describes the following cosmological model of the universe: There are many worlds, each having several continents, which in turn, have several kingdoms. Bharatan, the ruler of one such kingdom, had eight sons and one daughter. He further divided his kingdom into nine parts, and the part ruled by his daughter Kumari came to be known as Kumari Kandam after her. Kumari Kandam is described as the kingdom of the Earth. Although the Kumari Kandam theory became popular among anti-Brahmin, anti-Sanskrit Tamil nationalists, the Kanda Puranam actually describes Kumari Kandam as the land where the Brahmins reside, where Shiva is worshipped and where the Vedas are recited. The rest of the kingdoms are described as the territory of the mlecchas.

The 20th-century Tamil writers came up with various theories to explain the etymology of "Kumari Kandam" or "Kumari Nadu". One set of claims was centered on the purported gender egalitarianism in the prelapsarian Tamil homeland. For example, M. Arunachalam (1944) claimed that the land was ruled by female rulers (Kumaris). D. Savariroyan Pillai stated that the women of the land had the right to choose their husbands and owned all the property because of which the land came to be known as "Kumari Nadu" ("the land of the maiden"). Yet another set of claims was centered on the Hindu goddess Kanya Kumari. Kandiah Pillai, in a book for children, fashioned a new history for the goddess, stating that the land was named after her. He claimed that the temple at Kanyakumari was established by those who survived the flood that submerged Kumari Kandam. According to cultural historian Sumathi Ramaswamy, the emphasis of the Tamil writers on the word "Kumari" (meaning virgin or maiden) symbolizes the purity of Tamil language and culture, before their contacts with the other ethnic groups such as the Indo-Aryans.

The Tamil writers also came up with several other names for the lost continent. In 1912, Somasundara Bharati first used the word "Tamilakam" (a name for the ancient Tamil country) to cover the concept of Lemuria, presenting it as the cradle of civilization, in his Tamil Classics and Tamilakam. Another name used was "Pandiya Nadu", after the Pandyas, regarded as the oldest of the Tamil dynasties. Some writers used "Navalan Tivu" (or Navalam Island), the Tamil name of Jambudvipa, to describe the submerged land.

== Submerged lands in ancient literature ==
Multiple ancient and medieval Tamil and Sanskrit works contain legendary accounts of lands in South India being lost to the ocean. The earliest explicit discussion of a katalkol ("seizure by ocean", possibly tsunami) of Pandyan land is found in a commentary on Iraiyanar Akapporul. This commentary, attributed to Nakkeerar, is dated to the later centuries of the 1st millennium CE. It mentions that the Pandyan kings, an early Tamil dynasty, established three literary academies (Sangams): the first Sangam flourished for 4,400 years in a city called Tenmadurai (South Madurai) attended by 549 poets (including Agastya) and presided over by gods like Shiva, Kubera and Murugan. The second Sangam lasted for 3,700 years in a city called Kapatapuram, attended by 59 poets (including Agastya, again). The commentary states that both the cities were "seized by the ocean", resulting in loss of all the works created during the first two Sangams. The third Sangam was established in Uttara (North) Madurai, where it is said to have lasted for 1,850 years.

Nakkeerar's commentary does not mention the size of the territory lost to the sea. The size is first mentioned in a 15th-century commentary on Silappatikaram. The commentator Adiyarkunallar mentions that the lost land extended from Pahruli river in the north to the Kumari river in the South. It was located to the south of Kanyakumari, and covered an area of 700 kavatam (a unit of unknown measurement). It was divided into 49 territories (natu), classified in the following seven categories:

- Elu teñku natu ("Seven coconut lands")
- Elu Maturai natu ("Seven mango lands")
- Elu munpalai natu ("Seven front sandy lands")
- Elu pinpalai natu ("Seven back sandy lands")
- Elu kunra natu ("Seven hilly lands")
- Elu kunakarai natu ("Seven coastal lands")
- Elu kurumpanai natu ("Seven dwarf-palm lands")

Other medieval writers, such as Ilampuranar and Perasiriyar, also make stray references to the loss of antediluvian lands to the south of Kanyakumari, in their commentaries on ancient texts like Tolkappiyam. Another legend about the loss of Pandyan territory to the sea is found in scattered verses of Purananuru (dated between 1st century BCE and 5th century CE) and Kaliththokai (6th–7th century CE). According to this account, the Pandyan king compensated the loss of his land by seizing an equivalent amount of land from the neighboring kingdoms of Cheras and Cholas.

There are also several other ancient accounts of non-Pandyan land lost to the sea. Many Tamil Hindu shrines have legendary accounts of surviving the floods mentioned in Hindu mythology. These include the prominent temples of Kanyakumari, Kanchipuram, Kumbakonam, Madurai, Sirkazhi and Tiruvottiyur. There are also legends of temples submerged under the sea, such as the Seven Pagodas of Mahabalipuram, the remains of which were discovered after the 2004 Indian Ocean earthquake and tsunami. The Puranas place the beginning of the most popular Hindu flood myth – the legend of Manu – in South India. The Sanskrit-language Bhagavata Purana (dated 500 BCE–1000 CE) describes its protagonist Manu (aka Satyavrata) as the Lord of Dravida (South India). The Matsya Purana (dated 250–500 CE) also begins with Manu practicing tapas on Mount Malaya of South India. Manimeghalai (dated around 6th century CE) mentions that the ancient Chola port city of Kaverippumpattinam (present-day Poompuhar) was destroyed by a flood. It states that this flood was sent by the Hindu deity Indra, because the king forgot to celebrate a festival dedicated to him.

None of these ancient texts or their medieval commentaries use the name "Kumari Kandam" or "Kumari Nadu" for the land purportedly lost to the sea. They do not state that the land lost by the sea was a whole continent located to the south of Kanyakumari. Nor do they link the loss of this land to the history of Tamil people as a community.

== Lemuria hypothesis in India ==
In 1864, the English zoologist Philip Sclater hypothesized the existence of a submerged land connection between India, Madagascar and continental Africa. He named this submerged land Lemuria, as the concept had its origins in his attempts to explain the presence of lemur-like primates (strepsirrhini) on these three disconnected lands. Before the Lemuria hypothesis was rendered obsolete by the continental drift theory, a number of scholars supported and expanded it. The concept was introduced to the Indian readers in an 1873 physical geography textbook by Henry Francis Blanford. According to Blanford, the landmass had submerged due to volcanic activity during the Cretaceous period. In late 1870s, the Lemuria theory found its first proponents in the present-day Tamil Nadu, when the leaders of the Adyar-headquartered Theosophical Society wrote about it (see the root race theory).

Most European and American geologists dated Lemuria's disappearance to a period before the emergence of modern humans. Thus, according to them, Lemuria could not have hosted an ancient civilization. However, in 1885, the Indian Civil Service officer Charles D. Maclean published The Manual of the Administration of the Madras Presidency, in which he theorized Lemuria as the proto-Dravidian urheimat. In a footnote in this work, he mentioned Ernst Haeckel's Asia hypothesis, which theorized that the humans originated in a land now submerged in the Indian Ocean. Maclean added that this submerged land was the homeland of the proto-Dravidians. He also suggested that the progenitors of the other races must have migrated from Lemuria to other places via South India. This theory was also cursorily discussed by other colonial officials like Edgar Thurston and Herbert Hope Risley, including in the census reports of 1891 and 1901. Later, Maclean's manual came to be cited as an authoritative work by the Tamil writers, who often wrongly referred to him as a "scientist" and a "Doctor".

The native Tamil intellectuals first started discussing the concept of a submerged Tamil homeland in the late 1890s. In 1898, J. Nallasami Pillai published an article in the philosophical-literary journal Siddhanta Deepika (aka The Truth of Light). He wrote about the theory of a lost continent in the Indian Ocean (i.e. Lemuria), mentioning that the Tamil legends speak of floods which destroyed the literary works produced during the ancient sangams. However, he also added that this theory had "no serious historical or scientific footing".

=== Popularization in Tamil Nadu ===
In the 1920s, the Lemuria concept was popularized by the Tamil revivalists to counter the dominance of Indo-Aryans and Sanskrit. Tamil revivalist writers claimed that Lemuria, prior to its deluge, was the original Tamil homeland and birthplace of Tamil civilization. They often misquoted or miscited the words of Western scholars to grant credibility to their assertions. During the British era, the loss of small patches of lands to cyclones was cataloged in several district reports, gazetteers, and other documents. The Tamil writers of the period cited these as evidence supporting the theory about an ancient land lost to the sea.

==== In curriculum ====
The books discussing the Kumari Kandam theory were first included in the college curriculum of the present-day Tamil Nadu in 1908. Suryanarayana Sastri's book was prescribed for use in Madras University's Master's degree courses in 1908-09. Over the next few decades, other such works were also included in the curriculum of Madras University and Annamalai University. These include Purnalingam Pillai's A Primer of Tamil Literature (1904) and Tamil literature (1929), Kandiah Pillai's Tamilakam (1934), and Srinivasa Pillai's Tamil Varalaru (1927). In a 1940 Tamil language textbook for ninth-grade students, T. V. Kalyanasundaram wrote that Lemuria of the European scholars was Kumarinatu of the Tamil literature.

After the Dravidian parties came to power in the 1967 Madras State elections, the Kumari Kandam theory was disseminated more widely through school and college textbooks. In 1971, the Government of Tamil Nadu established a formal committee to write the history of Tamilakam (ancient Tamil territory). The state education minister R. Nedunceliyan declared in the Legislative Assembly that by "history", he meant "from the time of Lemuria that was seized by the ocean".

In 1971, the Government of Tamil Nadu constituted a committee of historians and litterateurs, headed by M. Varadarajan. One of the objectives of the committee was to highlight "the great antiquity" of the Tamils. A 1975 textbook written by this committee detailed the Kumari Kandam theory, stating that it was supported by "the foremost geologists, ethnologists, and anthropologists". As late as 1981, the Tamil Nadu government's history textbooks mentioned the Kumari Kandam theory.

== Characteristics ==
Tamil writers characterized Kumari Kandam as an ancient, but highly advanced civilization located in an isolated continent in the Indian Ocean. They also described it as the cradle of civilization inhabited solely by the speakers of Tamil language. The following sections describe these characteristics in detail.

=== Isolated ===
Kumari Kandam is theorized as an isolated (both temporally and geographically) land mass. Geographically, it was located in the Indian Ocean. Temporally, it was a very ancient civilization. Many Tamil writers do not assign any date to the submergence of Kumari Kandam, resorting to phrases like "once upon a time" or "several thousands of years ago". Those who do, vary greatly, ranging from 30,000 BCE to the 3rd century BCE. Several other writers state that the land was progressively lost to the sea over a period of thousands of years. In 1991, R. Mathivanan, then Chief Editor of the Tamil Etymological Dictionary Project of the Government of Tamil Nadu, claimed that the Kumari Kandam civilization flourished around 50,000 BCE, and the continent submerged around 16,000 BCE. This theory was based on the methodology recommended by his teacher Devaneya Pavanar.

The isolation resulted in the possibility of describing Kumari Kandam as a utopian society insulated from external influences and foreign corruption. Unlike its description in the Kanda Puranam, the Tamil revivalists depicted Kumari Kandam as a place free of the upper-caste Brahmins, who had come to be identified as descendants of Indo-Aryans during the Dravidian movement. The non-utopian practices of the 20th century Tamil Hindu society, such as superstitions and caste-based discrimination, were all described as corruption resulting from Indo-Aryan influence.

A land lost to the ocean also helped the Tamil revivalists provide an explanation for the lack of historically verifiable or scientifically acceptable material evidence about this ancient civilization. The earliest extant Tamil writings, which are attributed to the third Sangam, contain Sanskrit vocabulary, and thus could not have been the creation of a purely Tamil civilization. Connecting the concept of Lemuria to an ancient Tamil civilization allowed the Tamil revivalists to portray a society completely free of Indo-Aryan influence. They could claim that the various signs of the ancient Tamil civilization had been lost in the deep ocean. The later dominance of Sanskrit was offered as another explanation for the deliberate destruction of ancient Tamil works. In the 1950s, R. Nedunceliyan, who later became Tamil Nadu's education minister, published a pamphlet called Marainta Tiravitam ("Lost Dravidian land"). He insisted that the Brahmin historians, being biased towards Sanskrit, had deliberately kept the knowledge of the Tamil's greatness hidden from the public.

=== Connected with South India ===
The Kumari Kandam proponents laid great emphasis on stating that the Kanyakumari city was a part of the original Kumari Kandam. Some of them also argued that entire Tamil Nadu, entire Indian peninsula (south of the Vindhya Range) or even entire India were a part of Kumari Kandam. This helped ensure that the modern Tamils could be described as both indigenous people of South India and the direct descendants of the people of Kumari Kandam. This, in turn, allowed them to describe the Tamil language and culture as the world's oldest.

During British Raj, Kanyakumari was a part of the Travancore state, most of which was merged to the newly-formed Kerala state after the 1956 reorganization. The Tamil politicians made a concerted effort to ensure that Kanyakumari was incorporated into the Tamil-majority Madras State (now Tamil Nadu). Kanyakumari's purported connection with Kumari Kandam was one of the reasons for this effort.

=== Cradle of civilization ===
According to the Kumari Kandam proponents, the continent was submerged when the last ice age ended and the sea levels rose. The Tamil people then migrated to other lands, and mixed with the other groups, leading to the formation of new races, languages and civilizations. Some also theorize that the entire humanity is descended from the inhabitants of Kumari Kandam. Both narratives agree on the point that the Tamil culture is the source of all civilized culture in the world, and Tamil is the mother language of all other languages in the world. According to the most versions, the original culture of Kumari Kandam survived in Tamil Nadu.

As early as 1903, Suryanarayana Sastri, in his Tamilmoliyin Varalaru, insisted that all the humans were descendants of the ancient Tamils from Kumari Kandam. Such claims were repeated by several others, including M. S. Purnalingam Pillai and Maraimalai Adigal. In 1917, Abraham Pandithar wrote that Lemuria was the cradle of human race, and Tamil was the first language spoken by the humans. These claims were repeated in the school and college textbooks of Tamil Nadu throughout the 20th century.

M. S. Purnalingam Pillai, writing in 1927, stated that the Indus Valley Civilisation was established by the Tamil survivors from the flood-hit Kumari Nadu. In the 1940s, N. S. Kandiah Pillai published maps showing migration of the Kumari Kandam residents to other parts of the world. In 1953, R. Nedunceliyan, who later became the education minister of Tamil Nadu, insisted that the civilization spread from South India to the Indus Valley and Sumer, and subsequently, to "Arabia, Egypt, Greece, Italy, Spain and other places". They presented modern Tamil as a pale remnant of the glorious ancient Tamil language spoken in Kumari Kandam.

Some Tamil writers also claimed that the Indo-Aryans were also descendants of proto-Dravidians of Kumari Kandam. According to this theory, these Indo-Aryans belonged to a branch which migrated to Central Asia and then returned to India. Similar explanations were used to reconcile the popular theory that proto-Dravidians migrated to India from the Mediterranean region. A 1975 Government of Tamil Nadu college text book stated that the Dravidians of Kumari Kandam had migrated to the Mediterranean region after the submergence of their continent; later, they migrated back to India via the Himalayan passes.

=== Primordial but not primitive ===
The Tamil revivalists did not consider Kumari Kandam as a primitive society or a rural civilization. Instead, they described it as a utopia which had reached the zenith of human achievement, and where people lived a life devoted to learning, education, travel and commerce. Sumanthi Ramaswamy notes that this "placemaking" of Kumari Kandam was frequently intended as a teaching tool, meant to inspire the modern Tamils to pursue excellence. But this pre-occupation with "civilization" was also a response to the British rulers' projection of the Europeans as more civilized than the Tamils.

Suryanarayan Sastri, in 1903, described the antediluvian Tamils as expert cultivators, fine poets and far-traveling merchants, who lived in an egalitarian and democratic society. Savariroyan Pillai, writing a few years later, described Kumari Kandam as a seat of learning and culture. Sivagnana Yogi (1840–1924) stated that this ancient society was free of any caste system. Kandiah Pillai, in a 1945 work for children, wrote that Kumarikandam was ruled by a strong and just emperor called Sengon, who organized the sangams. In 1981, the Government of Tamil Nadu funded a documentary film on Kumari Kandam. The film, personally backed by the Chief Minister M. G. Ramachandran and directed by P. Neelakantan, was screened at the Fifth International Conference of Tamil Studies in Madurai. It combined the continental drift theory with the submerged continent theory to present Lemuria as a scientifically valid concept. It depicted Kumari Kandam cities resplendent with mansions, gardens, arts, crafts, music and dance.

=== Alleged lost works ===
The Tamil revivalists insisted that the first two Tamil sangams (literary academies) were not mythical, and happened in the Kumari Kandam era. While most Tamil revivalists did not enumerate or list the lost Sangam works, some came up with their names, and even listed their contents. In 1903, Suryanarayana Sastri named some of these works as Mutunarai, Mutukuruku, Mapuranam and Putupuranam. In 1917, Abraham Pandithar listed three of these works as the world's first treatises of music: Naratiyam, Perunarai and Perunkuruku. He also listed several rare musical instruments such as the thousand-stringed lute, which had been lost to the sea. Devaneya Pavanar printed an entire list of the submerged books. Others listed books on a wide range of topics, including medicine, martial arts, logic, painting, sculpture, yoga, philosophy, music, mathematics, alchemy, magic, architecture, poetry, and wealth. Since these works had been lost to the sea, the Kumari Kandam proponents insisted that no empirical proof could be provided for their claims.

In 1902, Chidambaranar published a book called Cenkonraraiccelavu, claiming that he had 'discovered' the manuscript from "some old cudgan [sic] leaves". The book was presented as a lost-and-found work of the first Sangam at Tenmadurai. The author of the poem was styled as Mutaluli Centan Taniyur ("Chentan who lived in Taniyur before the first deluge"). The work talked about the exploits of an antediluvian Tamil king Sengon, who ruled the now-submerged kingdom of Peruvalanatu, the region between the rivers Kumari and Pahruli. According to Chidambaranar, Sengon was a native of Olinadu, which was located south of the Equator; the king maintained several battleships and conquered lands as far as Tibet. In 1950s, Cenkonraraiccelavu was declared as a forgery by S. Vaiyapuri Pillai. However, this did not stop the Tamil revivalists from invoking the text. The 1981 documentary funded by Government of Tamil Nadu declared it as the "world's first travelogue".

== Extent ==
The medieval commentator Adiyarkunallar stated that the size of the land south of Kanyakumari, lost to the sea was 700 kavatam. The modern equivalent of kavatam is not known. In 1905, Arasan Shanmugham Pillai wrote that this land amounted to thousands of miles. According to Purnalingam Pillai and Suryanarayana Sastri, the number was equivalent to 7000 miles. Others, such as Abraham Pandither, Aiyan Aarithan, Devaneyan and Raghava Aiyangar offered estimates ranging from 1,400 to 3,000 miles. According to U. V. Swaminatha Iyer, only the land amounting in area to only a few villages (equivalent to the Tamil measure of two kurram) was lost. In 1903, Suryanarayana Sastri suggested that Kumari Kandam extended from the present-day Kanyakumari in North to Kerguelen Islands in South, and from Madagascar in the West to Sunda Islands in the East. In 1912, Somasundara Bharati wrote that the continent touched China, Africa, Australia and Kanyakumari on four sides. In 1948, Maraimalai Adigal stated that the continent stretched as far as the South Pole. Somasundara Bharati offered an estimate of 6000–7000 miles.

=== Maps ===
The first map to visualize Lemuria as an ancient Tamil territory was published by S. Subramania Sastri in 1916, in the journal Centamil. This map was actually part of an article that criticized the pseudohistorical claims about a lost continent. Sastri insisted that the lost land mentioned in Adiyarkunallar's records was barely equivalent to a taluka (not larger than a few hundred square miles). The map depicted two different versions of Kumari Kandam: that of Sastri, and that of A. Shanmugam Pillai (see above). The lost land was depicted as a peninsula, similar to the present-day Indian peninsula.

In 1927, Purnalingam Pillai published a map titled "Puranic India before the Deluges", in which he labeled the various places of Kumari Kandam with names drawn from ancient Tamil and Sanskrit literary works. Pulavar Kulanthai, in his 1946 map, was first to depict cities like Tenmaturai and Kapatapuram on the maps of Kumari Kandam. Several maps also depicted the various mountain ranges and rivers of Kumari Kandam. The most elaborate cartographic visualization appeared in a 1977 map by R. Mathivanan. This map showed the 49 nadus mentioned by Adiyarkunallar, and appears in the Tamil Nadu government's 1981 documentary.

A 1981 map published by N. Mahalingam depicted the lost land as "Submerged Tamil Nadu" in 30,000 BCE. A 1991 map, created by R. Mathivanan, showed a land bridge connecting Indian peninsula to Antarctica. A few Tamil writers also depicted Gondwanaland as Kumari Kandam.

== Criticism of the concept ==
Kumari Kandam is a mythical continent, and therefore, the attempts to mix this myth with Tamil history have attracted criticism since the late 19th century. One of the earliest criticisms came from M Seshagiri Sastri (1897), who described the claims of ante-diluvial sangams as "a mere fiction originated by the prolific imagination of Tamil poets." CH Monahan wrote a scathing review of Suryanarayana Sastri's Tamilmoliyin Varalaru (1903), shortly after its publication, accusing the author of "abandoning scientific research for mythology". K. N. Sivaraja Pillai (1932) similarly stressed on the need to closely examine the historical authenticity of Sangam works and their commentaries.

In 1956, K. A. Nilakanta Sastri described the Kumari Kandam theory as "all bosh", stating that geological theories about events happening millions of years ago should not be connected to the human history of a few thousand years back. Historian N. Subrahmanian, writing in 1966, described the Lemuria myth as the most characteristic example of "anti-history" in Tamil Nadu. He noted that these myths persisted in the minds of Tamil people despite modern education. According to him, the land lost to sea, as described in the ancient Tamil legends, was a small area comparable to a present-day district, and submerged around 5th or 4th century BCE.

The same view is also shared by historian K. K. Pillay. He writes

... to accept this is not to accept the view that the entire Lemuria or Gondvana continent existed in the age of the Tamil Sangam, as is sometimes believed. Some of the writers on the Tamil Sangam might have held that the first Tamil Academy flourished in South Madurai which according to them lay to the south of the tip of present South India. This view has been sought to be reinforced by the Lemurian theory. But it is important to observe that the Lemurian continent must have existed, if at all, long long ago. According to geologists, the dismemberment of the Lemurian or Gondvana continent into several units must have taken place towards the close of the Mesozoic era.

== See also ==
- Atlantis
- Doggerland
- Evolution of lemurs, primate from Madagascar
- Lost city
- Legends of Mount Shasta
- Lemuria
- Mauritia
- Mu
- Phantom island
- Ramtha
