= Kuadam =

Human settlement in India

- Location in Tamil Nadu, India
- 8.48°N 78.116°E
- Location: Tirunelveli, India

Kuadam (also known as Kua or more popularly Kapadapuram) was the capital of the ancient Pandian kingdom of the Meen'Koodal epoch (the second Sangam academy). The grand old poet and sage Nakkeerar and the Iraiyanaar porul'urai mentions that Kuadam was the capital from c.5400 BCE to c.1750 BCE (about 3650 years).

According to historians, Kuadam was very close to Tiruchendur. Abraham Pandithar says that Greeks in those days named it as Periplus port.

Around 1750 BCE, the last great deluge flooded Kuadam and the remaining part of the Kumari kaandam forever (similar to the Biblical record of "the flood" sometime between 3402 BC and 2462 BC).

Kuadam was to the north of the ancient Paqruli river about 700 kaadham south of the Kumari river delta.

== Cataclysms mid-2000 BCE and similarities ==
Another ancient city lost to cataclysm in mid-2nd millennium BCE is Kapata modern day Crete. The Bible mentions this city as "Caphtor" or "Capthor" as the country of the Philistines. In the texts of Mari, Kaptara appears "beyond the upper sea".The designation "Keftiu" of Crete by the Egyptians comes mainly from the tomb of Rekmira, Egypt.

According to David McAlpin and his Elamo-Dravidian hypothesis, the Dravidian languages were brought to India by immigration into India from Elam, located in present-day southwestern Iran. In the 1990s, Renfrew and Cavalli-Sforza have also argued that Proto-Dravidian was brought to India by farmers from the Iranian part of the Fertile Crescent. According to Gareth Alun Owens, Linear A represents the Minoan language, which Owens classifies as a distinct branch of Indo-European potentially related to Greek, Sanskrit, Hittite, Latin, etc.

The "Pallava" dynasty appears in the Sanskrit Literature as Pallas, Pahlavas, Pahnavas, Palhava, Plavas. The Tamil Vanni were one of ancient sea faring traders and it is well known fact that the Pandyas once traded with the Greeks and Romans.
