= Government Arts College =

Government Arts College may refer to one of the following art schools in India:

- Government Arts College, Ambedkar Veedhi, in Ambedkar Veedhi, K.R. Circle, Bangalore, Karnatka
- Government Arts College, Coimbatore, in Tamil Nadu
- Government Arts College, Dharmapuri, in Tamil Nadu
- Government Arts College, Karur, in Thanthonimalai, Karur, Tamil Nadu
- Government Arts College, Kumbakonam, in Tamil Nadu
- Government Arts College, Ooty, in Tamil Nadu
- Government Arts College, Rajahmundry, in Andhra Pradesh
- Government Arts College for Women, Ramanathapuram, in Tamil Nadu
- Government Arts College, Salem, in Tamil Nadu
- Government Arts College, Thiruvananthapuram, in Kerala
