= Perunchithiranar (Tamil nationalist) =

Indian writer and Tamil nationalist (1933–1995)

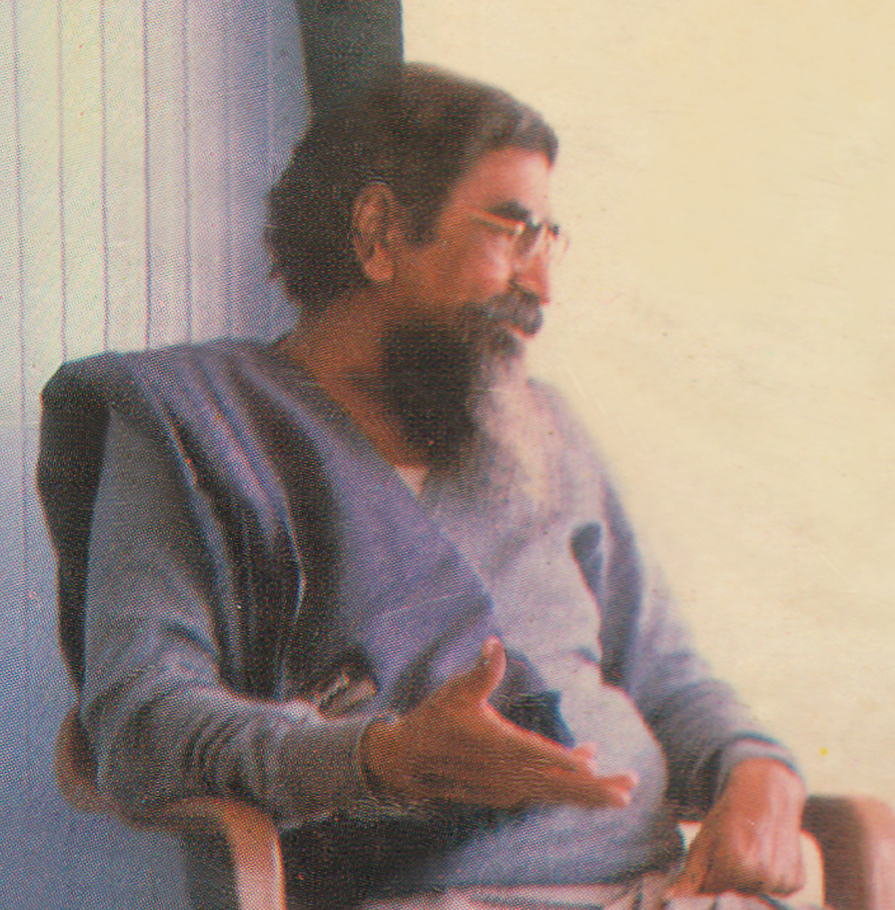
- Photograph of Perunchitthiranaar.
- Born: Rajamanickam; 10 March 1933; Samudram, Salem District, Madras Presidency, British India (now Tamil Nadu, India)
- Died: 11 June 1995 (aged 62); Madras (now Chennai), Tamil Nadu, India
- Other names: Durai Manickam; Pavalareru Perunchithiranar
- Occupations: Writer, Poet, Thani Tamil activist.

Duraisamy Rajamanickam (10 March 1933 – 11 June 1995), better known by his pen name Perunchithiranar or popularly as "Pavalareru" Perunchithiranar, was a Pure Tamil scholar, poet, journalist, and political activist from Tamil Nadu, India. In a writing career that spanned over five decades, he composed more than 40 works, including Koyyaakkani (1956) and Kanichaaru (1979). From 1959 onwards, he ran a magazine Theṉmoḻi in collaboration with his mentor G. Devaneya Pavanar (1902-81).

In the socio-political front, Perunchithiranar adhered to Communism, Periyarism, and Tamil nationalism. He was a staunch opponent of caste system, Hindi imposition, and the 1975-77 Indian Emergency. He worked and wrote extensively in favour of independence of Tamil Eelam (from Sri Lanka) and Tamil Nadu (from India).

Perunchithiranar is regarded as one of the foremost Tamil scholars of the twentieth century. His works have been nationalized by the Government of Tamil Nadu. He is also revered by Tamil nationalists as the "Father of Tamil Nationalism". Various organizations and educational foundations are run by Perunchitranar's descendants.

== Early life ==
He was born Rajamanickam on 10 March 1933 in Samudram, a village near Jalakandapuram in Salem district of present-day Tamil Nadu. He was the second child and first son of Kunjammal (died 1994) and Duraisamy, a head constable. After Rajamanickam, his parents had a son and three daughters. Rajamanickam's paternal grandfather was employed as a tea plantation labourer in the Hill Country region of British Ceylon (now Sri Lanka) and died there.

Initially, Perunchithiranar added the prefix of his father's name to his name and maintained it as 'Duraimanickam'. The 'richness' of the Samudram town surrounded by mountains is said to have instilled in him a passion for nature.

== Education, political interests, and initial literary works ==
Perunchithiranar was schooled in Salem and Attur. At the age of nine, he ran a handwritten magazine named Kuḻantai (lit. "Baby"). In his tenth year, he ran another handwritten magazine named Malarkkāṭu (lit. "Flower Forest") under the pseudonym "Arunamani". He also drew illustrations for these magazines. During his school years, he composed the following poems: Mallikai (1945), Pūkkāri (1945), and Iyaṟkaiyum Tamiḻum (1947; published in the monthly magazine Pakuttaṟivu in 1952). During this time, he also won in a debate show titled "Pen or Tongue?" (conducted by the Tiruchirappalli branch of the All India Radio), in which he spoke in favour of the Pen (literally 'writing skill').

He gained an interest in Communism and Periyarism by the time he turned 13, having participated in the meetings conducted by the Communist Party of India (CPI) and "Periyar" E.V. Ramasamy's Dravidar Kazhagam (DK). He also attended in public meetings held by C. N. Annadurai's Dravida Munnetra Kazhagam (DMK), which split from the DK.

In high school, he was a student of Salem Natesan and "Tamil Maravar" V. Ponnambalam (in Class 10). He also conducted a night school for younger students.

After schooling, he went to Salem Municipal College (now Government Arts College, Salem) and studied under G. Devaneya Pavanar, Ulaka Ūḻiyaṉār, and A. Kamatchi Kumarasamy. He also developed an interest in the ideas of B. R. Ambedkar. Having a strong admiration for the songs of Bharathidasan, he took Mallikai and Pūkkāri with him as he went to meet the poet at Pondicherry (now Puducherry) in 1949. Although refusing initially to see those poems (due to a 'fault' in one of those works) Bharathidasan later printed Pookari his own press (renaming it as Koyyaakkani. Pavanar wrote the foreword for this book.

== Government job and writing career ==
After college, Perunchithiranar worked as a junior supervisor and accountant in the co-operative department of Salem district during 1952-54. Later, he worked for some time as a clerk in the forest department at Anchetty, a village near Hosur in present-day Krishnagiri district. Towards the end of 1954, he moved to Pondicherry and worked as a clerk in the city's postal department for five years. At that time he became more acquanted with Bharathidasan.

In 1959 he got a transfer and went to Cuddalore. On 1 August 1959, he started a magazine called Theṉmoḻi (lit. "Southern Language") as per the wish of Pavanar (who had by that time joined the Department of Lexicography at Annamalai University, Chidambaram). As was in government service, he wrote under the pseudonym "Perunchithran" instead of "Durai. Manickam". The magazine was published with of Pavanar as the special editor and Perunchithiran as the editor-in-chief. The member-editors were M. L. Thangappa, M. Tamilkudimagan, V.V. Paalai Ezhilendhi, Sembian alias Panneershelvam and others. Students from Annamalai University too contributed to the magazine.

Each issue of Theṉmoḻi featured the following poem on the front page above the editorial:

"No begging other people! For the harm they might do,

[we have] no fear; Without ruling [our] language and [our] country

[we] won't sleep. Hence, if the Tamils join shoulders and rise,

There would be none in the world to oppose them!"

After 16 issues, the magazine briefly stopped publication due to financial problems. It resumed publication in 1963 and was well received by college students and Tamil writers.

From 1961 to 1965, Perunchithiranar served as Deputy Postmaster at Cuddalore Post Office.

He published over a dozen Tamil books during his lifetime. He also founded and edited two more magazines, Tamilsittu and Tamil Nilam.

== Political activism and imprisonments ==
=== Agitation against Hindi imposition ===
During the 1965 Anti-Hindi agitations, he printed and distributed leaflets on behalf of Theṉmoḻi against Hindi imposition. He also published a poem and an editorial in the magazine against M. Bhaktavatsalam the then Chief Minister of Madras State (now Tamil Nadu). As he refused to take the option of paying ₹. 200 as fine, he was sentenced to four months of rigorous imprisonment and was confined in Vellore Central Prison from 17 November 1965 to 16 January 1966. He was fired from his post office citing the sentence. While in prison, he wrote the first volume of Aiyai, a Pure Tamil poem.

=== Opposition to the 1975-77 Emergency ===
After the Indian Emergency came into effect in June 1975, Perunchithiranar was imprisoned on 5 February 1976 under the Maintenance of Internal Security Act (MISA). While serving time, he finished writing the second part of Aiyai. In 1979, he compiled and published many of his songs (written over the years) in 1979 as three volumes under the name Kanicharu.

=== Other imprisonments ===
On 26 January 1993, he was arrested and jailed for seven months under the Terrorism and Disruptive Activities (Prevention) Act (TADA), due to alleged controversial remarks in his poem regarding the 1991 Assassination of Rajiv Gandhi.

In total, Perunchithiranar went to jail more than 20 times. Among the works written during these imprisonments is Tirukkuṟaḷ Meypporuḷurai, a commentary on the famous Thirukkural by Thiruvalluvar.

== Linguistic and socio-political stances ==
He worked for the Thani Tamil Iyakkam (Tamil: தனித் தமிழ் இயக்கம்) (Pure or Independent Tamil Movement). It is a linguistic-purity movement which attempts to avoid loanwords from Sanskrit. He was a rationalist, which reflected in his writings.

== Personal life ==
On 25 April 1951, Perunchithiranar had married Kamalam (later "Thamarai"), daughter of Chellammal and Chinnasamy from Salem. He and Thamarai had six children: Porkodi, Poongundran, Thenmozhi, Chithira Chenthaazhai, Pozhilan, and Pirainuthal.

== Legacy ==
His book Koyyakkani was used as post-graduate text in the 1980s and another book Ayyai was used as undergraduate text in the 1970s at the University of Madras.
