= M. S. Purnalingam Pillai =

Munirpallam Sivasubramaniam Purnalingam Pillai
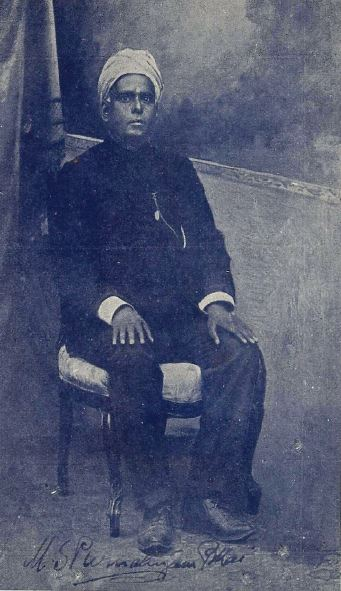
- M.S.Purnalingam Pillai in 1936
- Born: Purnalingam; 25 May 1866; Munirpallam, Tinnevely District, British India
- Died: 6 June 1947 (aged 81); Madras, British India
- Occupation: Madras Christian College faculty
- Writing career
- Language: Tamil, English
- Period: 1898 - 1945
- Notable works: Ravana, The Great King of Lanka
- Literary movement: Tanittamil Iyakkam

Munnirpallam Sivasubramaniam Purnalingam Pillai (25 May 1866 – 6 June 1947) was a Tamil language-writer and Dravidologist.

== Early life ==
Purnalingam Pillai was born on 25 May 1866 to Sivasubramaniam Pillai at Munnirpallam in Tinnevely district. His parents belonged to a Saiva Vellalar family. After his initial education, Pillai joined as a lecturer of English at the Madras Christian College. During this period, Pillai got interested in studying Tamil history and civilization. He edited a Tamil journal called Gnanabodhini along with Parithimar Kalaignar.

== Dravidology and political activism ==
In 1904, Pillai published the first comprehensive study of Tamil literature as a historical narrative, titled A Primer of Tamil Literature. The narration was strongly imbibed with a Dravidian supremacist point of view. In the early 1920s, when excavations at Harappa and Mohenjodaro were in their nascent stages, Pillai, along with another Dravidologist, T. R. Sesha Iyengar, predicted that future discoveries would establish beyond doubt that the Indus Valley civilization was of Dravidian origin and also along with it the antiquity of Tamil civilization and language. He translated the entire Tirukkural into English in prose and published it in 1942.

== Works ==
- M. S. Purnalingam Pillai (1898). The matriculation reader. Thompson and Co.
- M. S. Purnalingam Pillai (1904). A Primer of Tamil Literature. Ananda Press.
- M. S. Purnalingam Pillai (1913). Full notes on A.T. Quiller Couch's historical tales from Shakespeare and Washington Irving's England's rural life and Christmas customs. P. R. Rama Ayyar & Co.
- M. S. Purnalingam Pillai (1914). Studies and Critiques. P. R. Rama Iyer.
- M. S. Purnalingam Pillai (1915). Ten Tamil saints: sketches of their lives, works and teachings, together with bibliographies. G. A. Natesan.
- M. S. Purnalingam Pillai (1923). Ravana, The Great King of Lanka. Bibliotheca.
- M. S. Purnalingam Pillai (1929). Critical Studies in Kural. Bibliotheca.
- M. S. Purnalingam Pillai (1929). St. Manickavasakar: his life and teachings. Bibliotheca.
- M. S. Purnalingam Pillai (1934). Saint Appar. South India Saiva Siddhanta Works Publishing Society Ltd.
- M. S. Purnalingam Pillai (1945). Tamil India. South India Saiva Siddhanta Works Publishing Society Ltd.

== See also ==
- List of translators into English

== Bibliography ==
- Sheldon I. Pollock (2003). Literary cultures in history: reconstructions from South Asia. University of California. pp. 289–290. ISBN 978-0-520-22821-4.
- Ramaswamy, Sumathy (1997). Passions of the tongue: language devotion in Tamil India, 1891-1970. University of Chicago Press. ISBN 978-0-520-20805-6. OCLC 36084635.
