= Tamil activism =

Articles on Tamil activism:

- Tamil nationalist activism:
  - anti-Brahminism
  - Self-respect movement
  - Dravidar Kazhagam
- Tamil linguistic activism
  - Tanittamil Iyakkam
  - Anti-Hindi agitations
