= Pahruli =

In Tamil literature, Pahruli (Tamil:பஃறுளி, Pahruli) is an ancient river located in the sunken landmass of Kumari Kandam. The Silappadhikaram, one of the Five Great Epics of Tamil Literature written in the first few centuries CE, states that the 'cruel sea took the Pandiyan land that lay between the rivers Pahruli and the mountainous banks of the Kumari, to replace which the Pandiyan king conquered lands belonging to the Chola and Chera kings (Maturaikkandam, verses 17–22).
