= Rajagopal Muthukumaraswamy =

Rajagopal Muthukumaraswamy (2 December 1936 –15 August 2017) was an Indian publisher, librarian, translator and a Tamil scholar. He is also the Managing Director of South India Saiva Siddhanta Works Publishing Society Ltd., (also known as Kazhagam).

== Biography ==
Muthukumaraswamy has been known to Tamil research scholars for more than 6 decades. As a writer he has contributed in translating famous English classics such as Kadathapatta David (David Copperfield), Wakefield Pathariyar (The Vicar of Wakefield), Karumani Malar (Black Tulip), Thayathu (Talisman) by Sir Walter Scott, Sirumi Eithi (Heidi) by Johanna Spyri, Indira Priyadharshani & 1008 Commemoration Bibliography. He has also compiled a bibliography of Tamil books jointly with Dr. S. R. Ranganathan, the father of the Library Movement of India.

Born in Chennai, Muthukumaraswamy had his education in Madras. After graduation in 1957 he trained in Library Science. Education: B.A. (Hons) (Tamil Literature) (1957) Pachaiyappa's College, M.A. (1958), D.L.S. (1959), B.Lib.Sc. (1961).

In 1980, he joined as the General Manager of South India Saiva Siddhanta Works Publishing Society Ltd. and was promoted to Managing Director in 1983. Apart from publishing old manuscripts and rare books, the Kazhagam is running a library called Maraimalai Adigal Library which was started in remembrance of Maraimalai Adigal and he started his career as a Librarian from this library. The library is considered important to Tamil Research Scholars. As a librarian he has helped more than 500 scholars to prepare their Thesis for Ph.D., M.Litt., & M.Phil., degree. He showed keen interest in collecting papers related to Tamil and Tamils history & culture. Likewise, few of the collections was utilized to publish a book in 1946 called Madras Presidency Tamil Sangam this is recorded by the author in the book called 'Antinomies of modernity essay' & his work is also recorded in another book called The Province of the Book as, 'The publishing house Saiva Siddhanta Kazhagam, which has a central place in Tamil publishing history. V. Subbiah Pillai and his heir apparent R. Muthukumaraswamy had built this library over the years as the place for Tamil imprints'. Also, he is the editor of the Tamil literary Magazine called SenTamizh Selvi.

=== Posts held ===
- 1960-1970: Secretary - Madras Library Association, Madras.
- 1963 : Member - Indian Standards Institution, Library Committee, Madras Chapter.
- 1967 : Secretary - IInd International Tamil Conference - Exhibition Committee.
- 1981 : Secretary & Treasurer Vth International Tamil Conference, Madurai. (Paper Studies & Seminar Area - Madurai Kamaraj University
- 2003-2005: President BAPASI -Chennai Book Fair.

=== Awards ===
- Dr. S. R. Ranganathan Award for Library Service.
- Federation of Indian Publishers Award for leading Tamil Publishing service.
- Sentamizh Selvar virudhu by the Government of Tamil Nadu
