= Devaneya Pavanar Award =

The Devaneya Pavanar Award is an award given by the Government of Tamil Nadu to scholars who excel in Tamil lexicography, etymology, and dictionary compilation. The award has been presented annually since 2020.

The award, which recognizes those who have made significant contributions to the prosperity and development of the Tamil language, carries a cash prize of Rs. 0.2 million and a gold medal. The award was instituted by the Government of Tamil Nadu to honour the legacy of the scholar and linguist Devaneya Pavanar.

== Qualifications ==
This award is given to a scholar who excels in the field of lexicography and demonstrates a commitment to Tamil research. This includes Tamil etymology, dictionary creation, and the development of the Tamil language in accordance with traditional grammatical rules, focusing on vocabulary without the use of foreign loanwords.

== Recipients ==
Year	Recipient
2020	K. Sivamani
2021	K. Arasendran
2022	R. Mathivanan
2023	P. Aruli
2024	P. R. Subramanian
