= Devaneya Pavanar =

Indian scholar and linguistic writer (1902–1981)

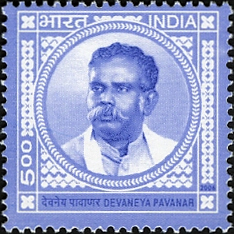
- Pavanar on a 2006 stamp of India
- Born: 7 February 1902; Gomathimuthupuram, Madras Presidency, British India (now in Tamil Nadu, India)
- Died: 15 January 1981 (aged 78); Madurai, Tamil Nadu, India
- Occupations: Author, Tamil Activist, Etymologist

Devaneya Pavanar (also known as G. Devaneyan, Ñanamuttan Tevaneyan; 7 February 1902 – 15 January 1981) was an Indian scholar who wrote over 35 research volumes on Tamil language and literature. Additionally, he was a staunch proponent of the "Pure Tamil movement" and initiated the Etymological Dictionary Project primarily to bring out the roots of Tamil words and their connections and ramifications with Nostratic studies.

In his 1966 Primary Classical language of the World, he argues that the Tamil language is the "most natural" (iyal-moḻi) and also a proto-world language, being the oldest (thon-moḻi) language of the world, from which all other major languages of the world are derived. He believed that its literature, later called Sangam literature and usually considered to have been written from 200 BCE and 300 CE, spanned a huge period from 10,000 to 5,500 BCE. Mainstream linguists, geologists and historians do not subscribe to his theories.

Devaneya Pavanar composed many musical pieces (Isaik kalambakam) and many noteworthy poems, including the collection of Venpa. The title Senthamiḻ Selvar was conferred on him by the Tamil Nadu State Government in 1979, and he was also addressed as Dravida Mozhi nool Nayiru ("Sun of Dravidian languages").

== Biography ==
Gnanamuthu Devaneyan Pavanar was a Tamil professor at Municipal College, Salem, from 1944 to 1956. From 1956 to 1961, he was the head of Dravidian department at Annamalai University. He was a member of the Tamil Development and Research Council, set up by the Nehru government in 1959, entrusted with producing Tamil school and college textbooks. From 1974, he was director of the Tamil Etymological Project, and he acted as president of the International Tamil League, Tamil Nadu. (U. Tha. Ka.).

The Chennai District Central Library is named after Devanaya Pavanar and is located at Anna Salai, Chennai.

== Views on Tamil versus Sanskrit ==
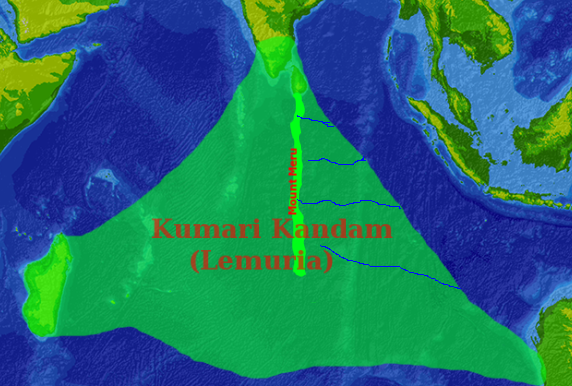
"Lemuria" according to Pavanar, connecting Madagascar, South India and Australia (covering most of the Indian Ocean). Mount Meru stretches southwards from Sri Lanka.

Pavanar's Vadamoli Varalaru argues that hundreds of Sanskrit words can be traced to a Tamil origin, and at the same time he insisted that pure Tamil equivalents existed for Sanskrit loan words. He claimed that Tamil is a "superior and more divine" language than Sanskrit. In his view the Tamil language originated in "Lemuria" (இலெமூரியா Ilemūriyā), the cradle of civilisation. He believed that evidence of Tamil's antiquity was being suppressed by Sanskritists.

Pavanar's timeline for the evolution of mankind and Tamil is as follows:

- ca. 500,000 BC: origin of the human race,
- ca. 200,000 to 50,000 BC: evolution of "the Tamilian or Homo Dravida ",
- c. 200,000 to 100,000 BC, beginnings of Tamil
- c. 100,000 to 50,000 BC, growth and development of Tamil,
- 50,000 BC: Kumari Kandam civilisation
- 20,000 BC: A lost Tamil culture on Easter Island which had an advanced civilisation
- 16,000 BC: Lemuria submerged
- 6087 BC: Second Tamil Sangam established by a Pandya king
- 3031 BC: A Chera prince wandering in the Solomon Islands saw wild sugarcane and started cultivation in Tamil Nadu.
- 1780 BC: The Third Tamil Sangam established by a Pandya king
- 7th century BC: Tolkāppiyam, the earliest extant Tamil grammar

In the preface to his 1966 book The Primary Classical Language of the World he wrote:

There is no other language in the whole world as Tamil, that has suffered so much damage by natural and human agencies, and has been done so much injustice by malignant foreigners and native dupes.

The general belief that all arts and sciences are progressively advancing with the passage of time, is falsified in the case of philology, owing to the fundamental blunder of locating the original home of the Tamilians in the Mediterranean region, and taking Sanskrit, a post-Vedic semi-artificial composite literary dialect, the Indian Esperanto, so to speak, for the prototype of the Indo-European Form of Speech.

Westerners do not know as yet, that Tamil is a highly developed classical language of Lemurian origin, and has been, and is being still, suppressed by a systematic and co-ordinated effort by the Sanskritists both in the public and private sectors, ever since the Vedic mendicants migrated to the South, and taking utmost advantage of their superior complexion and the primitive credulity of the ancient Tamil kings, posed themselves as earthly gods (Bhu-suras) and deluded the Tamilians into the belief, that their ancestral language or literary dialect was divine or celestial in origin.

In a chapter entitled Tamil more divine than Sanskrit, Pavanar gives the reasons why he judges Tamil to be "more divine" than Sanskrit, arguing for "Primary Classicality of Tamil", he enumerates:

Tamil Language	Sanskrit Language
Primitive and original.	Derivative.
Spoken and living language.	Semi-artificial literary dialect.
Scriptural studies exoteric.	Scriptural studies esoteric.
Inculcation of cosmopolitanism.	Division of society into numerous castes on the basis of birth and parentage.
Admission of all to asceticism.	
Holding higher education common to all.	
Encouragement of gifts to all the poor and needy.	Enjoinment on the donors to give only to the Sanskritists.
Love of truth.	Love of imposture and plagiarism.
Laying of emphasis on love, as means of attaining eternal bliss.	Laying of emphasis on knowledge, as means of attaining union with the universal soul.
Having a system of sacrifices to minor deities as religion.	Having monotheistic Saivism and Vaisnavism as religions.
Literary description natural.	Literary description imaginary.

== Publishing history ==
The Central Plan Scheme for Classical Tamil of the Centre of Excellence for Classical Tamil recommends

"To publish the translated but not yet published Sattambi Swamigal's Adhibhasa which seeks to establish that Tamil is the most ancient language. When published, it will provide an impetus to Pavanar's findings"

The literary works and books of Pavanar have been "nationalised" by the Government of Tamil Nadu in the course of the "Golden Jubilee year of National Independence" (2006). This means that the copyright for Pavanar's work is now owned by the state of Tamil Nadu, his legal heirs having been compensated financially.

== Awards and honours ==
- A Silver plate presented to him by the Tamil Peravai, Salem in 1955 in appreciation of his service to Tamil.
- A Copper Plate presented to his by the Governor of Tamil Nadu 1960 in appreciation of his contribution to the collection of administrative terms in Tamil.
- A Silver Plate presented to his by the South Indian Saiva Sinddhanta Works Publishing Society, Thirunelveli Ltd., in 1970 in appreciations of his research work in Tamil philology and etymology.
- Official centenary celebrations of Pavanar were held at Sankarankoil (5 February 2002) and Gomathimuthupuram (6 February) of Tirunelveli district and at Chennai (8. February), attended by the Minister for Education and the Chief Minister O. Panneerselvam.
- In February 2006, a commemorative stamp of Devaneya Pavanar was released by the Postal Department in Chennai.
- In October 2007, a memorial was installed at Madurai by the Government of Tamil Nadu in honour of Devaneya Pavanar.

Tamil

- Kaṭṭurai varaiviyal., Tirucci : Śrī Nilaiyam Accukkūṭam, 1940.
- Cuṭṭu viḷakkam, allatu, Aṭippaṭai vērccol aintu., Tirucci : Impīriyal Piras, 1943.
- Tirāviṭattāy = The mother of the Dravidian languages, Ceṉṉai : Purōkireciv Accumaṇi Patippakam, [1969]
- Vērccoṟ kaṭṭuraikaḷ ("etymological essays"), Ceṉṉai :Saiva Siddantha Kazhagam Publisher, 1973.
- Maṇṇil viṇ : allatu, Vaḷḷuvar kūṭṭūtamai, Kāṭṭuppāṭi Virivu, Va. Ā. Māvaṭṭam : Nēcamaṇi Patippakam, 1978.

posthumously:

- Nāṅkaḷ kāṇum Pāvāṇar : Moḻiñāyiṟu Pāvāṇar avarkaḷiṉ mutalām niṉaivu nāḷ veḷiyīṭu., Neyvēli, Tamiḻnāṭu : Pāvāṇar Tamiḻk Kuṭumpam, 1982.
- Pāvāṇar kaṭitaṅkaḷ, Ceṉṉai : Tirunelvēli Teṉṉintiya Caivacittānta Nūṟpatippuk Kaḻakam, 1985.
- Centamiḻc coṟpiṟappiyal pērakaramutali, Ceṉṉai : Centamiḻc Coṟpiṟappiyal Akara Mutalit Tiṭṭa Iyakkaka Veḷīyīṭu, 1985–2005
- Paḻantamiḻāṭci, Ceṉṉai : Tirunelvēli Saiva Siddantha Kazhagam Publisher, 1991.
- Paḻantamiḻar araciyal koṭpāṭukaḷ, Ceṉṉai : Maṇivācakar Patippakam, 1999.
- Pāvāṇar mukavuraikaḷ, Tañcāvūr : Tamiḻmati Patippakam, 2001.
- Tamiḻmaṇ Patippakam centenary edition:
  - Uyartarak kaṭṭurai ilakkaṇam, 2000.
  - Tamiḻar matam, 2000.
  - Tamiḻnāṭṭu viḷaiyāṭṭukaḷ, 2000.
  - Centamiḻk kāñci, 2000.
  - Mutaṟṟāy moḻi, 2000.
  - Tamiḻar tirumaṇam, 2000.
  - Iyaṟṟamiḻ ilakkaṇam, 2000.
  - Tamiḻilakkiya varalāṟu, 2000.
  - Oppiyaṉ moḻinūl, Ceṉṉai ("comparative linguistics"), 2000–<2001 >
  - Moḻiyārāyccik kaṭṭuraikaḷ, 2001.
  - Kaṭṭuraik kacaṭaṟai, eṉṉum, Viyāca viḷakkam, 2001.
  - Maṟuppurai māṇpu, 2001.
  - Ilakkaṇak kaṭṭuraikaḷ, 200101.
  - Maṟuppurai māṇpu, 2001.

== Devaneya Pavanar award ==
Devaneya Pavanar award was instituted by the Government of Tamil Nadu to honour the legacy of this renowned Tamil scholar.

== See also ==
- Kumari Kandam
- Maraimalai Adigal
- Tanittamil Iyakkam
- Anti-Hindi agitations
- Indigenous Aryans
- Paleolithic continuity theory
- Divine language
- Nationalism and ancient history
