= Kumaramangalam estate =

Kumaramangalam estate is a Zamindari Gounder (Kongu Vellalar) estate in the Salem and Namakkal districts of Tamil Nadu, India. The estate included vast lands in the Omalur and Sankagiri taluks of Salem district and the Thiruchengode taluk of Namakkal district. The most well known among the zamindars was P. Subbarayan who served as Chief Minister of the Madras Presidency from 1926 to 1930. His son, Mohan Kumaramangalam, daughter Parvathi Krishnan and grandson Rangarajan Kumaramangalam have all served as members of the lower house of the Indian Parliament, the Lok Sabha. Subbarayan's oldest son P. P. Kumaramangalam was a former Chief of the Army Staff.
