= Isai Nunukkam =

Tamil grammar book

Isai Nunukkam is a grammar book for the Tamil language. It was written by Sikandi, before the second Sangam period.
