= Budapuranam =

Budapuranam was a grammar book in Tamil language followed by while second Sangam period.
