= Tamil grammar =

Grammar of the Tamil language

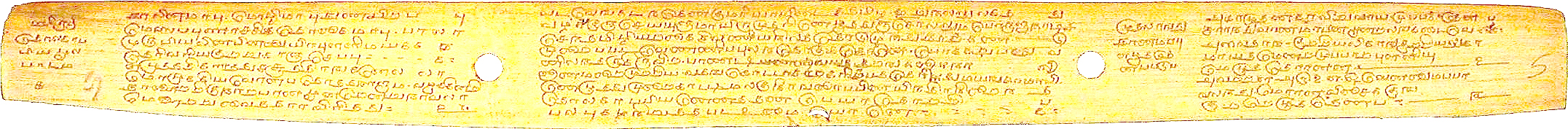
Palm leaf manuscript of Tolkappiyam

Much of Tamil grammar is extensively described in the oldest available grammar book for Tamil, the Tolkāppiyam (dated between 300 BCE and 300 CE). Modern Tamil writing is largely based on the 13th century grammar Naṉṉūl, which restated and clarified the rules of the Tolkāppiyam with some modifications.

== Parts of Tamil grammar ==
Traditional Tamil grammar consists of five parts, namely eḻuttu, sol, poruḷ, yāppu and aṇi. Of these, the last two are mostly applicable in poetry. The following table gives additional information about these parts.

Tamil name	Meaning	Main grammar books
eḻuttu	letter	Tolkāppiyam, Nannūl
sol	word	Tolkāppiyam, Nannūl
poruḷ	content	Tolkāppiyam
yāppu	compilation	Yāpparuṅkalakkārikai
aṇi	decoration	Taṇṭiyalaṅkāram

Eḻuttu (writing) defines and describes the letters of the Tamil alphabet and their classification. It describes the nature of phonemes and their changes with respect to different conditions and locations in the text.

Sol defines the types of the words based on their meaning and the origin. It defines the gender, number, cases, tenses, classes, harmony etc. This chapter also provides rules for compounding the words.

Porul defines the contents of poetry. It gives guidance on which topic to choose for poetry based on certain conditions like the nature of the land or time or the people. It gives a distinction between Agam (internal / love life) and Puram (external / worldly life).

Yāppu defines rules for composing Traditional poetry. It defines the basic building block Asai and describes how asai should be joined to form a sīr, joining sīr for an adi.

Aṇi defines techniques used for comparing, praising and criticizing the taken topics.

== Letters ==
The script of Tamil Language consists of 247 letters. The script falls under the category Abugida, in which consonant-vowel sequences are written as a unit. The grammar classifies the letters into two major categories.

- Prime Letters – முதலெழுத்து mutaleḻuttu
- Dependent Letters – சார்பெழுத்து sārpeḻuttu

=== Prime letters ===
12 vowels and 18 consonants are classified as the prime letters.

- The vowels (உயிரெழுத்துகள் uyireḻuttukaḷ): அ (a), ஆ (ā), இ (i), ஈ( ī), உ (u), ஊ (ū), எ (e), ஏ (ē), ஐ (ai), ஒ (o), ஓ (ō), ஔ (au)
- The consonants (மெய்யெழுத்துகள் meyyeḻuttukaḷ): க், ங், ச், ஞ், ட், ண், த், ந், ப், ம், ய், ர், ல், வ், ழ், ள், ற், ன்

The vowels are called uyir, meaning soul, in Tamil. The consonants are known as mey, meaning body. When the alphasyllabary is formed, the letter shall be taking the form of the consonants, that is the body, and the sound shall be that of the corresponding vowel, that is the soul.

The vowels are categorized based on the length, as short (kuril) and long(nedil). The short vowels are pronounced for a duration 1 unit, while the long vowels take two units. Based on the duration of the sound, the vowels form 5 pairs. The other two vowels ஐ(ai) and ஔ(au) are diphthongs formed by joining the letters அ(a)+இ(i) and அ(a)+உ(u). Since these two are a combination two short letters, their pronunciation takes 2 units of time, that is they fall under nedil category. ஐ(ai) and ஔ(au) can also be spelt அய் and அவ். This form is known as eḻuttuppōli and is generally not recommended.

The consonants are categorised into three groups, வல்லினம் valliṉam (hard), மெல்லினம் melliṉam (soft) and இடையினம் iṭaiyiṉam (medium), based on the nature of the sound. வல்லினம் are various non-nasal consonants, மெல்லினம் are the nasal versions of the corresponding வல்லினம் consonant, and இடையினம் are other non-nasal consonants. Most often, when there is a nasal sound preceding a வல்லினம் consonant, it is the corresponding மெல்லினம் consonant of the said வல்லினம் consonant.

valliṉam	melliṉam	iṭaiyiṉam
க் k	ங் ṅ	ய் y
ச் s	ஞ் ñ	ர் r
ட் ṭ	ண் ṇ	ல் l
த் t	ந் n	வ் v
ப் p	ம் m	ழ் ḻ
ற் ṟ	ன் ṉ	ள் ḷ

From the 30 prime letters, the dependent letters are formed.

=== Dependent letters ===
Tamil grammar defines 10 categories of Dependent letters.

- Alphasyllabic letters உயிர்மெய் எழுத்து uyirmey eḻuttu
- Aidam ஆய்த எழுத்து āyta eḻuttu
- Elongated vowel உயிரளபெடை uyiraḷapeṭai
- Elongated consonant ஒற்றளபெடை oṟṟaḷapeṭai
- Shortened u குற்றியலுகரம் kuṟṟiyalukaram
- Shortened i குற்றியலிகரம் kuṟṟiyalikaram
- Shortened ai ஐகாரக் குறுக்கம் aikārak kuṟukkam
- Shortened au ஔகாரக் குறுக்கம் aukārak kuṟukkam
- Shortened m மகரக்குறுக்கம் makarakkuṟukkam
- Shortened Aidam ஆய்தக்குறுக்கம் āytakkuṟukkam

The alphasyllabic letters – 216 in total – are formed by combining the consonants and the vowels. The duration of the sound is that of the vowel attached to the consonant (or the inherent vowel, in case of the pure consonants). For example, the table below shows the formation of க் based letters.

Combination	Uyirmei form	ISO 15919	IPA
க் + அ	க	ka	[kʌ]
க் + ஆ	கா	kā	[kɑː]
க் + இ	கி	ki	[ki]
க் + ஈ	கீ	kī	[kiː]
க் + உ	கு	ku	[ku], [kɯ]
க் + ஊ	கூ	kū	[kuː]
க் + எ	கெ	ke	[ke]
க் + ஏ	கே	kē	[keː]
க் + ஐ	கை	kai	[kʌj]
க் + ஒ	கொ	ko	[ko]
க் + ஓ	கோ	kō	[koː]
க் + ஔ	கௌ	kau	[kʌʋ]

Aidam is also known as தனிநிலை taṉinilai (stand alone). The aidam is always preceded by a single short letter (தனிக்குறில் taṉikkuṟil) and followed by a hard alphasyllabic letter (வல்லின உயிர்மெய் valliṉa uyirmey). It takes half unit time for pronunciation.

Uyiraḷapeṭai (உயிரளபெடை) and Oṟṟaḷapeṭai (ஒற்றளபெடை) are formed by elongating the duration of pronunciation of a letter to satisfy certain grammatical rules while composing poetry. In Uyiralapetai, the intrinsic vowel of the letter that is elongated is written next to it, to indicate that the letter now is pronounced for 3 units of time.

In Kutriyalukaram, the duration of the short 'u' letters of vallinam category (கு, சு, டு, து, பு, று) is reduced to half units, when the letter is found at the end of the word, preceded by multiple letters or a single nedil(long) letter.

If a word with kutriyalikaram is followed by a word with 'ய'(ya) as the first letter, the u sound is corrupted to i sound and takes a half unit of time for pronunciation.

In Aikarakurukkam and Aukarakurukkam, the duration of the letters ஐ and ஔ are reduced to 1 1/2 units if they are the first letters of the word. If situated elsewhere it is reduced to 1 unit.

== Vanjiyar ==
In Tamil, a single letter standing alone or multiple letters combined form a word. Tamil is an agglutinative language – words consist of a lexical root to which one or more affixes are attached.

Most Tamil affixes are suffixes. These can be derivational suffixes, which either change the part of speech of the word or its meaning, or inflectional suffixes, which mark categories such as person, number, mood, tense, etc. There is no absolute limit on the length and extent of agglutination, which can lead to long words with a large number of suffixes, which would require several words or a sentence in English. To give an example, the word pōkamuṭiyātavarkaḷukkāka (போகமுடியாதவர்களுக்காக) means "for the sake of those who cannot go", and consists of the following morphemes:

go	be possible (impersonal)	epenthetic approximant letter breaks illegal diphthongs	negation (impersonal)	nominalizer he/she who does	plural marker	to	for
pōka	muṭi	y	āta	var	kaḷ	ukku	āka

Words formed as a result of the agglutinative process are often difficult to translate. Today Translations, a British translation service, ranks the Tamil word செல்லாதிருப்பவர் (sellātiruppavar, meaning a certain type of truancy) as number 8 in their The Most Untranslatable Word In The World list.

In Tamil, words are classified into four categories namely,

- Nouns Peyarsol
- Verbs Vinaisol
- Particles and Pre-/Postpositions Idaisol
- Adjective and Adverbs Urisol

All categories of nouns are declinable. Verbs are conjugated to indicate person, tense, gender, number and mood. The other two classes are indeclinable.

== Nouns ==
=== Noun ===
Nouns are inflected based on number and grammatical case, of which there are 9: nominative case, accusative case, dative case, instrumental case, sociative case, locative case, ablative case, genitive case, and vocative case. If the plural is used, the noun is inflected by suffixing the noun stem with first the plural marker -kaḷ, and then with the case suffix, if any. Otherwise, if the singular is used, the noun is instead inflected by suffixing either the noun stem with the case suffix, or the oblique stem with the case suffix. An optional euphonic increment -iṉ or -aṉ can occur before the case suffix.

case	suffix
nominative	-∅
accusative	-ai
instrumental	-āl, -(aik) koṇṭu
sociative	-ōṭu, -uṭaṉ
dative	-(uk)ku, -iṉ poruṭṭu, -iṉ nimittam
benefactive	-(u)kkāka
ablative	-il(ē) iruntu [irrational], -iṭam iruntu [rational], -iṉiṉṟu
genitive	-atu, -uṭaiya
locative	-il(ē) [irrational], -iṭam [rational], -kkul [deeper sense, within]
vocative	-ē, -ā

==== Nominative case ====
The nominative case is used for the subject of an intransitive verb, the agent of a transitive verb, the predicate of a nominal sentence, and subject and object complements. It is the base form of the noun with no suffix.

Kumār māṇavaṉ.	"Kumar (is) (a) student."
Kumār māṇavaṉāka ākiṉṟāṉ.	"Kumar becomes (a) student."
Katavu tiṟantatu.	"The door opened."

It can also be used to mark the direct object when it is indefinite and irrational.

==== Accusative case ====
The accusative case marks the direct object of a transitive verb. It is marked by the suffix -ai. It is required when the direct object is rational. When used with irrational nouns, the accusative must be used when the direct object is definite. When an irrational direct object is indefinite, the nominative is used instead, unless there is an explicit indefinite determiner present, in which case either the nominative or accusative may be used.

Kumār paiyanai pārttāṉ.	"Kumar saw a/the boy."	(rational direct object, the accusative must be used regardless of definiteness)
Nāṉ eṉ cāviyai tolaittēṉ.	"I lost my key."	(irrational direct object, the possessive pronoun eṉ makes the noun definite, the accusative must be used)
Nāṉ cāviyai tolaittēṉ.	"I lost the key."	(irrational direct object, the accusative shows the noun is definite)
Nāṉ cāvi tolaittēṉ.	"I lost a key."	(irrational direct object, the nominative shows the noun is indefinite)
Nāṉ oru cāvi(yai) tolaittēṉ.	"I lost a key."	(irrational direct object, the determiner oru makes the noun explicitly indefinite, accusative is optional)

==== Dative case ====
The dative case is marked with -ukku, -kku, or -ku. It expresses an indirect object, a goal of motion, a purpose, or an experiencer.

Kumār appāvukku oru paṭattai kāṭṭiṉāṉ.	"Kumar showed father a picture."	(indirect object)
Kumār ūrukku pōṉāṉ	"Kumar went to a town."	(goal of motion, in this sense restricted to inanimate nouns)
Kumār taṉ uṭampukku ṭāṉik uṭkoḷkiṟāṉ.	"Kumar takes tonic for his health."	(purpose)
Kumārukku oru vīṭu vēnṭum.	"Kumar wants a house."	(experiencer)

==== Instrumental case ====
The instrumental case is shown with -āl. It marks the instrument, means, source, or reason by which an action occurs.

Kumār kattiyāl paḻattai veṭṭiṉāṉ.	"Kumar cut the fruit with a knife."

It also marks the agent in passive constructions.

Kumār appāvāl aṭikkappaṭṭāṉ.	"Kumar was beaten by father."

==== Sociative case ====
The sociative case is marked with either -ōṭu or -uṭaṉ. The latter is almost only used in poetic and written Tamil. It shows that the noun it modifies is involved in the action of the sentence.

Kumār taṉ maṉaiviyōṭu vantāṉ. Kumār taṉ maṉaiviyuṭaṉ vantāṉ.	"Kumar came with his wife."

==== Locative case ====
The locative case is marked with either -il or -iṭam. -il occurs with inanimate nouns and plural animate nouns, while iṭam occurs with animate nouns in both numbers. It shows location. The locative also has -kkul, which is a deeper sense of being within something.

Kuruvi marattil uṭkārkiṟatu.	"The sparrow is sitting on the tree."
Atu vīṭukkul irukkiṟatu.	"That is within the house."

==== Vocative case ====
The vocative case is marked with multiple suffixes. The two main ones are ē and ā. The ē ending can be used for any word. The ā ending can only be used for words ending with -an or -am (keep in mind that these words that can use the ā ending can still use the ē ending). Along with this, many times, people use other rules to turn words into the vocative case. The word often stays the same or gets stress or an elongated vowel at the end of the word. In colloquial speech and slang, the vocative is often paired with Ey!

Ey! Murugā!	"Hey! Murugan!"
Naaykalē, kadikkaathe.	"Dogs, don't bite."
Aasiriyarē, enne ceyye pōkirōm?	"Teacher, what are we going to do?"
Lakshmiyē, ingae pāru.	"Lakshmi, look here."
Thambi! Engae irukkukiraay!?	"Little brother! Where are you!?"

==== Ablative case ====
The ablative case is expressed through the suffix -iliruntu added onto the locative of a noun. This directly translates to, "after being in/at". It marks motion away from something or getting something from somewhere. This case loosely translates to "from" in English.

Kumār marattiliruntu viḻuntāṉ.	"Kumar fell from the tree."

=== Oblique stems ===
The oblique stem of a noun is used before adding case suffixes, as a modifier in genitive function before a head noun, as the first element of a compound, and before postpositions.

Oblique Stem Formation
Rule	Rule Application	Tamil		English	Notes
Rule	Rule Application	Nominative	Oblique	English	Notes
0	general (doesn't apply to other rules)	peyar	peyar-	name	No change. The nominative is identical to the oblique stem. Most Tamil words belong to this group.
1	ends with -am	maram	maratt(u)-	tree	Final -am is replaced with -att(u).
2	adjective turned into a noun (people who are..., things that are..., etc.)	pala	palavaṟṟ(u)-	many	Consists of only five words. The suffix -aṟṟ(u) is added to the end of the word.
3	ends with -ṭu or -ṟu	vīṭu	vīṭṭ(u)-	house	The consonant in the last syllable -ṭu or -ṟu is doubled, yielding -ṭṭ(u) or -ṟṟ(u). This applies to all words that end in -ṭu or -ṟu, except those consisting of two short syllables.

=== Genders and number ===
The grammatical gender of Tamil nouns corresponds to their natural sex. Nouns in Tamil have two numbers, singular and plural.

Grammatical gender, known as பா pā in Tamil, encompasses both the concepts of gender and number, thus is highly predictable. Masculine and feminine genders are only applicable to "higher class" nouns. Even though the genders of animals are marked in a sentence (e.g.: பெண் நாய் peṇ nāy "female, dog"), grammatically they are handled as a neuter noun. Thus there are five genders in Tamil, namely, masculine singular (ஆண்பால் āṇpāl), feminine singular (பெண்பால் peṇpāl), high-class plural (பலர்பால் palarpāl), lower-class singular (ஒன்றன்பால் oṉṟaṉpāl), lower-class plural (பலவின்பால் palaviṉpāl). These are summarized in the table below.

peyarccol (Name-words/Nouns)
	rational			irrational	
Class	Male	Female	Collective	One	Many
Example: "doer"	ceytavaṉ He who did	ceytavaḷ She who did	ceytavar They who did	ceytatu That which did	ceytavai Those which did

== Pronouns ==
=== Demonstratives and interrogatives ===
இவன் ivan	he, who is near to the 1st person	near deixis, demonstrative particle
உவன் uvan	he, who is near to the 2nd person	distant deixis, demonstrative particle
அவன் avan	he, who is near to the 3rd person or someone not present	distant deixis, demonstrative particle
எவன் evan	who? (male singular)	interrogative particle

In Tamil, the demonstrative particles are a- (அ), i- (இ), and u- (உ) (archaic and has fallen out of use, except in Sri Lankan dialects). These demonstrative particles display deictic properties. i- (இ) is a near deixis form, which demonstrates the objects around/near the first person, while a- (அ) has distant deixis form, which demonstrates things near the 3rd person. u- (உ) was used to indicate objects near the second person, but has gradually fallen out of use. In modern Tamil i- (இ) indicates objects nearer and a- (அ) indicates objects in a distance. Using these particles demonstrative pronouns are derived. The same set of pronouns is also used as personal pronouns in 3rd person. e.g. avan (he), atu (that object/being), anta (that)

e- (எ) and yā- யா are the two important interrogative particles in Tamil. e- (எ) is used for deriving the interrogative pronouns. e.g. evaṉ (which one, 3rd person singular masculine), enta (which), etaṟku (for what?)

=== Personal pronouns ===
First person plural pronouns in Tamil distinguish between inclusive and exclusive we. In Tamil, plural terminators are used for honorific addressing. It could be noted in both 2nd and 3rd persons. There are unique personal pronouns available for first and second persons while demonstrative pronouns are used in place of personal pronouns as well.

Pronoun		English Translation	Person / Gender / Number
Nominative	Oblique	English Translation	Person / Gender / Number
நான் nāṉ	என் eṉ	I	1st / neutral / singular
நாம் nām	நம் nam	Inclusive we	1st / neutral / plural
நாங்கள் nāṅkaḷ	எங்கள் eṅkaḷ	Exclusive we	1st / neutral / plural
நீ nī	உன் uṉ	you	2nd / neutral / singular
நீர் nīr	உம் um	Honorific singular you	2nd / neutral / singular
நீங்கள் nīṅkaḷ	உங்கள் uṅkaḷ	Honorific singular you	2nd / neutral / singular
நீங்கள் nīṅkaḷ	உங்கள் uṅkaḷ	Plural you	2nd / neutral / plural
அவன் / இவன் avaṉ / ivaṉ		He (that/this)	3rd / masculine / singular
அவள் / இவள் avaḷ / ivaḷ		She (that/this)	3rd / feminine / singular
அவர் / இவர் avar / ivar		Honorific he/she (that/this)	3rd / neutral / singular
அவர் / இவர் avar / ivar		They (low class) (that/this)	3rd / neutral / plural
அவர்கள் / இவர்கள் avarkaḷ/ivarkaḷ		They (high class) (that/this)	3rd / neutral / plural
அது / இது atu / itu		It (animals and objects) (that/this)	3rd / neuter / singular
அவை / இவை avai / ivai	அவற்று / இவற்று avaṟṟu / ivaṟṟu	They (animals and objects) (that/this)	3rd / neuter / plural
தான் tāṉ	தன் taṉ	-self (himself, myself, etc)	Reflexive / neutral / singular
தாம் tām	தம் tam	Honorific -self (himself, myself, etc)	Reflexive / neutral / singular
தாங்கள் tāṅkaḷ		-selves (themselves, ourselves, etc)	Reflexive / neutral / plural

== Verbs ==
Like Tamil nouns, Tamil verbs are also inflected through the use of suffixes. A typical Tamil verb form will have a number of suffixes, which show person, number, mood, tense and voice, as is shown by the following example aḻintukkoṇṭiruntēṉ (அழிந்துக்கொண்டிருந்தேன்) "(I) was being destroyed":

Morphemes	aḻi	-ntu	(k)koṇṭiru	-nt-	-ēn
Functions	root (base)	tense-voice marker	aspect marker	tense marker	person-number-gender marker
Functions	"to be destroyed"	affective voice; past (absolutive)	progressive aspect	past tense	first person, singular

Person and number are indicated by suffixing the oblique case of the relevant pronoun (ēṉ in the above example). The suffixes to indicate tenses and voice are formed from grammatical particles, which are added to the stem. The chart below outlines the most common set of suffixes used to conjugate for person and tense, but different groups of Tamil verbs may use other sets of suffixes or have irregularities.

Tamil Verb Classes
Class	Root (Example)	Past	Present	Future
I	cey "to do"	-t- (ceyt-)	-kiṟ^{1}- (ceykiṟ-)	-v- (ceyv-)
II	mīḷ "to be redeemed"	-ṇṭ- (mīṇṭ-)	-kiṟ- (mīḷkiṟ-)	-v- (mīḷv-)
III	kol "to kill"	-ṉṟ- (koṉṟ-)	-kiṟ- (kolkiṟ-)	-v- (kolv-)
IV	vaḷar "to grow (intr.)"	-nt- (vaḷarnt-)	-kiṟ- (vaḷarkiṟ-)	-v- (vaḷarv-)
V	pāṭu "to sing"	-i[ṉ]- (pāṭi[ṉ]-)	-kiṟ- (pāṭukiṟ-)	-v- (pāṭuv-)
VI	pōṭu "to put"	-ṭṭ- (pōṭṭ-)	-kiṟ- (pōṭukiṟ-)	-v- (pōṭuv-)
VII	uṇ "to eat"	-ṭ- (uṇṭ-)	-kiṟ- (uṇkiṟ-)	-p- (uṇp-)
VIII	eṉ "to say"	-ṟ- (eṉṟ-)	-kiṟ- (eṉkiṟ-)	-p- (eṉp-)
IX	kēḷ "to hear, listen, ask"	-ṭṭ- (kēṭṭ-)	-ṭkiṟ- (kēṭkiṟ-)	-ṭp- (kēṭp-)
X	vil "to sell"	-ṟṟ- (viṟṟ-)	-ṟkiṟ- (viṟkiṟ-)	-ṟp- (viṟp-)
XI	vaḷar "to grow (tr.)"	-tt- (vaḷartt-)	-kkiṟ- (vaḷarkkiṟ-)	-pp- (vaḷarpp-)
XII	iru "to be"	-nt- (irunt-)	-kkiṟ- (irukkiṟ-)	-pp- (irupp-)
XIII (irregular)	cā "to die"	– (cett-)	– (cākiṟ-)	– (cāv-)

^{1}The infix -kiṟ- is a shortening of the infix -kiṉṟ-, which is also sometimes used.

Tamil personal terminations
Person	Singular	Honorary Singular	Plural
1st	-ēṉ		-ōm
2nd	-āy	-īr/-īrkaḷ	-īrkaḷ
3rd masc.	-āṉ	-ār	-ār/-ārkaḷ/-aṉar
3rd fem.	-āḷ	-ār	-ār/-ārkaḷ/-aṉar
3rd neu.	-atu^{1}		-aṉa^{2}

^{1}Class X verbs take -iṟṟu added directly to the root (-iṉ + -tu). In the future, -um is added directly to the root of verbs in Classes I through VIII, whereas -um replaces the -iṟ- in the present stem to form the future of verbs in Classes IX through XIII (and no termination is added afterwards).

^{2}This suffix takes an irregular present in -kiṉṟ-/-kkiṉṟ- before it. The -um future (see directly above) can be used in the plural, as well.

Tamil has three simple tenses – past, present, and future – indicated by simple suffixes, and a series of perfects, indicated by compound suffixes. Mood is implicit in Tamil, and is normally reflected by the same morphemes which mark tense categories. These signal whether the happening spoken of in the verb is unreal, possible, potential, or real. Tamil verbs also mark evidentiality, through the addition of the hearsay clitic ām.

Tamil has two voices. The first - used in the example above - indicates that the subject of the sentence undergoes or is the object of the action named by the verb stem, and the second indicates that the subject of the sentence directs the action referred to by the verb stem. These voices are not equivalent to the notions of transitivity or causation, or to the active-passive or reflexive-nonreflexive division of voices found in Indo-European languages.

=== Infinitive ===
For strong verbs, the infinitive is formed by adding -kka to the stem, where if the stem ends in -ru, -lu, -llu, or -ḷu, these get deleted. For weak verbs, the infinitive is usually formed by adding a to the stem, where the final vowel of the stem is always deleted.

=== Participles ===
==== Adjectival participle ====
The adjectival participle is used to form relative clauses and is formed by adding -a to the past or present stem of a verb. The negative adjective participle is formed by adding -āta to the infinitive form of a verb.

==== Adverbial participle ====
The adverbial participle is used form sentences with consecutive verbs, where the first verb is in the adverbial participle form. For most verbs, the adverbial participle is formed by taking its past stem without any marking for person, number, or gender. The negative adverbial participle of a verb is formed by -āmal (-āme in colloquial Tamil) to its infinitive form.

Nān indyāvukku vantu tamiḻ paṭiccēn	"After coming to India, I studied Tamil"
Avan varāme, nān pōyṭṭēn	"Since he didn't come, I left"

==== Verbal noun ====
The verbal nouns is formed by adding a third person pronoun to adjectival participle forms. Positive verbal nouns can have tense, while negative verbal nouns are tenseless.

=== Conditionals ===
The conditional form of verbs is formed by adding -ā(l) to the past stem of a verb. The negative conditional is usually formed by adding -āṭṭ- to the infinitive form of a verb followed by -ā(l).

=== Auxiliaries ===
Tamil has no articles. Definiteness and indefiniteness are indicated either by context or by special grammatical devices, such as using the number "one" as an indefinite article. In the first person plural, Tamil makes a distinction between inclusive pronouns that include the listener and exclusive pronouns that do not. Tamil does not distinguish between adjectives and adverbs – both fall under the category uriccol. Conjunctions are called iṭaiccol.

Verb auxiliaries are used to indicate attitude, a grammatical category which shows the state of mind of the speaker, and his attitude about the event spoken of in the verb. Common attitudes include pejorative opinion, antipathy, relief felt at the conclusion of an unpleasant event or period, and unhappiness at or apprehension about the eventual result of a past or continuing event.

== Sentence structure ==
Except in poetry, the subject precedes the object, and the verb concludes the sentence. In a standard sentence, therefore, the order is usually subject–object–verb (SOV), but object–subject–verb is also common.

Tamil is a null-subject language. Not all Tamil sentences have subjects, verbs, and objects. It is possible to construct valid sentences that have only a verb, such as muṭintuviṭṭatu (முடிந்துவிட்டது, "It is completed"), or only a subject and object, such as atu eṉ vīṭu (அது என் வீடு, "That is my house").

The elements that are present, however, must follow the SOV order. Tamil does not have an equivalent for the existential verb to be; it is included in the translations only to convey the meaning. The negative existential verb, to be not, however, does exist in the form of illai (இல்லை) and goes at the end of the sentence (and does not change with number, gender, or tense). The verb to have in the meaning "to possess" is not translated directly, either. To say "I have a horse" in Tamil, a construction equivalent to "There is a horse to me" or "There exists a horse to me", is used.

Tamil lacks relative pronouns, but their meaning is conveyed by relative participle constructions, built using agglutination. For example, the English sentence "Call the boy who learned the lesson" is said in Tamil like "That-lesson-learned-boy call".

== Example ==
A sample passage in Tamil script with transliteration.

ஆசிரியர் வகுப்புக்குள் நுழைந்தார்.
Āciriyar vakuppukkuḷ nuḻaintār.
The teacher entered the classroom.

அவர் உள்ளே நுழைந்தவுடன் மாணவர்கள் எழுந்தனர்.
Avar uḷḷē nuḻaintavuṭaṉ māṇavarkaḷ eḻuntaṉar.
As soon as he entered, the students got up.

வளவன் மட்டும் தன் அருகில் நின்று கொண்டிருந்த மாணவி கனிமொழியுடன் பேசிக் கொண்டிருந்தான்.
Vaḷavaṉ maṭṭum taṉ arukil niṉṟu koṇṭirunta māṇavi Kaṉimoḻiyuṭaṉ pēcik koṇṭiruntāṉ.
Only Vaḷavaṉ was talking to Kaṉimoḻi who was standing next to him.

நான் அவனை எச்சரித்தேன்.
Nāṉ avaṉai eccarittēṉ.
I warned him.

Word (romanised)	Word (in Tamil Script)	Translation	Morphemes	Part of speech	Person, Gender, Tense	Case	Number	Remarks
āciriyar	ஆசிரியர்	teacher	āciriyar	noun	n/a, gender-neutral, n/a	nominative	honorific plural indicated by suffix ar	The feminine gender āciriyai can be used here too; the masculine gender āciriyaṉ is rarely used, considering the honored position of the teacher
vakuppukkuḷ	வகுப்புக்குள்	inside the class room	vakuppu+-kk- +uL	adverb	n/a	locative	n/a	Sandhi (called puṇarcci in Tamil) rules in Tamil require euphonic changes during agglutination (such as the introduction of y in this case)
nuḻaintār	நுழைந்தார்	entered	nuḻaintār	verb	third, gender-neutral, past		honorific plural	In an honorific context, the masculine and feminine equivalents nuḻaintāṉ and nuḻaintāḷ are replaced by the collective nuḻaintār
avar	அவர்	He	avar	pronoun	third, gender-neutral, n/a	nominative	honorific plural indicated by suffix ar	In honorific contexts, the masculine and feminine forms avaṉ and avaḷ are not used
uḷḷē	உள்ளே	inside	uḷḷē	adverb	n/a		n/a	
nuḻaintavuṭaṉ	நுழைந்தவுடன்	upon entering	nuḻainta + uṭaṉ	adverb	n/a		n/a	Sandhi rules require a v to be inserted between an end-vowel and a beginning-u during agglutination.
māṇavarkaḷ	மாணவர்கள்	students	māṇavarkaḷ	collective noun	n/a, masculine, often used with gender-neutral connotation, n/a	nominative	plural indicated by suffix kaḷ	
eḻuntaṉar	எழுந்தனார்	got up	eḻuntaṉar	verb	third, gender-neutral, past		plural	
Vaḷavaṉ	வாளவன்	VaLavan (name)	Vaḷavaṉ	proper noun	n/a, masculine, usually indicated by suffix aṉ, n/a	nominative	singular	
maṭṭum	மற்றும்	only	maṭṭum	adverb	n/a		n/a	
taṉ	தன்	his (self) own	taṉ	pronoun	n/a, gender-neutral, n/a		singular	
arukil	அருகில்	near (lit. "in nearness")	aruku + il	adverb	n/a	locative	n/a	The postposition il indicates the locative case
niṉṟu koṇṭirunta	நின்று கொண்டிருந்த	standing	niṉṟu + koṇṭu + irunta	adverb	n/a		n/a	The verb has been morphed into an adverb by the incompleteness due to the terminal a
māṇavi	மாணவி	student	māṇavi	pronoun	n/a, feminine, n/a		singular	
Kaṉimoḻiyuṭaṉ	கனிமொழியுடன்	with Kaṉimoḻi (name of a person)	Kaṉimoḻi + uṭaṉ	Proper noun	n/a	comitative	n/a	The name Kaṉimoḻi literally means sweet language
pēcik koṇṭiruntāṉ	பேசிக் கொண்டிருந்தான்	was talking	pēci + koṇṭu +iruntāṉ	verb	third, masculine, past continuous		singular	Continuousness indicated by the incompleteness brought by koṇṭu
nāṉ	நான்	I	nāṉ	pronoun	first person, gender-neutral, n/a	nominative	singular	
avaṉai	அவனை	him	avanai	pronoun	third, masculine, n/a	accusative	singular	The postposition ai indicates accusative case
eccarittēṉ	எச்சரிட்டேன்	cautioned	eccarittēṉ	verb	first, indicated by suffix -ēn, gender-neutral, past		singular, plural would be indicated by substituting -ēn with -ōm	

== Bibliography ==
- A. H. Arden, A progressive grammar of the Tamil language, 5th edition, 1942.
- Schiffman, Harold F. (1998). A Reference Grammar of Spoken Tamil (PDF). Cambridge University Press. pp. 20–21. ISBN 978-0-521-64074-9. Archived (PDF) from the original on 11 April 2024.
- Lehmann, Thomas. A Grammar of Modern Tamil. Pondicherry Institute of Linguistics and Culture, 1989.
