= Mapuranam =

Mapuranam was a grammar book in Tamil language which was considered authoritative during the second Sangam period.
