= Brammarajan =

Indian writer

Brammarajan is the pseudonym of A. Rajaram (born 24 April 1953), an Indian poet, translator, essayist, critic and editor.

== Biography ==
He was born in a family of farmers. He was educated in the erstwhile Bharathi Vidhyalaya High School (present Sri Ramakrishna Saradha Vidayala Higher Secondary School), Subramaniya Nagar in Salem. He did his B.A. degree in English literature in Government Arts College, Maravaneri, Salem. He obtained his master's degree in English language and literature from Annamalai University, securing the first class honors and a gold medal for securing the first rank. He joined government service as an Assistant Professor of English and taught in various government colleges.

His literary career started when he went to help the little magazine named ஃ (AHQ). This magazine was being edited by Paranthaman of Salem. Simultaneously he was translating literary articles and European poets for Tamil readers. His first poetry collection was Arindha Nirandharam அறிந்த நிரந்தரம் (1980). From this early imaginistic phase he moved to a complex metaphoric style in his second (வலி உணரும் மனிதர்கள்) and third collections (ஞாபகச் சிற்பம்). As a translator he has introduced many European poets, including Rilke, Holub, Cesar and Octavio Paz. He has translated and introduced to English speaking readers (from Tamil) a selection of poems from the mystic Siddhars. His own early poems were translated by the veteran translator M. S. Ramaswami.

He has edited the little magazine Meetchi from 1982 to 1992. He read his poems to a national audience during Kavi Bharati held at Bharat Bhavan. He has participated in the World poetry festival conducted by Bharat Bhavan (Bhopal). Presently he serves as the contributing editor for Tamil in the net magazine Muse India. The pathbreaking work published in 1998 was called Pathinainthu iroppiya naveenavaathigal (பதினைந்து ஐரோப்பிய நவீனவாதிகள்). This book introduced many European masters of fiction to Tamil.

His first full length study of the life and achievements of Ezra Pound was published in 1985. He introduced Bertolt Breach to Tamil readers with his slim volume of Brecht poems in 1987. After 15 years of study he went on to present the oeuvre of Jorge Luis Borges (போர்ஹெஸ் கதைகள்) and Italo Calvino (கால்வினோ கதைகள்) in Tamil.

Besides being a poet, writer and translator, Rajaram is also a good painter.

== Poetry ==
- Arindha Nirandharam (அறிந்த நிரந்தரம், 1980)
- Vali Unarum Manithargal (வலி உணரும் மனிதர்கள்)
- Memory Sculpture (ஞாபகச் சிற்பம்)
- Puradhan Idhayam-(Ancient Heart-புராதன இதயம்)
- Maha Vakkiyam (மஹாவாக்கியம்)
- Thernthedutha Kavithaigal (தேர்ந்தெடுத்த கவிதைகள்)
- Zen Mayil (ஜென் மயில்)
- Kadal Patriya Kavithaikal (கடல் பற்றிய கவிதைகள்)

== Critical works ==
- Ezra Pound (எஸ்ரா பவுண்ட்)
- பதினைந்து ஐரோப்பிய நவீனவாதிகள்
- Nadodi Manam (நாடோடி மனம்)

== Anthology ==
- Ulagkkavithai
- Tharkala Naveena Ulgakkavithai

== Translations from English (Fiction) ==
- Borges Kathaigal (போர்ஹெ கதைகள்)
- Calvino Kathaigal (கால்வினோ கதைகள்)

== Translations from English (Poetry) ==
- Bertolt Brecht (பெர்டோல்ட் ப்ரக்ட்)
