= Tanittamil Iyakkam =

20th-century Tamil linguistic-purity movement

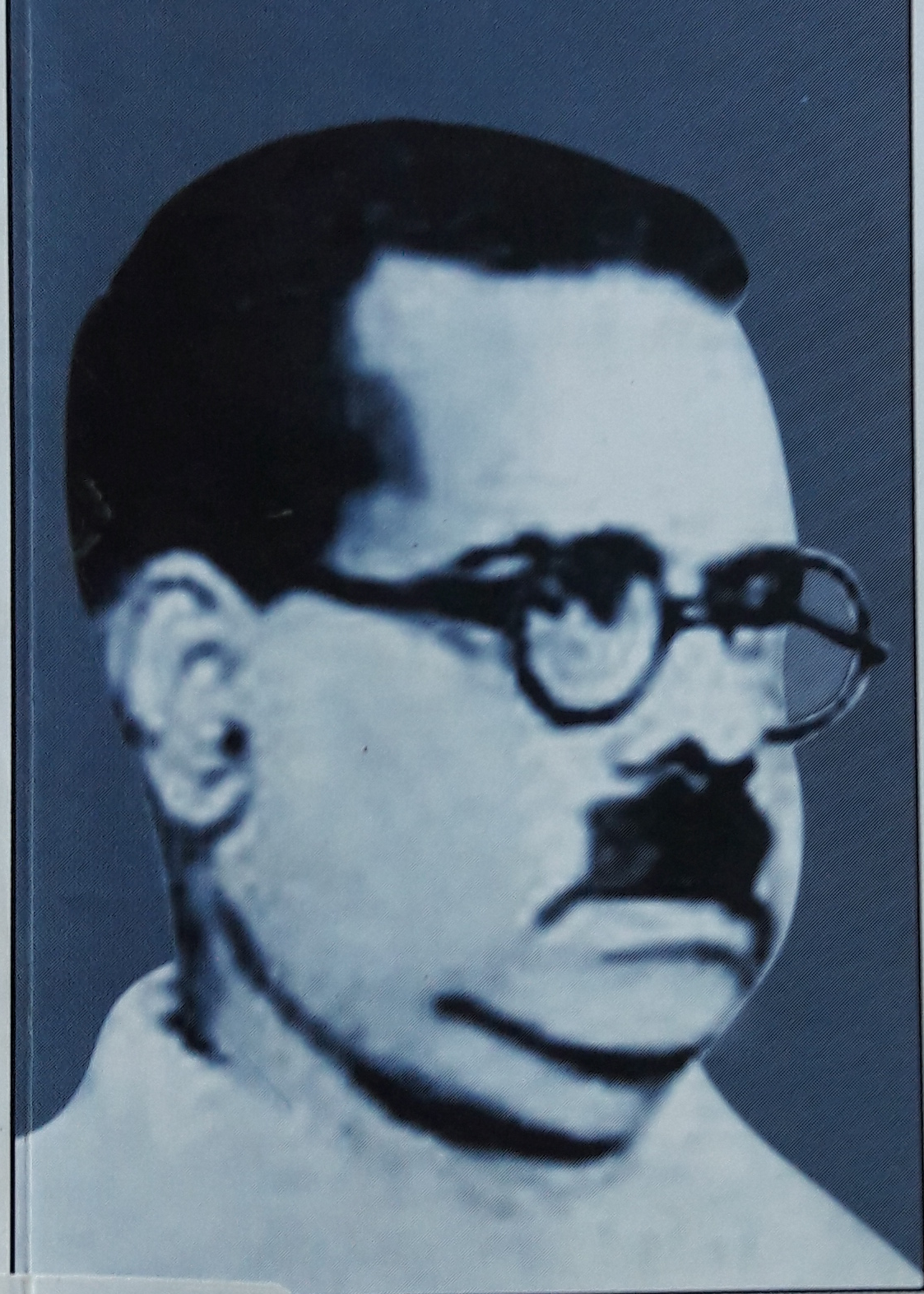
Bharathidasan was one of the early advocates of the movement

Tanittamil Iyakkam (Independent Tamil Movement) is a linguistic purism movement which advocated to remove loanwords from Tamil language. Maraimalai Adigal laid the foundation for the movement in the early 20th century, and it was propagated later through the writings of Bharathidasan, Devaneya Pavanar, Perunchithiranar, and Subramania Siva. In 1902, Parithimar Kalaignar demanded classical language status for Tamil, and the language became the first to be accorded the status by the Government of India in 2004.

== Movement ==
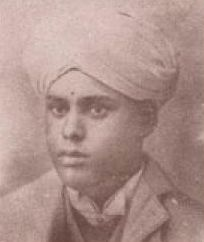
Parithimar Kalaignar changed his Sanskrit name of Suryanarayana Sastri

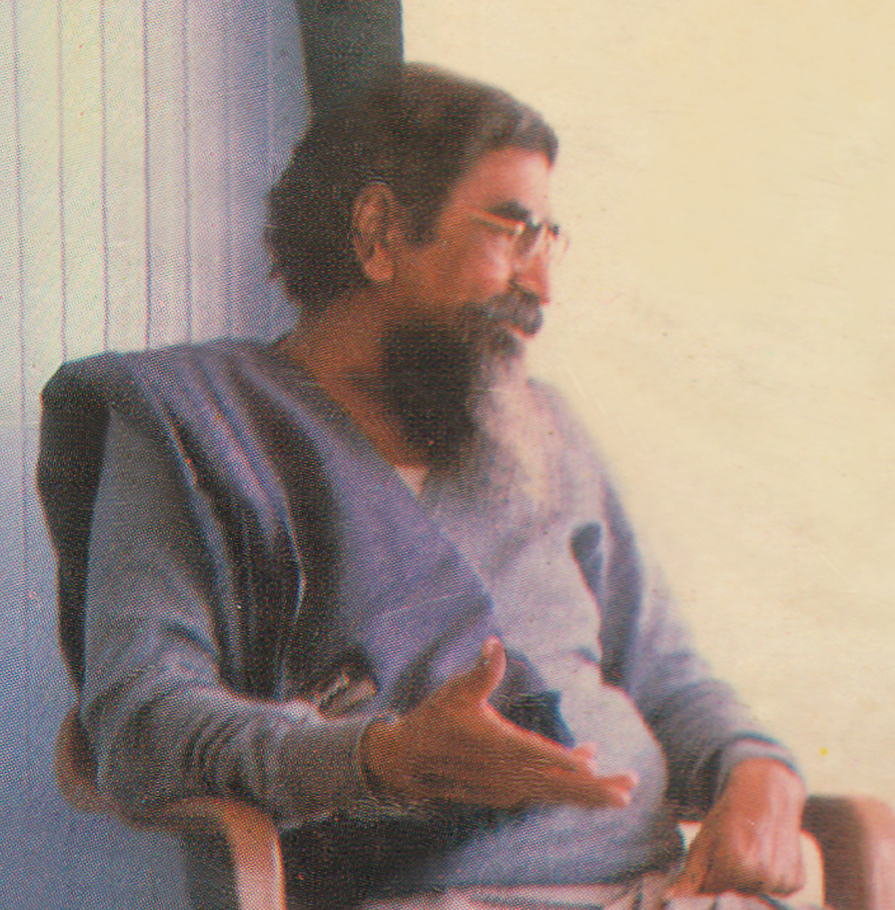
Perunchithiranar was part of the movement

The modern revival of the Tamil Purist Movement (also known as the Pure Tamil Movement) is attributed to Maraimalai Adigal, who publicly pledged to defend pure Tamil in 1916. Advocates of purism popularised Tamil literature and advocated for it, organising rallies in villages and towns and making Tamil purism a political issue. The logical extension of this effort was to purge Tamil of the Sanskrit influence (including its negative social perceptions, which they believed to keep the Tamils in a state of economic, cultural, and political servitude) seen as making Tamil susceptible to northern political domination. Anti-Sanskrit and anti-Hindi Tamil Nadu policies brought them into conflicts with the Brahmins, whose dialect of Tamil incorporates more Sanskrit words than that of other groups.

Tamil was given some national sovereignty by a language policy after Indian independence and had been used in some high schools since 1938 (and in universities from 1960). In 1956, the Indian National Congress government passed a law making Tamil the official language of Tamil Nadu, and in 1959 set up the Tamil Development and Research Council to produce Tamil textbooks in the natural and human sciences, accounting, mathematics, and other subjects. A series of children's encyclopaedias, commentaries on Sangam poetry, and a history of the Tamil people were published in 1962-63. However, these measures seemed insufficient to the proponents of "Pure Tamil", as expressed by Mohan Kumaramangalam in 1965 at the peak of the anti-Hindi agitation:

In practice, the ordinary man finds that the Tamil language is nowhere in the picture ... In Madras city like any other metro, English dominates our life to an extraordinary extent ... I think it will be no exaggeration to say that a person who earns very high can live for years in Madras without learning a word of Tamil, except for some servant inconvenience!

Since the Congress government had turned down a number of demands, such as the use of "pure" rather than "Sanskritised Tamil" in schoolbooks and resisting the name change from Madras to Tamil Nadu until 1969, it seemed unconcerned about separatism. This bred resentment among Tamil purists, as expressed by Devaneya Pavanar in 1967:

None of the Congress Ministers of Tamil Nadu was either a Tamil scholar or a Tamil lover. The Congress leaders of Tamil Nadu as betrayers of Tamil, cannot represent the State any more. Blind cannot lead the blind, much less the keen sighted. Moreover every political meeting, they will say "Jai Hind!". This Means, they are meant to rule only in broader (not specific) India.

In the elections that year, Congress was replaced by the Dravida Munnetra Kazhagam (DMK) government under C N Annadurai.

The Tamil purism movement successfully lobbied for Tamil to be declared a "classical language" of India in 2004, a status also accorded to few other languages (Sanskrit, Telugu, Kannada etc.) later in the Indian constitution. This gave rise to the Centre for the Study of Tamil as a Classical Language in Chennai, but it took another year to obtain official Tamil translations in Tamil Nadu courts.

== See also ==
- Anti-Hindi agitations
- Tamil nationalism
- Devaneya Pavanar
- Tamil language
- Meitei classical language movement
- Sanskritisation (linguistics)
- The Primary Classical Language of the World
