= Maraimalai Adigal =

Tamil orator and writer (1876–1950)

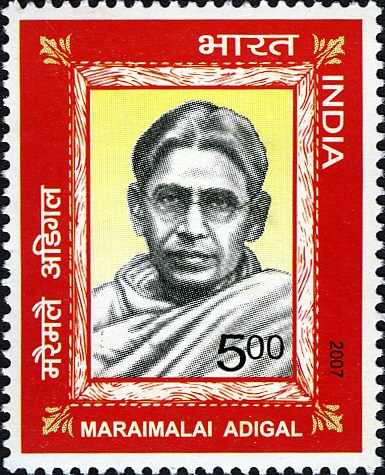
- Adigal on a 2007 stamp of India
- Born: N. C. Vedhachalam Pillai; 15 July 1876; Nagapattinam, Tanjore District, Madras Presidency, British India
- Died: 15 September 1950 (aged 74); Madras, Madras State, India

Maraimalai Adigal (15 July 1876 – 15 September 1950) was a Tamil Saivite writer, orator and father of the Tanittamil Iyakkam movement. He authored more than 100 books, including works on original poems and dramas and notable research works on Tamil literature and Saivism. He founded a Saivite institution called Podhunilaik Kazhagam. He was an exponent of the Tanittamil Iyakkam movement and is considered to be the father of Tamil linguistic purism. He advocated the use of Tamil devoid of Sanskrit words and changed his birth name Vedhachalam to Maraimalai.

Politically, he was inclined towards non-Brahminism and considered the Self-Respect Movement to be an offshoot of his political activism. Though he was a scholar of Tamil, he had good scholastic command over Sanskrit and English. The ideologies of Periyar E. V. Ramasamy were shunned by Maraimalai Adigal and caused years of differences between the two. Maraimalai Adigal spent most of his income buying books and after his death, his collection was made into a library according to his will.

== Early life ==
Maraimalai Adigal was born on 15 July 1876 to Cokkanata Pillai and Cinnammai. His birth name was Vedhachalam. He did his early schooling at Wesley Mission High School in Nagappattinam, but had to abandon his formal education with Fourth Form after his father's death.

== Education in Tamil literature ==
Maraimalai Adigal in spite of discontinuing his formal education after 9th grade, continued learning Tamil from the Tamil scholar Narayana Pillai, who was making his livelihood by selling Tamil palm-leaf manuscripts. He learnt English through his own effort. He later authored several articles in Tamil monthly called Neelalochani. He later studied Saiva philosophy under Somasundara Naicker. With the help of Sundaram Pillai, author of Manonmaniam, he learned Tamil poetic dramas and thus acquired employment as a Tamil teacher in a school in Trivandrum.

== Career ==
At the age of seventeen, he married Soundaravalli and soon after his marriage, he moved to Madras to work as a sub-editor to a journal Siddantha Deepikai. Later, in March 1898, he quit this job to work with V. G. Suryanarana Sastri as a teacher in Madras Christian College. In his time in Madras Christian College he toured throughout Tamil Nadu giving lectures on Saivam. At about the same time he started a society for Saivam called Saiva Siddhanta Maha Samajam. As a young teacher he was popular with his students who would visit his house to listen to his lectures.

In 1910 a decision was made by the Madras University to make the vernacular Tamil language optional for graduation in Arts subjects, leaving English as a medium of education. This decision caused many Tamil teachers to lose their jobs. Realising the vast knowledge and his great capacity as a teacher, Miller, the then Head of Christian College Madras, and other friends insisted that Adigal be given a job in the college. As the opportunity to teach Tamil was considerably reduced and few students opted to study it, the need for a full-time teacher was not a required. Adigal refused the offer and resigned to lead an ascetic life in a serene atmosphere outside the city and to study and do research in Tamil.

== Works in Tamil literature ==
Apart from being a good orator, Adigal composed several Tamil poems. He authored more than 100 books. Other than essays and novels he wrote books dealing with literary criticism, philosophy and religion, history, psychology and politics. His collections of poems to the Hindu god Sri Murugan, which he composed during the times of illness were published as Thiruvotri Muruhar Mummanikkovai in 1900. He also wrote poems from recollections of his teacher Somasundara Naiker in 1901 as Somasundarak Kaanjiaakkam. This has been considered as one of his best works. He also released his research work on Tamil literature Mullaip Pattu Aaraichi for students of Tamil literature. He translated Kalidasa's 'Abhijñānaśākuntalam' into Tamil as Sakuntalai.

Some of his prominent works include:

- Pattinapalaai Aaraaichi-yurai (1906)
- Tamizhthaai (1933)
- Sinthanaikatturaikal (1908)
- Arivuraikkothu (1921)
- Chiruvarkaana Senthamizh (1934)
- Ilainarkaana Inramizh (1957 – posthumous publication)
- Arivuraikkovai (1971 – posthumous publication)
- Maraimalaiyatikal paamanaikkovai (1977 – posthumous publication)

In 1911, he published his first novel, Kumuthavalli allathu Naahanaattarasi, an adaptation of English novel Leela by G. W. M. Reynolds.

He also wrote books on the subjects of self-improvement, self-help and personality development. These included Maranathin pin Manithar Nilai (Human Life stage After Death), Mesmerism and Hypnotism and Tholaivil unarthal (Telepathy).

== As Swami Vedhachalam ==
After quitting his teaching job on 10 April 1911, Adigal moved to Pallavaram, a suburb of Madras. There he began to dress as a Sanyasin from 27 August 1911 and became known as Swami Vedhachalam. He became a devout follower of Saivam and started an institution named Podhunilaik Kazhagam. Once , at a rendezvous in Madras , he met V.O Chidambaram Pillai. The motto of the institution was set at Ondre Kulam, Oruvanae Devan (Mankind is one, and God is one). The Kazhagam made efforts to make people of all castes, creeds and religions to worship Sri Siva together. He started the Thiru Murugan Press (TM Press) in his residence at Pallavaram and published a number of books and magazines. He also started a monthly called Gnaana Saaharam (Ocean of Wisdom).

== Pure Tamil movement Tanittamil Iyakkam ==
In the year 1916 he became an expert of pure Tamil movement advocating the use of Tamil language devoid of loan words from Sanskrit. Thus he changed the name of Gnaana Saaharam to Arivukkadal and his title of Swami Vedhachalam to Maraimalai Adigal (where Adigal is Tamil for Swami). Thus he is referred to as the "Father of Tamil Puritanism".

== Maraimalai Adigal and Self-respect movement ==
=== Non-Brahmin movement ===
Apart from being called as the father of pure Tamil movement, Maraimalai Adigal is also considered to be the father of Non-Brahmin Tamil movements. Maraimalai Adigal himself claimed that the non-Brahmin stance of Self-respect movement was born out of his views and principles. Nevertheless, the atheist stance of Periyar E. V. Ramasamy, who was heading the Self-respect movement, was observed by Maraimalai Adigal and his followers as counter productive. On this issue, Ilavalaganar, a student of Maraimalai Adigal wrote:

Saivism is not one iota different from the primary aim of the Self-respect movement. The Self-respect movement arose to dispel the illusion of Brahmanism from the Tamil people and infuse self-respect into them. Saivism also does the same. The Self-respect Movement detests the Aryan Brahmins. Saivism too doesn't like the Aryan Brahmins one bit... The Self-respect movement wishes to uplift the depressed classes. That is also the basic idea of Saivism.... The Self-respect movement is against caste differences among the Tamil people. Saivism too emphasizes the same point... when there are so many commonalities, why should Saivism and Saivite apostles be deprecated and condemned [by the Self-respect movement].

=== Differences with Self-respect movement ===
Although initially a supporter of the Self-respect movement, which he saw as a non-Brahmin movement, he vehemently opposed the atheistic views of its leadership. At one stage he asked Ulaganatha Mudaliar, brother of Thiru. Vi. Kaliyanasundara Mudaliar (Thiru Vi. Ka as he was popularly known) and an eminent Saivite scholar himself, to arrange for a statewide tour to counter the propaganda of the Self-respect movement. Maraimalai Adigal looked upon the Self-respect movement as a handiwork of the Telugu Vaishnavites. On this Maraimalai Adigal wrote

The leader of the Self-respect movement is a Vaishnavite; his brother too, we come to understand, is a Vaishnavite who has converted many gullible Saivites to Vaishnavism. Their accomplices too are Vaishnavites. Some of the Justice Party leaders too are Vaishnavites. Moreover, not only are they Vaishnavites, they are also Telugu-speakers.

Kalyanasundara Mudaliar, although a Saivite himself, disagreed with Maraimalai Adigal. Kalyanasundaram refused to publish Maraimalai Adigal's essay against Self-respect movement in his journal. The antipathy between Maraimalai Adigal and the members of Self-respect movement was also explicit with Kudiarasu, the political organ of Self-respect movement claiming that Maraimalai Adigal was calling for Periyar to be murdered.

=== Reconciliation ===
Eventually after years of disagreement, both Maraimalai Adigal and Periyar realised that the disagreement is harmful for their interest and worked towards a rapprochement. Periyar offered an unconditional apology to Maraimalai Adigal and in reply, Maraimalai Adigal wrote a series on the Ramayana in Periyar's English language weekly Revolt. Although the apology and reconciliation were at a personal level between Periyar and Maraimalai Adigal, the difference in ideologies still made their followers to cross swords.

== Maraimalai Adigal Library ==
Maraimalai Adigal spent most of his income on buying books. Research on the readership of his book collections show that between 20 April 1923 to 10 August 1930 a total of 1852 people had borrowed his books. The readership included people from Madras Presidency, Sri Lanka, Burma and Malaysia. Upon his death, on 15 September 1950, according to his will, the books were left for the people of Tamil Nadu and thus a library named after him was started in 1958 by the then MD, Padmashri V.Subbiah Pillai of South India Saiva Siddhanta Works Publishing Society Ltd. at Linghi Street, Chennai. by adding more no of rare collection of Tamil books The library was a repertoire of books and journals, some printed way back in 1779. In May 2008, the Tamil Nadu Government helped by allocating a space at Connemara Public Library but the library management is still with the present MD Rajagopal Muthukumaraswamy of South India Saiva Siddhanta Works Publishing Society.
