= Parithimar Kalaignar =

Tamil writer (1870–1903)

Vilacheri Govinda Suryanarayana Sastri
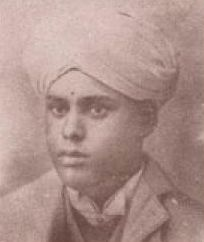
- Born: 6 July 1870; Vilacheri near Thirupparankundram, Madura District, British India
- Died: 2 November 1903 (aged 33); Madras, British India
- Occupation: Tamil pundit
- Writing career
- Pen name: Parithimar Kalaignar, Sastri
- Language: Tamil

Vilacheri Govinda Suryanarayana Sastri (6 July 1870 – 2 November 1903), better known by his pen name, Parithimar Kalaignar, a Professor of Tamil at the Madras Christian College, was the first person to campaign for the recognition of Tamil as a classical language.

== Life ==
Suryanarayana Sastri was born at Vilacheri near Thirupparankundram in a Tamil Brahmin family to Govindan Sivan. He studied philosophy and after graduation was soon employed as a Professor of Tamil in the Madras Christian College. In 1895, Suryanarayana Sastri rose to become the Head of Department for Tamil at the Madras Christian College.

== Campaign for recognition of Tamil as classical language ==
Suryanarayana Sastri had immense love for Tamil and wrote plenty of books. He even changed his Sanskrit name to its Tamil translation (although "Parithi" பரிதி is a Dravidian loanword from Sanskrit परिधि).

When the Madras University proposed to exclude Tamil from its syllabus, Parithimar Kalaignar vehemently protested against the proposal forcing the authorities to drop the move. In 1902, he proposed that Tamil be designated as a "classical language" thereby becoming the first person to make such a petition. Parithimar Kalignar is also known as Dravida Sastri.

Parithimar Kalaignar was also the first to use the Tamil name Kumarinadu for the mythical lost-land of Lemuria.

== Death ==
Paritihimar Kalaignar died in 1903 due to tuberculosis at the age of 33.

== Legacy ==
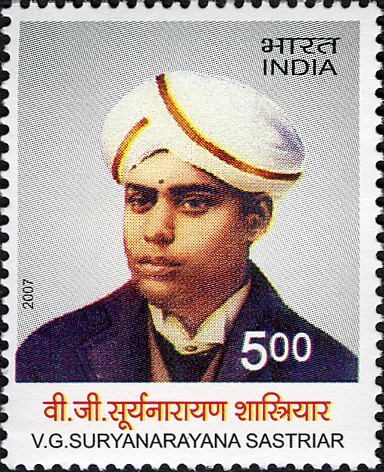
Kalaignar on a 2007 stamp of India

Parithimar Kalaignar is regarded as an inspiration for Tamil enthusiasts as Maraimalai Adigal and the Tanittamil Iyakkam.

In 2006, the Government of Tamil Nadu declared Parithimar Kalaignar's house in his native village of Vilacheri as a memorial and sanctioned a sum of ₹1.5 million (equivalent to ₹4.8 million or US$50,000 in 2023) towards nationalizing his books.

On 17 August 2007, postage stamps were issued in memory of Saint Vallalar, Parithimar Kalaignar and Maraimalai Adigal.

On 13 December 2006, the Tamil Nadu Chief Minister, M. Karunanidhi extended an amount of ₹1.5 million (equivalent to ₹4.8 million or US$50,000 in 2023) to the Tamil scholar's descendants.

== See also ==
- Tanittamil Iyakkam
