= Viswanatha Sastri =

Indian carnatic singer (1893–1958)

Mayuram Viswanatha Sastri
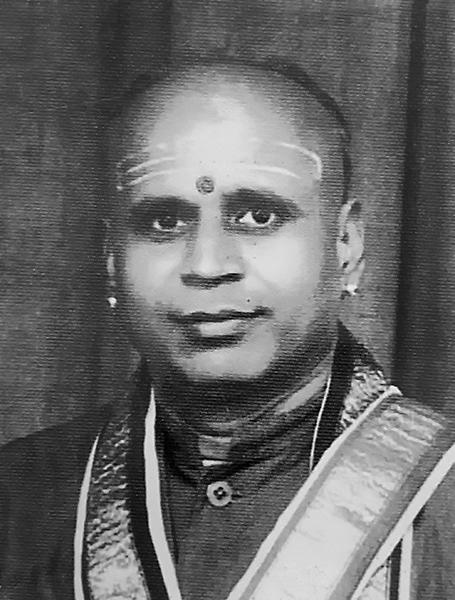

Background information
- Born: 27 November 1893; Therazhundur, Tanjore District, Madras Presidency, British India (Present-day Mayiladuthurai District, Tamil Nadu, India)
- Died: 31 December 1958 (aged 65)
- Genre: Carnatic
- Occupations: Composer, Musician and Dramatist

Mayuram Viswanatha Sastri (1893–1958) was a Carnatic music composer. His most remembered composition is the patriotic song "Jayathi Jayathi Bharata Mata". Translated "Victory Victory to Mother India", the song has become a standard among classical singers of South India. This song is one of the 18 songs in his book 'Bharat Bhajan' which was published in the year 1948 containing songs in praise of Bharat Matha (Mother India) and Mahatma Gandhi. This book was one among his many publications. See AIR's 13-episode documentary of his works.

== Early life and background ==
Sastri was born on 27 November 1893 to Ramaswamy Ganapadigal and Balambal Lakshmi in Therizhandur near Mayiladuthurai (also known as Māyavaram, present-day Mayilāduthurai) in Tamil Nadu. He was the second of six children. He was initiated in Sanskrit studies, as was the custom, and was put in Sanskrit College at Kalyan Mahal, Thiruvaiyaru. He also studied the Vedas simultaneously for some time. This helped him attain proficiency in the Vedas and the Sanskrit language. Later, the lure of English education led him to become a student at the Municipal High School in Mayuram.

He was interested in Carnatic music from an early age and trained under illustrious preceptors like Dasavadyam Venkatarama Iyengar of Devakottai, Namakkal Narasimha Iyengar and Simizhi Sundaram Iyer.

Young Sastri devoted more time to music than to his other studies. He imbibed the taste for music from his mother. He had a high-pitched voice and, in due course, he attracted the attention of the local Vidvans (Maestros) who recognized his musical talent.

== Life history ==
Completing his S.S.L.C. (Secondary School Leaving Certificate) in 1912, Sastri searched for a job and got a school teacher's post. In 1913, he married Kamalambal. He lost his parents in 1915. He shifted to Tiruchirappalli and became a teacher and musician. In the meantime, he gained proficiency in Harmonium playing and became acquainted with Alathur Venkatesa Iyer. He tried his hand at Harikatha for some time at the suggestion of Muthiah Bhagavatar and Panchapakesha Bhagavatar who were his close friends. He later moved to Karaikudi and as a music teacher. In 1921, he moved back to Madras (Now Chennai).

His only daughter survived for less than a year after birth. In 1935, he also lost his wife.

Mayuram Viswanatha Sastri died in Jamshedpur on 31 December 1958.

== Musical Journey ==
The burning desire in him that he should become a full-fledged musician made him approach Namakkal Narasimha Iyengar for a Vidya guru (teacher). He also had music training under Dasavadyam Venkatarama Iyengar of Devakottai and later under Simizhi Sundaram Iyer. He moved to Madras (now Chennai) in 1921 and became a professional musician. He was for some time the Harmonium player for dramas enacted by the Madras Secretariat Party and also gave performances on the Harmonium with accompaniments. When A.I.R. (All India Radio) issued a ban on Harmonium in 1940, he gave it up.

From an early age, Sastri had a gift for composing songs. This was mostly in Tamil and dedicated to Lord Murugan. In 1926, Kadalangudi Natesha Shastri published Sastri's first book of songs "Valli Parinaya Manipravala Satakam". The Madras Music Academy instituted a Kriti competition in all languages in 1929. A total of 9 competitors had submitted 20 songs. Out of 3 compositions in Sanskrit, 2 of Sastri's compositions were the only songs selected for the top spot. A committee of three judges - Tiger Varadachariar, T. L. Venkatarama Iyer and Jalatharangam Ramaniah Chettiar, adjudged his Sanskrit Kriti "Kamithe Karunanvite" in praise of 'Bharatha Matha' (Mother India) in Todi Raga as the best.

He was awarded a prize amount of Rs.100/-, a princely sum in those days, and was feted at a public function for musicians and music lovers. This was just the right opening for him to bring to limelight his composing ability and spurred him to compose more songs.

In 1933, Swami Balananda Sarasvati of Kadirkamam, in Sri Lanka (Ceylon in those days), highly impressed with the devotional character of his songs, helped him to publish the book "Murugan Pugazh Paamalai" which contained songs in praise of Lord Muruga. He also gave him the title of "Kantam" (indicating his songs had a magnetic ability to attract audience), the catchword of the song "Kantamam Kadirkamattanilor".

He founded the Bhakta Sangita Mandal in 1933, through which mass singing of his songs was conducted, where he taught these songs for free. As years advanced, he applied himself more to composing songs in praise of Lord Muruga and all thoughts of becoming a performing musician receded as his focus towards becoming a composer increased. In 1940, he published the book "Murugan Madhura Kirtanai" consisting of 60 songs on Lord Muruga. The book provides a rich repertoire of Tamil songs.

In 1947, a booklet of songs in Tamil for Independence Day 'Desiya Jaya Geetham' was published. It dealt with Khaddar, Gandhiji, Flag salutation, and so on. In 1948, a booklet of 18 songs in Sanskrit, called "Bharat Bhajan", containing songs on Bharata Matha (Mother India) and Mahatma Gandhi, was published. The songs are in simple flowing language, set in well-known Hindustani ragas like Behag, Bhimpalas, Bilaval. Mand and Desh to ensure they are sung all over the country [India].

There are still a good number of songs in the manuscript, both in Tamil and Sanskrit, which Sastri intended to publish such as "Shiva Shakti Madhura Kirtanai" and "Harihara Madhura Kirtanai". He has composed a set of five songs called "Balar Pancharatnam" in Sanskrit, for children that forms a prayer. The manuscript collection also includes 8 songs on Shirdi Sai Baba, which has come out as a CD in 2007.

He was the first person to set the Tirukkural verses to music and he published the first volume containing the Arattupal in 41 songs with Svara notation calling it "Tirukkural Madhura Kirtanai". This was published during his lifetime. The Sangeet Natak Academy in Delhi gave a grant of Rs.1000 for this. Later on one more volume was published by his younger brother Shri.T. R. Vaithisvaran in 1987. Other volumes of this series are still in manuscripts.

He has also written a few novels and plays of which "Bhakta Jayadeva" and "Chitra Kamini" were staged. Others included Karaikal Ammayar, Virata Parva, Santha Kumari, and Mithra Vijayam.

He was a member of the experts' committee of Annamalai University for two years.

== Other information ==
He was the second of six siblings. His elder brother was Shri. R. Krishnamoorthi. His younger brothers were Shri. R. Kuppuswami Iyer, Shri. R. Rajagopalan, Shri. T. R. Vaithisvaran. The last sibling was his sister Smt. Vallabham Kalyanasundaram.

Shri.T. R. Vaithisvaran was also a composer by his own merit and is known for his work Shri Ramarpana Gita Puja Kirtana, Shri Ramarpana Kirtana, and Shri Ramarpana Jeevia Kirtana.

His sister Smt. Vallabham Kalyanasundaram was an accomplished singer and recognized as 'Vidushi' for her depth of knowledge in Carnatic Music. She was an artist with All India Radio and Guru (teacher) to Shri. Vidwan S. Shankar.

She carried on the legacy of Sastri by winning a number of awards in Carnatic Music competitions, giving concerts and conducting music classes too. Through her, Sastri is survived by a number of her grandchildren and great-grandchildren, some of whom are also musicians like Natraj Pushpavanam and Shivaraj Natraj.

== Compositions ==
List of Publications
Sr.No	Name of Publication	Number of songs	Language	Year of Publication
1	Valli Parinaya Manipravala Satakam	100 verses	Tamil	1926
2	Murugan Pugazh Paamalai		Tamil	1933
3	Vedapuri Kirtana series 1	4	Sanskrit	1937
4	Murugan Madhura Kirtanai	60	Tamil	1940
5	Bharat Bhajan	18	Sanskrit	1948
6	Tirukkural Madhura Kirtanai	41	Tamil	1958

Unpublished Manuscripts
Sr.No	Name of Manuscript	Number of songs	Language
1	Shiva Shakti Madhura Kirtanai		Tamil
2	Harihara Madhura Kirtanai		Tamil
3	Balar Pancharatnam	5	Sanskrit
4	Songs on Shirdi Saibaba	8	Sanskrit
5	Songs on Shirdi Saibaba	9	Tamil

Sr.No	Songs	From Publication
1	Jayathi Jayathi	Bharat Bhajan
2	Karthikeyanai	Murugan Madhura Kirtanai
3	Sarasadalanayanane	Murugan Madhura Kirtanai
4	Sri Mahaganapathe	Unpublished Varnam
5	Samarasa Bhavana	Bharat Bhajan
6	Jaalame	Murugan Madhura Kirtanai
7	Shantha Ahimsa Murte	Bharat Bhajan
8	Adumayile	Murugan Madhura Kirtanai
9	Bharatha Samrajya Sukhi	Bharat Bhajan
10	Gana Nadha	Unpublished Varnam
11	Ninne Nammi	Unpublished Varnam
12	Dasarathe	Unpublished Varnam
13	Mayil Vahana	Murugan Madhura Kirtanai
14	Thaatha Vara Dwijaathamaam	Songs on Shirdi Sai Baba
