= Saw Ganesan =

Kamban Adippodi Swaminathan Ganesan (6 June 1908 – 28 July 1982) was an Indian politician and Tamil activist, writer, historian, and epigraphist. He was known for popularising the Tamil epic Ramavataram (also known as Kamba Ramayanam) through his Kamban Kazhagam organization, and for initiating construction of a temple to the Tamil language in Karaikudi.

== Early life and politics ==
Saw Ganesan was born on 6 June 1908 in Karaikudi, Chettinad to Swaminathan and Nachiyammai, a Tamil merchant family. His family ran a business in Burma. In 1927, he headed a volunteer group during the visit of Mahatma Gandhi to Karaikudi, and the same year he joined the Indian National Congress to participate in the Indian independence movement. In 1941, as part of his individual Satyagraha, he went on a padayatra to New Delhi, but he was arrested by the British government for his participation in the Satyagraha.

In 1942, the British Raj issued a "shoot on sight" order against him for his involvement in the Quit India Movement. He surrendered in Chennai after the instruction from C. Rajagopalachari (Rajaji).

== Political career ==
Ganesan contested the presidential election for the Tamil Nadu Congress Committee in 1946 but lost to K. Kamaraj.

Following a disagreement with Jawaharlal Nehru socialist policies, Rajaji formed the liberal Swatantra Party in 1959. Ganesan became one of the founding members of this party. He later he held the post of Madras state president of the party. He won the 1962 Madras State legislative assembly election from the Karaikudi constituency. He was elected to the Tamil Nadu Legislative Council in 1968.

== Contributions to the Tamil language ==
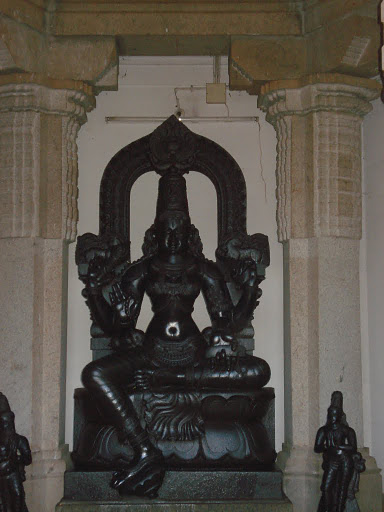
Tamil Thai Statue, Karaikudi

Ganesan was a great admirer of the Tamil language. He took as his mission the popularisation of Kamba Ramayanam, the Tamil version of Ramayana written by Tamil poet Kambar. Ganesan founded the Kamban Kazhagam academy in 1939.

In 1940, Ganesan decided to construct a temple to the Tamil language with Tamil Thai (Tamil mother) as the main deity. He commissioned sculptor Vaidyanatha Stapathi to design Tamil Thai as an idol of the goddess and to construct the temple in Karaikudi. Due to financial issues, construction did not begin for several years. The project proceeded with financial support from the Government of Tamil Nadu, and then-Chief Minister of Tamil Nadu M. Karunanidhi laid the foundation stone for the temple in 1975.

After the deaths of Ganesan and the sculptor Vaidyanatha, Vaidyanatha's son V. Ganapati Sthapati shouldered the responsibility of completing the temple. The Tamil Thai temple was opened by M. Karunanidhi in 1993.

Ganesan delivered a speech on the history of the Tamil language in the second World Tamil Conference in Chennai. Furthermore, he submitted several research papers on Tamil-Brahmi inscriptions. He authored many books, including Pillaiyarpatti Thala Varalaru, a historical book about the Karpaka Vinayakar Temple.

In 1980, Justice S. Maharajan honoured Ganesan with the title Kamban Adippodi, which means a devotee of Kamban.

Ganesan died on 28 July 1982.
