= Kampan =

Kampan may refers to,

- Campanian
- Kampan (Tamil poet)
