= Tamil Thai =

Personification of the Tamil language

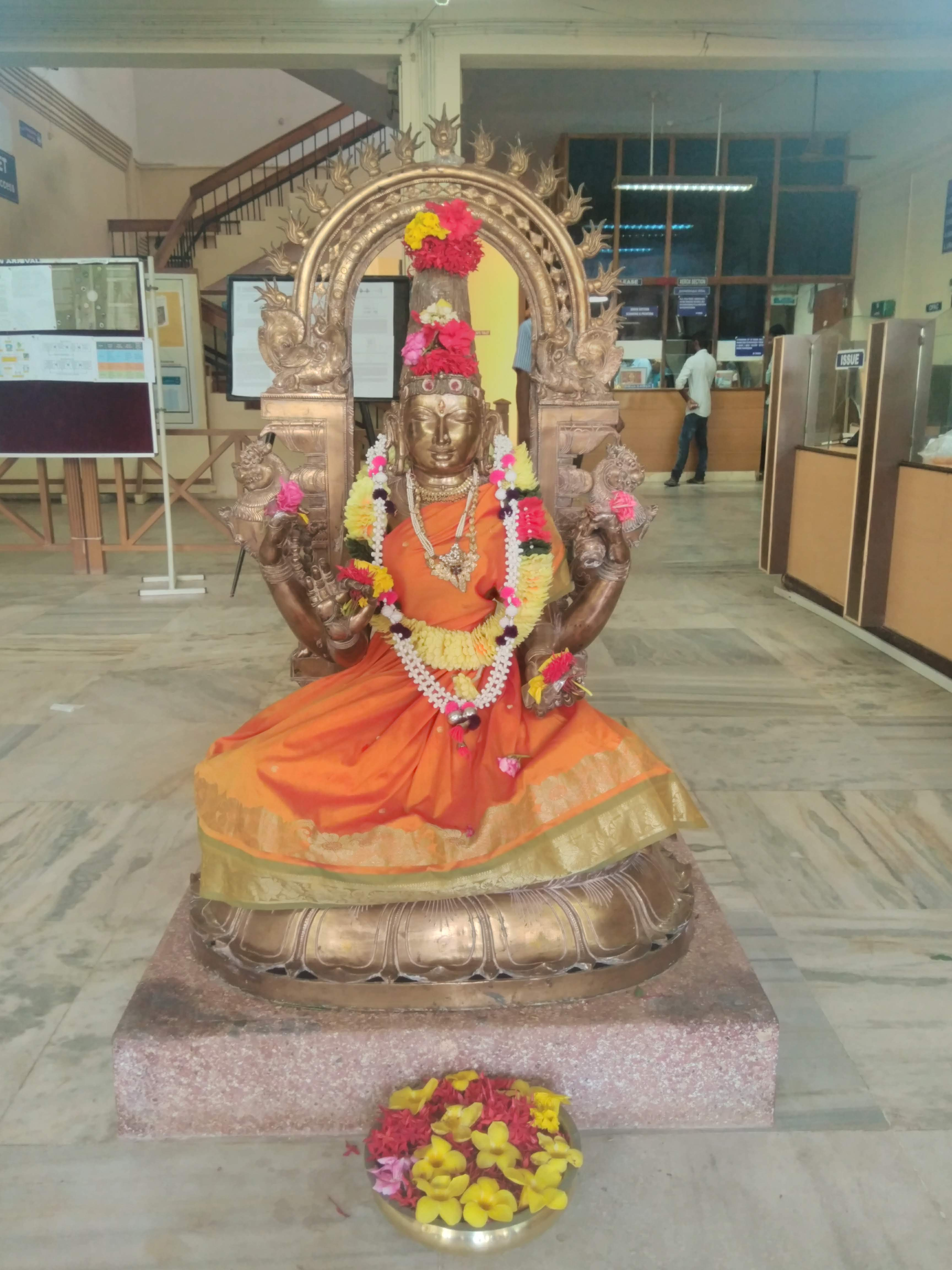
Tamil Thai statue

Tamil Thai (Tamil: Tamiḻttāy, lit. 'Tamil Mother'; Tamil pronunciation: [t̪ʌmɪ˞ɻt̪ːɑːɪ̯]) refers to the allegorical and anthropomorphic personification of the Tamil language as a mother. This persona became prominent during the Tamil Renaissance movement in the latter half of the nineteenth century.

== Concept and development ==
The concept of anthropomorphic personification of the Tamil language as a mother (Thai) became prominent during the Tamil Renaissance movement in the latter half of the 19th century. In 1879, Samuel Vedanayagam Pillai alluded to Tamil mother as a personification of the Tamil language. In 1887, in a foreword to one of his writings, C. W. Thamotharampillai mentioned the language as Tamil mother. The concept of Tamil Thai became popular after a song invoking and praising the Tamil mother in a play titled, "Manonmaniyam", written by Manonmaniam Sundaram Pillai in 1891. The Tamil Thai Valthu, based on the song, was adopted as the state song of the state by the Government of Tamil Nadu. Later, advocates of the Tanittamil Iyakkam such as Maraimalai Adigal, M. S. Purnalingam Pillai, and Parithimar Kalaignar made references to the language as Tamil Thai in their writings. The term was sometimes used to represent the Tamil culture and to instill a sense of responsibility to the Tamils to protect their culture. In the 20th century, reference to Tamil Thai became more prominent in Tamil literature.

== Depiction and iconography ==
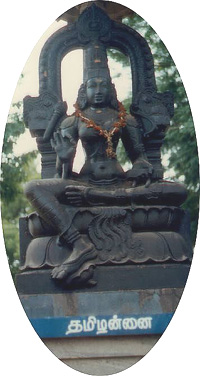
Tamil Thai statue in Madurai

Tamil Thai has been depicted variously in different art forms. She is often cast as a compassionate, respectable, and nourishing figure. She is described as having a fertile womb that gave birth to the Tamils, and even all Dravidian people (as alluded by Sundaram Pillai). Her milk (pal) is described as the one which imparts knowledge. The depiction of Tamil Thai has been influenced by the Hindu goddess Saraswati, and adopted some of her aspects, most significantly, her veena. Sometimes, Tamil Thai is herself represented as Kalaimakal, the name used to refer to Saraswati, and takes over as the guardian of education and knowledge, in part due to the Dravidian antagonism towards Sanskrit literature. However, Tamil Thai was portrayed in anger, in tears, and in a distressed state often during the Anti-Hindi agitations of Tamil Nadu.

Scholars such as Patricia Uberoi and Sumathi Ramaswamy argue that Tamil Thai represents a patriarchal construction that objectifies womanhood and turns language into a symbolic female figure shaped by male imagination. There is no single definitive image of Tamil Thai, statues of Tamil Thai have been imagined and sculpted in several different forms. S. Ganesan, the founder of Kamban Kazhagam, commissioned a panchaloha idol of Tamil Thai in 1940. She is seen seated on a globe, holding palm leaf manuscripts, a japamala, a torch of knowledge and a sengottu yazh in her hands. In 1981, the Tamil Nadu government unveiled a statue of Tamil Thai on the occasion of the fifth World Tamil Conference in Madurai, though the image drew criticism from Dravidian atheists who saw it as irrational.

There is a temple dedicated to Tamil Thai in Karaikudi in Sivaganga district in Tamil Nadu, which opened in 1993. On 14 May 2013, the state government announced the construction of a new 300 ft (91 m) high statue of Tamil Thai at Madurai.

== See also ==
- Bangamata – Personification of Bengal
- Bharat Mata – National personification of India
- Sri Lanka Matha – National anthem of Sri Lanka
- Telugu Thalli – Female personification of the Telugu people
- Telangana Thalli – Statue representing the people of Telangana
