= Kambarmedu, Mayiladuthurai =

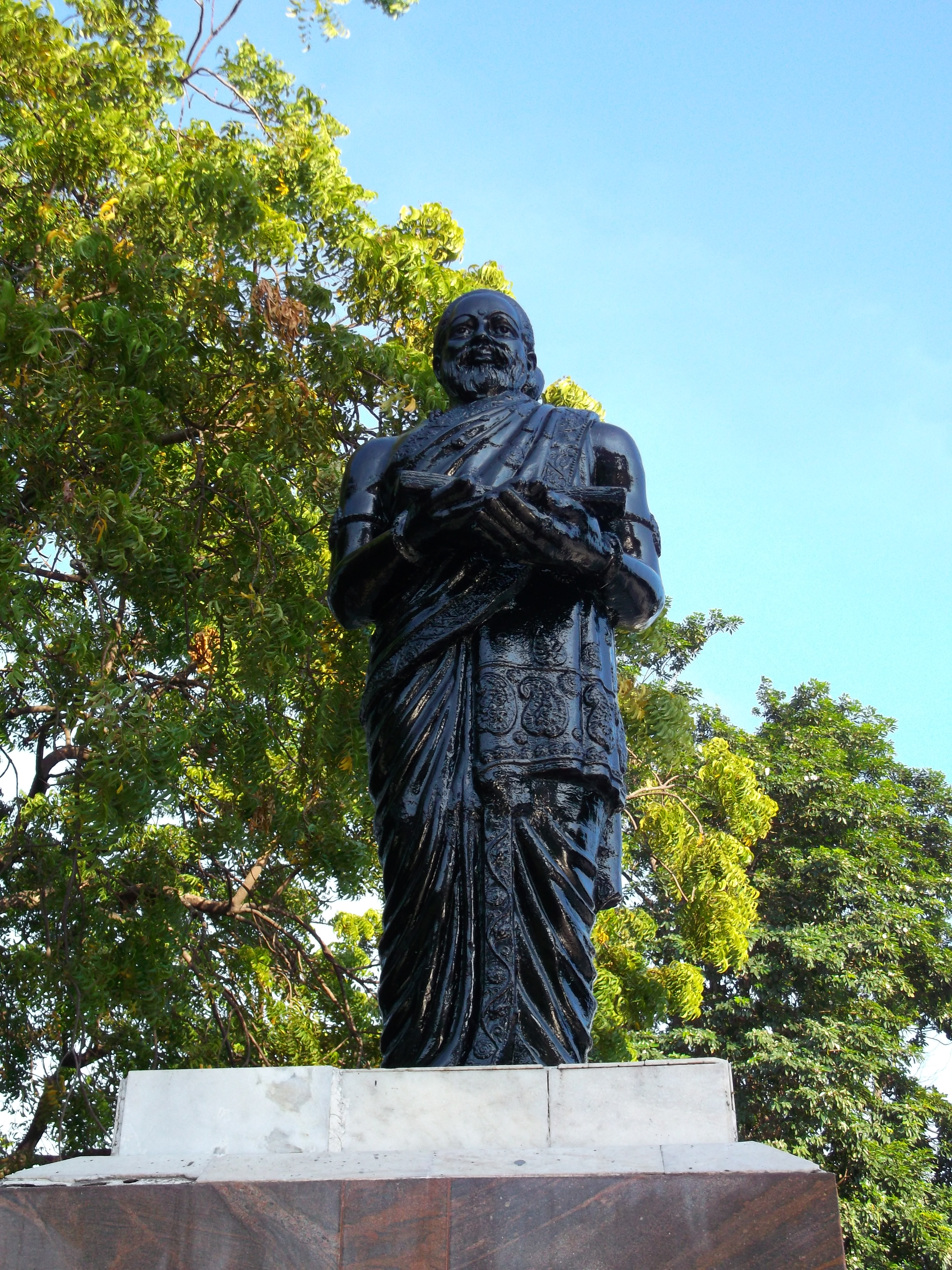
- Kambar statue at Marina Beach, Chennai

- Location within Tamil Nadu Location within India
- 11.0507684°N 79.5811199°E
- Type: Settlement
- Cultures: Medieval period
- Location: Therizhandur, Tamil Nadu, India
- Region: Mayiladuthurai

History
- Built: 12th century CE

Site notes
- Excavation dates: 1983 - 1984
- Archaeologists: P. Narayana Babu
- Management: Archaeological Survey of India, Tamil Nadu Archaeology Department
- Public access: No

Kambarmedu or Kambar Medu (Tamil: [kambarmeːɖu], ISO: Kambarimēṭu), is an archaeological site associated with the settlement of the Tamil poet Kambar. Excavations at the site were carried out by the Archaeological Survey of India (ASI) and the Tamil Nadu State Department of Archaeology. The site is located near Therizhandur village in the present-day Mayiladuthurai district (formerly part of Thanjavur district).

== Location ==
Kambarmedu is located in Therizhandur village, about 15 km from the district headquarters of Mayiladuthurai and around 27 km from Kumbakonam. The site is accessible by road, with Kuthalam railway station located approximately 7 km away. The nearest major urban centre is Mayiladuthurai. The archaeological site is currently under the control of the Archaeological Survey of India (ASI).

== Etymology ==
Kambar was a medieval Tamil poet who lived during the Chola period, generally dated to the 12th century CE. He is credited with composing the Kamba Ramayanam, a Tamil rendition of the Ramayana, which he is believed to have presented to scholars at Srirangam. The Kamba Ramayanam is widely regarded in Tamil literature for its poetic structure and narrative style, and several scholars have noted its lyrical qualities and emotional depth. Kambar also authored other literary works in Tamil, such as Tirukkai Valakkam, Erelupatu, Silai Elupatu, Kangai Puranam, Sadagopar Antati and Saraswati Antati.

The name Kambarmedu (lit. 'Kambar mound') is traditionally associated with the Tamil poet Kambar. According to local oral tradition, Kambar had the practice of breaking and discarding the clay vessels used for cooking each day, and the accumulation of these fragments eventually formed a mound, which came to be referred to as “Kambar Medu”. This explanation remains part of local folklore and is not supported by archaeological evidence.

== Background and status of study ==
Excavations at Kambarmedu, Therizhandur village, were conducted by the Southern Circle of the Archaeological Survey of India (ASI) in 1983–84. The investigations revealed that the site was primarily occupied during the early Megalithic period, with some evidence of late Neolithic elements, followed by late Megalithic and early medieval phases. Early medieval remains were disturbed but included traces of brick walls, pits, pottery (mainly dull red ware), terracotta objects, and various small antiquities such as beads, ornaments, bangles, coins, and figurines. The Megalithic levels yielded black-and-red ware, painted wares, handmade grey ware, and a Neolithic celt, while the late Megalithic phase produced thin-section black-and-red pottery, some with graffiti marks. Despite local associations, the excavations did not provide any evidence directly linking the site to the Tamil poet Kambar at the time of the investigation. ASI is expected to conduct further investigations in the area to assess claims regarding the birthplace of Kambar.

On 3 April 2025, the Governor of Tamil Nadu, along with representatives from the ASI and the Ministry of Culture, attended the Kamba Ramayanam festival at Kambarmedu. The week-long celebrations were proposed to include events at the Kambarmedu archaeological site, with activities aimed at engaging school and college students. The program included cultural events and interactive sessions intended to promote awareness of the Kamba Ramayana tradition in Tamil Nadu.

On 06 Apr 2025, during the Kamba Ramayanam festival at Kambarmedu, foundation stone was laid for an open-air museum and augmented reality facility at the archological site.

== Gallery ==
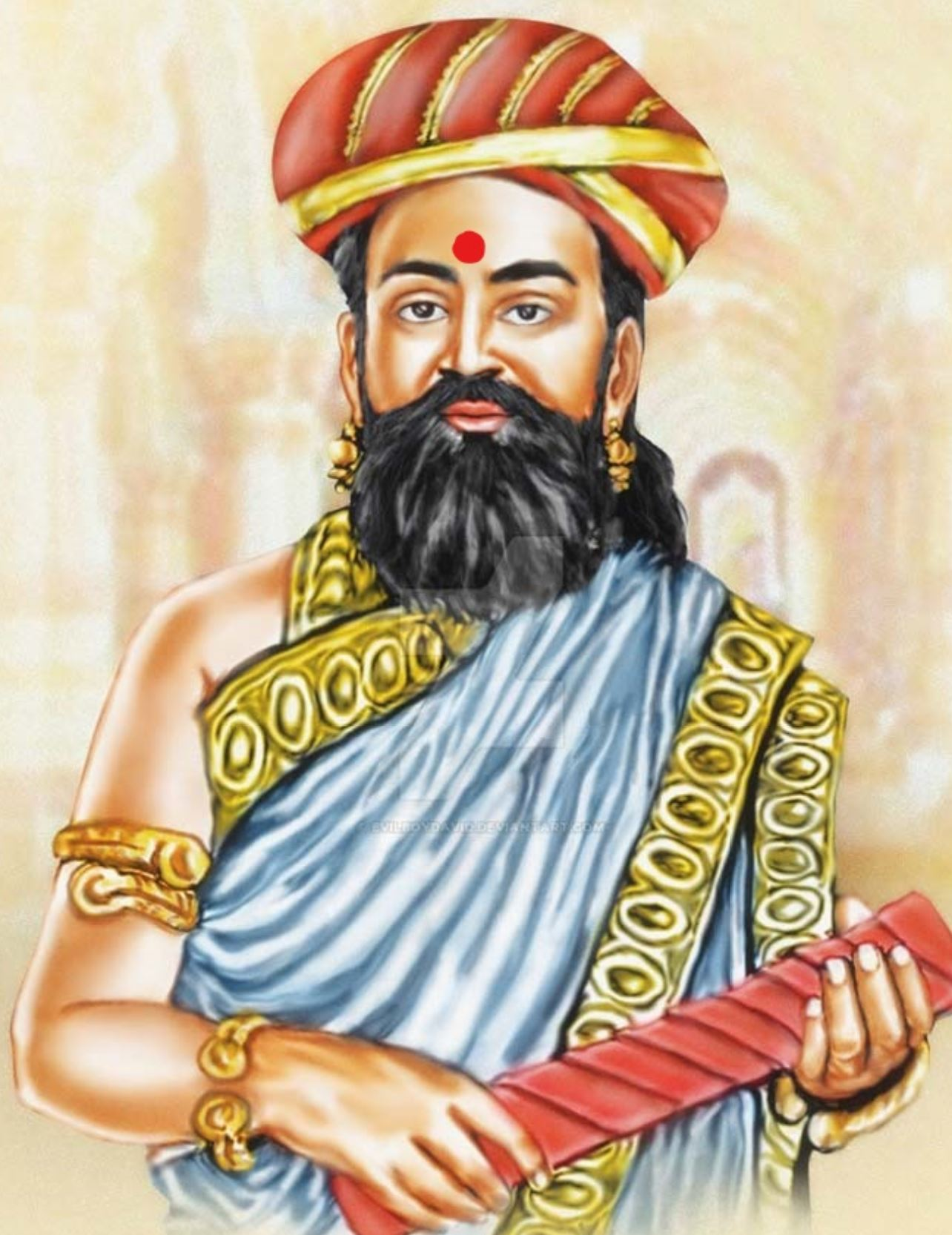
Kambar

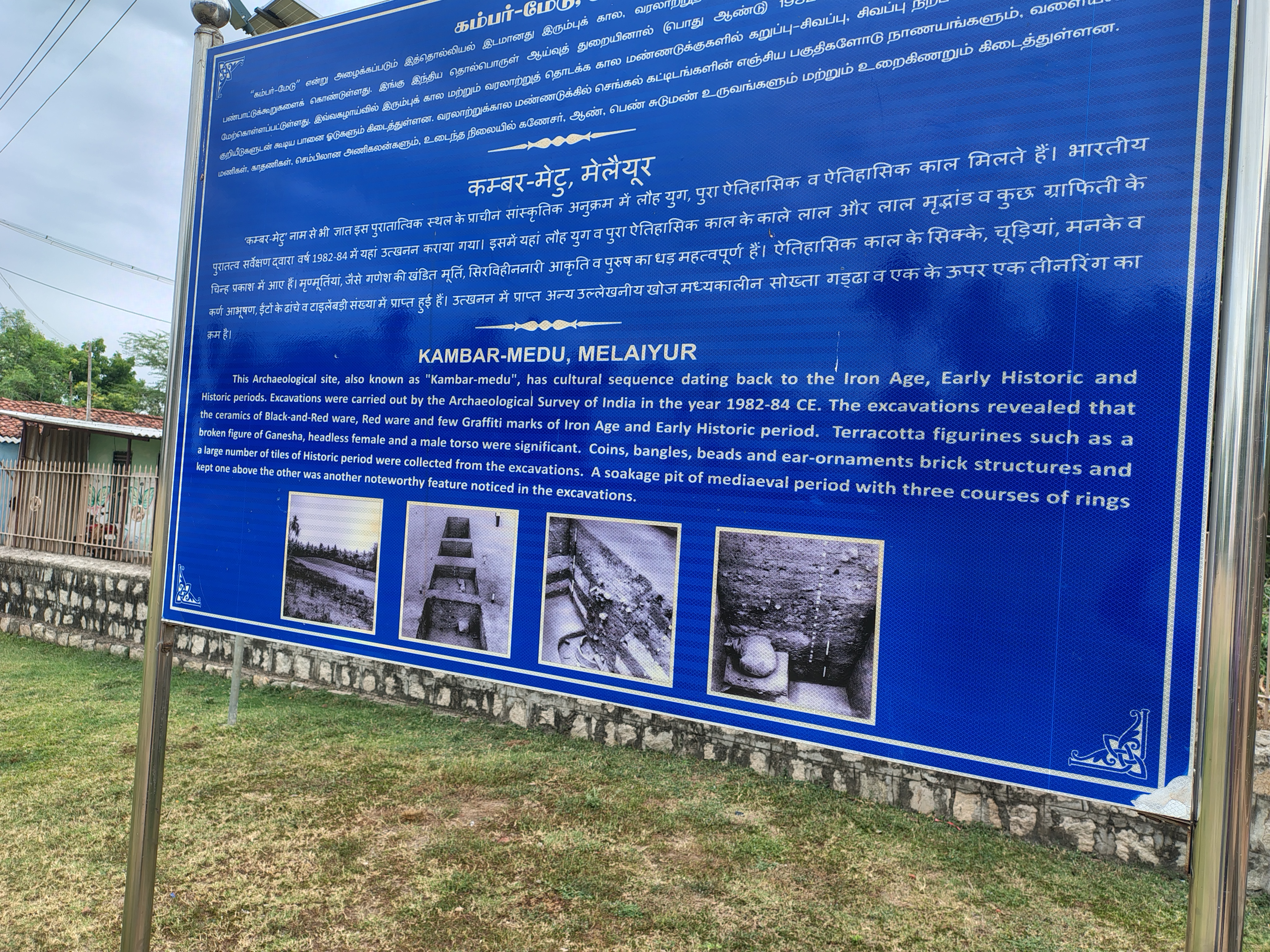
Sign board

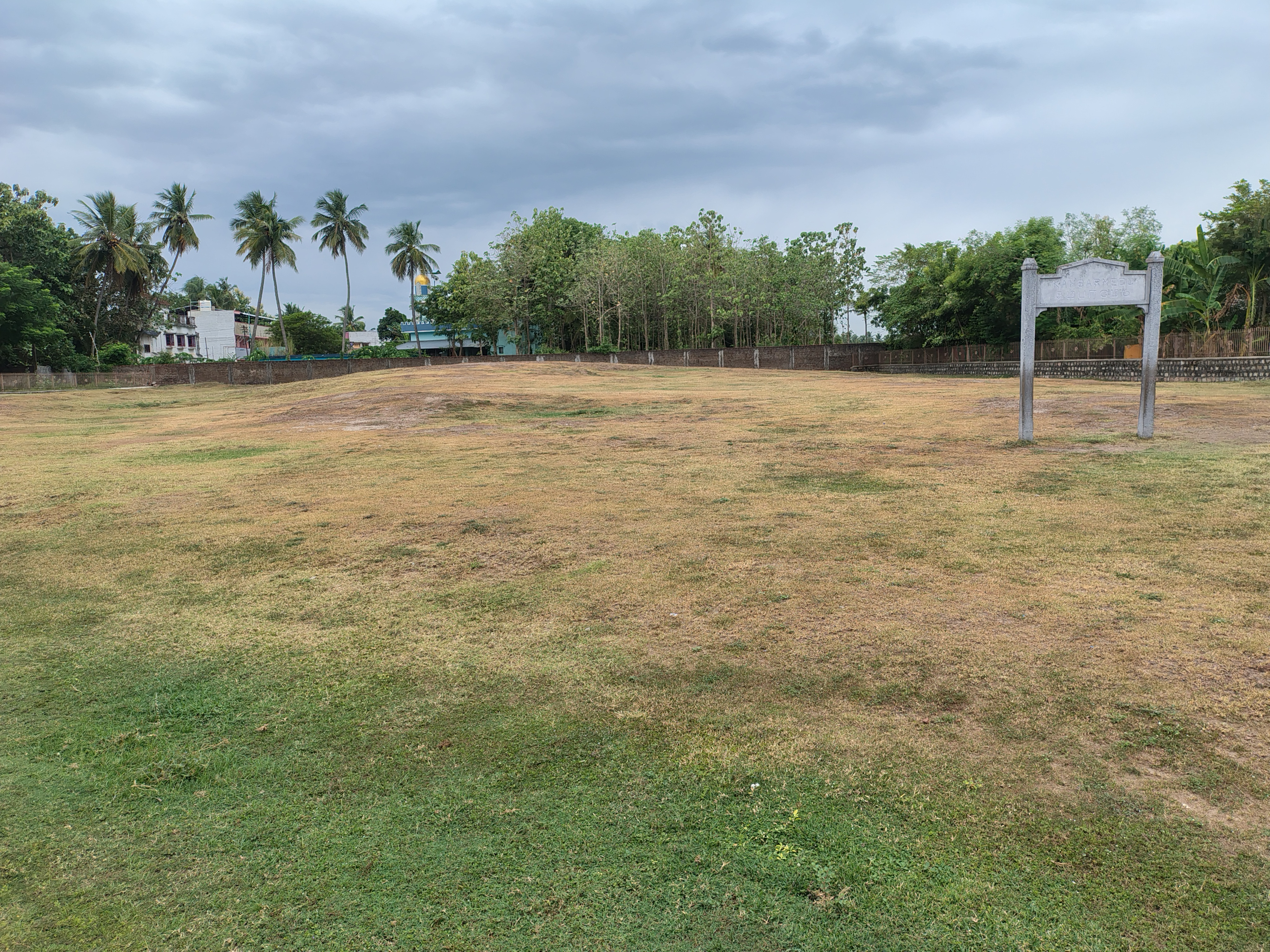
Settlement

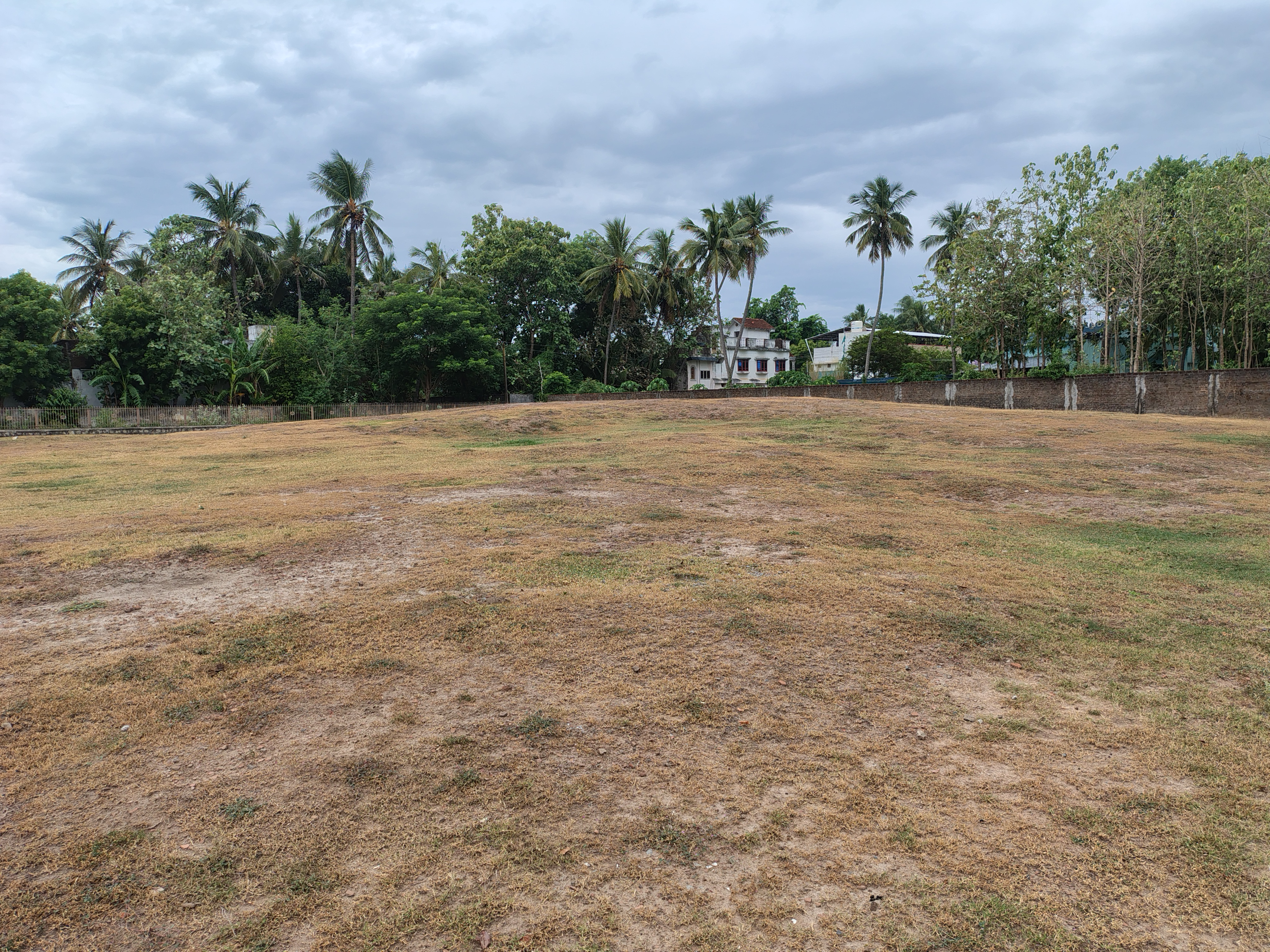
Settlement

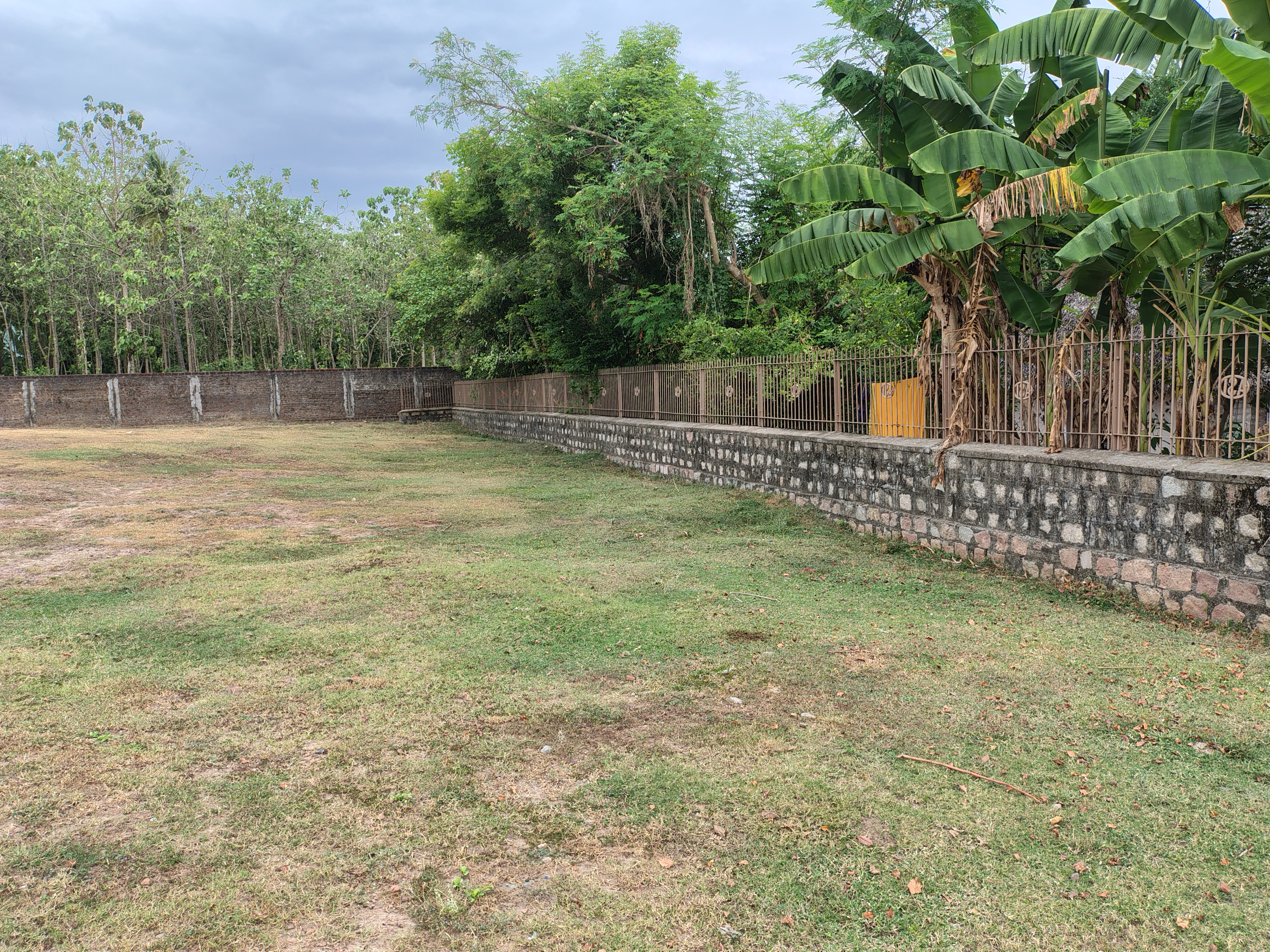
Settlement

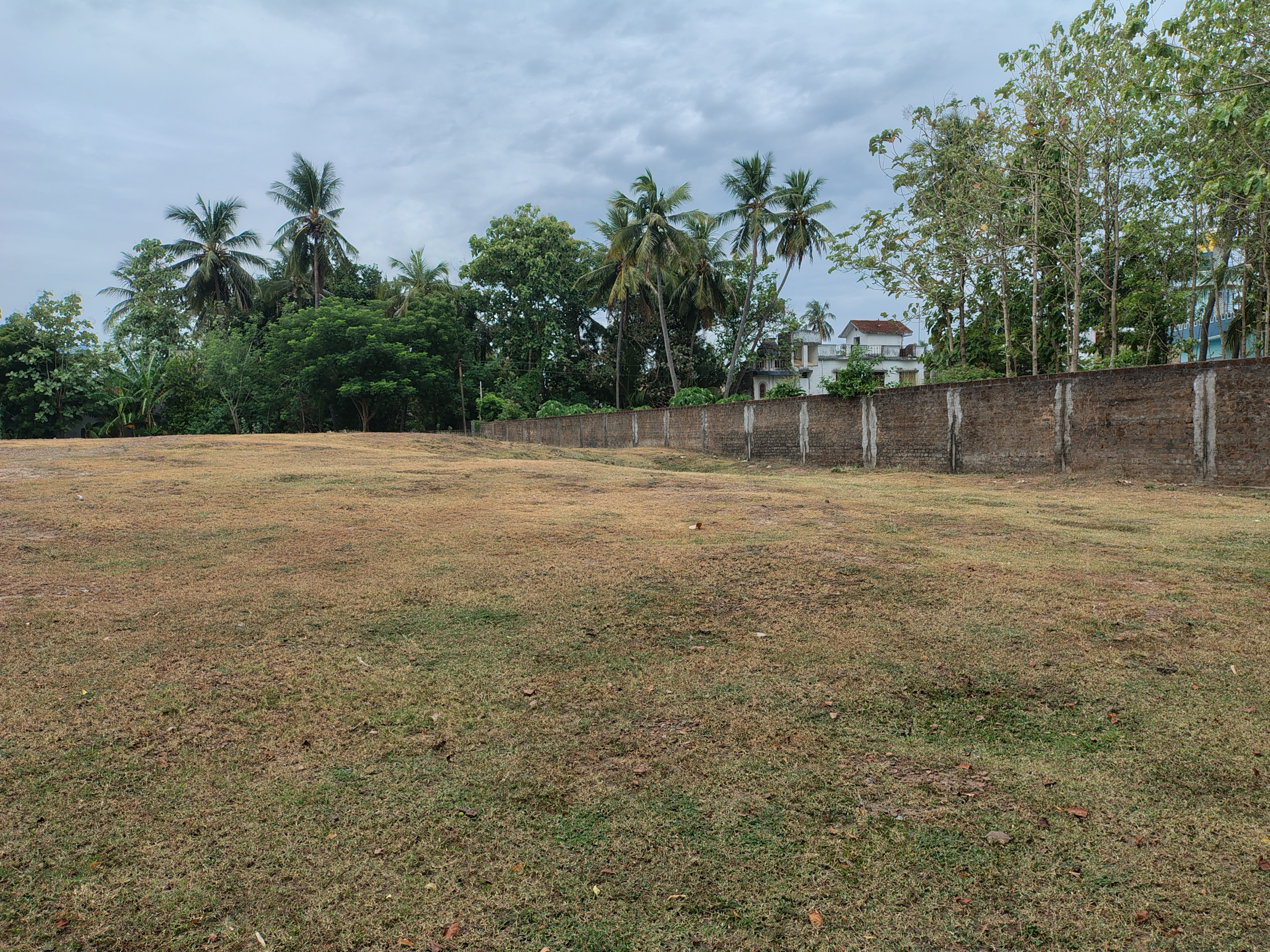
Settlement

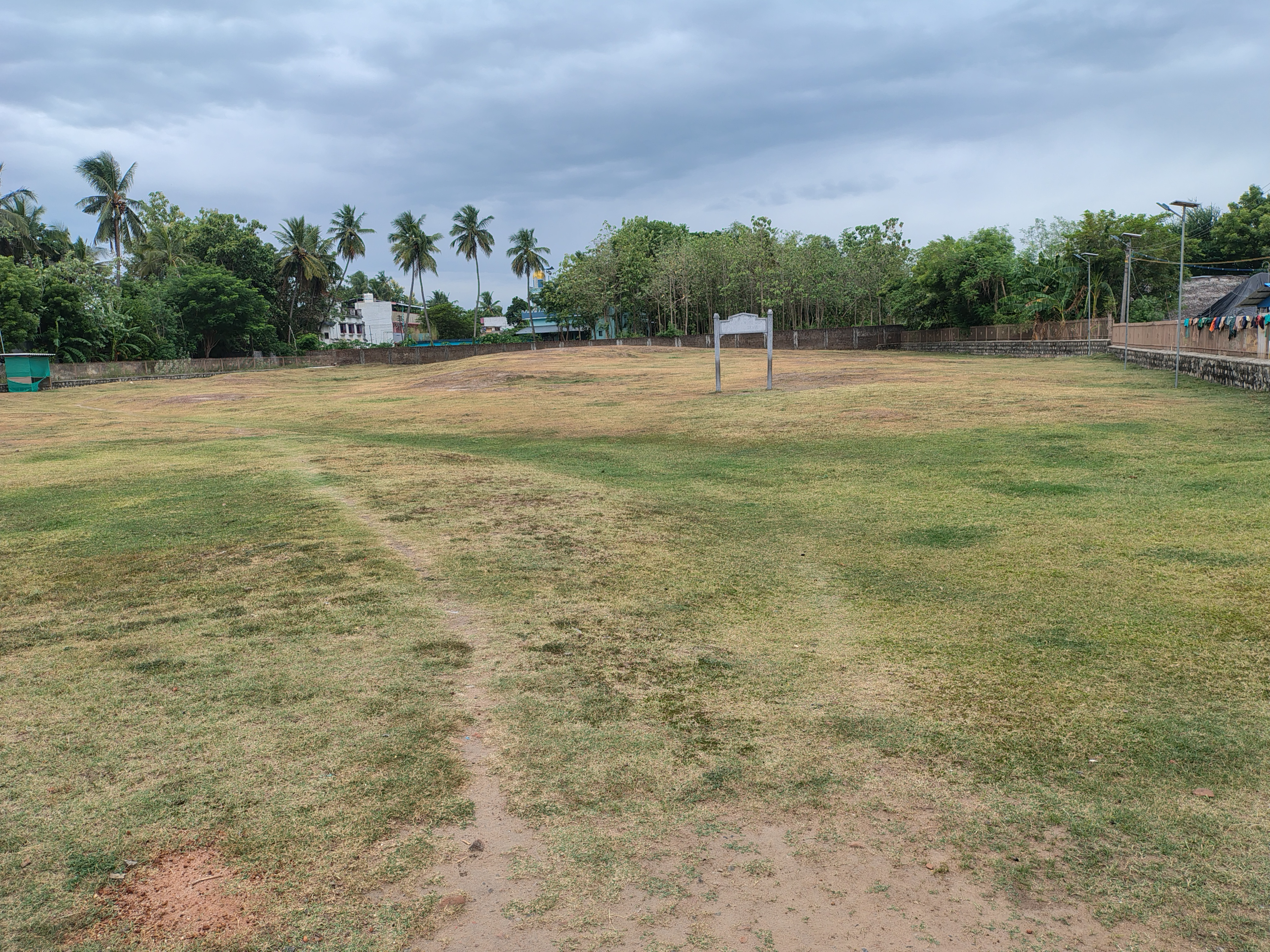
Settlement

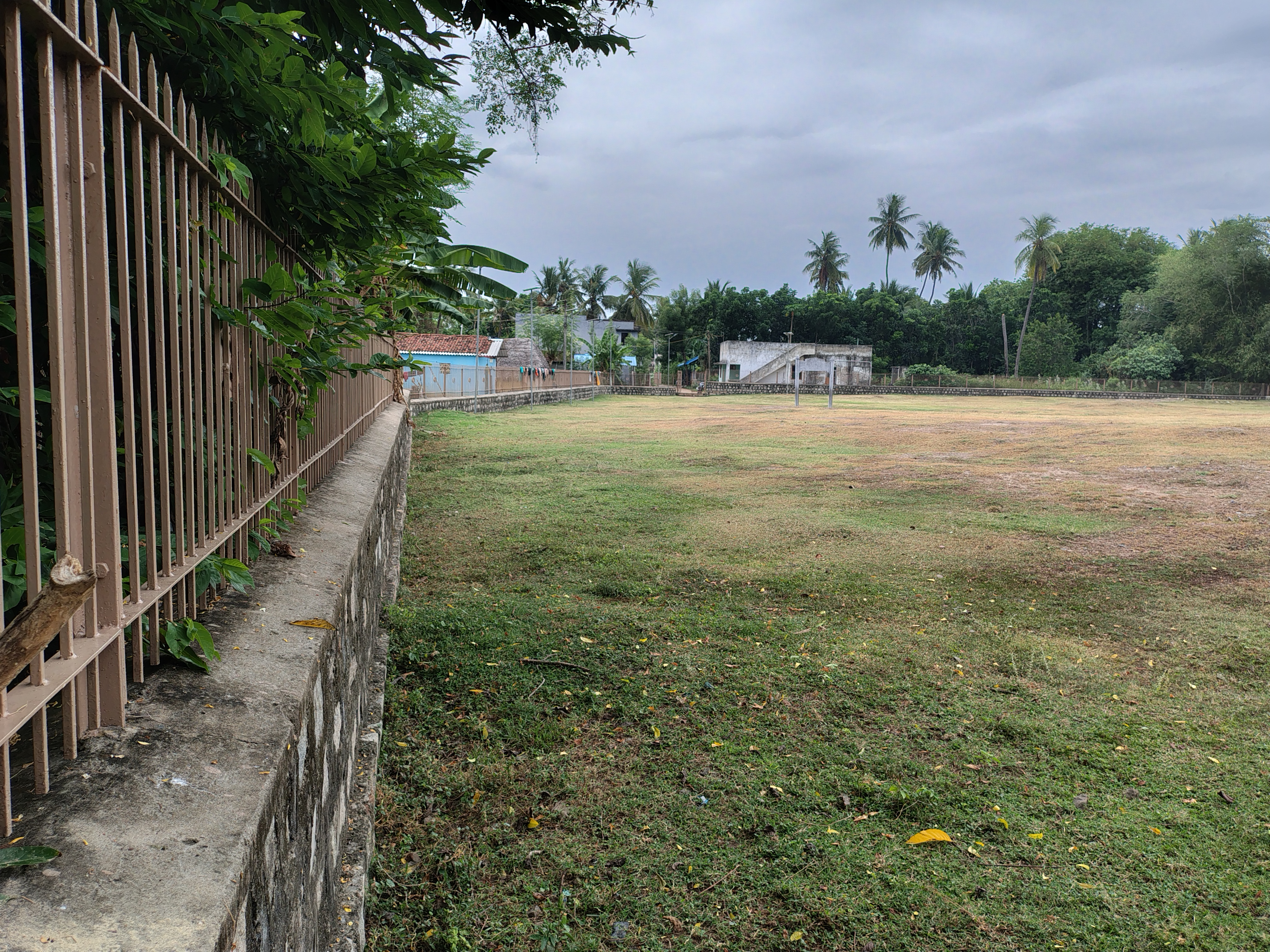
Settlement

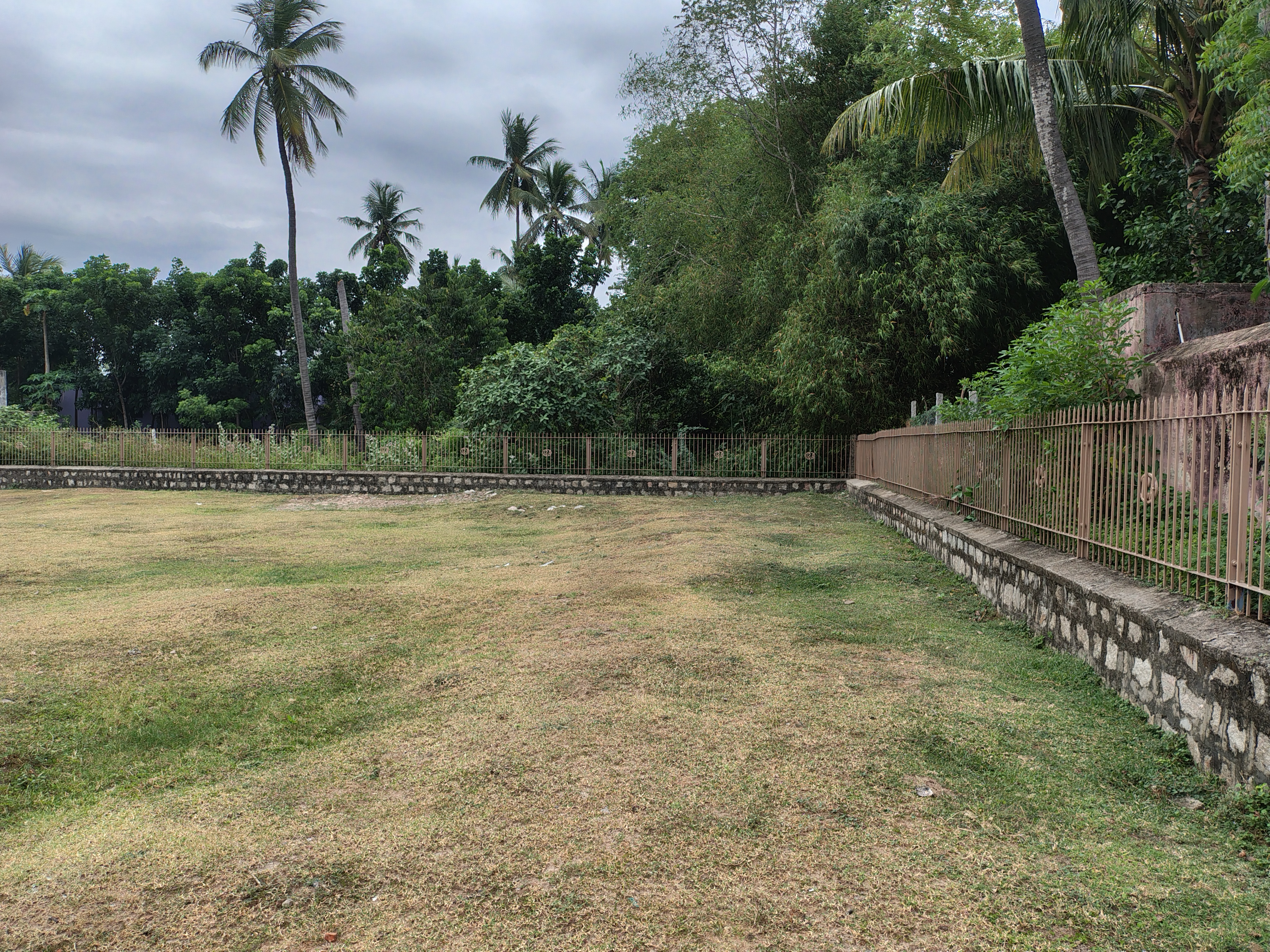
Settlement

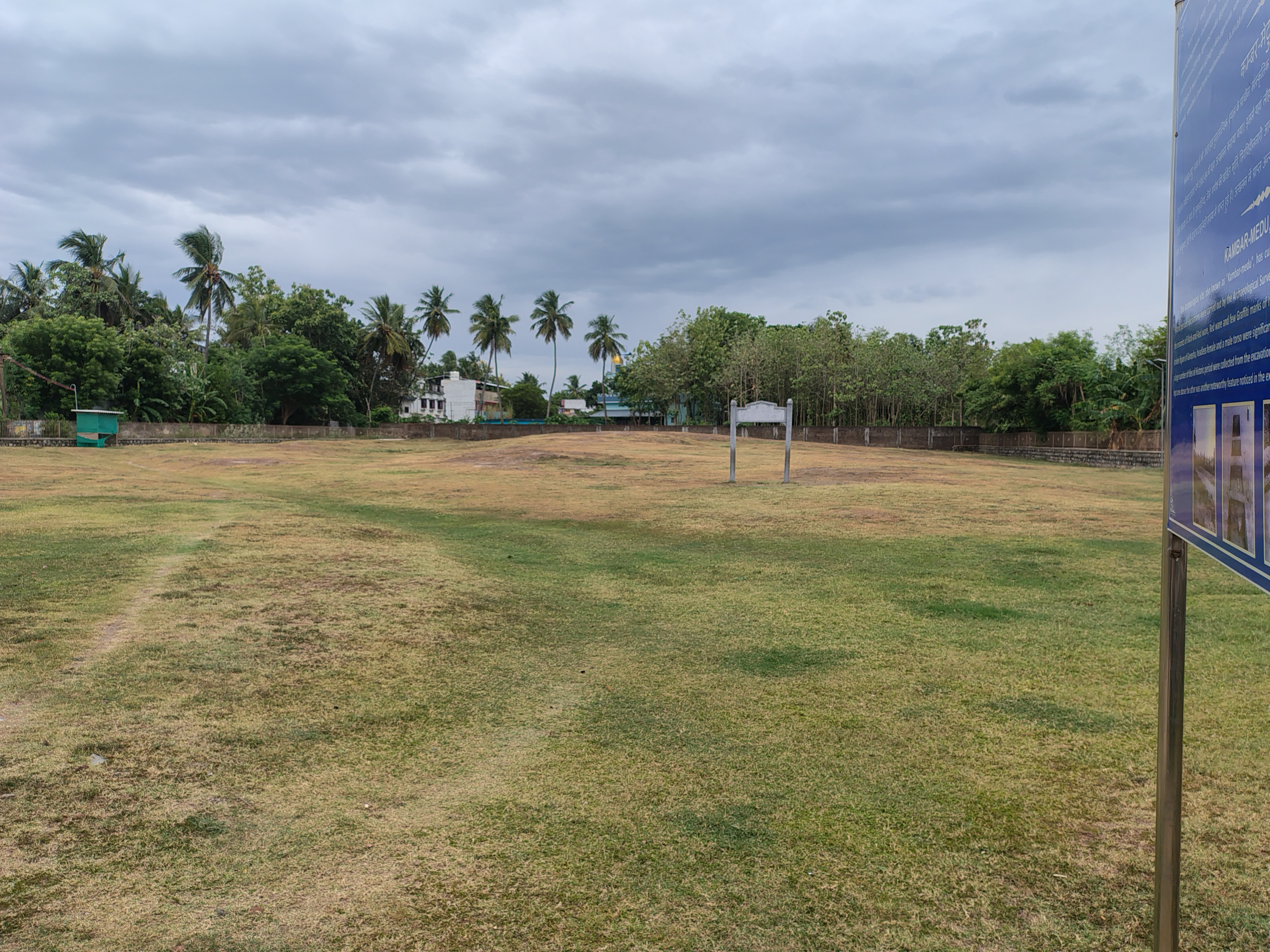
Settlement

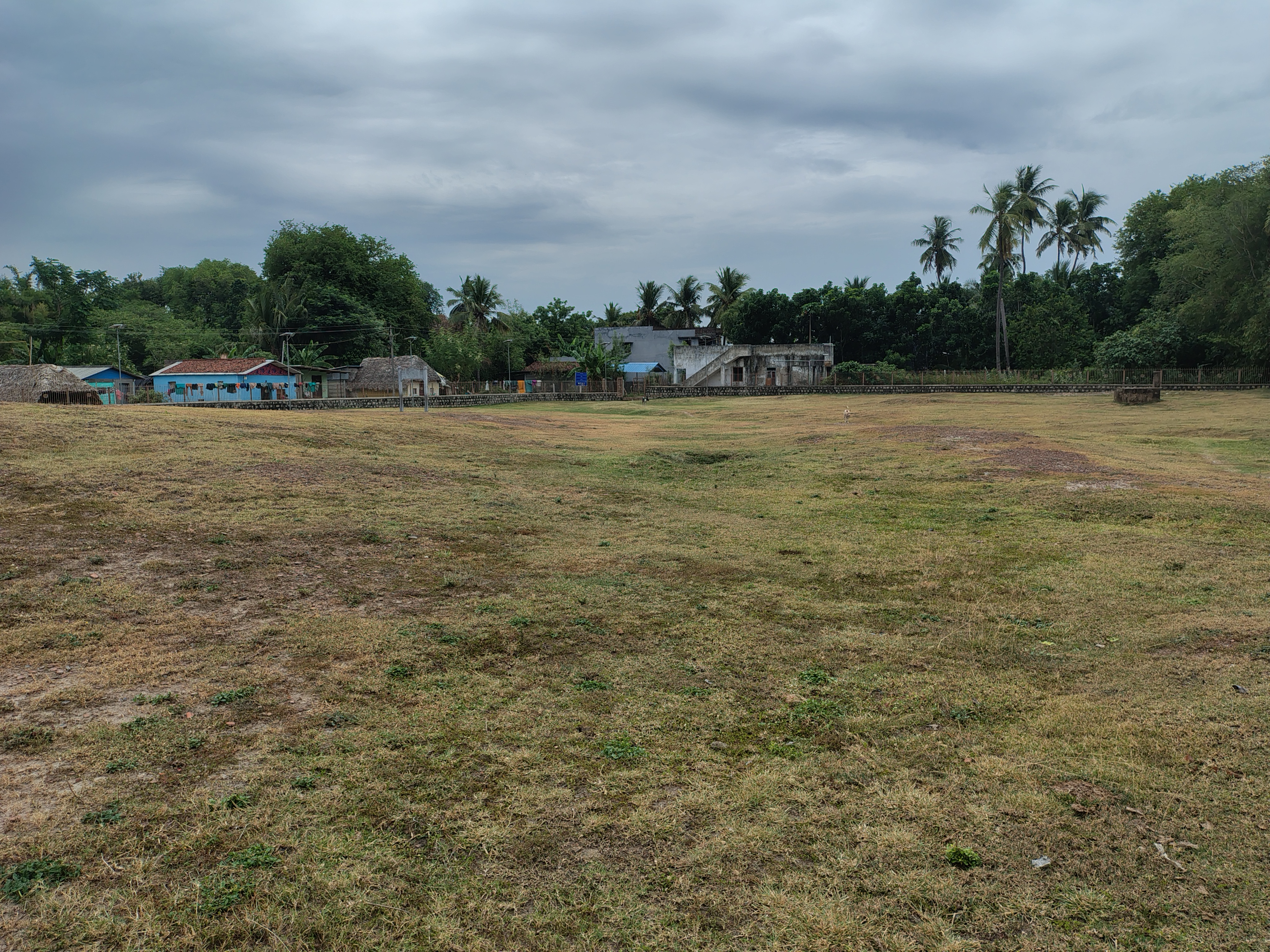
Settlement

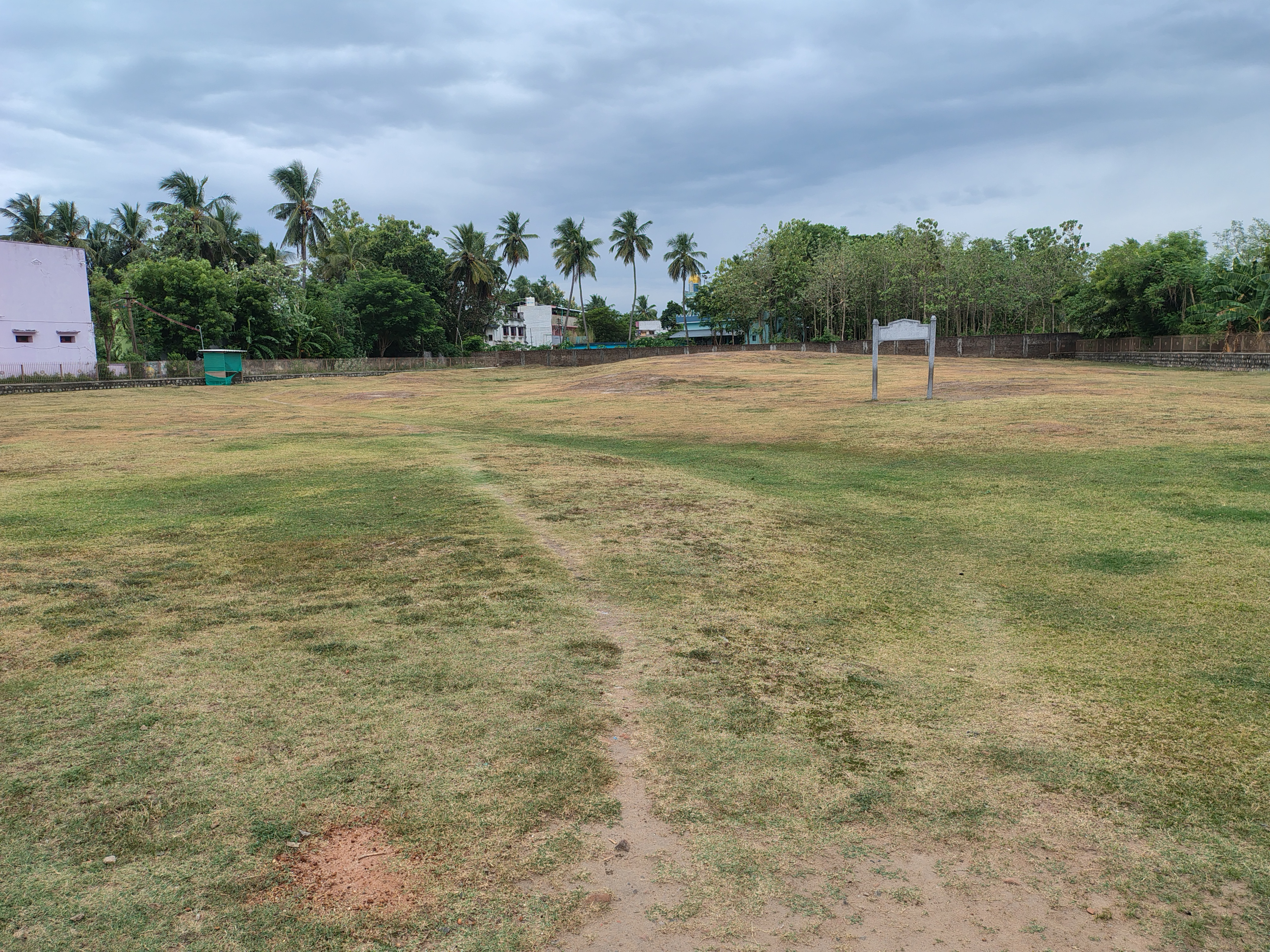
Settlement

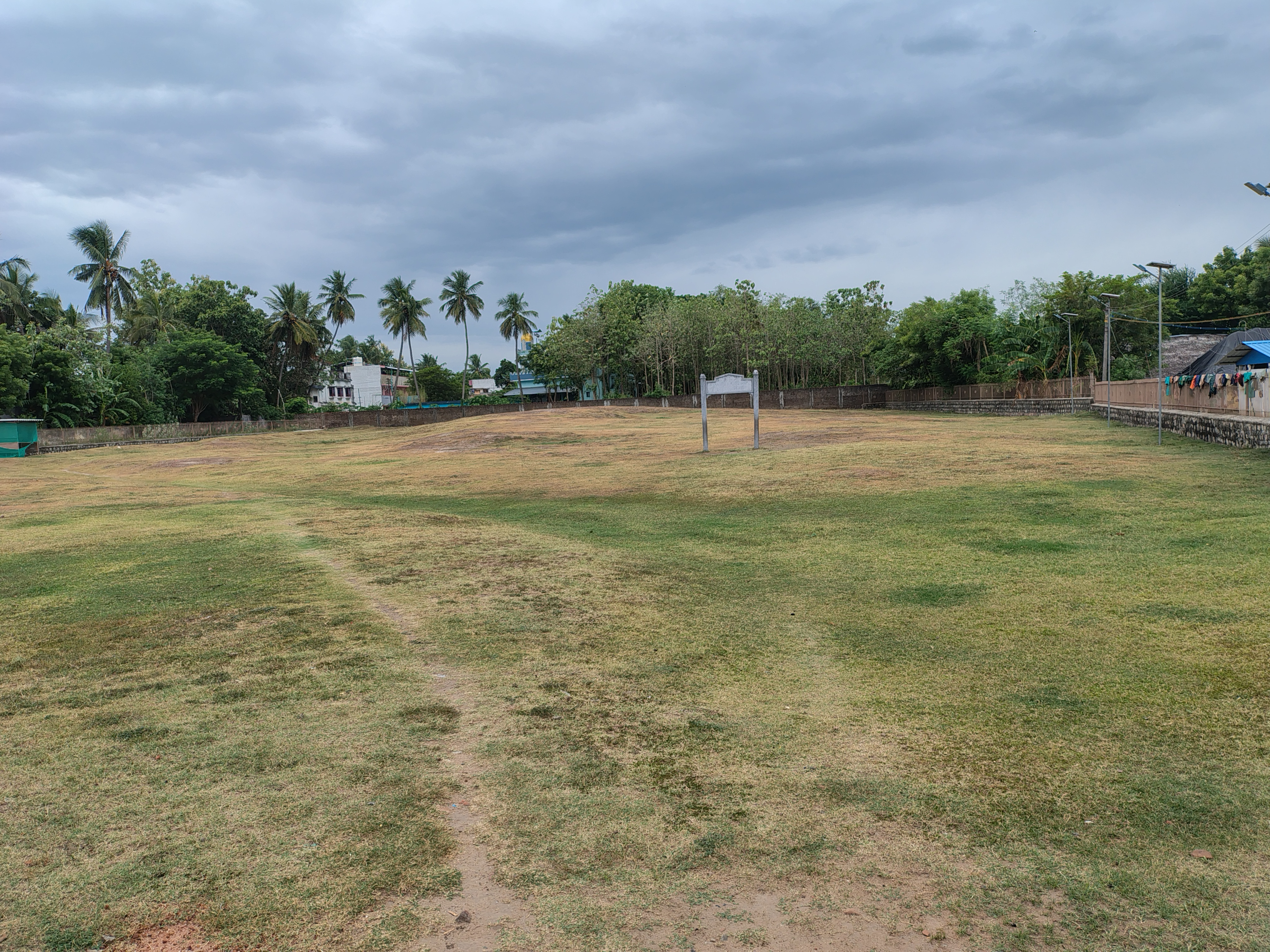
Settlement

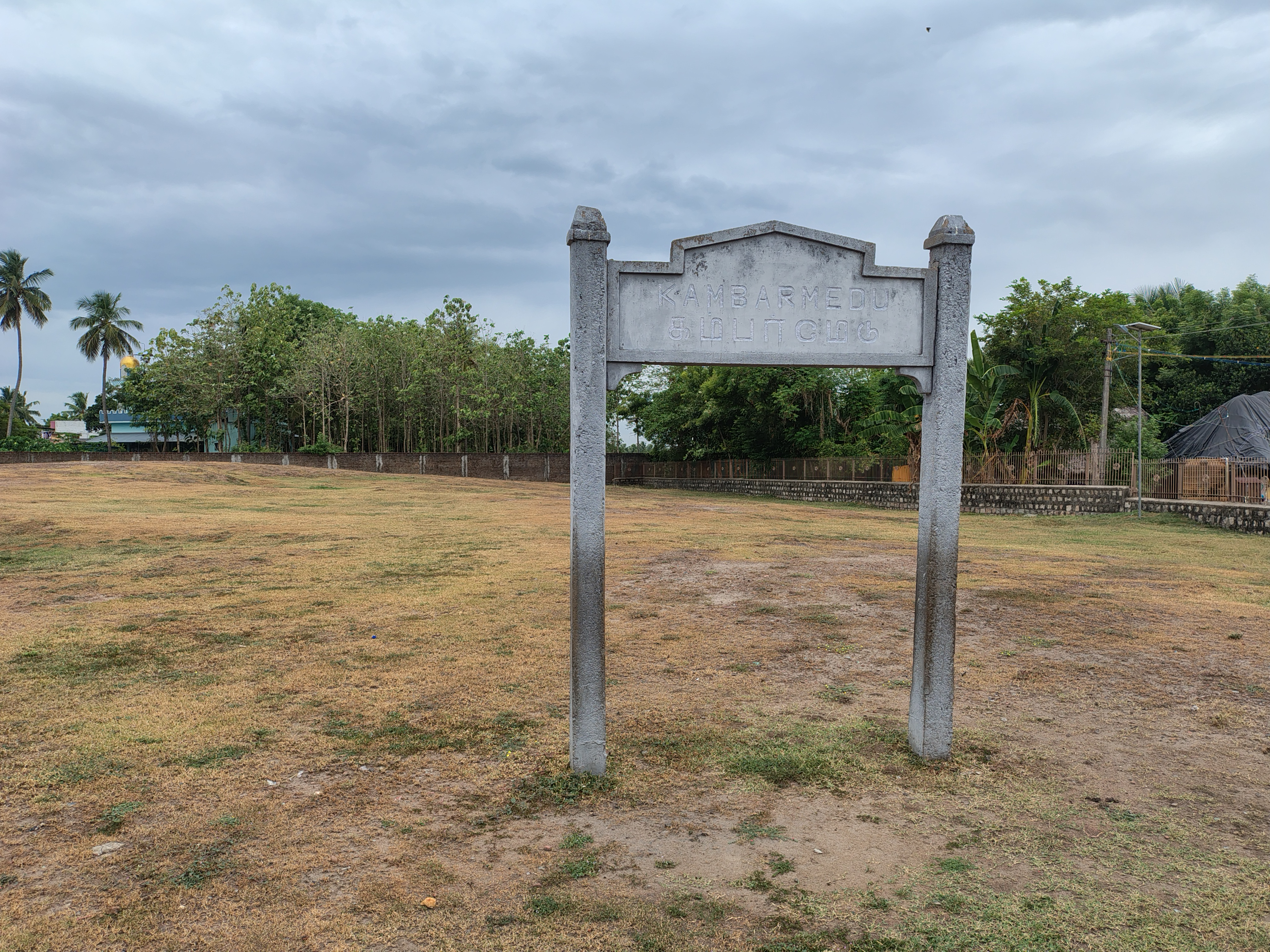
Settlement

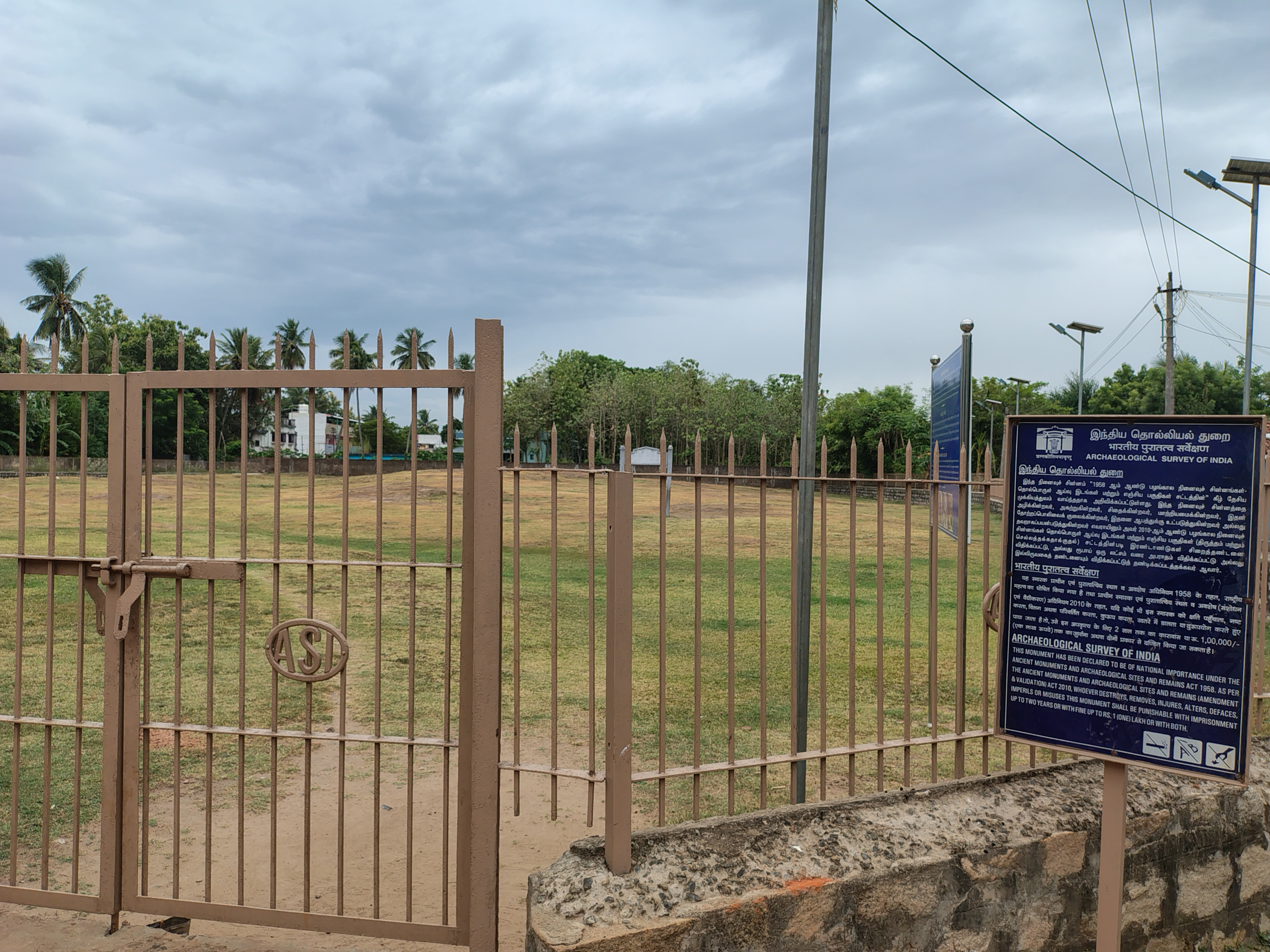
Settlement
