= Devaadi Raja Perumal temple =

Perumal temple in Mayiladuthurai district, Tamil Nadu, India

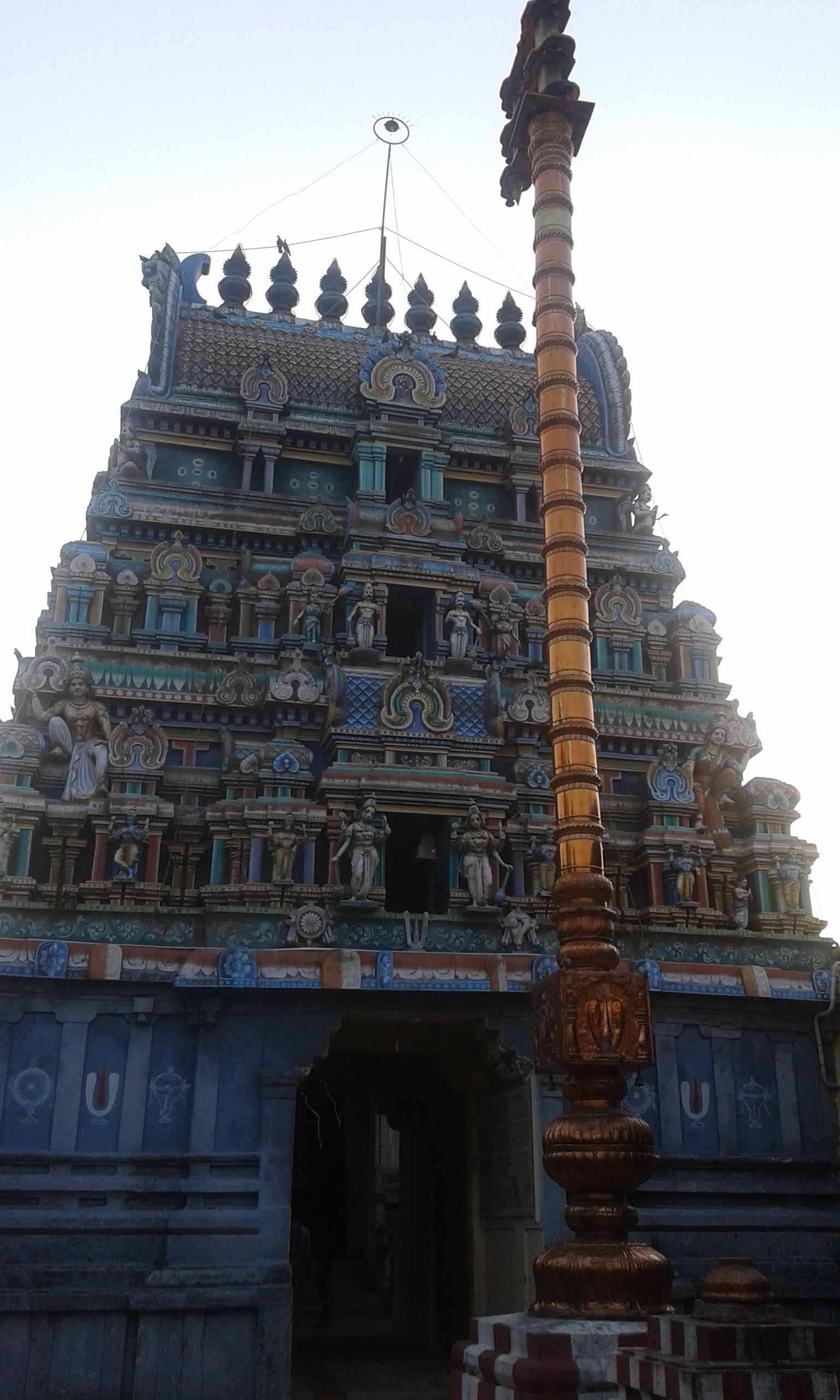

- Location in Tamil Nadu

Religion
- Affiliation: Hinduism
- District: Mayiladuthurai
- Deity: Devaadi Raja Perumal (Vishnu) Sengamalavalli (Lakshmi), Amaruviappan

Location
- Location: Therazhundur
- State: Tamil Nadu
- Country: India
- Coordinates: 11°02′47″N 79°34′46″E

Architecture
- Type: Dravidian architecture

The Devaadi Raja Perumal temple (Tamil: தேவாதிராஜன் பெருமாள் கோயில்) (also called Amaruviappan temple) in Therazhundur, a village in Mayiladuthurai district of the South Indian state of Tamil Nadu, is dedicated to the Hindu god Vishnu. Constructed in the Dravidian style of architecture, the temple is glorified in the Naalayira Divya Prabandham, the early medieval Tamil canon of the Alvar saints from the 6th–9th centuries CE. It is one of the 108 Divya Desams dedicated to Vishnu, who is worshipped as Amaruviappan, and his consort Lakshmi as Sengamalavalli Thayar. The original structure of the temple was built by the Karikala Chola during the 1st century CE, with later additions from the Cholas during the 11th century.

A granite wall surrounds the temple, enclosing all its shrines. The temple tank is located opposite to the temple, outside the main entrance. The temple follows Vadakalai tradition of worship. Six daily rituals and many yearly festivals are held at the temple, of which the Vaikasi Brahmotsavam during the Tamil of Vaikasi (during May - June), and Vaikuntha Ekadashi during Margali (December - January) being the most prominent. The temple is maintained and administered by the Hindu Religious and Endowment Board of the Government of Tamil Nadu.

== Legend ==
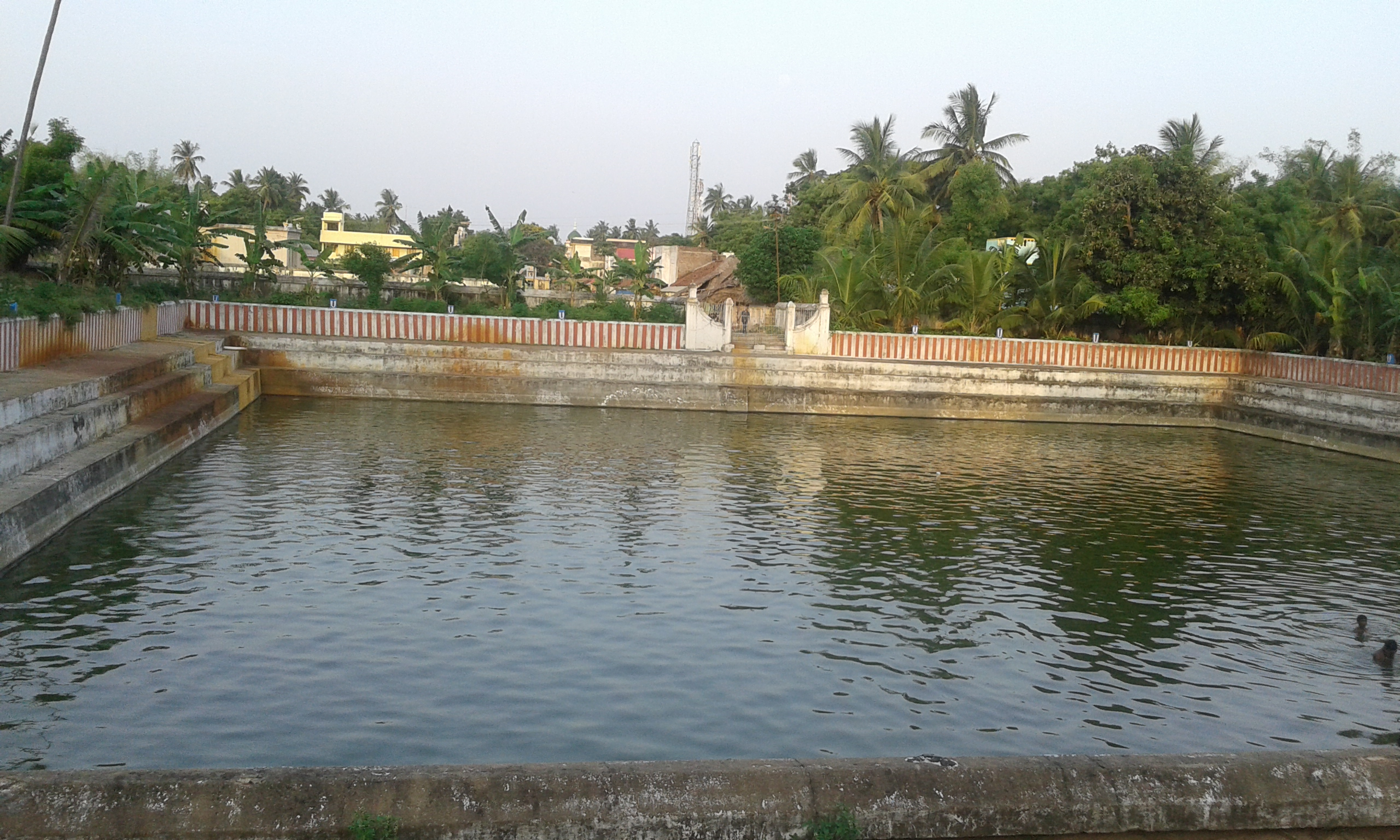
Temple tank, located in front of the temple

According to the temple's sthala purana, Uparichara Vasu, a king, obtained boons after severe penance for years from Brahma that would enable him to fly with his chariot. While flying at this place, his chariot (locally called ther) fell in waters and splashed on sage Agastya who was doing penance. The chariot got stuck in the place and hence it came to be known as Therazhundur (where the chariot got immersed). Another variant, Uparichara Vasu ruled in favour of celestial deities against the sages and the sages cursed that his chariot would not any further and it got stuck in the place. A third variant notes that the king did not heed the request of his queen to get down to worship Vishnu at this place while flying in his chariot and on account of divine powers his chariot was held at this place.

As per Hindu legend, Brahma, the Hindu god of creation, drove the cattle belonging to Krishna, an avatar of Vishnu. Krishna created another herd in the meanwhile. Realising that the herd belonged to Krishna, Brahma apologized and wished Krishna to set his abode at this place. Since Krishna appeared for the cattle and settled here, the presiding deity is called Amaruviappan (the one who is flanked by cattle). Following the legend, the presiding deity in the sanctum is portrayed with cattle surrounding him. As per another legend, Prahlada, an ardent devotee of Vishnu feared Narasimha, the avatar that killed Hiranyakakashipu, the asura father of Prahlada. Amaruviappan appeared to console Prahalad. There is another belief that Kaveri, the river goddess prayed Amaruviappan to relieve herself off the curse by sage Agastya. Vishnu was pleased by the devotion of Kaveri and appeared here to please her devotion.

== Architecture ==
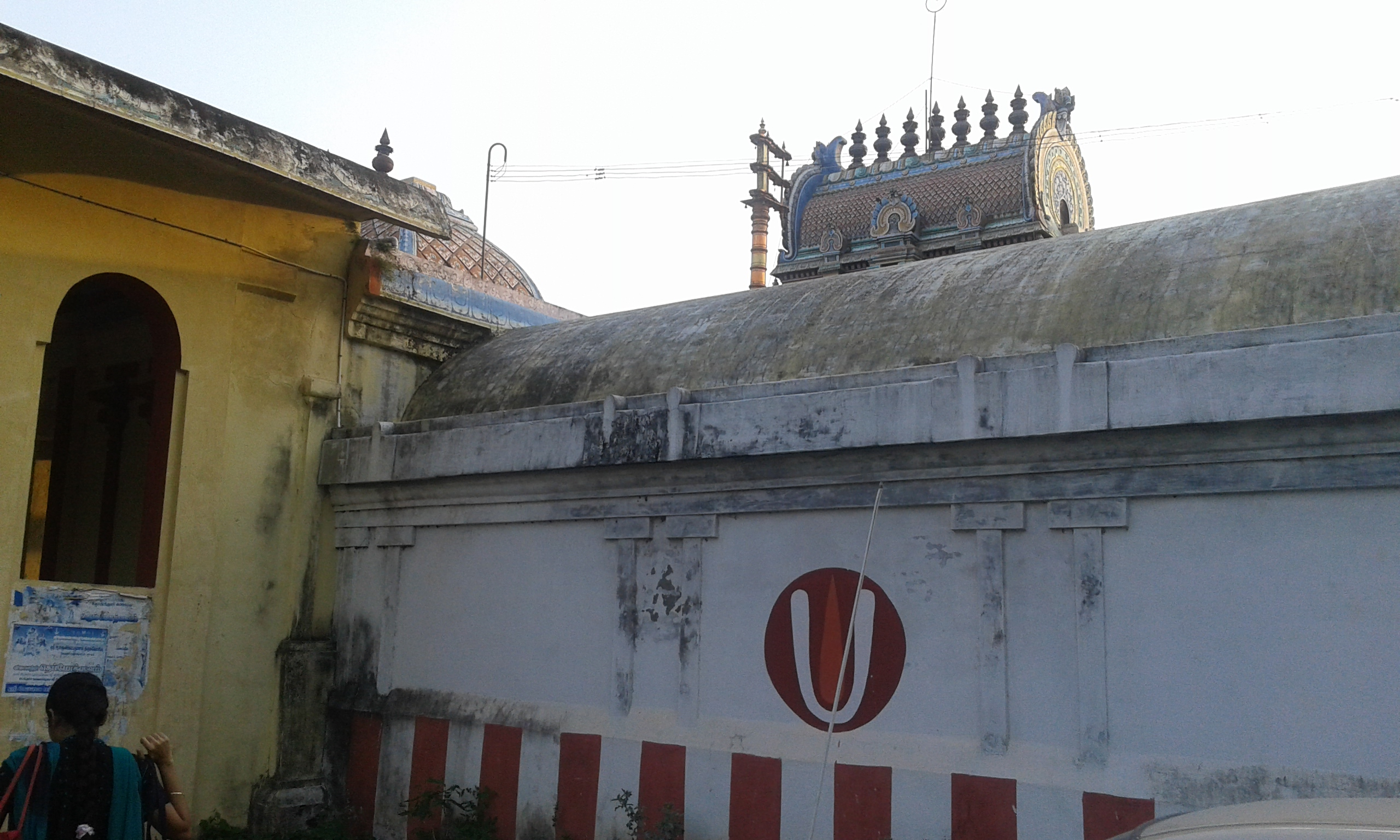
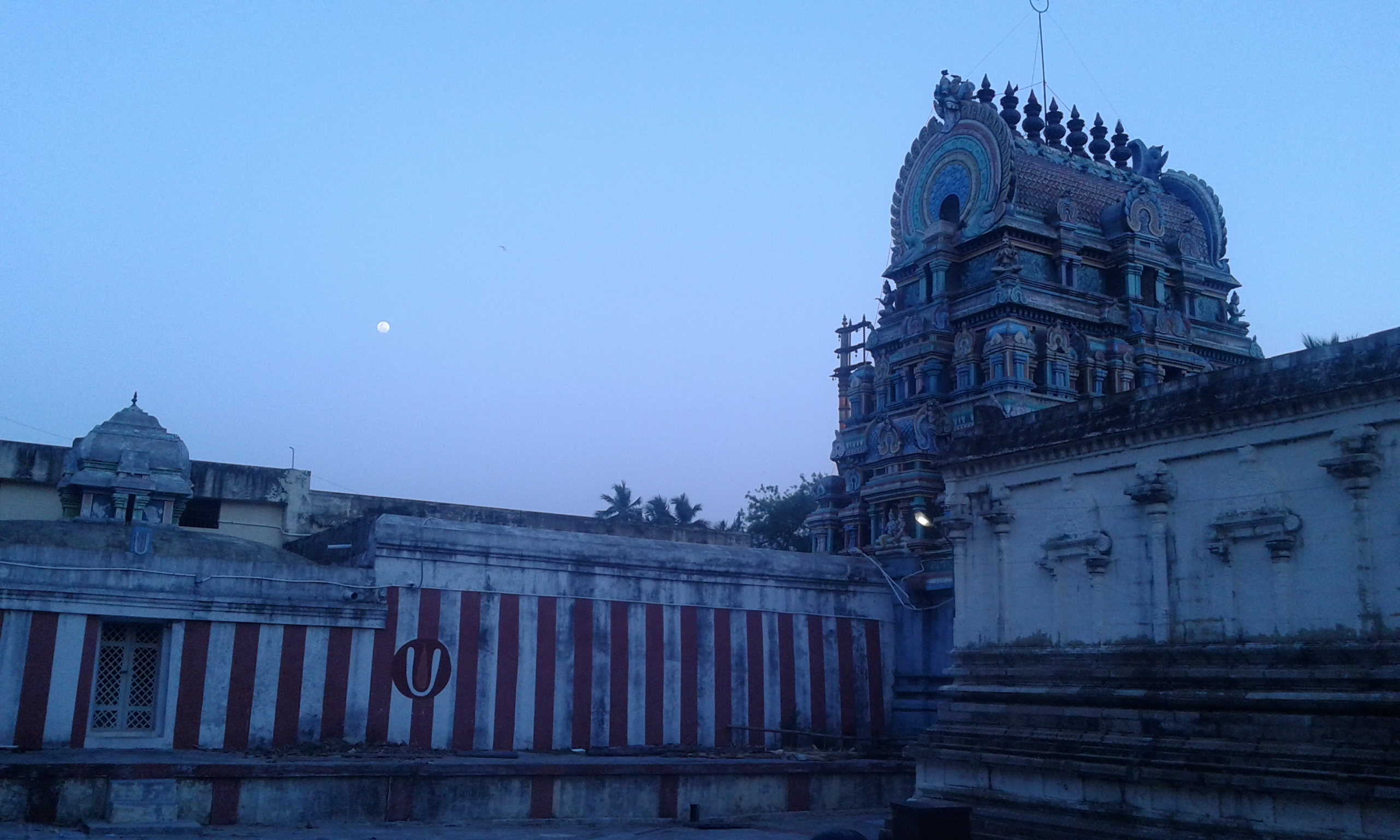
Images of shrines in the temple

Amaruviappan temple is located in Therazhundur, a village located 10 km (6.2 mi) from Mayiladuthurai in Mayiladuthurai district. The temple is believed to have been built by Karikala Chola during the 1st century CE, with additions in the later century. The temple tank is located in front of the temple and the temple is approached to the roads in the embankment. The temple has a five tiered rajagopuram, the gateway tower that pierces the granite concentric walls. The central shrine houses the image of Devadi raja Perumal in standing posture and the festival deity Amaruviappan, housed under the Garuda Vimanam. There are also other images of cattle and sages in the sanctum. There is a separate shrine of Sengamalavalli, the consort of Amaruviappan in the second precinct. There are separate shrines for Agastya, Narasimha, Rama, Vishvaksena, Hanuman, and the Alvars. Adishesha, Surya Prabhai, Indra Vimanam, horse and elephant are the mounts used for Amaruviappan. For the goddess, the mounts used are the yali, swan, elephant, and lion. The sub-temples of this shrine are Govindarajar temple. There are two water bodies associated with the temple along with river Kaveri, namely Darsa Pushkarani located in front of the temple and Gajendra Pushkarani in the northern side.

== Religious importance ==
Amaruviappan temple is revered in Naalayira Divya Prabhandam, the 7th–9th century Vaishnava canon, by Thirumangai Alvar. The temple is classified as a Divya Desam, one of the 108 Vishnu temples that are mentioned in the book. Thirumangai Alvar has glorified the powers of Sengamalavalli Thayar. The temple also finds mention in later works by Nathamuni, Thirukachi Nambi, Ramanuja and Manavala Mamunigal. During the 18th and 19th centuries, the temple finds mention in several works like 108 Tirupathi Anthathi by Divya Kavi Pillai Perumal Aiyangar. The temple is also one of the Pancha Krishnaranaya Kshetrams, the five divine places for Krishna, an avatar of Vishnu. Devaadi Raja Perumal is believed to be a representation of "Rakshakathvam", the divine protection rendered to true devotees of Vishnu.

== Worship practices and festivals ==
The temple follows Vadakalai tradition of worship based on Pancharatra Agamic tradition. The temple is open from 6:30 a.m. to 12 p.m. and 3:00 p.m. to 9:00 p.m. The temple priests perform the pooja (rituals) during festivals and on a daily basis. The temple rituals are performed four times a day: Ushathkalam at 8 a.m., Kalasanthi at 10:00 a.m., Sayarakshai at 5:00 p.m. and Ardha Jamam at 8:00 p.m. Each ritual has three steps: alangaram (decoration), neivethanam (food offering) and deepa aradanai (waving of lamps) for both Nithyakalyana Perumal and his consort Sengamalavalli. There are weekly, monthly and fortnightly rituals performed in the temple. Various festivals are celebrated in the temple, with the Vaikasi Brahmotsavam during the Tamil of Vaikasi (during May - June), Thiruvonam and Vaikuntha Ekadashi during Margali (December - January) being the most prominent. During the Brahmotsavam festival, the festival deities of Devaadi Raja Perumal and Sengamalavalli is taken in procession around the streets of the temple. The temple is maintained and administered by the Hindu Religious and Endowment Board of the Government of Tamil Nadu.

== Gallery ==
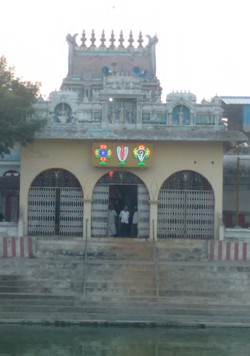
Entrance

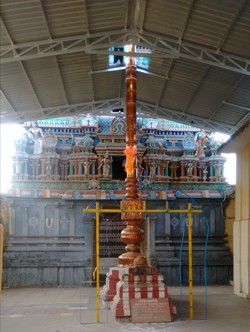
Bali peetam and flagpost

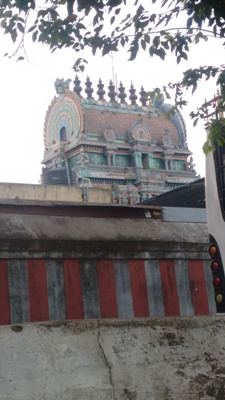
Rajagopuram

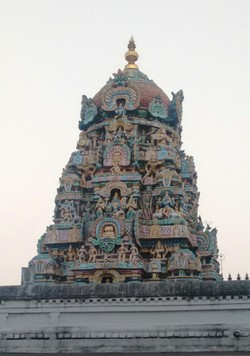
Vimana of presiding deity

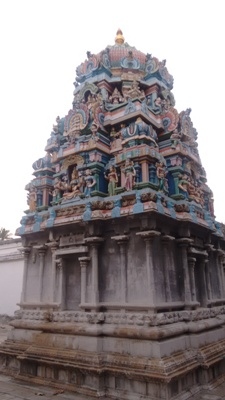
Alvar shrine

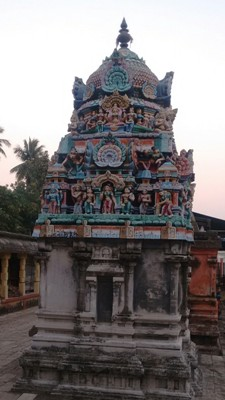
Andal shrine
