= Thirukkai Vazakkam =

Thirukkai Vazakkam is a literature sung in praise of the Vellalar / Kaaralar / agriculturist communities of Tamil Nadu by the great Tamil cannon Kambar (poet) in the 12th century A.D. The source of Thirukkai Vazakkam in Tamil is available in this link
