= Kamban Kazhagam =

Kamban Kazhagam (Kamban Academy) is a Tamil organization which was founded to promote Ramayana of Tamil poet Kambar. The organisation was formed by Tamil politician Saw Ganesan at Karaikudi in 1939. Kamban Kazhagam Chennai was fortified by R.M.Veerappan and Justice M M Ismail.

== Background and history ==
Kambar was a 12th-century Tamil poet who wrote Kamba Ramayanam, the life of Rama of Ayodhya. Kamba Ramayana differed on several aspects from the original version of Ramayana written by Sanskrit poet Valmiki. Kamba Ramayana emphasised Tamil culture and tradition more. It is considered as one of the greatest epic of the Tamil literature.

In 1937, Chief minister of Madras Presidency C. Rajagopalachari (Rajaji) introduced compulsory use of Indo-Aryan language Hindi in the educational institutions. To protest this move Self-Respect Movement leader Periyar E. V. Ramasamy launched Anti-Hindi agitations. Periyar said that introduction of Hindi was an attempt to destroy Dravidian culture by Aryans. Periyar said that Ramayana was about conquest of Dravidian King Ravana by Aryan King Rama. Periyar burned the epic Kamba Ramayana and alleged that Kambar destroyed Tamil culture by portraying Ravana as evil character in the epic.

During that period, Saw Ganesan, an admirer of Kamba Ramayana, thought that Kambar gave importance to the Tamil language and culture. He decided to popularize the Kambar's literary talent. He founded Kamban Kazhagam in 1939 at Karaikudi, Tamil Nadu, India. Literacy critic, T. K. Chidambaranatha Mudaliar, became President of the academy. Kambar inaugurated his work on Hastham star in Panguni month of Tamil calendar. Hence, Saw Ganesan chose 2–3 April 1939 to organise the first Kamban festival. He celebrated the final day of festival at Nattarasankottai where Kambar's tomb is situated.

Kamban Kazhagam organises the festival every year by conducting seminars and debates on Kambar's Ramayana. Upon this success many other Kamban Kazhagam were founded across India and overseas where the Tamil diaspora lived.
