= Ramavataram =

Tamil Hindu epic based on the Ramayana

Information
- Religion: Hinduism
- Author: Kambar
- Language: Tamil language
- Period: 12th century
- Chapters: 6 kandams (original) + 1 later addition

The Ramavataram, popularly referred to as Kamba Ramayanam, is a Tamil epic that was written by the Tamil poet Kambar during the 12th century. Based on Valmiki's Ramayana (which is in Sanskrit), the story describes the legend of King Rama of Ayodhya. However, the Ramavataram is different from the Sanskrit version in many aspects – both in spiritual concepts and in the specifics of the storyline. This historic work is considered by both Tamil scholars and the general public as one of the greatest literary works in Tamil literature.

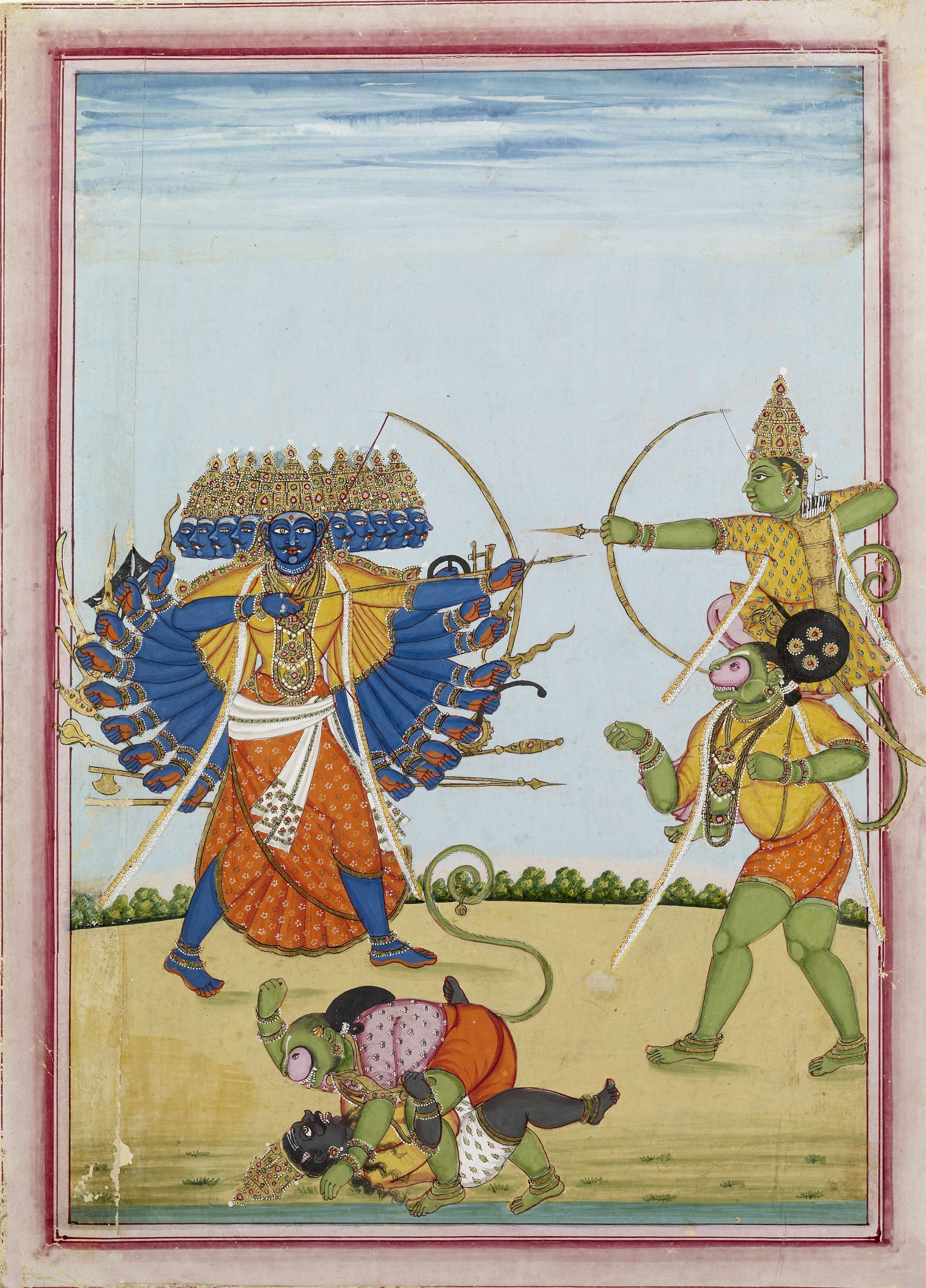
Rama and Hanuman fighting Ravana, an album painting on paper from Tamil Nadu, ca 1820.

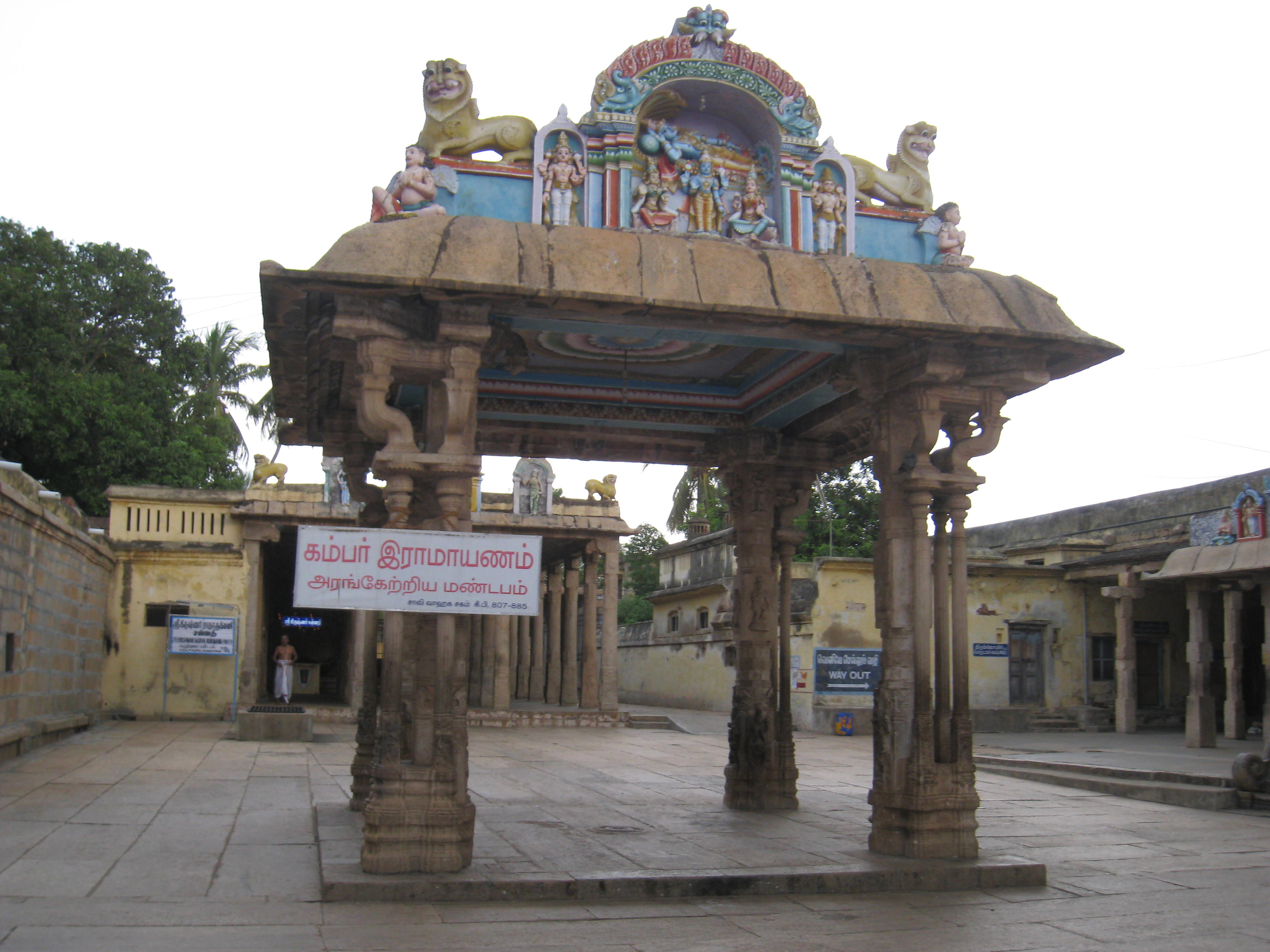
The Mandapam at The Ranganathasamy Temple, Srirangam where Kambar is believed to have first recited the epic

Kambar wrote this epic with the patronage of Thiruvennai Nallur Sadayappa Vallal, a chieftain of the Pannai lineage. In gratitude to his patron, Kamban references his name once in every 1,000 verses.

== Early references in Tamil literature ==
Even before Kambar wrote the Ramavataram in Tamil in the 12 century CE, there are many ancient references to the story of Ramayana, implying that the story was familiar in the Tamil lands even before the Common Era. References to the story can be found in the Sangam literature of Akanāṉūṟu (dated 200 BCE–300 CE), Puṟanāṉūṟu (dated 200 BCE–300 CE), the twin epics of Silappatikaram (dated 6th century CE) and Manimekalai, and the Alvar literature of Kulasekhara Alvar, Thirumangai Alvar, Andal and Nammalvar (dated between 8th and 10th centuries CE).

== Structure ==
The book is divided into six chapters, each called a Kandam in Tamil. The Kandams are further divided into 113 sections called Padalam (படலம்) in Tamil. These 113 sections contain approximately 10569 verses of the epic.

- Bala Kandam (The Childhood Chapter)
- Ayodhya Kandam (The Ayodhya Chapter)
- Aranya Kandam (The Forest Chapter)
- Kishkindha Kandam (The Kishkindha Chapter)
- Sundara Kandam (The Beautiful Chapter)
- Yuddha Kandam (The War Chapter)

== Compilation ==
As with many historic compilations, it was very difficult to discard the interpolations and addendum which have been added over a period of time to the original. This task was taken up a committee of scholars headed by T. P. Meenakshisundaram called the Kamban Kazhagam (Kamban Academy). The compilation published by this committee in 1976 is what is used as the standard today. Valmiki's Ramayana in Sanskrit has seven chapters. The Tamil poet Ottakoothar wrote Uttara Kandam, the seventh (last chapter) kandam of the Tamil epic Ramayanam.

== Literary significance ==
Kamban's use of Virutham (Sanskrit: vṛttam) and Santham (Sanskrit: chandas) in various verses is effective in bringing out the emotion and mood for storytelling. He achieves the Virutham and Santham by effective choice of words.

== Religious significance ==
This epic is read by many Hindus during prayers. In some households, the entire epic is read once during the Tamil calendar's month of Aadi (mid-July to mid-August). It is also read in Hindu Temples and other religious associations. On many occasions, Kambar talks about surrendering to Rama, who is a manifestation of Vishnu himself.

The chapter Sundara Kandam is considered very auspicious and is the most popular. The chapter talks about the hardships faced by the main characters in the epic, their practice of restraint, and their hopes for a better tomorrow.

== Translations ==
In 1961, C. Rajagopalachari translated the Kamba Ramayana into English. Another translation of the work into English was made by P. S. Sundaram. Nityananda Mohapatra translated the Tamil work into Odia.

== Musical adaptations ==
In August 2025, composer Raleigh Rajan spearheaded a sold-out, two-hour Carnatic concert based entirely on the Tamil epic Kamba Ramayanam at the Nack Theater, Dallas, TX. In addition to the traditional mridangam, violin, kanjira and tanpura, he incorporated piano—playing both chords and melodic leads—within traditional Carnatic ragas. The concert also featured poetry appreciation segments before each piece and digital paintings as a visual backdrop, enhancing the overall experience.

== See also ==
- Ramayana in Tamil literature
- Kamban Kazhagam
- Kambarmedu - an archaeological site located in Therizhandur, associated with the settlement of the Tamil poet Kambar.
