= Sadayappa Vallal =

Indian velir

Sadayappa Vallal was a wealthy 12th-century velir (chief) who had his residence He belonged to the Kathiramangalam area of Thanjavur, which was known as Chaturvedimangalam Venneinallur in the 10th century." He was known for his philanthropic activities. He was a close friend and a patron of Kambar, the Tamil poet who wrote Ramavataram (popularly known as Kamba Ramayanam). He was also associated closely with Pararajasingam, the king of Kandy, Ceylon.

== Patronage of Kambar ==
Kambar had a number of patrons but Sadayappa Vallal was foremost among them. He attended the wedding of Kambar's son; according to one story, on seeing that all the seats were taken, took an unassuming position standing on the side of the ceremony. Kambar, in gratitude for Sadayappa Vallal's patronage and forbearance, lauded Sadayappa Vallal every 1000 stanzas in the Tamil epic Kamba Ramayanam.

According to tradition, Kambar's son, Ambikapathi was later put to death for having fallen in love with the Chola King's daughter and Kambar himself had to flee. In his old age, he was then supported and patronised by his friend Sadaiyappan.

Sadaiyappa Vallal’s ancestors belonged to the Aluthur Vel, a Chozhiya Velir (Vellalar) lineage from the Chola country. He had the title “Udaiyan,” which the Chozhiya Vellalars used from the 10th to the 13th century. Many mistakenly call him a Mudaliyar and change the tradition. He only resettled the Thondaimandala Vellalars and Thuliva Vellalars; he was not from those lineages. He was a pure Chozhiya Vellalar.

== King Pararajasingam ==
Sadayappa Vallal was also a close friend of King Pararajasingam of Kandy, Ceylon. When Kandy was hit by a famine, he immediately came to the aid of his friend by sending rice and other necessities in numerous ships. He is praised for this event as thus (loosely translated):

Sangaran Sadayan of the liberal hand, who sent mountain loads of paddy in thousand ships to the country of Kandy for a Tamil verse composed in his praise by King Pararajasingan, wearing the honey dripping garland was of Chola Mandalam
