= Vidwan S. Shankar =

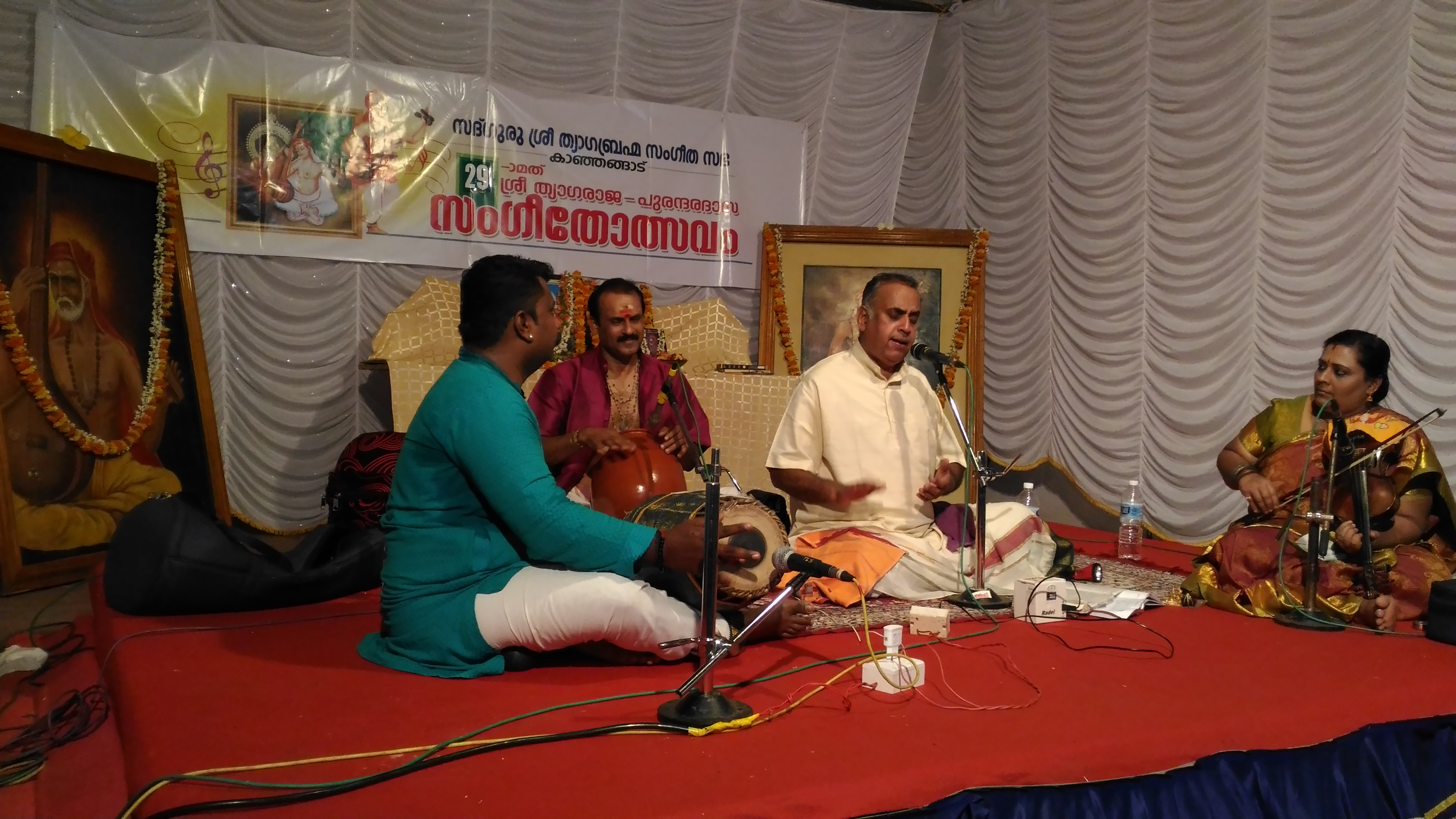
Vidwan S. Shankar sings at Kanhangad on 16 February 2017 – Tyagaraja-Purandaradasa Sangeetotsavam.

Vidwan S. Shankar (born 1950) is a popular Karnatic vocalist, the disciple of his mother Smt. Rajamma Shastri and also Smt. Nagaratna Bai and Smt. Vallabham Kalyana Sundaram. A performer for more than five decades, he is an "A top" grade artist of A.I.R. & Doordarshan.

Belonging to a family of musicians, he was instructed in the basics of Carnatic music by his own mother, Rajamma Shastri. Shankar became the disciple of Guru Vallabham Kalyana Sundaram when he was 12 years old.

He participated in the national programme of music over A.I.R. and D.D. In 1998 and 2007 and also in the Radio Sangeeta Sammelan in 1992 and 2004 at Mumbai.

He won the first prize in A.I.R. competition in 1973, Best Musician Award by the Bangalore Gayana Samaja and the best young musician award by the Music Academy, Chennai. He has performed all over the country and at many places in the U.S. He has conducted music workshops at Bharatiya vidya bhavan in London and has performed at the venue too. He has performed jugalbandi concerts with Hindustani vocalists.

He is endowed with a sturdy voice and his rendering of raga is mellifluous and enthralling. His repertoire consists of the compositions of the trinity, Swati Tirunal, Patnam Subrahmanya Iyer, Jayachamarajendra Wodaiyaar, Mysore Vasudevachar, Mayuram Vishwanatha Shastri, Papanasham Shivan, D.V.Gundappa, Padmacharan & Haidasas. His rendering of slokas is unique.

Shankar has been chosen as the Asthaana Vidwan of both the Avani Sharada Shringeri Peetham and the Kanchi Kamakoti Peetham. His music is said to be an offering to divinity.

He has a number of cassettes / CDs to his credit. He has directed music for musical features, documentaries and dramas on A.I.R & D.D.
