= Silai Elupatu =

Tamil work of literature

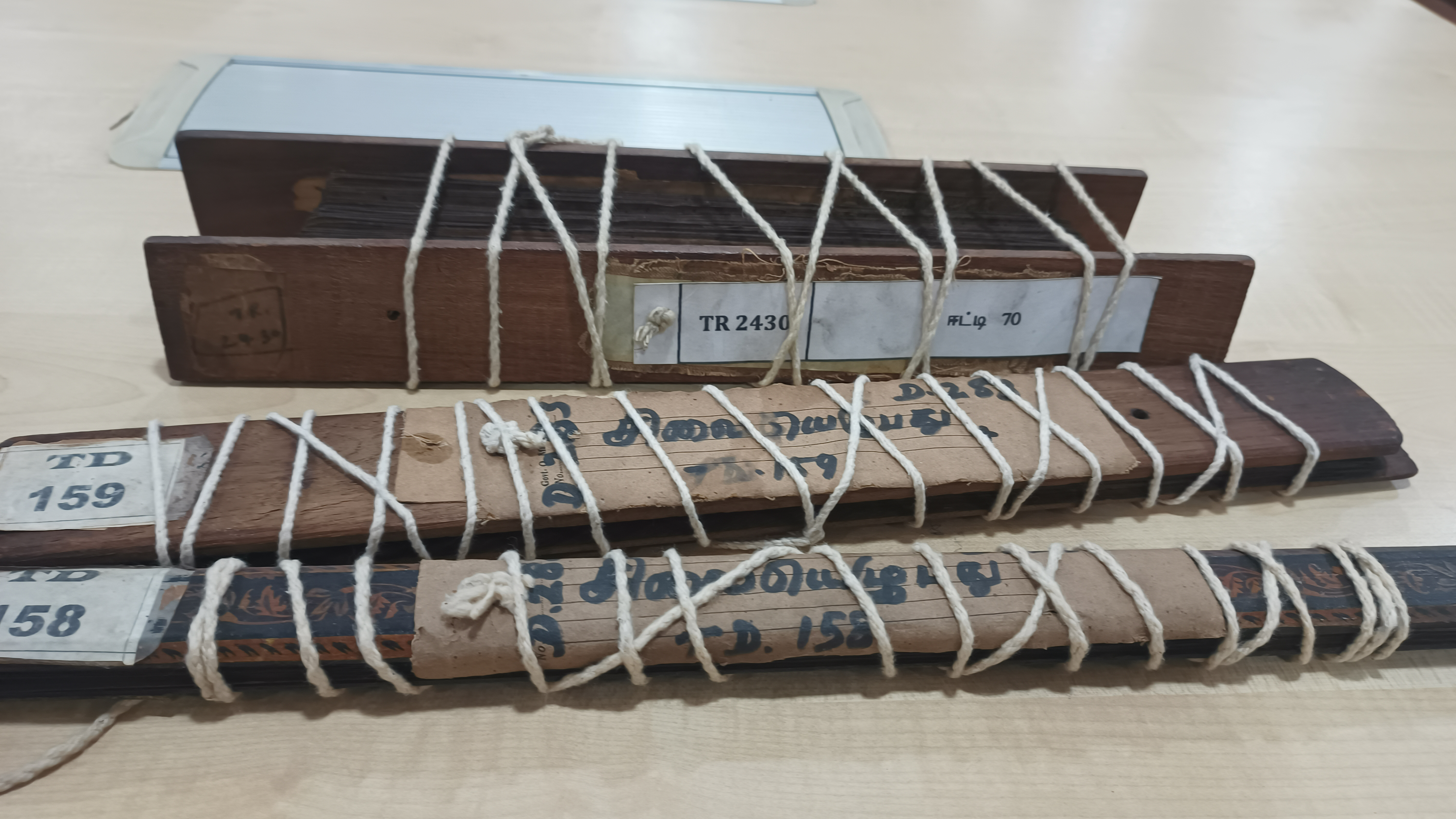
Palm leaf bindle of Silai Elupatu

Silai Elupatu (Tamil: சிலை எழுபது, romanized: Seventy statues) is one of the nine books attributed to the renowned Tamil poet Kambar. It was written to describe people's way of life in ancient Tamilakam.

The poem celebrates the victory of the Kalinga War and extols the glory of the Vanniyars, particularly focusing on Karunakara Thondaiman, the esteemed general of the first Kulothunga Chola (1070 AD – 1118 AD). Thondaiman served as a sub-royal under the Cholas, governing the Pallava region. Historical records indicate that in recognition of his literary prowess, Kambar was honored with a gold palanquin, ornamental gifts, and a reward of one thousand gold coins per sikula (verse). It includes reference to various gotras.
