= Therizhandur =

Therazhandur
- Village
- Location in Tamil Nadu, India Therazhandur (India)
- Coordinates: 11.04°N 79.58°E
- Country: India
- State: Tamil Nadu
- District: Mayiladuthurai

Languages
  - Official: Tamil
- Time zone: UTC+5:30 (IST)
- PIN: 609808
- Telephone code: 04364
- Vehicle registration: TN:82
- Website: www.tzronline.in

Therazhandur is a village in the Kuthalam of Mayiladuthurai district, Tamil Nadu, India.

Kambar Medu the birthplace of Tamil poet Kambar is here. An achaeological site associated with his settlement located in Therizhandur.
