= Kambar (poet) =

12th-century Indian poet of Tamil language

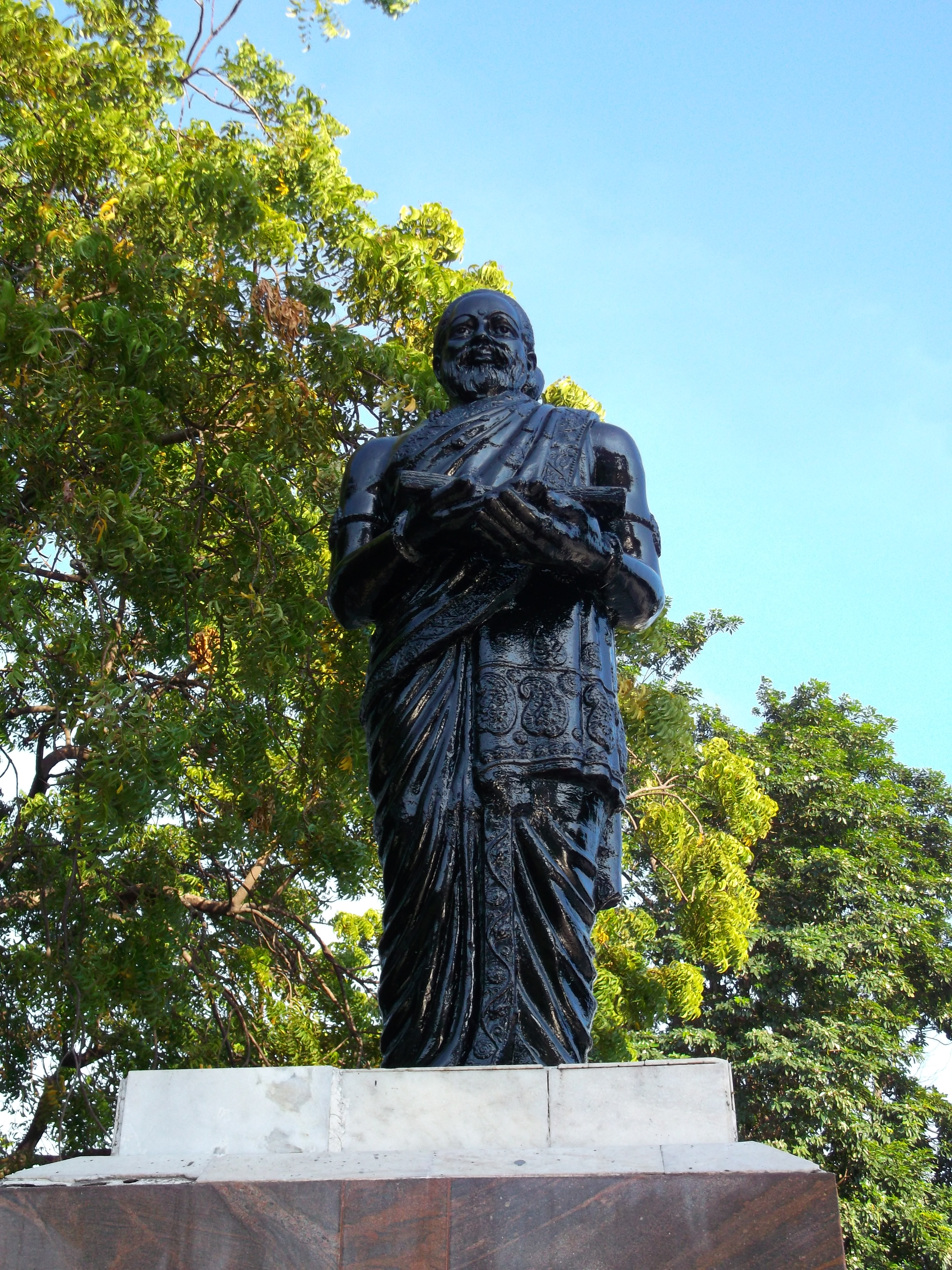
- Statue of Kambar at Marina Beach, Chennai
- Born: 1180; Therizhandur (in present-day Tamil Nadu, India)
- Died: 1250 (aged 69–70); Nattarasankottai (in present-day Tamil Nadu, India)
- Occupation: Poet
- Writing career
- Language: Tamil
- Notable works: Ramavataram; Silai Elupatu

Kambar, or Kamban (1180–1250), was a medieval Tamil poet. He is the author of the Ramavataram, popularly known as Kambaramayanam, the Tamil version of the Hindu epic Ramayana. He had also authored several other literary works in Tamil including Silai Elupatu, Kangai Puranam, Sadagopar Antati and Saraswati Antati.

== Life ==
Kambar was believed to have been born in Therazhundur (in present day Tamil Nadu). He was supported and patronised by Sadayappa Vallal. He grew up in the Chola Empire during the reign of Kulothunga Chola III. Having heard of Kamban's talent, Kulothunga summoned him to his court and honoured him with the title Kavi Chakravarty (Emperor of poets). Kamban was well versed in Tamil and Sanskrit languages. His life time is dated to the 12th century CE, after the lifetime of Vaishnavite philosopher Ramanuja, as the poet refers to the latter in his work.

There are no clear information of his later whereabouts, with multiple stories in folklore. As per one theory, Kamban spent his last days in Nattarasankottai near present day Sivagangai. After having differences with Kulothunga's son, Rajaraja III, he left the Chola kingdom and moved from place to place. When he reached at Nattarasankottai, he decided to stay there and spent his last days there. There is tomb dedicated to him at the location and the annual Kamban vizha is conducted at this place to felicitate Kambar.

In another story, Kamban was exiled by Kulothunga due to a misunderstanding, and Kulothunga executed Kamban's son Ambigapathy for having a love affair with his daughter. Grief-stricken and enraged at Kulothunga's brutality, Kamban wandered around the Tamil lands and finally entered the service of the Cheras. He eventually returned again when invited by the Chola ruler, but this renewed friendship was short-lived, and tensions rose once more. Kulothunga ultimately executed Kamban on the pretext that he had maintained ties with the Chera king and had murdered the youngest prince. Before his death, Kamban cursed the king, declaring that his lineage would come to an end.

== Literary works ==
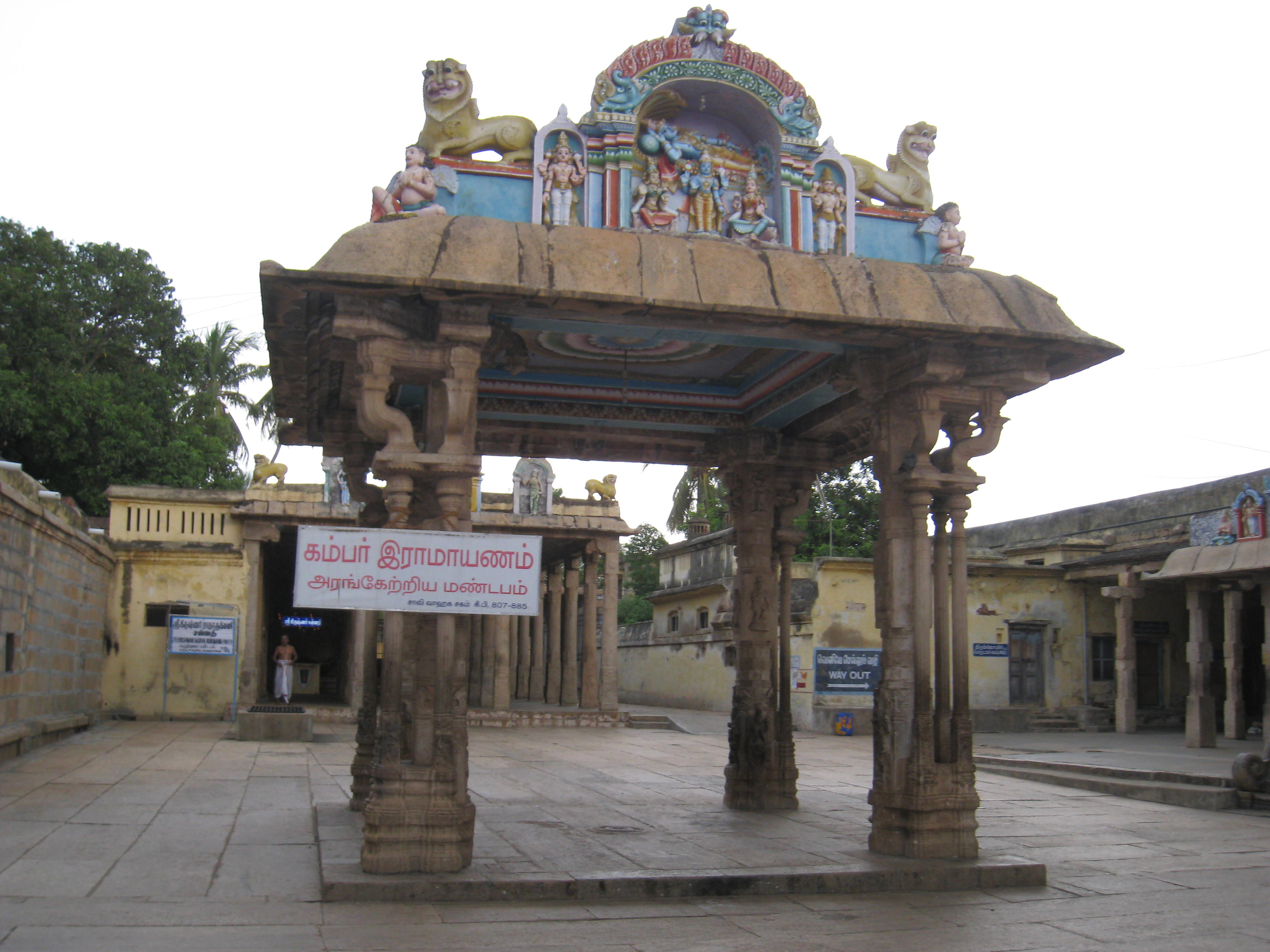
Kamba Ramyanam Mandapam at The Ranganathasamy Temple, Srirangam, where he is believed to have recited the epic

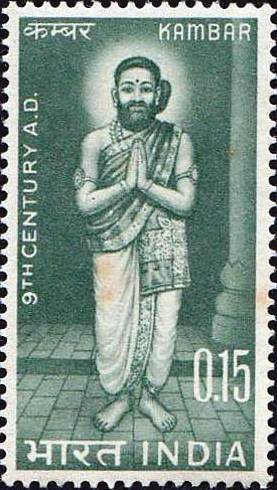
1966 Postage stamp

- Kamba Ramayanam (also called Ramavataram), a retelling of the Indian epic Ramayana in Tamil. It consists of 11,000 stanzas. It was accepted into the holy precincts in the presence of Nathamuni.
- Saraswati Antati, literary work of antati style in praise of Hindu Goddess Saraswati
- Sadagopar Antati, antati in praise of Vaishnava Saint Nammalvar
- Silai Elupatu, work in praise of 11th century CE Pallava king Karunakara Tondaiman
- Tirukkai Valakkam
- Erelupathu
- Kangai Puranam
- Mangala Vazhthu

== In popular culture ==
Kamban is portrayed by Serukalathur Sama in the Tamil-language film Ambikapathy (1937). In the film Ambikapathy (1957), M. K. Radha played Kamban.

== See also ==
- Kambarmedu, an archaeological site associated with Kamban
