= Agastya =

Vedic sage

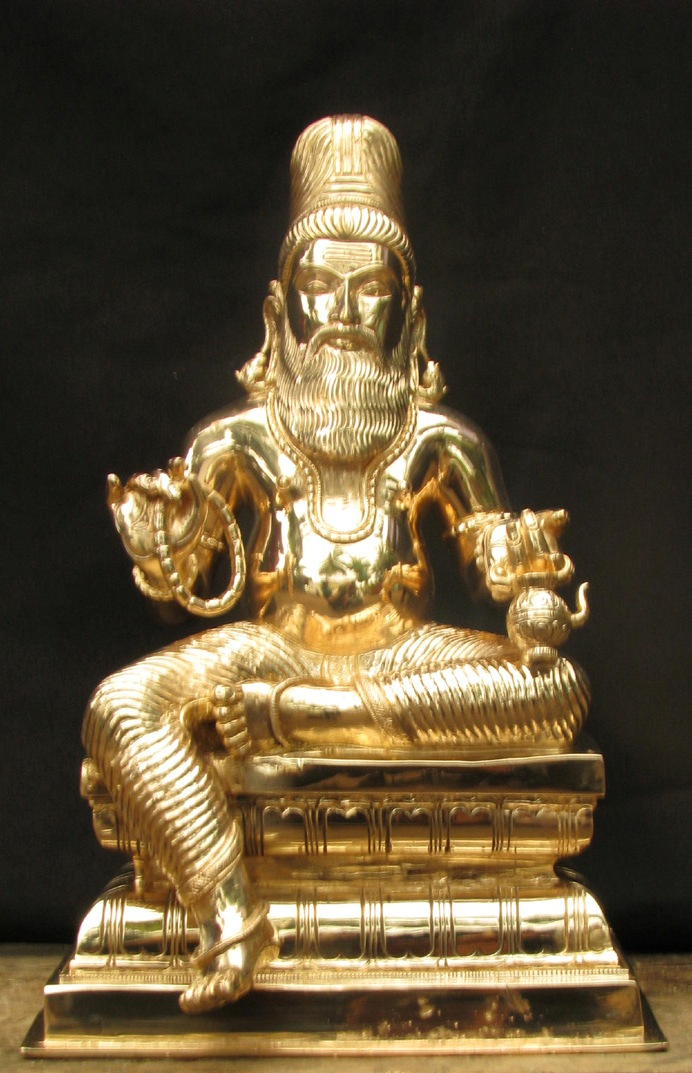
- Statue of Agastya
- Title: Siddhar

Personal life
- Spouse: Lopamudra
- Children: Drdhasyu
- Parent(s): Mitra-Varuna (father) and Urvashi (mother) or Pulastya (father) and Havirbhū (mother)

Religious life
- Religion: Historical Vedic religion

Agastya was a revered Indian sage of Hinduism. In the Indian tradition, he is a noted recluse and an influential scholar in diverse languages of the Indian subcontinent. He is regarded in some traditions to be a chiranjivi. The 8th-century Tamil commentary Iraiyanar Akapporul names Agastya as the head of the First Tamil Sangam in Then Madurai, which was submerged by the sea in ancient times. It also states that his work, Agattiyam, served as the Tamil grammatical authority for that entire era. He and his wife Lopamudra are the celebrated authors of hymns 1.165 to 1.191 in the Sanskrit text Rigveda and other Vedic literature.

Agastya is considered to be the father of Siddha medicine. Agastya appears in numerous itihasas and Puranas including the major Ramayana and Mahabharata. He is one of the seven most revered rishis (the Saptarishi) in the Vedic texts, and is revered as one of the Tamil Siddhar in the Shaivism tradition, who invented an early grammar of the Old Tamil language, Agattiyam, playing a pioneering role in the development of Tampraparniyan medicine and spirituality at Saiva centres in proto-era Sri Lanka and South India. He is also revered in the Puranic literature of Shaktism and Vaishnavism. He is one of the Indian sages found in ancient sculpture and reliefs in Hindu temples of South Asia, and Southeast Asia such as in the early medieval era Shaiva temples on Java Indonesia. He is the principal figure and Guru in the ancient Javanese language text Agastyaparva, whose 11th-century version survives.

Agastya is traditionally attributed to be the author of many Tamil and Sanskrit texts such as Sirragathiyam, Agastya Gunavagadam, Agastya 12000, the Agastya Gita found in Varaha Purana, Agastya Samhita found embedded in Skanda Purana, and the Dvaidha-Nirnaya Tantra text. He is also referred to as Mana, Kalasaja, Kumbhaja, Kumbhayoni and Maitravaruni after his mythical origins.

== Etymology and nomenclature ==
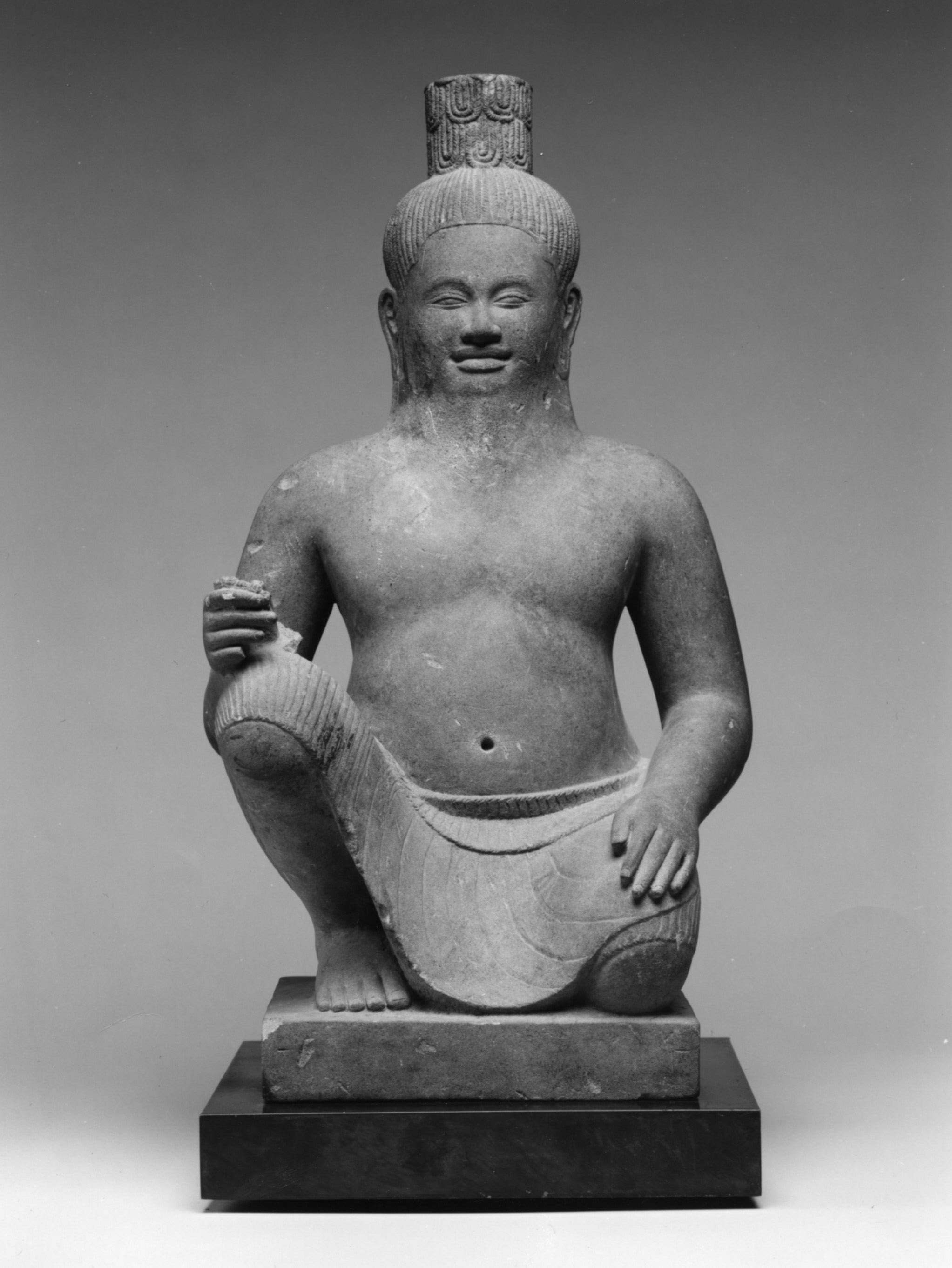
Sage Agastya in seated posture. This sculpture is from Angkor period, Cambodia, c. 975 CE.

Several different etymologies have been suggested for "Agastya". One theory states that the root is Aj or Anj, which connotes "brighten, effulgent one" and links Agastya to "one who brightens" in darkness, and Agastya is traditionally the Indian name for Canopus, the second most brilliantly shining star found in skies in the Indian sub-continent, next to Sirius. A third theory links it to Indo-European origins, through the Iranian word gasta which means "sin, foul", and a-gasta would mean "not sin, not foul". The fourth theory, based on folk etymology in verse 2.11 of the Ramayana states that Agastya is from aga (unmoving or mountain) and gam (move), and together these roots connote "one who is mover-of-mountains", or "mover-of-the-unmoving". The word is also written as Agasti and Agastya.

== Biography ==
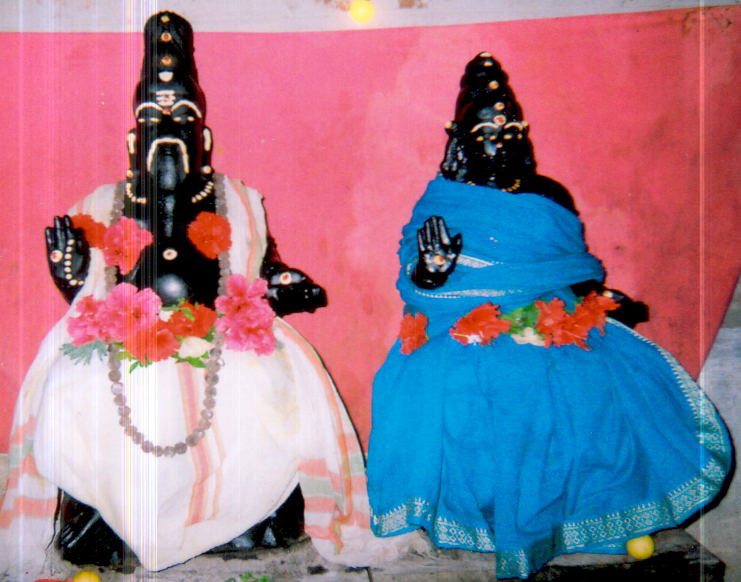
Maharishi Agastya and Lopāmudrā

Agastya leads an ascetic life, educates himself, becoming a celebrated sage. He is from the Pothigai Hills of Southern Tamil Nadu, and there is a waterfall there called Agastya Falls.

Agastya is the named author of several hymns of the Rigveda. These hymns do not provide his biography. The origins of Agastya - Pulastya, one of the Rig Vedic Saptarishis is his father. His miraculous rebirth follows a yajna being done by gods Varuna and Mitra, where the celestial apsara Urvashi appears. They are overwhelmed by her extraordinary sexuality and ejaculate. Their semen falls into a mud pitcher, which is the womb in which the fetus of Agastya grows. He is born from this jar, along with his twin sage Vasistha in some mythologies. This mythology gives him the name kumbhayoni, which literally means "he whose womb was a mud pot".

According to inconsistent legends in the Puranic and the epics, the ascetic sage Agastya proposed to Lopamudra, a princess born in the kingdom of Vidarbha. Her parents were unwilling to bless the engagement, concerned that she would be unable to live the austere lifestyle of Agastya in the forest. However, the legends state that Lopamudra accepted him as her husband, saying that Agastya has the wealth of ascetic living, her own youth will fade with seasons, and it is his virtue that makes him the right person. Therewith, Lopamudra becomes the wife of Agastya. In other versions, Lopamudra marries Agastya, but after the wedding, she demands that Agastya provide her with basic comforts before she will consummate the marriage, a demand that ends up forcing Agastya to return to society and earn wealth.

Agastya and Lopamudra have a son named Drdhasyu, sometimes called Idhmavaha. He is described in the Mahabharata as a boy who learns the Vedas by listening to his parents while he is in the womb, and is born into the world reciting the hymns.

=== Agastya ashram ===
In Southern sources and the North Indian Devi-Bhagavata Purana, his ashram is based in Tamil Nadu, variously placed in Tirunelveli, the Pothigai Hills, or Thanjavur. Facing east, he penanced upon a rock at Kanyakumari immediately after the beginning of Kali Yuga. It is also considered that his final resting place is in Agastyarkoodam in Thiruvananthapuram. Agastya had a hermitage (ashram), but the ancient and medieval era Indian texts provide inconsistent stories and location for this ashram. Two legends place it in Northwest Maharashtra, on the banks of the river Godavari, near Nashik in small towns named Agastyapuri and Akole. Other putative sites mentioned in Northern and Eastern Indian sources are near Sangli in Ainwadi (Agastinagar) (Tal-khanapur) village (Western Ghats at Maharashtra), or near Kannauj (Uttar Pradesh), or in Agastyamuni village near Rudraprayag (Uttarakhand), or Satpura Range (Madhya Pradesh).

== Textual sources ==
=== Tamil texts ===
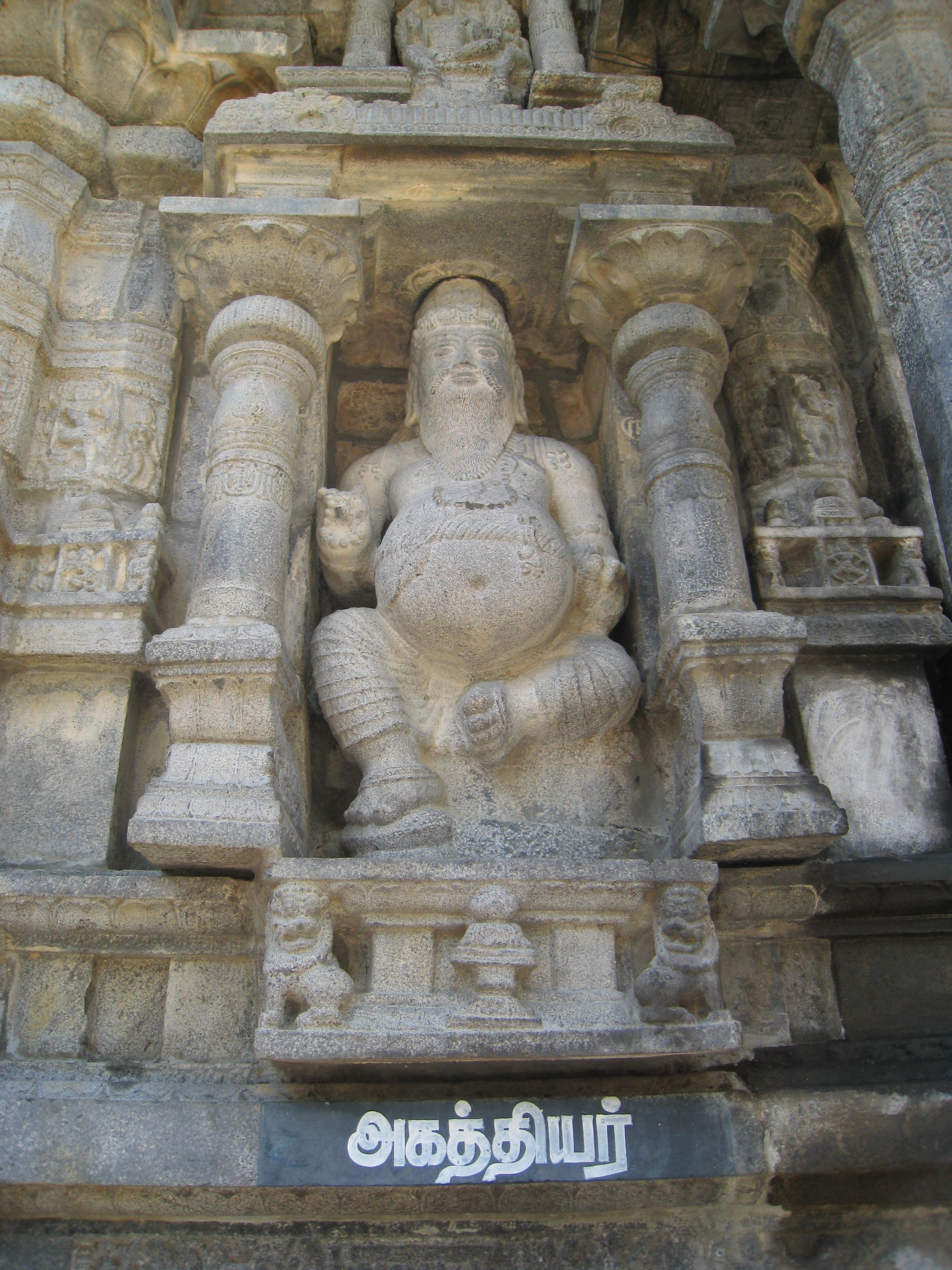
Agastya, Tamil Nadu

In Tamil traditions, Agastya is considered as the father of the Tamil language and the compiler of the first Tamil grammar, called Agattiyam or Akattiyam. Agastya has been a culture hero in Tamil traditions and appears in numerous Tamil texts. Agastya learnt the Tamil language from god Murugan.

There are similarities and differences between the Northern and Southern (Tamil) traditions about Agastya. In the northern legends, Agastya's role in spreading Vedic tradition and Sanskrit is emphasized, while in southern traditions his role in spreading irrigation, agriculture and augmenting the Tamil language is emphasized. In the north, his ancestry is unknown with mythical legends limiting themselves to saying that Agastya was born from a mud pitcher.

The northern traditional stories, states Mahadevan, are "nothing more than a collection of incredible fables and myths", while the southern versions "ring much truer and appear to be a down-to-earth account of a historical event". The earliest mention of the role of Agastya in the Tamil language, according to Richard Weiss, can be traced to the Iraiyanar Akapporul by the 8th-century author Nakkirar. However, in medieval-era stories of the Tamil tradition, Agastya pioneered the first Sangam period, which lasted 4,440 years, and took part in the second Sangam period, which lasted another 3,700 years.

The Tirumantiram describes Agastya as an ascetic sage, who lived in the Pothigai mountains because Shiva asked him to. He is described as the one who perfected and loved both Sanskrit and Tamil languages, amassing knowledge in both, thus becoming a symbol of integration, harmony and learning, instead of being opposed to either. According to the Skanda Purana, the whole world visited the Himalayas when Shiva was about to wed Parvati. This caused the earth to tip to one side. Shiva then requested Agastya to go to the southern region to restore the equilibrium. Thus, Agastya migrated south at Shiva's behest.

==== Siddhar ====
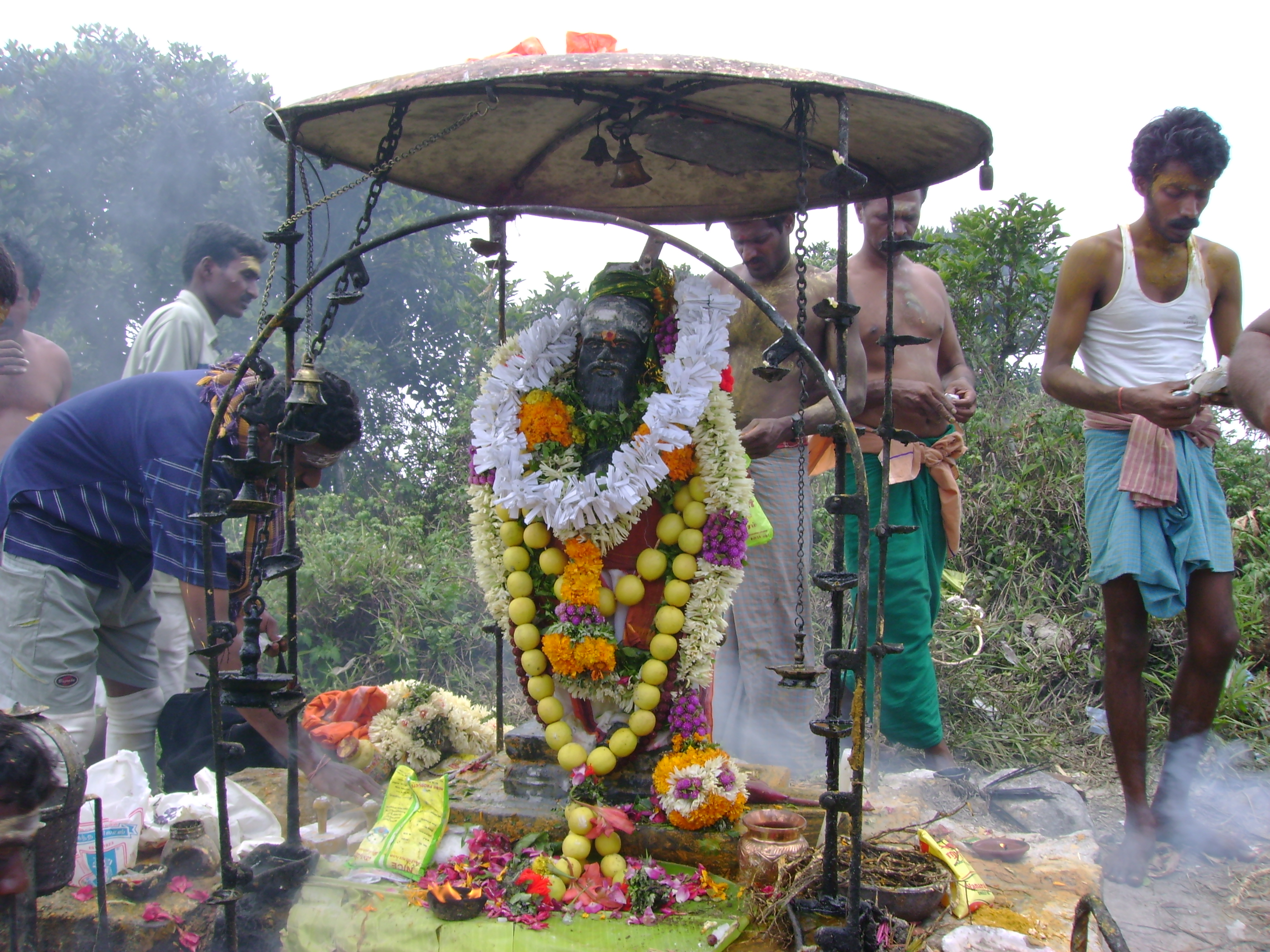
Reverence at the Agastya shrine atop the peak of Agastya mala, with garlands of fruits and flowers.

Agastya, in Tamil Hindu traditions, is considered as the first and foremost Siddhar (Tamil: cittar, Sanskrit: siddha). As the first Siddhar, Agasthiyar is deemed as the first master, accomplished, the sage who perfected his knowledge of the natural and spiritual worlds. This Tamil concept has parallels to Tibetan mahasiddhas, Sri Lankan Buddhist, and Nath Hindu yogi traditions of north India.

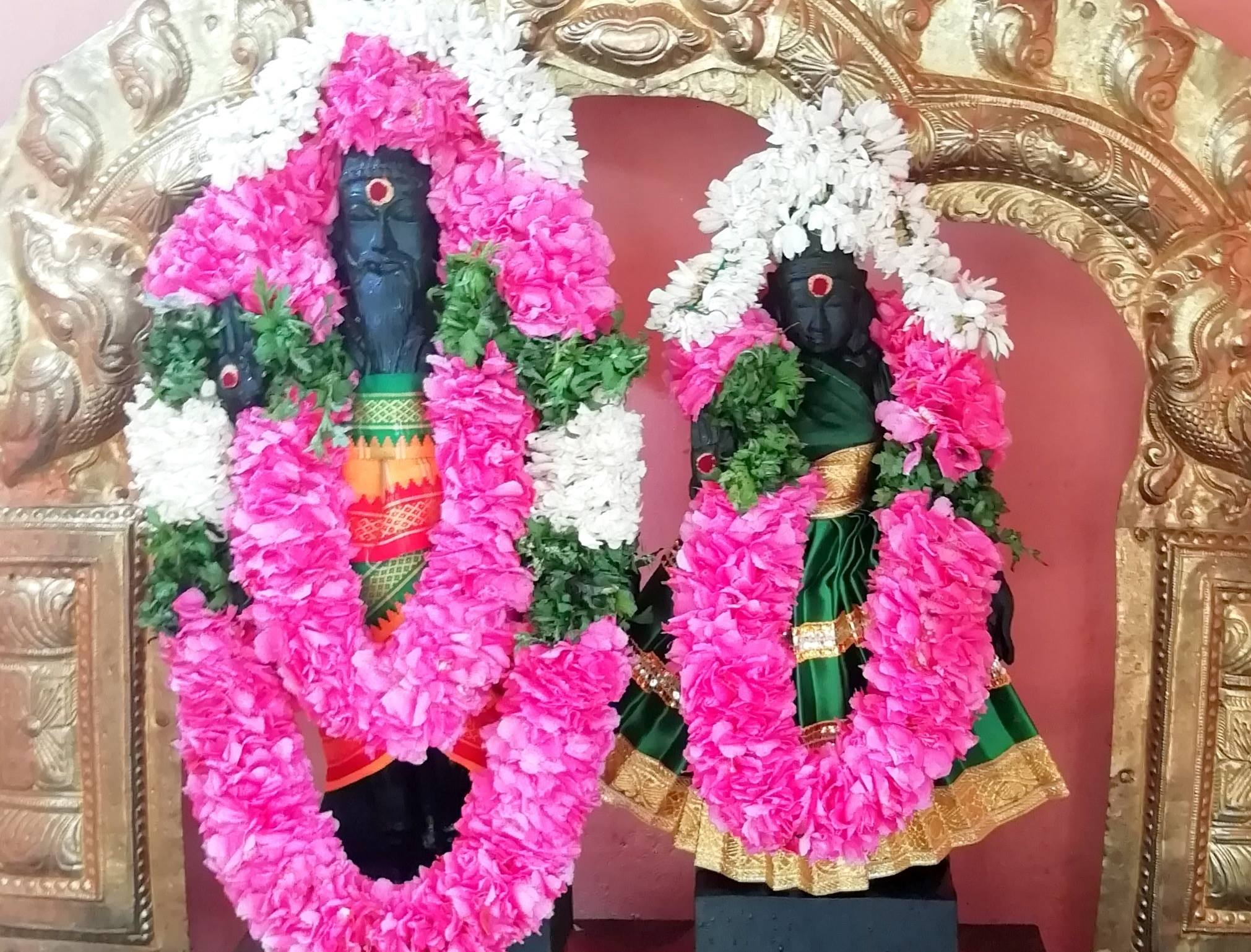
Lobamudra sameda Agasthiyar Temple, A. Vallalapatti, Madurai

Agastya, along with Tirumular, is considered a siddhar in both philosophical and practical domains, unlike most other siddhar who are revered for their special domain of knowledge. Agastya is also unique for the reverence he has received in historic texts all over the Indian subcontinent.

According to Venkatraman, the Siddhar-related literature about Agastya is late medieval to early modern era. In particular, all medicine and health-related Tamil text, that include Agasthiyar as the Siddhar, have been composed in and after the 15th century. According to Hartmut Scharfe, the oldest medicine siddhar Tamil text mentioning Agastya were composed no earlier than the 16th century.

His name is spelled as Agastya or Agasthiyar in some Tamil texts, and some consider the writer of the medical texts to be a different person.

According to Kamil Zvelebil, the sage Agastya, Akattiyan the Siddhar, and Akatthiyar, the author of Akattiyam, were three or possibly four different persons of different eras, who over time became fused into one single person in the Tamil tradition.

=== Vedas ===
Agastya is mentioned in all the four Vedas of Hinduism, and is a character in the Brahmanas, Aranyakas, Upanishads, epics, and many Puranas. He is the author of hymns 1.165 to 1.191 of the Rigveda (~1200 BCE). He ran a Vedic school (gurukul), as evidenced by hymn 1.179 of the Rigveda which credits its author to be his wife Lopamudra and his students. He was a respected sage in the Vedic era, as many other hymns of the Rigveda composed by other sages refer to Agastya. The hymns composed by Agastya are known for verbal play and similes, puzzles and puns, and striking imagery embedded within his spiritual message.

Agastya vedic verses

With thee, O Indra, are most bounteous riches
that further every one who lives uprightly.
Now may these Maruts show us loving-kindness,
Gods who of old were ever prompt to help us.
—1.169.5,
Transl: Ralph T.H. Griffith

May we know refreshment,
and a community having lively waters.
—1.165.15, 1.166.15, 1.167.11, etc.
Transl: Stephanie Jamison, Joel Brereton;

— Rigveda

His Vedic poetry is particularly notable for two themes. In one set of hymns, Agastya describes a conflict between two armies led by gods Indra and Maruts, which scholars such as G. S. Ghurye have interpreted as an allegory of a conflict between Arya (Indra) and Dasa (Rudra). Agastya successfully reconciles their conflict, makes an offering wherein he prays for understanding and loving-kindness between the two. Twenty one out of the twenty seven hymns he composed in Mandala 1 of the Rigveda have his signature ending, wherein he appeals, "may each community know refreshment (food) and lively waters". These ideas have led him to be considered as a protector of both the Arya and the Dasa. However, some scholars interpret the same hymns to be an allegory for any two conflicting ideologies or lifestyles, because Agastya never uses the words Arya or Dasa, and only uses the phrase ubhau varnav (literally, "both colors"). The theme and idea of "mutual understanding" as a means for lasting reconciliation, along with Agastya's name, reappears in section 1.2.2 of the Aitareya Aranyaka of Hinduism.

The second theme, famous in the literature of Hinduism, is a discussion between his wife Lopamudra and him about the human tension between the monastic solitary pursuit of spirituality, versus the responsibility of a householder's life and raising a family. Agastya argues that there are many ways to happiness and liberation, while Lopamudra presents her arguments about the nature of life, time and the possibility of both. She successfully seduces Agastya, in the simile filled Rigvedic hymn 1.179.

Agastya is mentioned in both the oldest and the youngest layers of the Rigveda (c. 1500–1200 BCE), such as in hymn 33 of mandala 7, which is older than mandala 1. He is also mentioned in the other three Vedas and the Vedanga literature such as in verses 5.13–14 of the Nirukta. Agastya and his ideas are cited in numerous other Vedic texts, such as section 7.5.5 of Taittiriya Samhita, 10.11 of Kathaka Samhita, 2.1 of Maitrayani Samhita, 5.16 of Aitareya Brahmana, 2.7.11 of Taittiriya Brahmana, and 21.14 of Pancavimsati Brahmana.

=== Ramayana ===
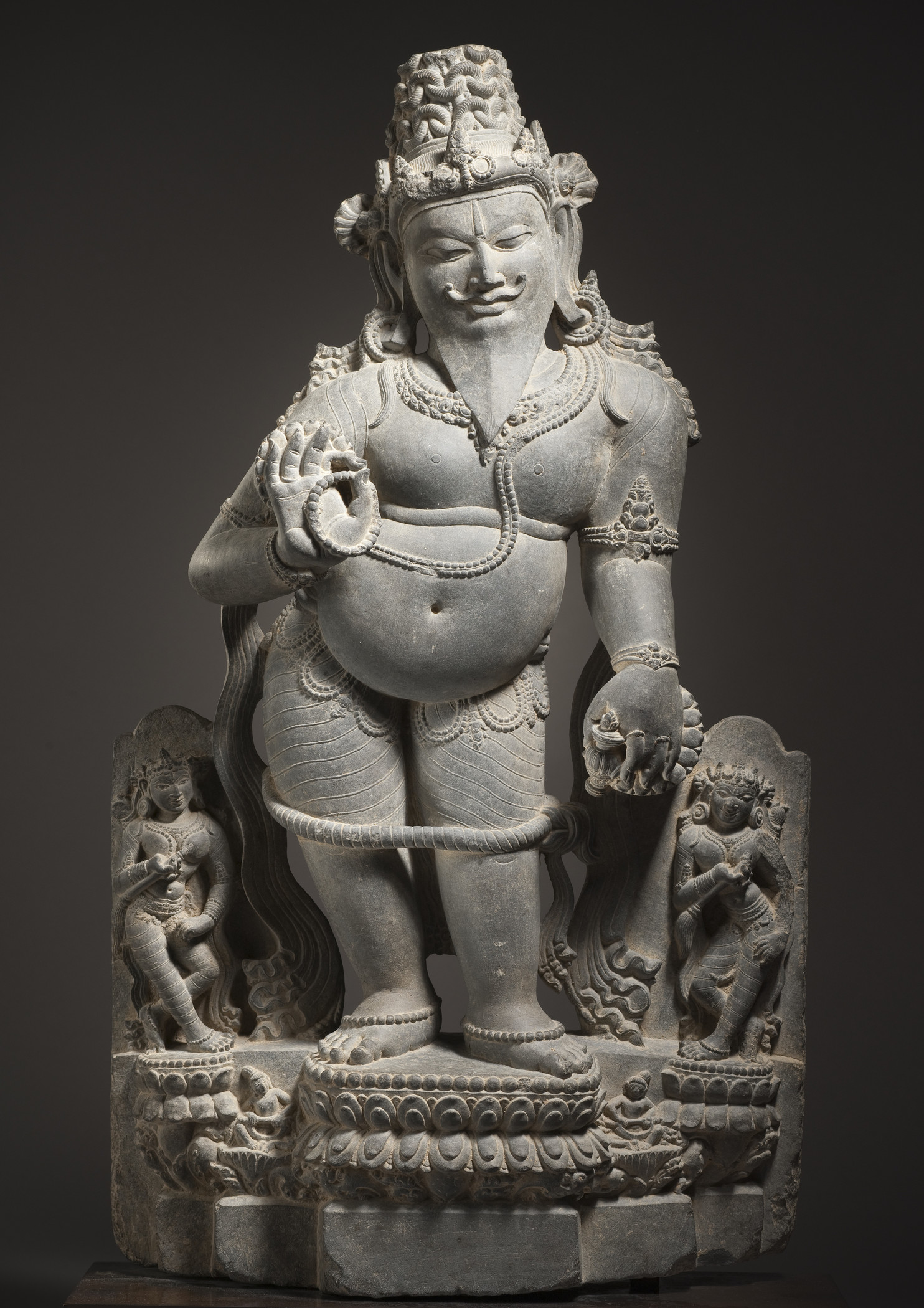
A 12th-century statue of Agastya from Bihar.

Sage Agastya is mentioned in the Hindu epic Ramayana in several chapters with his hermitage described to be on the banks of river Godavari.

In the Ramayana, Agastya and Lopamudra are described as living in Dandaka forest, on the southern slopes of Vindhya mountains. Rama praises Agastya as the one who can do what gods find impossible. He is described by Rama as the sage who asked Vindhya mountains to lower themselves so that Sun, Moon and living beings could easily pass over it. He is also described as the sage who used his Dharma powers to kill demons Vatapi and Ilwala after they had jointly misled and destroyed 9,000 men.

Agastya, according to the Ramayana, is a unique sage, who is short and heavy in build, but by living in the south he balances the powers of Shiva and the weight of Kailasha and Mount Meru. Agastya and his wife meet Rama, Sita and Lakshmana. He gives them a divine bow and arrow, describes the evil nature of Ravana and, according to William Buck, B. A. van Nooten and Shirley Triest, bids them goodbye with the advice, "Rama, demons do not love men, therefore men must love each other".

=== Mahabharata ===
The story of Agastya is mirrored in the second major Hindu epic Mahabharata. However, instead of Rama, the story is told as a conversation between Yudhishthira and Lomasa starting with section 96 of Book 3, the Vana Parva (the Book of Forest).

He is described in the epic as a sage with enormous powers of ingestion and digestion. Agastya, once again, stops the Vindhya mountains from growing and lowers them and he kills the demons Vatapi and Ilvala much the same mythical way as in the Ramayana. The Vana Parva also describes the story of Lopamudra and Agastya getting engaged and married. It also contains the mythical story of a war between Indra and Vritra, where all the demons hide in the sea, and the gods request Agastya for help; Agastya then drinks up the ocean, revealing the demons to the gods.

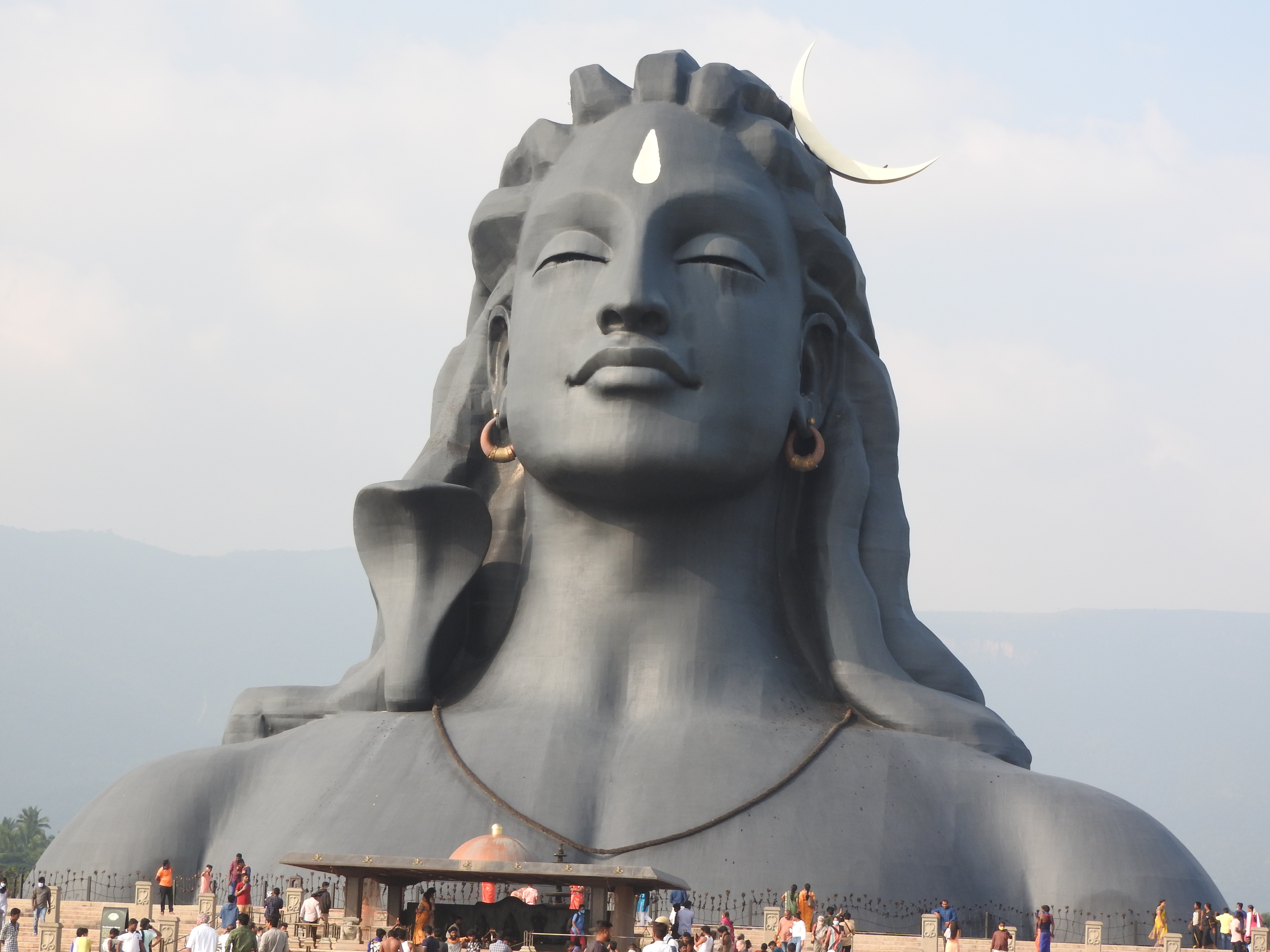
In Hinduism, Agastya is worshipped as one of the main disciples of Shiva (Adiyogi or the first yogi)

=== Puranas ===
The Puranic literature of Hinduism has numerous stories about Agastya, more elaborate, more fantastical and inconsistent than the mythologies found in Vedic and Epics literature of India. For example, chapter 61 of the Matsya Purana, chapter 22 of Padma Purana, and seven other Maha Puranas tell the entire biography of Agastya. Some list him as one of the Saptarishi (seven great rishi), while in others he is one of the eight or twelve extraordinary sages of the Hindu traditions. The names and details are not consistent across the different Puranas, nor in different manuscript versions of the same Purana. He is variously listed along with Angiras, Atri, Bhrigu, Bhargava, Bharadvaja, Visvamitra, Vasistha, Kashyapa, Gautama, Jamadagni and others.

Agastya is reverentially mentioned in the Puranas of all major Hindu traditions: Shaivism, Shaktism and Vaishnavism. Many of the Puranas include lengthy and detailed accounts of the descendants of Agastya and other Saptarishis.

=== Buddhist texts ===
Several Buddhist texts mention Agastya. Just like early Buddhist texts such as Kalapa, Katantra and Candra-vyakarana adapting Panini, and Asvaghosa adopting the more ancient Sanskrit poetic methodology as he praises the Buddha, Agastya appears in 1st millennium CE Buddhist texts. In Tamil texts, for example, Akattiyan is described as the sage who learnt Tamil and Sanskrit grammar and poetics from Avalokitan (another name for Buddha-to-be Avalokiteśvara).

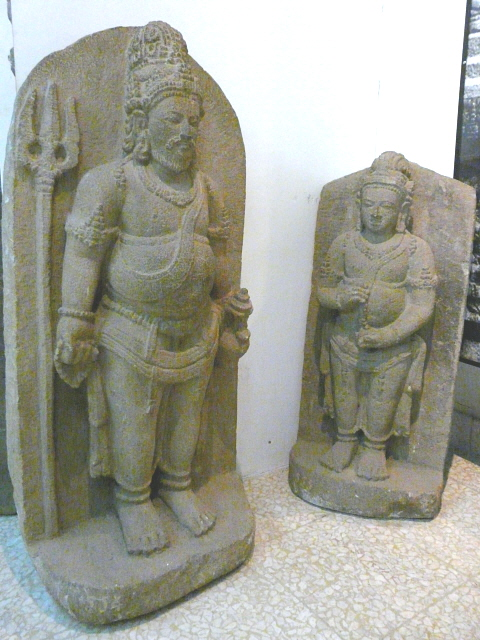
The left Indonesian statue shows Agastya with Shiva's trident, as a divine sage of Shaivism. Agastya iconography is common in southeast Asian temples.

According to Anne E. Monius, the Manimekalai and Viracoliyam are two of many South Indian texts that co-opt Agastya and make him a student of the Buddha-to-be.

Agastya elsewhere appears in other historic Buddhist mythologies, such as the Jataka tales. For example, the Buddhist text Jataka-mala by Aryasura, about the Buddha's previous lives, includes Agastya as the seventh chapter. The Agastya-Jataka story is carved as a relief in the Borobudur, the world's largest early medieval era Mahayana Buddhist temple.

=== Javanese and Indian texts ===
Agastya is one of the most important figures in several medieval-era Southeast Asian inscriptions, temple reliefs and arts.

Saiva Siddhanta was easily accepted into the Javanese society. He introduced the Vedic science and the Pallavan Grantha script, but his popularity declined when Islam started to spread throughout the islands of Indonesia. He is also found in Cambodia, Vietnam and other regions. The earliest mentions of Agastya are traceable to about the mid 1st millennium CE, but the 11th-century Javanese language text Agastya-parva is a remarkable combination of philosophy, mythology and genealogy attributed to sage Agastya.

The Agastya-parva includes Sanskrit verse (shlokas) embedded within the Javanese language. The text is structured as a conversation between a Guru (teacher, Agastya) and a Sisya (student, Agastya's son Drdhasyu). The style is a mixture of didactic, philosophical and theological treatise, covering diverse range of topics much like Hindu Puranas. The chapters of the Javanese text include the Indian theory of cyclic existence, rebirth and samsara, creation of the world by the churning of the ocean (samudra manthan), theories of the Samkhya and the Vedanta school of Hindu philosophy, major sections on god Shiva and Shaivism, some discussion of Tantra, a manual-like summary of ceremonies associated with the rites of passage and others.

While the similarities between the Agastya-parva text and classical Indian ideas are obvious, according to Jan Gonda, the Indian counterpart of this text in Sanskrit or Tamil languages have not been found in Indonesia or in India. Similarly other Agastya-related Indonesian texts, dated to be from the 10th to 12th centuries, discuss ideas from multiple sub-schools of Shaivism such as theistic Shaivasiddhanta and monistic Agamic Pashupata, and these texts declare these theologies to be of equal merit and value.

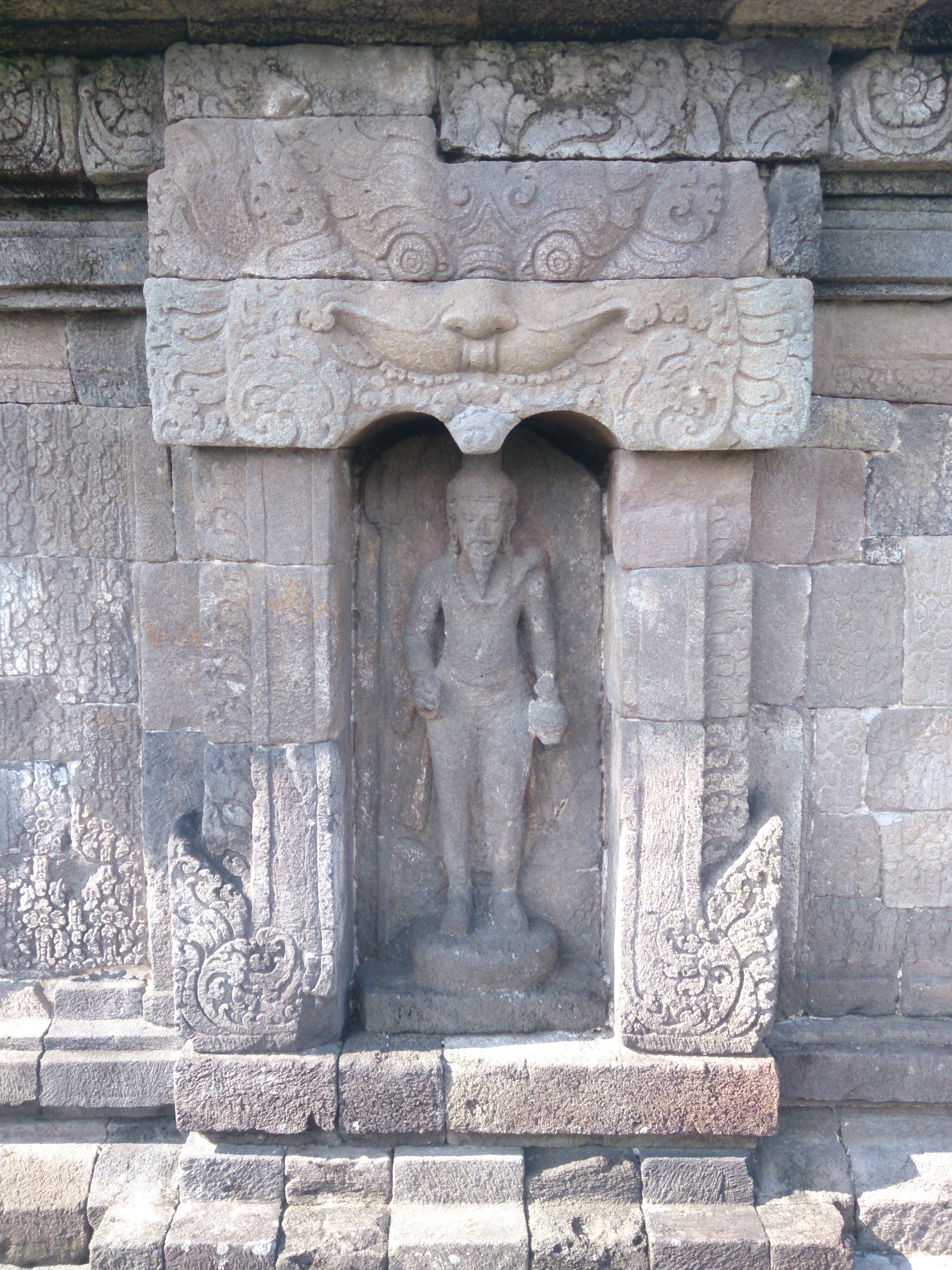
Agastya on south side of the 9th-century Javanese Sambisari temple unearthed from volcanic mud.

Agastya is common in medieval-era Shiva temples of Southeast Asia, such as the stone temples in Java (candi). Along with the iconography of Shiva, Uma, Nandi and Ganesha who face particular cardinal directions, these temples include a sculpture, image or relief of Agastya carved into the southern face. The Shiva shrine in the largest Hindu temple complex in southeast Asia, Prambanan, features four cellae in its interior. This central shrine within Prambanan group of temples dedicates its southern cella to Agastya.

The Dinoyo inscription, dated to 760 CE, is primarily dedicated to Agastya. The inscription states that his older wooden image was remade in stone, thereby suggesting that the reverence for Agastya iconography in southeast Asia was prevalent in an older period. In Cambodia, the 9th-century king Indravarman, who is remembered for sponsoring the building of a large number of historic temples and related artworks, is declared in the texts of this period to be a descendant of sage Agastya.

=== Agastya Samhita ===
Agastya Saṁhitā (literally: "Agastya's Compendium") is the title of several works in Sanskrit, attributed to Agastya.

One of those works is the Agastya Samhita, sometimes called the Sankara Samhita, a section embedded in the Skanda Purana. It was probably composed in late medieval era, but before the 12th-century. It exists in many versions, and is structured as a dialogue between Skanda and Agastya. Scholars such as Moriz Winternitz state that the authenticity of the surviving version of this document is doubtful because Shaiva celebrities such as Skanda and Agastya teach Vaishnavism ideas and the bhakti (devotional worship) of Rama, mixed in with a tourist guide about Shiva temples in Varanasi and other parts of India.

=== Agastimata ===
Agastya is attributed to be the author of Agastimata, a pre–10th-century treatise about gems and diamonds, with chapters on the origins, qualities, testing and making jewellery from them. Several other Sanskrit texts on gems and lapidary are also credited to Agastya in the Indian traditions.

=== Others ===
Other mentions of Agastya include:

- Bṛhaddevatā in section 5.134.
- The Lalita sahasranama of Shaktism tradition of Hinduism, which describes the 1000 names of the goddess Lalita is a part of the Brahmanda Purana. It is presented as a teaching from Hayagriya (an avatar of Viṣṇu) to Agastya.
- Agastya is credited as the creator of the Āditya Hṛdayam (literally, "heart of the sun"), a hymn to Sūrya he told Rama to recite, so that he may win against Ravana. Scholars such as John Muir questioned this hymn since the need for a such a hymn by Rama implies doubts about his divine nature.
- Lakshmi Stotram and Saraswati Stotram.
- The Tamil text Pattuppattu states Agastya to be master of icai (music, song).
- Kalidasa, in his Raghuvaṃśa (6.61) states that Agastya officiated the horse sacrifice of a Pandya king of Madurai.
- One of the authors of Nadi Shastra / Nadi astrology

== Legacy ==
=== Temples ===
Numerous Temples for Agastya are found in Tamil Nadu. It is said that he installed nearly 300+ temples all of which carry the name Agasteewararar. Chennai Agastheeswarar temple in Chrompet Agastheeswarar temple in Pammal Agastheeswarar temple in Villivakkam Agastheeswarar temple in Kolapakkam Agastheeswarar temple in Nungambakkam

Thirunelveli District,

- A temple for Agastyar on top of Agastya Mala
- Agastheeswarar temple in Ambasamudram
- Agastheeswarar temple in Kallidaikurichi
- Sri Agasthiyar Temple at Agasthiyar Falls (Kalyana Theertham) in Papanasam

In Madurai District,

- Sri Lobamudra Samedha Agasthiyar Temple in the Arulmigu Chidambara Vinayagar Thirukoil at Vellalapatti (7 km from Alagarkovil).

Agastya statues or reliefs feature in numerous early medieval temples of north India, south India and Southeast Asia. One famous Agastya temple is also located in Uttarakhand in the town of Agastyamuni. The town derived its name from the name of Sage Agastya. The Dasavatara temple in Deogarh (Uttar Pradesh, near Madhya Pradesh border) features a 6th-century Gupta Empire era Agastya carving. In Karnataka similarly, he is reverentially shown in several 7th-century temples such as the Mallikarjuna temple in Mahakuta and the Parvati temple in Sandur. He is a part of many Chalukya era Shaivism temples in the Indian subcontinent peninsula.

The artistic iconography of South Asian and Southeast Asian temples show common themes such as he holding a pitcher, but also differences. For example, Agastya is featured inside or outside of the temple walls and sometimes as a guardian at the entrance (dvarapala), with or without a potbelly, with or without a receding hairline, with or without a dagger and sword. Rock cut temples and caves, such as the 8th-century Pandya rock temples group, show Agastya.

=== Literature ===
The shrine to Agastya at the Pothigai hill source of the river is mentioned in both Ilango Adigal's Tamil epics Cilappatikaram and Chithalai Chathanar's Manimekalai.

Similarly, the Sanskrit plays Anargharāghava and Rajasekhara's Bālarāmāyaṇa of the 9th century refer to a shrine of Agastya on or near Adam's Peak (Sri Pada), the tallest mountain in Sri Lanka (ancient Tamraparni), from whence the river Gona Nadi/Kala Oya flows into the Gulf of Mannar's Puttalam Lagoon.

=== Martial arts ===
Agastya is regarded as the founder of Silambam, an Indian martial art from Tamil Nadu, and varmam, an ancient science of healing using varmam points for varied diseases which is also utilized by practitioners of the southern form of Kalaripayattu, an Indian martial art from Tamilakam. Murugan, the son of Shiva, is said to have taught varmam to Agastya, who then wrote treatises on it and passed it on to other siddhar.

== In popular culture ==
In 2026, Agastya was portrayed by Mukesh Tiwari in the film, Ramayana: Part 1.

== See also ==
- Siddhars
- Tirumular
- Tamil Thai
