= Iraiyanar Akapporul =

Early mediaeval work on Tamil poetics

- Author: Iraiyanar
- Publication date: 400 CE

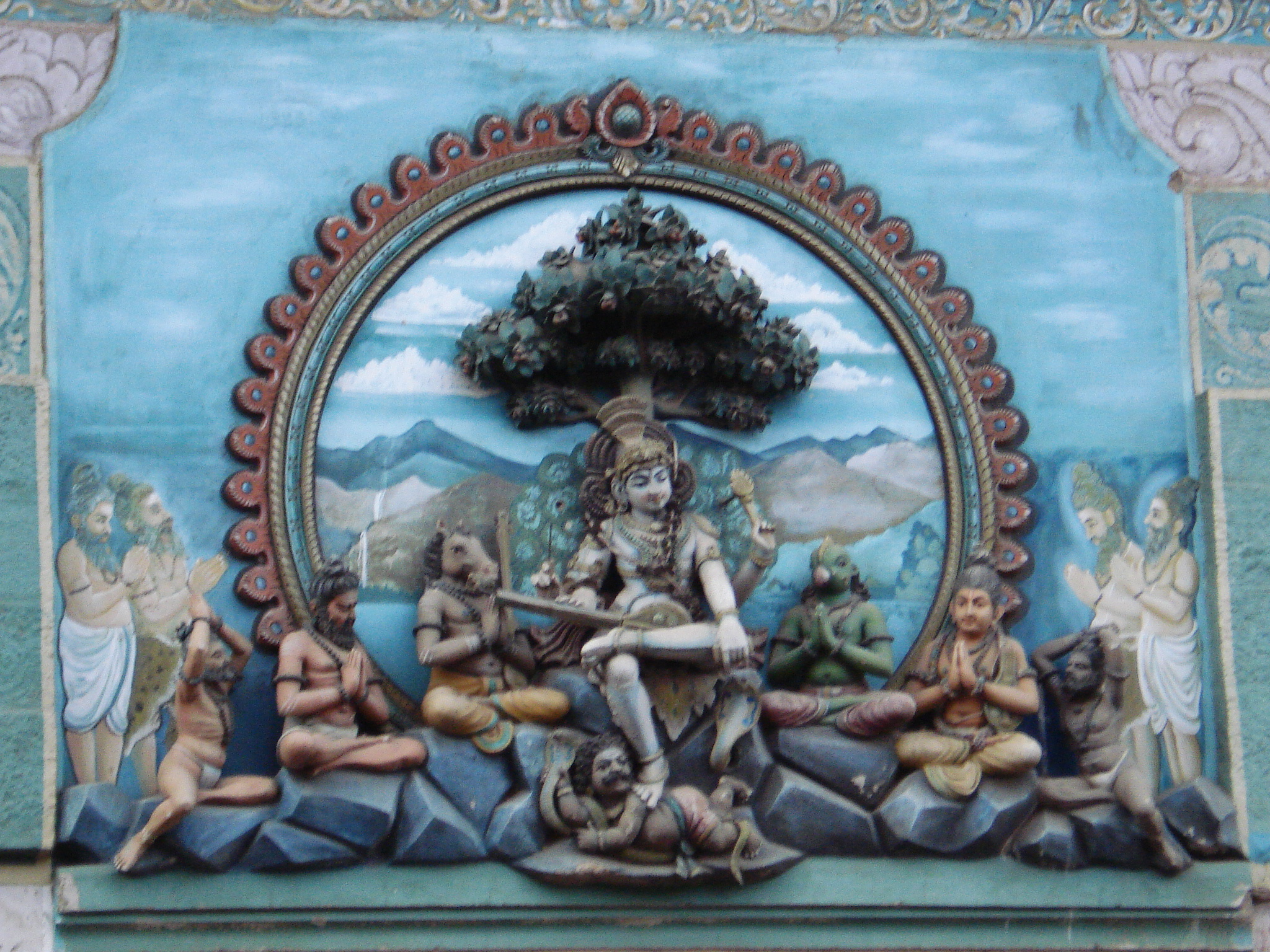
Tamil legends say that the sixty verses that form the core of the Iraiyanar Akapporul were discovered beneath the altar of Chokkanathar in Madurai

Iraiyaṉār Akapporuḷ, or Kaḷaviyal eṉṟa Iraiyaṉār Akapporuḷ, literally "Iraiyanar's treatise on the love-theme, called 'The study of stolen love'" (Tamil: களவியல் என்ற இறையனார் அகப்பொருள்) is an early mediaeval work on Tamil poetics, specifically, on the literary conventions associated with the akam tradition of Tamil love poetry. The date of the work is uncertain, but it is generally taken to have been composed between the fifth and eighth centuries.

The Akapporul consists of a set of sixty nūṟpās – terse epigrams written in verse which codify rules – attributed to Iraiyanar. The received text of the accompanied by a long prose treatise on akam poetics attributed to Nakkiraṉār, which is structured as a commentary on the nūṟpās, but significantly expands on them and introduces several new ideas. The work as a whole occupies an important place in the history of Tamil literature for several reasons. The poetical argument of the work, and in particular Nakkiranar's treatment of traditional love episodes as successive scenes in an unfolding drama, was extremely influential in the development of Tamil love poetry and poetics in the medieval and pre-colonial periods. Secondly. Nakkiranar's treatise is both the first major Tamil work to be written entirely in prose, and the first erudite textual commentary in Tamil, and as such stylistically shaped the development of the Tamil prose and commentarial traditions. Finally, the work also contains the oldest account of the Sangam legend, which has played a significant role in modern Tamil consciousness.

== Layers, authorship and dating ==
The Iraiyanar Akapporul in its present form is a composite work, containing three distinct texts with different authors. These are sixty nūṟpās which constitute the core of the original Iraiyanar Akapporul, a long prose commentary on the nūṟpās, and a set of poems called the Pāṇṭikkōvai which are embedded within the commentary.

=== The nūṟpās ===
The original Iraiyanar Akapporul consisted of sixty brief verses – called nūṟpās – that, in total, contain 149 lines. The verses show a number of similarities with the poruḷatikāram section of the Tolkappiyam – an older manual on Tamil grammar, poetics and prosody – both in its vocabulary and the core concepts it discusses. Takahashi suggests that this work was originally composed as a practical handbook for writing love poetry in accordance with the conventions of the akam tradition. The intent behind its composition, according to him, was to produce something that was more accessible and useful to poets than existing theoretical works on poetics, such as the poruḷatikāram.

The author of the sixty verses is unknown. Nakkiranar's commentary states that the verses were found inscribed on three copper plates under the altar to Shiva in Madurai, in the time of the Pandiyan king Ukkiraperuvaluti, who is also mentioned in the Akananuru as being the king who ordered its compilation. Nakkiranar says their author was Shiva himself, "the flame-hued lord of Alavayil in Madurai". Later sources, such as Ilampuranar's commentary on the Tolkappiyam, name the author of the sixty nūṟpās as "Iraiyanar", which literally means "lord", but is also a common name of Shiva. Apart from this legend, there is no tradition or concrete evidence as to who their human author was. Zvelebil and Marr suggest that the author was a poet or grammarian, possibly called Iraiyanar, and that the text itself had probably been stored in the temple at Madurai under Shiva's altar, where it was rediscovered in the time of Ukkiraperuvaluti. A poem in the Sangam anthology Kuruntokai is also attributed to Iraiyanar, and Marr goes on to suggest that the author of the nūṟpās may have been the same person as the author of that poem.

The verses are also difficult to date. The commentary says that they were composed in the Sangam period, but the scholarly consensus is that they are from a later date. Takahashi and Zvelebil assign them to a period between the fifth and sixth centuries, on the basis that their relationship to the poruḷatikāram suggests that they were composed a few generations after the final redaction of the poruḷatikāram, which they date to the 4th–5th centuries. Marr takes the view that the similarities between the nūṟpās and the poruḷatikāram indicate that the two were broadly contemporaneous, and drew upon common poetic ideas and definitions.

=== Nakkiranar's commentary ===
The second component of the work is Nakkiranar's treatise on love poetics which, although structured as a commentary, is treated by modern scholars as an erudite work in its own right. It is several times the length of the verses themselves, running to over two hundred pages in Tamil. The treatise is written in the tone and style of a discourse of the type that might be heard at a literary academy. The commentary uses a number of rhetorical devices. Nakkiranar repeatedly poses hypothetical questions and objections, to which he presents answers and rebuttals which are directly addressed to the reader, as if the reader himself was the questioner. He also uses stories, anecdotes and legends to illustrate specific points, and draws extensively on the then-existing corpus of Tamil akam poetry to provide examples of the poetical techniques he discusses.

The commentary says that it was written by Nakkiranar, son of Kanakkayanar. A number of traditions connect Nakkiranar with the Sangam age. The commentary itself claims to have been written in the Sangam age, and names Nakkiranar as one of the poets of the Third Sangam. Later legends recorded in the Tiruvilayadarpuranam say he was the president of the Third Sangam, and there are extant Sangam poems attributed to a poet by that name. The scholarly consensus, however, is that the commentary was written some centuries after the end of the Sangam period, on the basis that its language differs significantly in structure and vocabulary from that of Sangam literature, and that it cites verses which use a metre – kattalaikkalitturai – not found in Sangam literature. Zvelebil suggests that the Nakkiranar who wrote this commentary may be the same as the composer of the Tirumurukarruppatai.

The commentary records that it was transmitted orally for eight generations, until it was finally committed to writing by Nilakantanar of Musiri, a tradition which Zvelebil and Marr find credible. Early scholars, such as S. Vaiyapuri Pillai, dated the commentary to a period as late as the 10th–12th century, on the basis that the author appeared to be familiar with the 10th-century Civakacintamani. Modern scholars, however, tend to view these as later interpolations into the text, and date the commentary itself to a period closer to the 8th century on the basis of its relationship with the Pāṇṭikkōvai. Zvelebil suggests that many of these may have been inserted by Nilakantanar of Musiri, who he suggests added an introduction and more modern quotations into the text when he wrote it down.

=== The Pāṇṭikkōvai ===
The third component of the text is the Pāṇṭikkōvai, a work containing a series of related akam poems about the seventh century Pandiyan king, Nedumaran. Nakkiranar's commentary uses a number of verses from this poem to illustrate points he makes concerning the poetics of Tamil akam poetry – of the 379 quotations in the commentary, all but 50 are from the Pāṇṭikkōvai. The Pāṇṭikkōvai is believed to have had 400 quatrains in its original form, 329 of which are preserved in Nakkiranar's commentary. The author of the Pāṇṭikkōvai is unknown; however, the poem is interesting in itself as one of the earliest literary works written in the form of a kōvai – a series of interlinked poems which became one of the mainstays of akam poetry in mediaeval Tamil literature.

=== Modern editions and translations ===
The text of the Akapporul is almost always printed together with the commentary of Nakkiranar, and the two are usually treated as a unity.

The Akapporul was transmitted for several centuries in the form palm-leaf manuscripts. The first printed edition was prepared by Damodaram Pillai in 1883. The first critical edition, based on a comparison of all manuscript copies that were then available, was prepared in 1939 by K.V. Govindaraja Mudaliyar and M.V. Venugopala Pillai. A second critical edition, which took into account a few additional manuscripts that came to light subsequently, was published by the Saiva Siddhantha Works Publishing Society in 1969.

An English translation of the nūṟpās and commentary was published by Buck and Paramasivan in 1997. Eva Wilden, Jean-Luc Chevillard, Thomas Lehmann and Takanobu Takahashi, published their translation as An annotated translation of Kalaviyal ,alias Iraiyanar Akapporul in 2003.

In 2012 Ir̲aiyan̲ār Akapporuḷ : Text, Transliteration and Translations in English Verse and Prose was edit by V. Ramasamy was published by the Central Institute of Classical Tamil in Chennai.

== Content ==
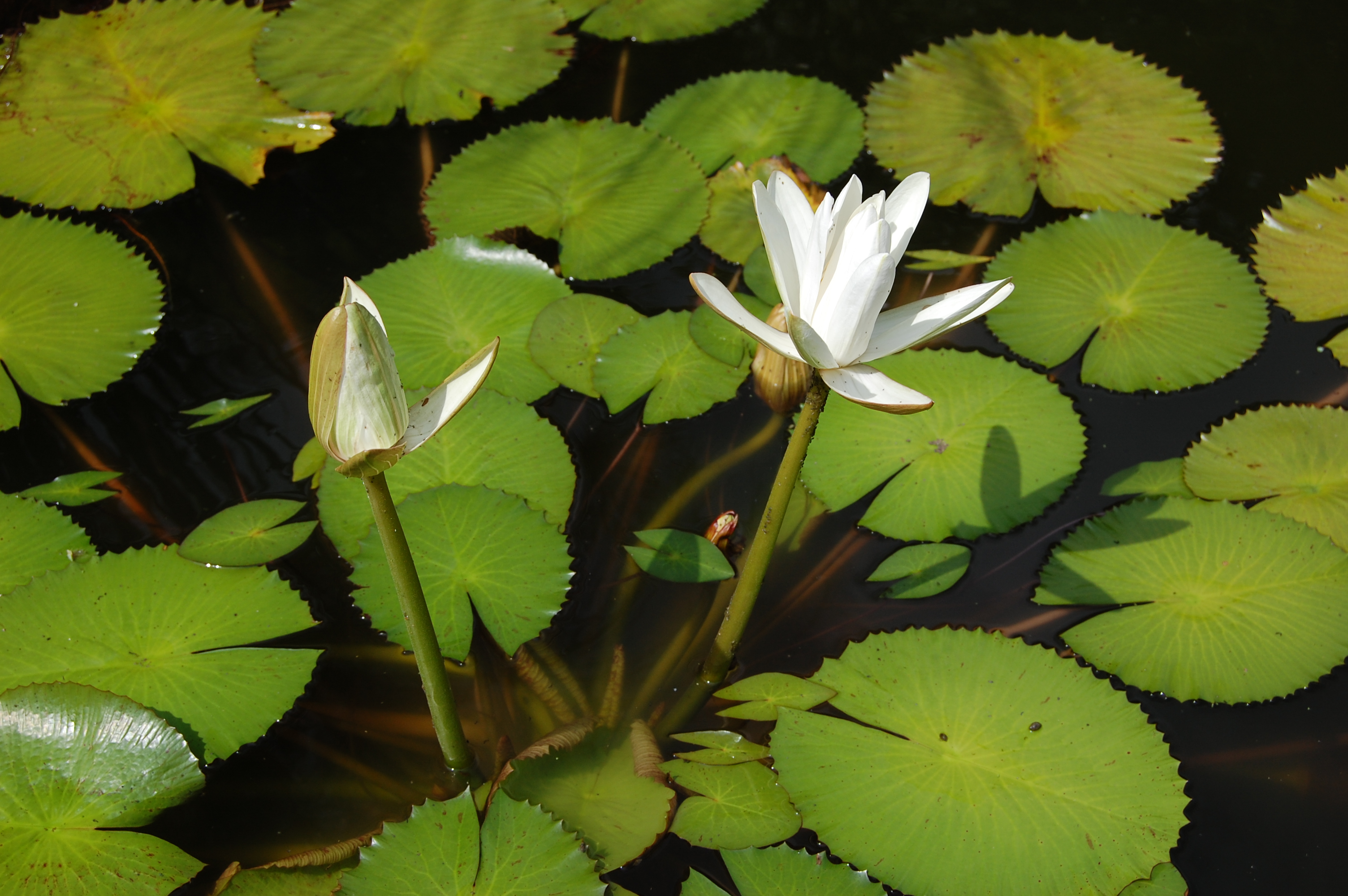
The neytal theme – named for the white Indian waterlily, which symbolises the theme's content – deals with the sorrow of lovers due to separation

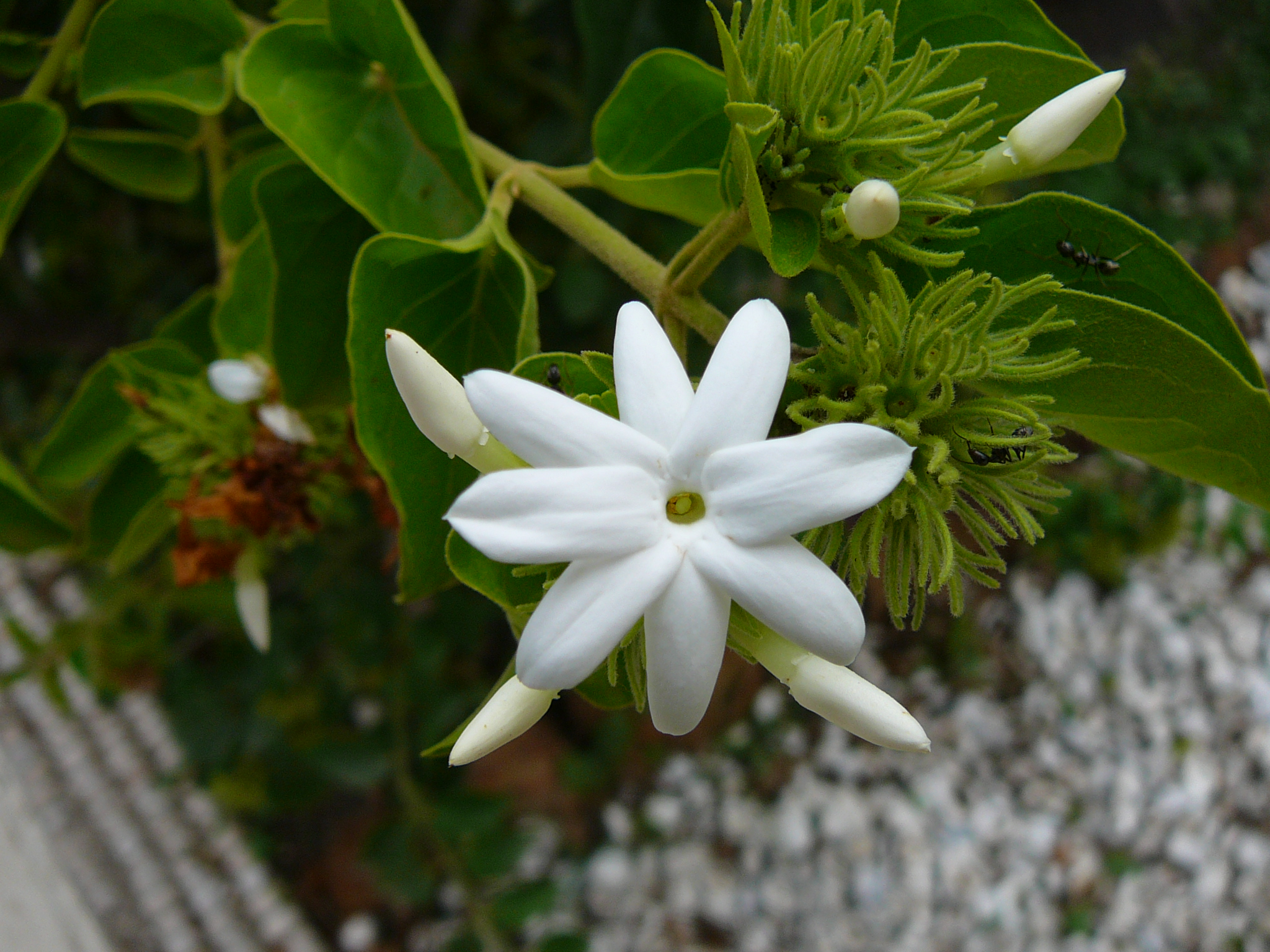
The mullai theme – named for the jasmine flower – deals with the endurance of a lover waiting for the return of her beloved

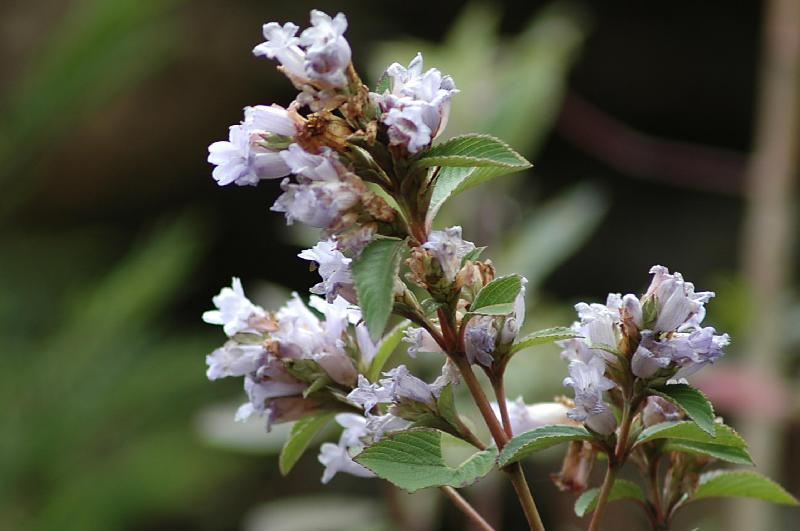
The kurinci theme – named for Strobilanthes kunthiana – deals with the clandestine union of lovers

The marutam theme
Place	Agricultural tract, riverside town
Phase	Lovers' quarrels
Time	Hour before daybreak
Season	All six seasons
Flower	Marutam (Queen's flower), lotus, red waterlily
God	Ventan
Food	Red rice, white rice
Animals	Water buffalo, otter
Trees	Willow, queen's flower
Birds	Waterfowl, heron
Drums	Wedding-drum, harvest-drum
Activities	Harvesting, threshing and wedding rice
Music	Marutam pann
Water	Household wells, reservoirs

Iraiyanar Akapporul is concerned with setting out the literary conventions that govern Tamil love poetry of the akam tradition. The conventions, as such, are taken from the poetics of the Sangam period. Thus a poem is a poetical snapshot of one instant in a relationship. This snapshot provides a glimpse into the lives of the couple which is in love. In addition, each poem must consist of actual words spoken by one of the persons involved in the relationship, without any commentary by an omniscient narrator. Only certain characters may speak – the hero (talaivaṉ) and heroine (talaivi), a close male friend of the hero (tōḻaṉ) or a close female friend of the heroine (tōḻi), a mother or foster-mother, priests, courtesans, bards who mediate between a wife and husband, and a few other characters. The words spoken must also be addressed to a listener – the conventions of akam poetry did not permit soliloquies. However, the listener need not necessarily be the person to whom the words are seemingly addressed. A common device in akam poetry is to have words seemingly spoken to a friend, but actually intended for the speaker's lover, who the speaker knows is eavesdropping.

The content of the poems is highly conventionalised. Each poem must belong to one of five tiṇais, poetical modes or themes. Each mode consists of a complete poetical landscape – a definite time, place, season in which the poem is set – and background elements characteristic of that landscape – including flora and fauna, inhabitants, deities and social organisation – that provide imagery for poetic metaphors. The modes are associated with specific aspects of relationships, such as the first meeting, separation, quarrelling, pining and waiting. Each mode is named for the chief flower in the landscape with which it is associated. The table to the left gives an example of the various elements which the text associates with the mode marutam.

In Sangam literature, the composition of such a poem describing an instant in a relationship was an end in itself. In the Iraiyanar Akapporul, however, its purpose is more complex. Each poem is an instant in a developing relationship, and is ordinarily preceded and followed by other poems that describe preceding and succeeding instants in the same relationship. The instants described by each poem must, therefore, also develop the plot, and the character of the persons who are the subject of the work. Thus the Iraiyanar Akapporul discusses the importance of the essential characteristics of the hero and heroine, and the tension between each of these characteristics and the love and desire of the couple for each other. Each of the moments described in successive poems, set in an appropriate tiṇai, moves this along, by describing how the couple react to each other in the context of specific situations.

The text divides the evolution of a relationship into two phases, the phase of kaḷavu or "stolen" love, and the phase of kaṟpu or "chaste" love. Love is considered to be "stolen" before marriage, and "chaste" after marriage. A number of situations can occur within each phase. Within the phase of "stolen" love, for instance, situations that may exist include a night-time tryst (iravukkuṟi), a daytime tryst (pakaṟkuṟi), the friend urging the hero to marry the heroine (varaivu vēṭkai), the hero temporarily leaving the heroine to avoid gossip (oruvaḻittaṇattal), and so on. Similarly, within the phase of "chaste" love, situations that may arise include the newly-wed phase (kaṭimaṉai), the necessity to discharge duties (viṉai muṟṟal), separation so that the hero can earn money (poruṭpiṇi pirivu), and so on. Later texts, such as Akapporul Vilakkam, discuss a third intermediate phase, that of the marriage itself, but Iraiyanar Akapporul does not treat this as being a separate phase, though it does deal with some of the situations that later texts classify under the phase of marriage. In his commentary on Iraiyanar's penultimate verse, Nakkiranar explains in detail how, by carefully choosing the situations, speakers and tiṇais, a series of episodes can be woven into a seamless narrative detailing the history of a relationship.

== Context and influence ==
=== Poetical context ===
The treatise contains the oldest full-length exposition of poetical devices central to akam poetry, including the five tiṇais or landscapes into which all love poems were classified, and the various kuṟṟus or speakers whose emotions and expression the poems sought to articulate. However, its principal purpose was not to clarify or explain the ancient akam tradition.

At the time the work was written, a new class of work – called ciṟṟilakkiyam, or "short literature" – was emerging in Tamil literature. Unlike the old akam tradition, which mainly focused on short poems dealing with a single, detached scene in the life of a pair of lovers, these works sought to depict a complete story. This was not in itself alien to Tamil literature, in that epics – peruṅkāppiyam in Tamil – such as the Cilappatikaram dealt with whole stories. Works of the ciṟṟilakkiyam tradition, however, sought to do so on a less grand scale, through longer series of related poems which described successive episodes that cumulatively chart the entire course of a relationship.

It is in relation to these that the text had its longest-lasting impact. By chronologically ordering the isolated moments which Tamil akam poetry, and describing how they fit into a serialised plot, the text – and in particular, Nakkiranar's commentary – related the emergent ciṟṟilakkiyam tradition to the ancient akam tradition, and thereby helped create a new approach to literature, on the basis on which a plethora of new literary forms developed in succeeding centuries. The kovai, in particular, came to dominate secular and religious akam poetry in the mediaeval period. The very last example of akam poetry, written before the tradition was suppressed by seventeenth century religious revivalism, is a 600-verse kōvai, composed by Kachchaiyappar Sivachariyar and embedded into his Tanikaippuranam.

=== Stylistic influences ===
Nakkiranar's commentary also created a basic template which all subsequent commentaries on Tamil texts followed. Each verse of the original text is followed by a commentary on that verse, which explains its content, and presents examples chosen from extant literature and where necessary quotes previous authors in support of the commentator's claims. Nakkiranar, for example, frequently quotes rules from the Tolkappiyam, Akattiyam and other works on grammar and poetics to support his literary theories, and illustrates these theories by quoting from the Pāṇṭikkōvai, Cilappatikaram and poetry of the Sangam age, weaving all these into his prose commentary in a manner that highlights his points. In addition, the comments on the initial verses, and on the final one, present additional material dealing with general themes, which goes beyond a simple elucidation of the verses on which they comment. Thus Nakkiranar, in addition to simply commenting on Iraiyanar's verses, here outlines rules for the structure and content of a commentary, discusses the manner in which conventions regarding love-poetry should be presented, and sets out general observations on history.

=== Historical and social context ===
The work, and in particular the commentary of Nakkiranar, reinterprets the Tamil akam tradition in the light of the Shaivite bhakti tradition, which was then sweeping through Tamil Nadu in a wave of Hindu revivalism. A commentary, in the Indian tradition, plays an important role in reinterpreting and reworking the applicability of a text or tradition in the context of changing historical or social circumstances. Nakkiranar's commentary thus plays the role of reclaiming the Tamil akam tradition – secular in appearance, and associated with Jainism – for the Tamil Shaivite tradition. This reappropriation had a significant effect on the Tamil bhakti tradition, whose poems, from the ninth century onwards, make extensive use of the conventions of the akam tradition, but in the context of describing the love of a devotee for God.

== See also ==
- Commentaries in Tamil literary tradition

== Sources ==
- Buck, David C.; Paramasivam, K. (1997), The Study of Stolen Love: A translation of Kalaviyal enra Iraiyanar Akapporul with Commentary by Nakkiranar, Atlanta: Scholars Press, ISBN 0-7885-0331-6
- Marr, John Ralston (1985), The Eight Anthologies, Madras: Institute of Asian Studies
- Monius, Anne (2000), "The many lives of Dandin: The Kavyadarsha in Sanskrit and Tamil", International Journal of Hindu Studies, 4 (1): 1–37, doi:10.1007/s11407-000-0001-x, S2CID 140492963
- Sivaraja Pillai, K. N. (1932), The Chronology of the Early Tamils, based on the synchronistic tables of their kings, chieftains and poets appearing in the Sangam literature, Madras: University of Madras
- Shulman, David (2005), Subrahmanyam, Sanjay (ed.), "A Review Symposium: Literary Cultures in History", Indian Economic and Social History Review, 42 (3): 377–408, doi:10.1177/001946460504200304, S2CID 220783784
- Takahashi, Takanobu (1995), Tamil Love Poetry and Poetics, Leiden: E. J. Brill, ISBN 90-04-09352-4
- Yocum, Glenn E. (1973), "Shrines, Shamanism, and Love Poetry: Elements in the Emergence of Popular Tamil Bhakti", Journal of the American Academy of Religion, 41 (1): 3–17, doi:10.1093/jaarel/XLI.1.3
- Zvelebil, Kamil (1973a), "The Earliest Account of the Tamil Academies", Indo-Iranian Journal, 15 (2): 109–135, doi:10.1007/BF00157289, S2CID 189777598
- Zvelebil, Kamil (1973b), The Smile of Murugan: On Tamil Literature of South India, Leiden: E. J. Brill, ISBN 90-04-03591-5
