= Thaniyamangalam =

Neighbourhood in Madurai district, Tamil Nadu, India

- village
- Location in Tamil Nadu, India Thaniyamangalam (India)
- Coordinates: 10°01′37.11″N 78°24′52.85″E
- Country: India
- State: Tamil Nadu
- District: Madurai

Government
  - Panchayat President: Mr. Kumar

Population (2001)
  - Total: 3,748

Languages
  - Official: Tamil
- Time zone: UTC+5:30 (IST)
- PIN: 625109
- Telephone code: 91 452
- Vehicle registration: TN 59

Thaniyamangalam is a village in the Melur taluk of Madurai district, Tamil Nadu, India. The sand is reddish due to rich iron.

== Demographics ==
Panchayat of Thaniyamangalam includes Bharathi nagar, Thethampatti, Perumalpatti and Muthuramalingampatti. As per the 2001 census, Thaniyamangalam had a total population of 3,748 with 1,757 males and 1,991 females. The literacy rate was 75.81. Agriculture is the major occupation (Paddy, Sugarcane, Banana). Later they fell into the trend of going to Gulf countries to earn.

More number of civil engineers located in this village and 90% of engineers are working in Middle east currently. Recently the people who are living there initiated the term RESHAPE THANIYAMANAGALAM and this is mainly for the development of village which includes CCTV cameras, planting trees, providing facilities by collecting funds.

== Study Centres ==
The village has a Government Primary School, Government Higher Secondary School and few Nursery Schools providing education for the children from in and around the village.
