= Ādityahṛdayam =

Sanskrit devotional hymn

Surya, Sun God to whom the hymn is dedicated

Ādityahṛdayam (Sanskrit: आदित्यहृदयम्, Sanskrit pronunciation: [aːdɪtjɐɦɽɪdɐjɐm]) is a Hindu devotional hymn, dedicated to Āditya or Sūrya (the Sun God), found in the Yuddha Kānda (6.105) of Vālmīki's Rāmāyana. It was recited by the sage Agastya to Rāma in the battlefield before fighting with the Rakshasa king Rāvaṇa. In it, Agastya teaches Rāma the procedure of worshiping Āditya for strength to defeat the enemy.

== Etymology ==
Āditya (Sanskrit: आदित्य, lit. "son of Aditi") refers to the Sun. Hṛdayam (Sanskrit: हृदयम्) is the Sanskrit word for "heart".

== Structure ==
The Ādityahṛdayam is made up of thirty ślokas which can be divided into six sections:

| 1–2 | Agastya Rishi approaches Rāma. |
| 3–5 | Agastya Rishi states the greatness of the Ādityahṛidayam and advantages of reciting it. |
| 6–15 | A description of Āditya as the embodiment of all gods as well as nourisher, sustainer, and giver of heat. |
| 16–20 | Mantra japa. |
| 21–24 | Salutations to Āditya. |
| 25–30 | A description of the results of this prayer, the method of recital, and the procedure followed by Rāma to successfully invoke Āditya to bless him with the requisite strength for the victory on the battlefield. |

== See also ==
- Gayatri Mantra
