= Sambisari =

Hindu temple in Central Java, Indonesia

Coordinates: 7.7625°S 110.4469°E

Sambisari ꦱꦩ꧀ꦧꦶꦱꦫꦶ
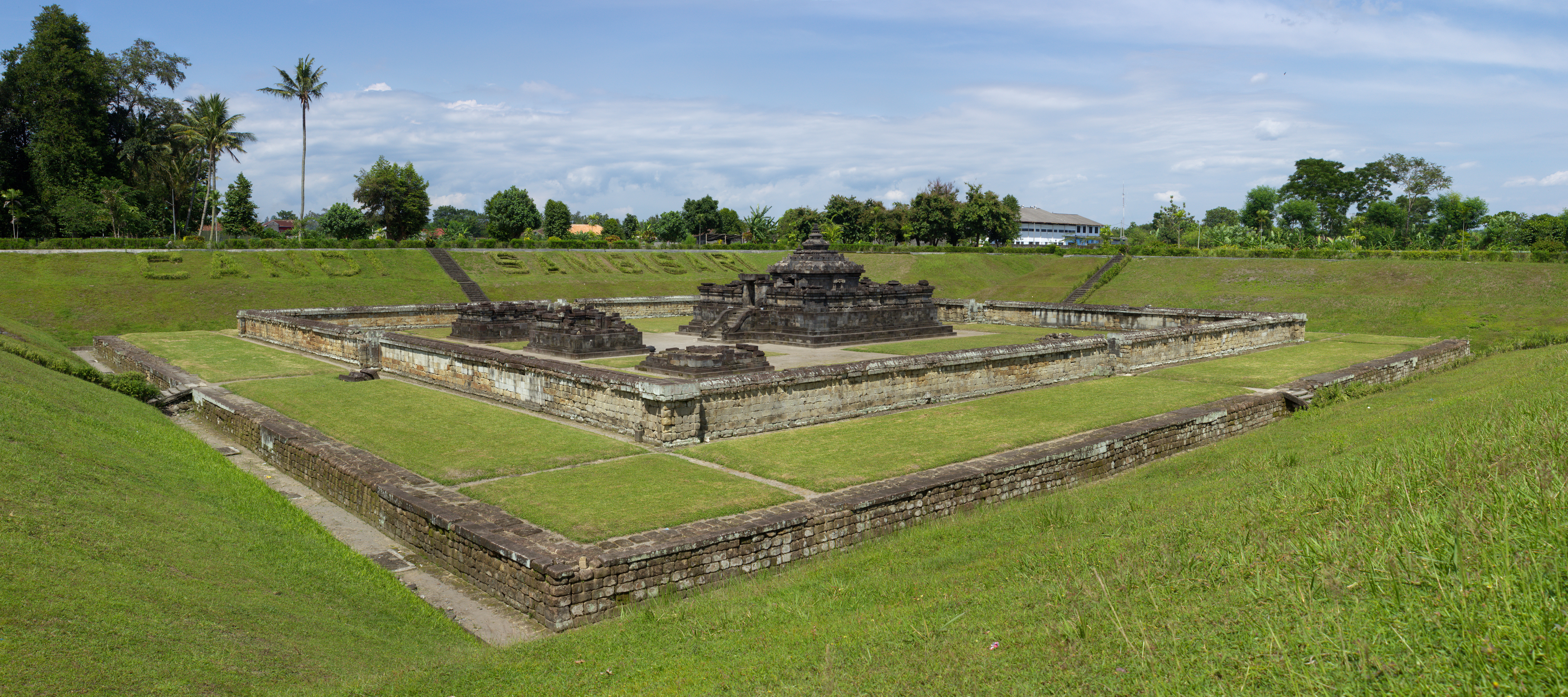
- The Sambisari temple excavated area
- Interactive map of Sambisari ꦱꦩ꧀ꦧꦶꦱꦫꦶ
- Location: Sleman Regency, Yogyakarta Special Region, Indonesia

Sambisari (Javanese: ꦱꦩ꧀ꦧꦶꦱꦫꦶ) is a 9th-century Hindu temple located at Sambisari hamlet, Purwomartani, Kalasan, Sleman Regency, Special Region of Yogyakarta, Indonesia. The temple was buried about five metres underground. Parts of the original temple have been excavated. The temple is located about 8 kilometres (5.0 mi) east of Yogyakarta near Adisucipto Airport.

== Discovery ==
The temple emerged in July 1966 by a farmer when working on land that belongs to Karyowinangun. His hoe hit the carved stone which was a part of the buried temple ruins. The news of the discovery reached the Archaeology office in Prambanan and the area was secured. The excavation and reconstruction works were completed in March 1987. The temple is thought to have been buried by an eruption of volcanic ash from the nearby Mount Merapi.

The discovery of the Sambisari temple probably was the most exciting archaeological finding in Yogyakarta in recent years, leading to speculation about whether there are other ancient temples still underground in the vicinity, buried under Mount Merapi volcanic ash.

== History ==
Based on architectural and ornamental similarities to another Hindu temple in Indonesia, Prambanan, the presence of Hindu statues around the temple walls, and the lingga-yoni inside the main temple, historians have concluded that Sambisari was a Shivaite Hindu temple built around the first or second decade of the 9th century (circa 812-838). This conclusion was supported by the findings of a gold plate in the vicinity engraved with letters that according to paleography were used in early 9th century ancient Java.

According to Wanua Tengah inscription III dated 908 contains the name of kings that ruled Mataram kingdom, the temple was probably built during the reign of Rakai Garung (ruled 828-846). However, historians also consider that the construction of a temple was not always issued by a king. Lesser nobles might have also ordered and funded the construction.

== Architecture ==
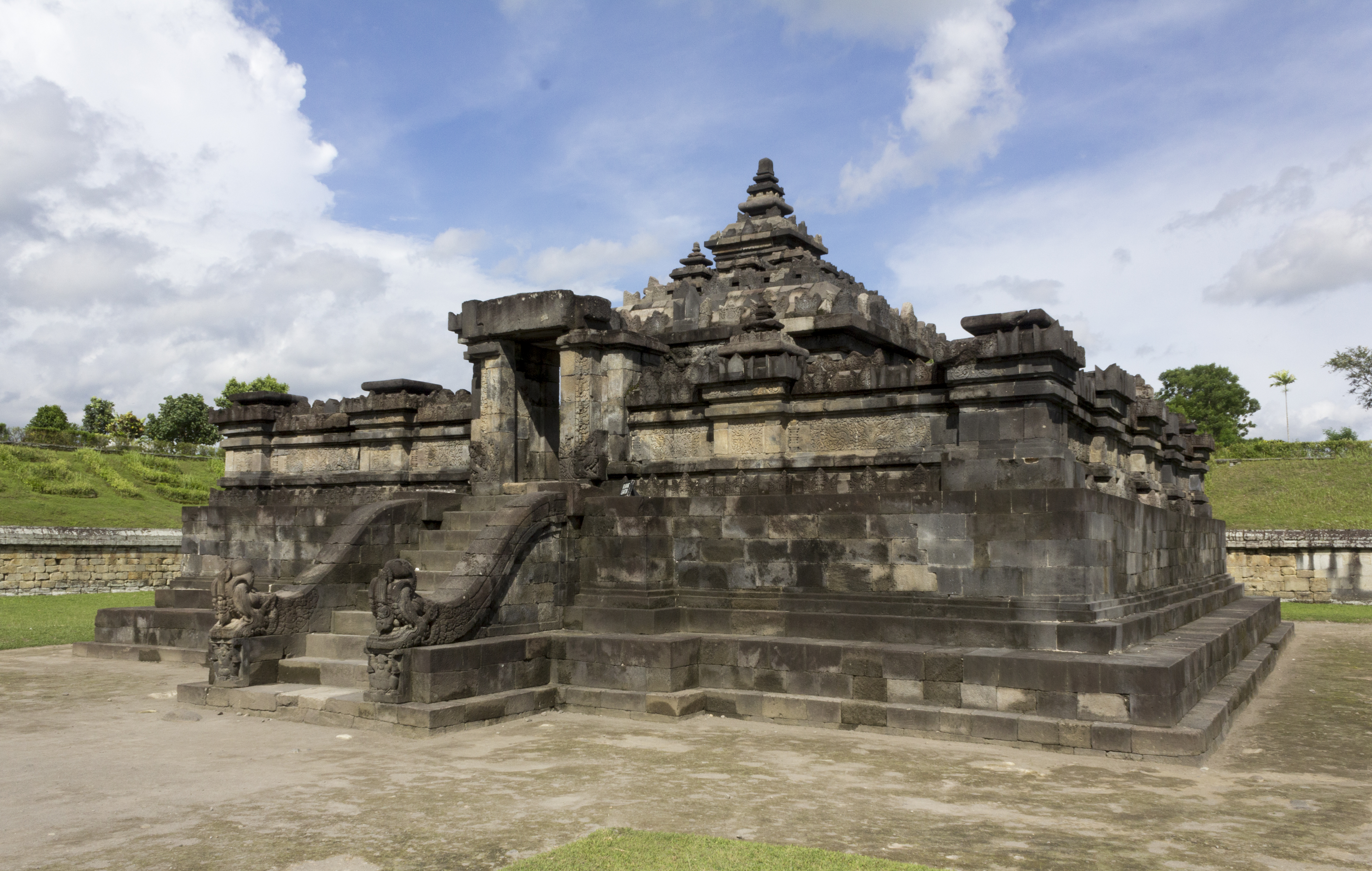
The main temple of Sambisari

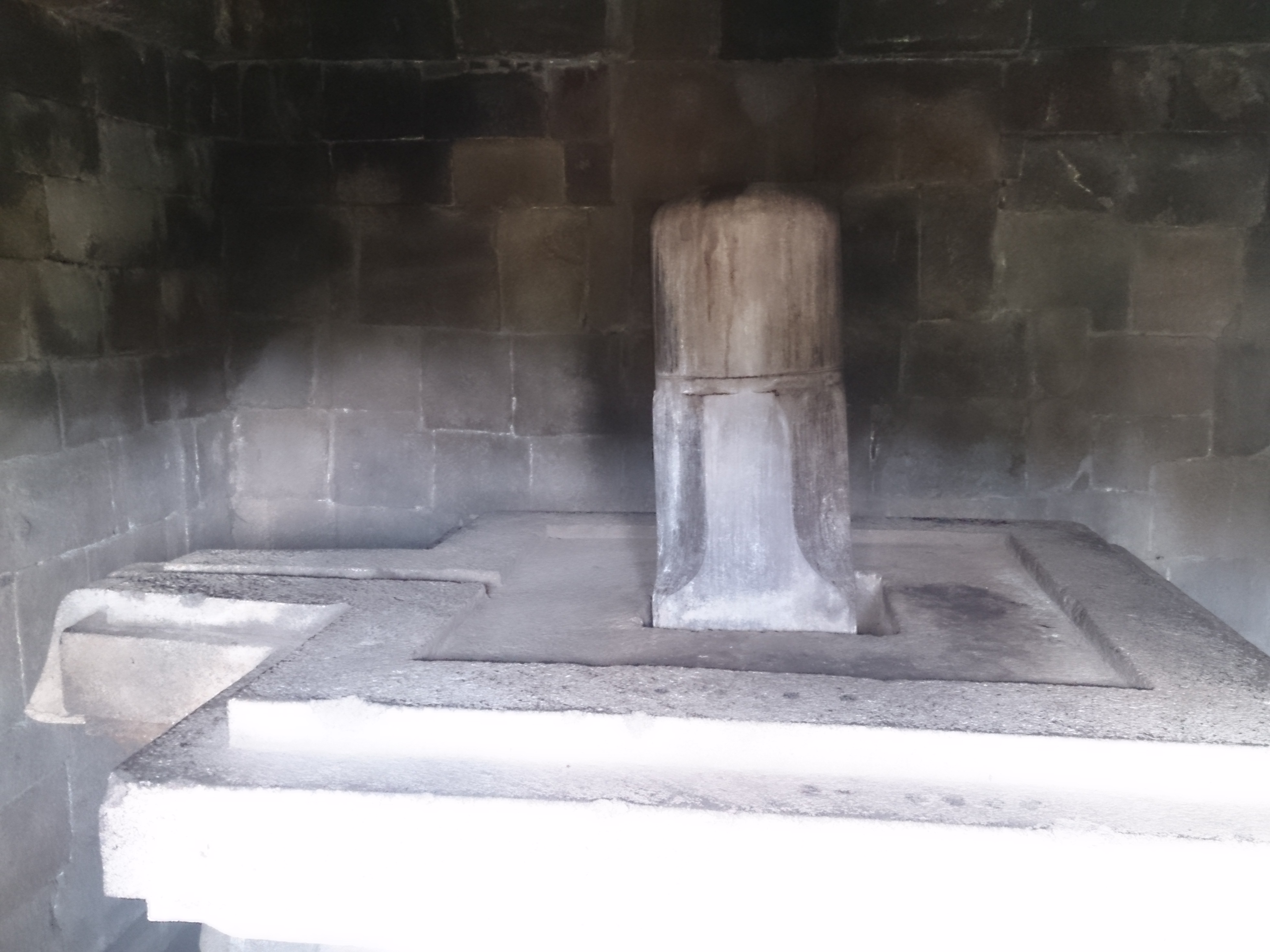
Lingam and yoni at the inner part of main temple

Visitors must descend the flight of stairs on the western side to reach the central part of the temple, the base of which is 6.5 metres (21 ft) lower than the current ground level.

The outer parts are 8 m (26 feet) wide terraces. Recent excavations revealed the outer layer of walls surrounding the temple, which cover a wider area. Only the north-eastern part of this outer wall was excavated, the rest still is buried underground.

The Sambisari complex was surrounded by a rectangular wall made from white stone measured 50 by 48 metres (164 ft × 157 ft). In this main yard, there are eight small lingga, four located at the cardinal points and four others in the corners.

The Sambisari temple complex consisted of a main temple and a row of three smaller pervara (guardian) temples in front of it. The center pervara temple measures 4.9 by 4.8 metres (16 ft × 16 ft), while the northern and southern pervara temple measures 4.8 by 4.8 metres (16 ft × 16 ft) each. Each of these lesser temples has no stone body and roof and only consists of a base part and balustrades.

The main temple faces west and took the form of a square with a size of 13.65 by 13.65 metres (44.8 ft × 44.8 ft). The temple has no real base (foot) part, so the sub-basement part also serves as the base part. The siar is adorned with makara supported by a dwarf (gana). No Kala is carving the top of the main gate. By ascending the stairs, the visitors can reach the rectangular 2.5 metres (8 ft 2 in) wide gallery, which has balustrades surrounding the main temple.

In this gallery there are 12 umpak (stone bases), 8 bases took round shape and 4 others are square ones. These stone bases probably used to support wooden pillars, suggesting that the main temple used to be covered by a roof structure made from organic materials that now are already decayed and gone.

The body of the main temple measures 5 by 5 metres (16 ft × 16 ft) and 2.5 metres (8 ft 2 in) high. Around the temple walls are niches containing statues of Hindu gods, topped by Kala's head. In the northern niche, there is a Durga statue, in the eastern niche, a Ganesha statue, and in the southern niche, an Agastya statue. The portal to the main room is on the western side. The entrance is flanked by niches that once contained guardian statues of Mahakala and Nandisvara. Inside the temple resided a yoni, measured 1.34 by 1.34 metres (4 ft 5 in × 4 ft 5 in) and 1.18 metres (3 ft 10 in) high. On the north side of the yoni, there is a waterspout supported by a Nāga serpent. Atop the yoni is a lingga measuring 0.29 by 0.29 metres (11 in × 11 in) at the base and 0.85 metres (2 ft 9 in) high.

== See also ==
- Prambanan
- Candi of Indonesia
- Hinduism in Java

== Gallery ==
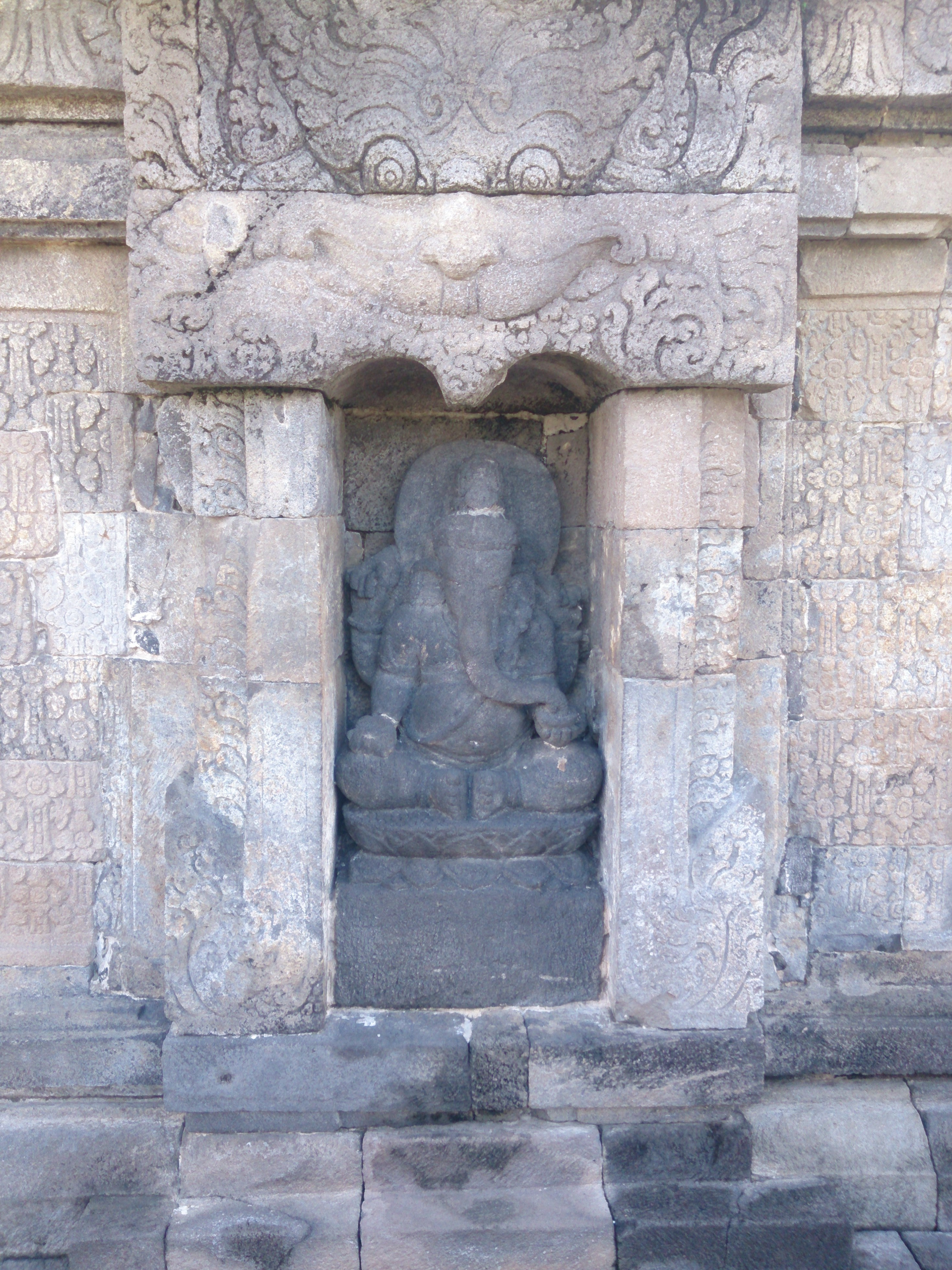
Ganesha statue in eastern niche of Sambisari temple.

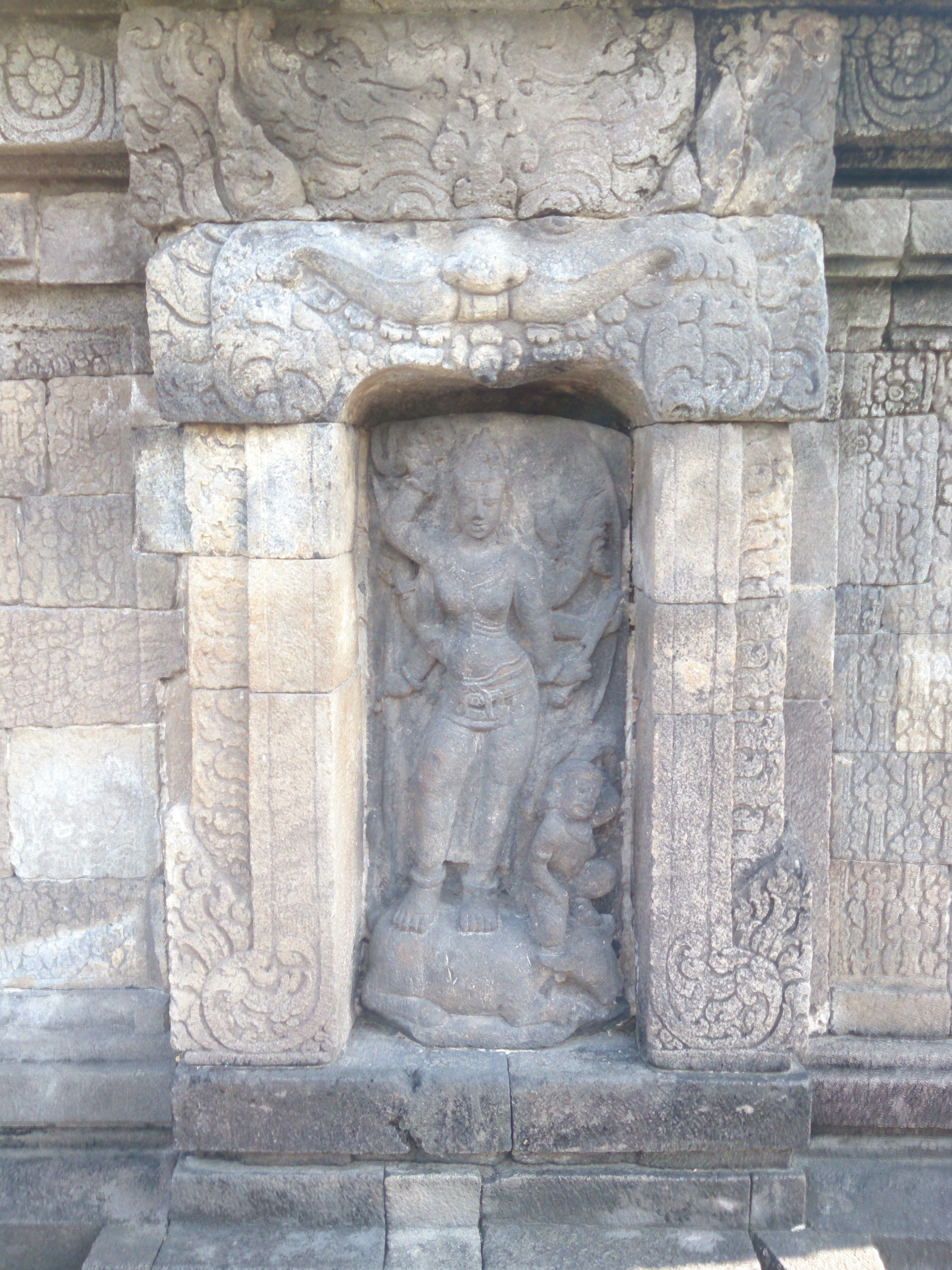
Durgha statue in northern niche of Sambisari temple.

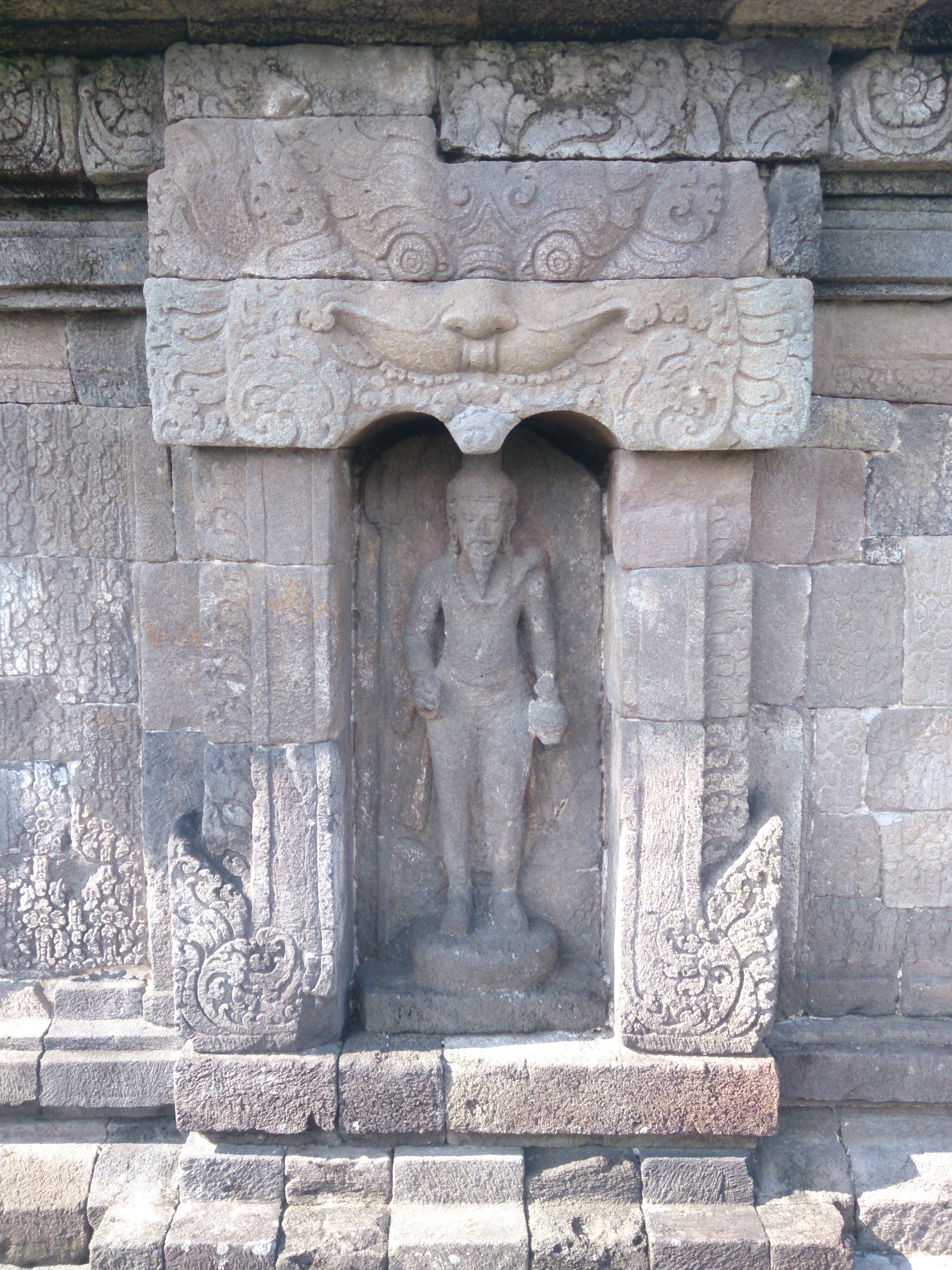
Agastya statue in southern niche of Sambisari temple.

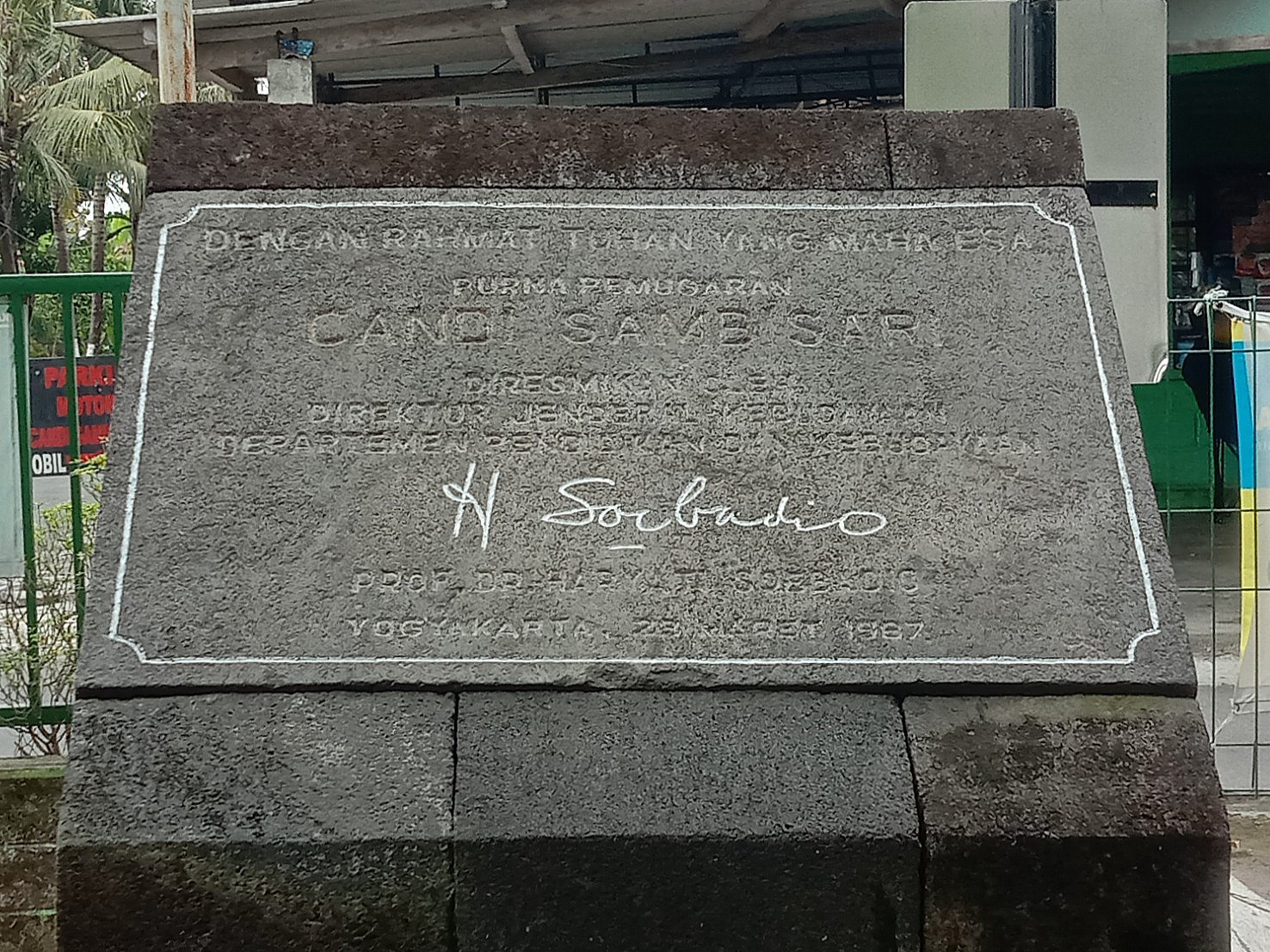
Inauguration inscription of Sambisari Temple by the Director General of Culture, Ministry of Education and Culture, Prof. Dr. Haryati Soebadio, 1987.

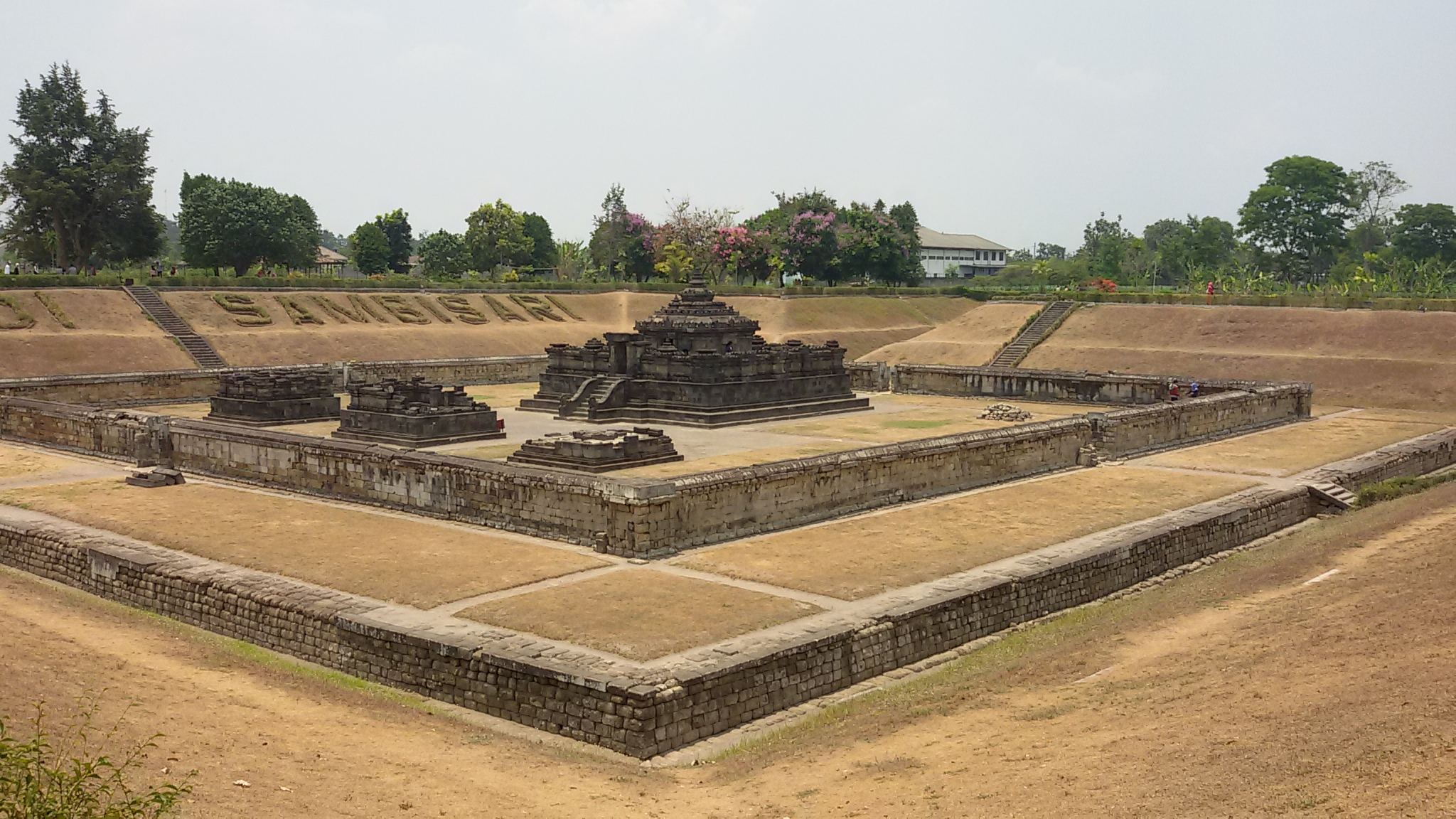
Dry season at Sambisari Temple, October 2015.

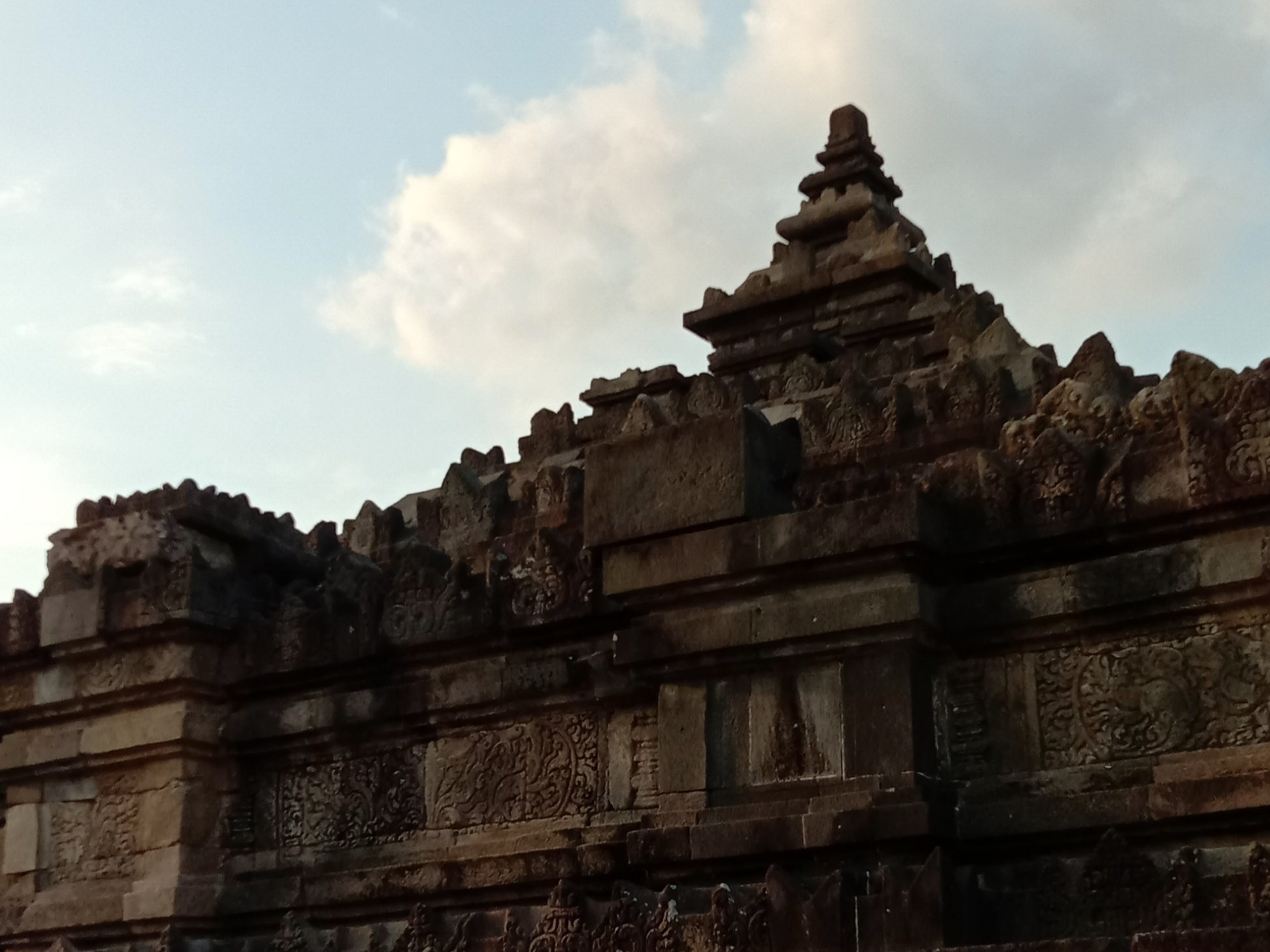
October 2019.

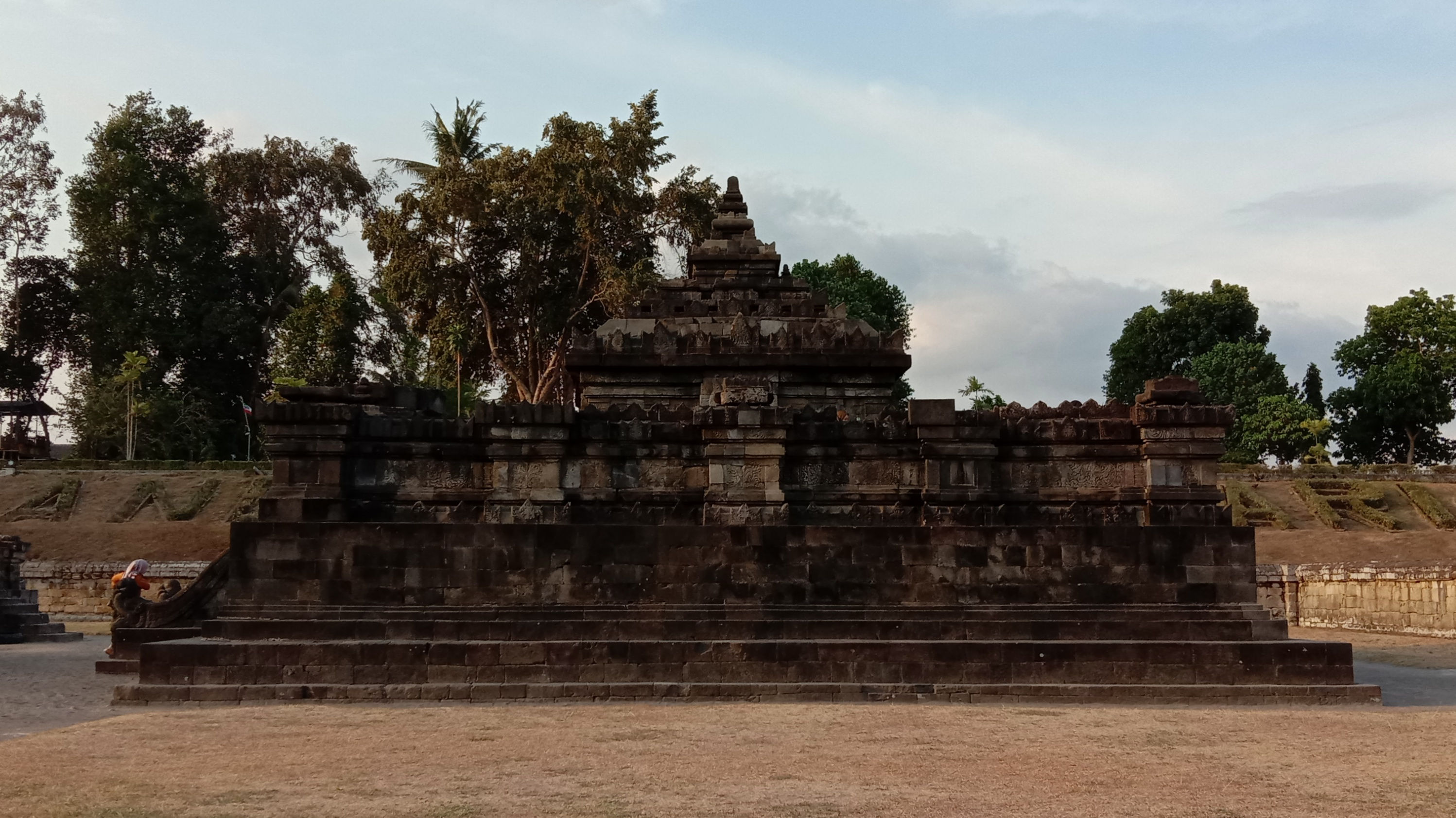
October 2019.

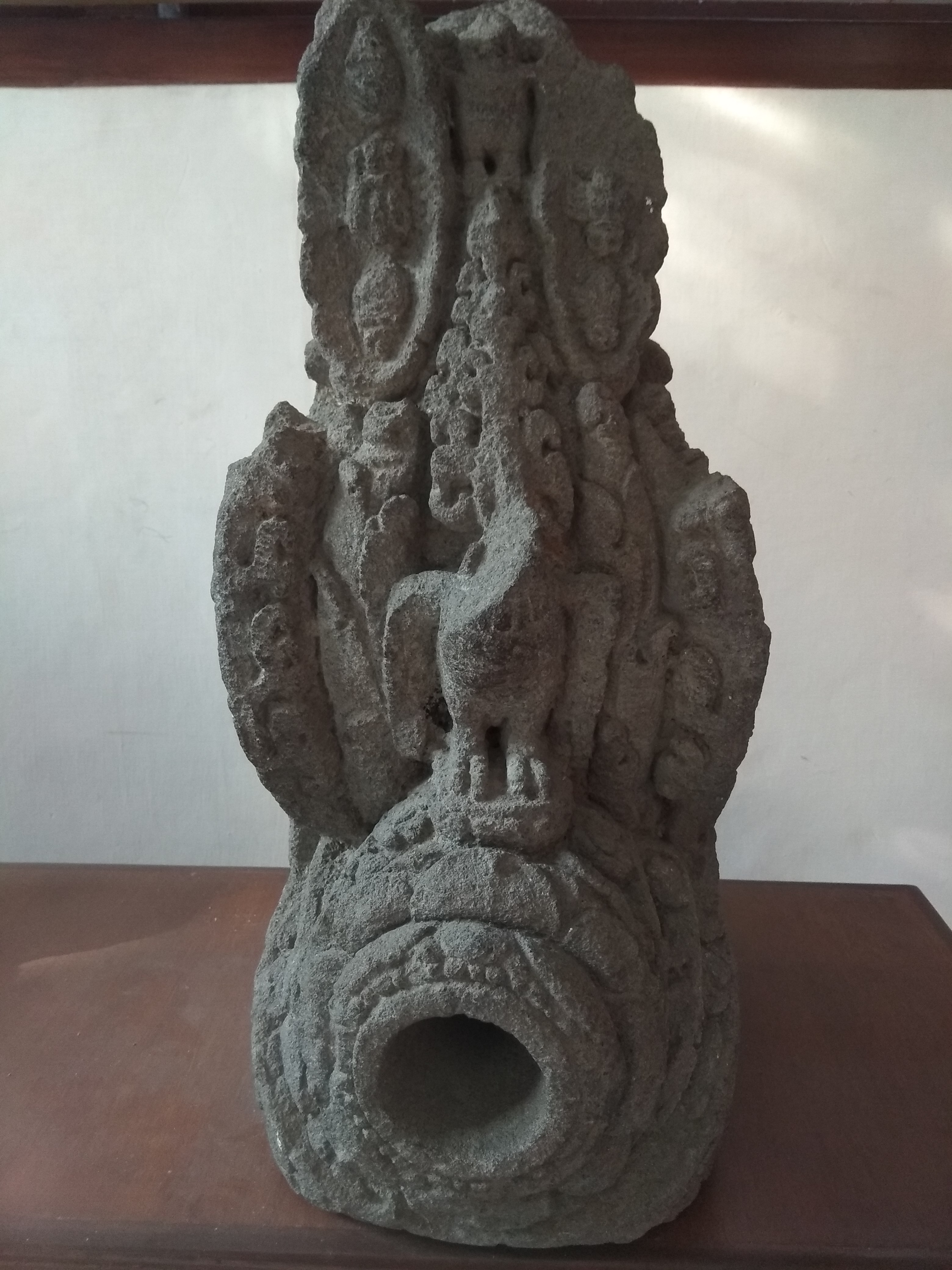
Waterspout (jaladvara) at Sambisari temple
