= Vellalapatti =

A.Vallalapatti
- Panchayat town
- Location in Tamil Nadu, India
- Coordinates: 10.060158°N 78.286780°E
- Country: India
- State: Tamil Nadu
- District: Madurai

Area
  - Total: 8.88 km^{2} (3.43 sq mi)

Population (2011)
  - Total: 8,325
  - Density: 937/km^{2} (2,430/sq mi)

Languages
  - Official: Tamil
- Time zone: UTC+5:30 (IST)

A.Vallalapatti is a panchayat town in Melur taluk of Madurai district in the Indian state of Tamil Nadu. It is one of the nine panchayat towns in the district. Spread across an area of 8.88 km^{2} (3.43 sq mi), it had a population of 8,325 individuals as per the 2011 census. It is under 320th serial number on Town panchayat list of Government of Tamil Nadu found under Madurai district.

== Geography and administration ==
A.Vallalapatti is located in Melur taluk of Madurai district in the Indian state of Tamil Nadu. It is one of the nine panchayat towns in the district. It is spread across an area of 8.88 km^{2} (3.43 sq mi). The town panchayat is headed by a chairperson, who is elected by the members, who are chosen through direct elections. The town forms part of the Melur Assembly constituency that elects its member to the Tamil Nadu legislative assembly and the Madurai Lok Sabha constituency that elects its member to the Parliament of India.

== Demographics ==
As per the 2011 census, A.Vallalapatti had a population of 8,325 individuals across 1,981 households. The population saw a marginal increase compared to the previous census in 2001 when 7,088 inhabitants were registered. The population consisted of 4,177 males and 4,188 females. About 1,002 individuals were below the age of six years. About 19.8% of the population belonged to scheduled castes. The entire population is classified as urban. The town has an average literacy rate of 72%.

About 51.6% of the eligible population were employed, of which majority were involved in agriculture and allied activities. Hinduism was the majority religion which was followed by 91.1% of the population, with Islam (7.8%) and Christianity (0.3%) being minor religions.
