= Akapporul Vilakkam =

Akapporul vilakkam (Tamil: அகப்பொருள் விளக்கம் "An explanation of the love theme"), also known as Nambi akapporul ("Nambi's treatise on the love theme"), is a mediaeval treatise on Tamil akam poetics written by Narkavirasa Nambi (Tamil: நாற்கவிராச நம்பி). The treatise dates to the 13th century. It is closely associated with the Tancaivanankovai of Poyyamolipulavar, a set of connected poems in the form of a kovai on the life of the Pandiyan king Maravarman Kulasekara Pandiyan I, which was written as an ilakkiyam to illustrate the successive rules of Akapporul Vilakkam.

Unlike earlier works on akam poetics, the Akapporul Vilakkam divides the phases of a relationship into three, adding an intermediate phase of varaivu ("marriage") to the two phases of kalavu ("stolen love") and karpu ("chaste love") discussed in earlier texts. The text's discussion of the topics that are the subject of akam poetry is classified according to a hierarchy of situations and events (kilavi, vakai and viri), unlike earlier grammars which classify topics according to the speaker (kurru).
