= Anne E. Monius =

American Indologist and religious scholar (1964–2019)

Anne Elizabeth Monius
- Born: February 17, 1964; New Hampshire, U.S.
- Died: August 3, 2019 (aged 55); Cambridge, Massachusetts, U.S.

Academic background
- Education: Harvard University
- Thesis: In search of 'Tamil Buddhism' : language, literary culture, and religious community in Tamil-speaking South India (1997)

Academic work
- Discipline: Indology
- Sub-discipline: Religion
- Institutions: University of Virginia, Harvard Divinity School
- Main interests: Indian religious literature

Anne Elizabeth Monius (February 17, 1964 – August 3, 2019) was an American Indologist and religious scholar. She was a professor of South Asian Religions at the Harvard Divinity School, best known for her analyses of literary culture to reconstruct the history of faiths in South India.

== Life ==
Monius was born in New Hampshire to Felix and Eleanor Monius, who were farmers. Her grandfather was an immigrant to the US from Lithuania.

Monius attended Hollis Area High School in Hollis, New Hampshire, where she was valedictorian in 1982. She then went to Harvard University to study theoretical astrophysics. Inspired by a course on Indian civilisation by Diana L. Eck, she switched majors to South Asian religions. She obtained her undergraduate degree in 1986, and followed with master's and doctoral degrees (1997) from Harvard.

"A distinguished scholar and engaging teacher, Monius taught for 17 years at Harvard Divinity School, where she specialized in the religious traditions of India. Her research examined the practices and products of literary culture to reconstruct the history of religions in South Asia."

“Formidably intelligent and rigorous as a scholar, infectiously curious and eclectic in her interests, and exemplary in her teaching and mentoring of students, it is hard to imagine HDS without Anne Monius,” said Harvard Divinity School Dean David N. Hempton. “Her laughter, zest for life, and courage in the face of adversity were inspirational, as were her unfailing messages of gratitude."

Monius was married to Wilson Manoharan.

She died of natural causes on August 3, 2019, at the age of 55.

== Career ==
From 1997 to 2002, Monius taught in the department of religious studies at the University of Virginia. She joined the Harvard Divinity School in 2002, where she continued till her death. She was made a full professor in 2004.

From 2010, Monius was the editor of the American Academy of Religion's book series Religion in Translation, a continuation of the Texts and Translations series that she co-edited since 2004.

=== Research ===
Monius studied in Chennai for two years, researching two Buddhist texts in the Tamil language, the only ones that have survived to date. This formed the basis of her doctoral dissertation, which she expanded to her 2001 book, Imagining a Place for Buddhism: Literary Culture and Religious Community in Tamil-Speaking South India.

This book sought to establish the cultural milieu of the Tamil country from the Manimekalai (thought to date from the 6th century) and the Virocoliyam (11th century). Monius suggested that it was possible to tease out their world even in the absence of contextual background in the form of archaeology or parallel developments in Southeast Asian Buddhism. She reconstructed the world of the former text, drawing parallels from the Jaina Cilappatikaram. Monius placed these texts within a pan-Buddhist sphere that worked across languages, establishing connections with Pali and Sanskrit literary productions. The book was well received by reviewers.

In her studies of the South Indian bhakti tradition, Monius established that it was predominantly a Saivite movement than a Vaishnavite one. She showed that the Tamil litterateurs did not restrict themselves to their local geography but wished to expand the scope of the Tamil bhakti universe to northern India, including the Himalayas, which are considered to be Shiva's domains, albeit with an understanding that the essential core was a Tamil one.

Continuing with the theme of religious ecumenism, Monius discussed the presence of the Hindu god Krishna in two Tamil texts, the Buddhist Manimekalai and the Jaina Cilappatikaram. Krishna's cosmic dance is described, as well as other figures from Krishna-lore (notably Balarama and Radha).

At the time of her death, Monius was working on a book to be titled Singing the Lives of Śiva’s Saints: History, Aesthetics, and Religious Identity in Tamil-speaking South India, that examined the formation of Śaiva identity in Tamil Nadu under the Cholas from the ninth to the twelfth centuries. She was also part of a team of scholars translating the Tamil version of the Rāmāyaṇa.

== Selected works ==
- Anne E. Monius (2001). Imagining a Place for Buddhism: Literary Culture and Religious Community in Tamil-Speaking South India. Oxford University. ISBN 978-0-19-803206-9.
- Gil Ben-Herut; Jon Keune; Anne E. Monius, eds. (2019). Regional Communities of Devotion in South Asia: Insiders, Outsiders, and Interlopers. Taylor & Francis. ISBN 978-1-351-02336-8.
