= Melur taluk =

Coordinates: 10.05°N 78.33°E

Melur taluk is a taluk of Madurai district of the Indian state of Tamil Nadu. The headquarters of the taluk is the town of Melur.

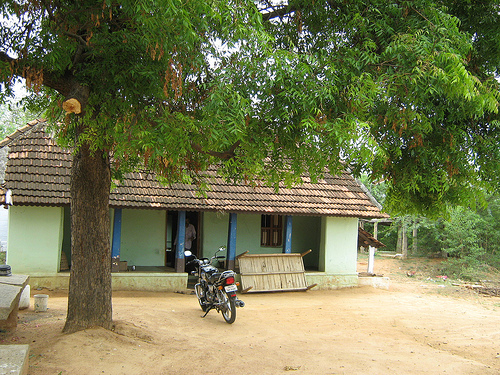
Traditional architecture of Madurai district

== Demographics ==
According to the 2011 census, the taluk of Melur had a population of 290,985 with 146,499 males and 144,486 females. There were 986 women for every 1,000 men. The taluk had a literacy rate of 68.91%. Child population in the age group below 6 years were 16,258 Males and 14,540 Females.
