= Tamil Renaissance =

Tamil-speaking social movement in 19th-century India

Tamil Renaissance refers to the literary, cultural, social reform and political movements that took place in the Tamil-speaking districts of Southern India starting in the second half of the 19th century and lasting to the culmination of the anti-Hindi agitations of the 1960s.

The period was characterized by a literary revival, spearheaded by Tamil writers of two different factions. One preferred an increased mixture of Sanskrit words with Tamil, believing that such a fusion raised the quality of Tamil language. The other faction favored reducing Sanskrit words to the barest minimum, in the belief that Sanskrit-origin words made the Tamil language lose its individuality. Rapid propagation of Western ideas and formulation of the Dravidian civilization theory during the second half of the 19th century inculcated a sense of pride in educated Tamils, eventually leading to the birth of Tamil nationalism, which inspired the Dravidian movement.

== Beginnings ==
When the British Crown took over the administration of the country from the British East India Company, there was a rapid rise in literacy levels in South India. Brahmins reaped huge advantages from the reward-for-merit policy of the British Raj and eventually emerged as the foremost elite group among the native Indians. By the beginning of the 20th century, the domination of Brahmins turned into a monopoly, as some favoured members of their own community over others in government appointments.

The second half of the 19th century also saw the rebirth of Tamil pride, based on a distinct non-Aryan Dravidian identity. The Comparative Study of the Dravidian Family of Languages by Bishop Robert Caldwell, for the first time, classified words in Dravidian tongues by their linguistic roots and distinguished them from their Indo-Aryan equivalents. The antiquity and greatness of Tamil civilization was further revealed by the archaeological discoveries of Robert Bruce Foote and the rediscovery and reproduction of ancient Tamil classics by U. V. Swaminatha Iyer. Dravidian individualism combined with resentment of Brahmin domination eventually led to the birth of the Anti-Brahmin movement and inspired the works of K. N. Sivaraja Pillai, Maraimalai Adigal and Bharathidasan and the socio-political movements of Iyothee Thass and E. V. Ramasami. It also inspired the romanticism of V. Kanakasabhai and L. D. Swamikannu Pillai.

Tamil nationalism also inspired a pan-Indian anti-British school of thought, thereby strengthening the Indian independence movement in Tamil Nadu. Indian independence activists like Subramanya Bharathy, Chakravarthi Rajagopalachari, V. O. Chidambaram Pillai, V. V. S. Aiyar, Subramania Siva, V. Kalyanasundara Mudaliar and M. P. Sivagnanam were accomplished Tamil writers.

== Key individuals ==
Linguists and litterateurs

- G. U. Pope
- Robert Caldwell
- U. V. Swaminatha Iyer
- C. W. Thamotharampillai
- S. Vaiyapuri Pillai

Historians

- C. Hayavadana Rao
- V. Kanakasabhai
- S. Krishnaswami Aiyangar
- C. Minakshi
- K. A. Nilakanta Sastri
- M. S. Purnalingam Pillai
- R. Raghava Iyengar
- V. R. Ramachandra Dikshitar
- T. R. Sesha Iyengar
- K. N. Sivaraja Pillai
- P. T. Srinivasa Iyengar

Epigraphists

- E. Hultzsch
- H. Krishna Sastri
- Iravatham Mahadevan
- C. Sivaramamurti
- K. V. Subrahmanya Aiyar
- V. Venkayya

Mysticists

- Devaneya Pavanar
- L. D. Swamikannu Pillai

Science and Mathematics

- C. V. Raman
- Srinivasa Ramanujan
- K. S. Krishnan
- S. R. Ranganathan
- Gopalswamy Doraiswamy Naidu
- G. N. Ramachandran
- Subrahmanyan Chandrasekhar
- S. R. Srinivasa Varadhan
- Venki Ramakrishnan
- Sivaramakrishna Chandrasekhar
- T. R. Seshadri
- M. S. Narasimhan
- C. S. Seshadri
- M. S. Raghunathan

Writers and journalists

- V. V. S. Aiyar
- Asokamitran
- C. S. Chellappa
- V. Kalyanasundaram Mudaliar
- C. N. Annadurai
- M. Karunanidhi
- Kalki Krishnamurthy
- Kalki Sadasivam
- G. A. Natesan
- Puthumaipithan
- Samuel Vedanayagam Pillai
- Subrahmanya Bharathy

== See also ==
- List of Sahitya Akademi Award winners for Tamil
- List of Tamil-language writers

== Bibliography ==
- K. Nambi Arooran (1980). Tamil Renaissance and the Dravidian Movement, 1905-1944. Koodal.
- R. E. Asher. Tamil Renaissance and Beginnings of the Tamil Novel.
- Charles A. Ryerson (1988). Regionalism and religion: the Tamil renaissance and popular Hinduism. Christian Literature Society.
- Robert L. Hardgrave. The Justice Party and the Tamil Renaissance.
- Prema Nandakumar (1964). "Bharati and Tamil Renaissance". Subramania Bharati.
