= Joe D'Cruz =

Tamil writer

R. N. Joe D'Cruz
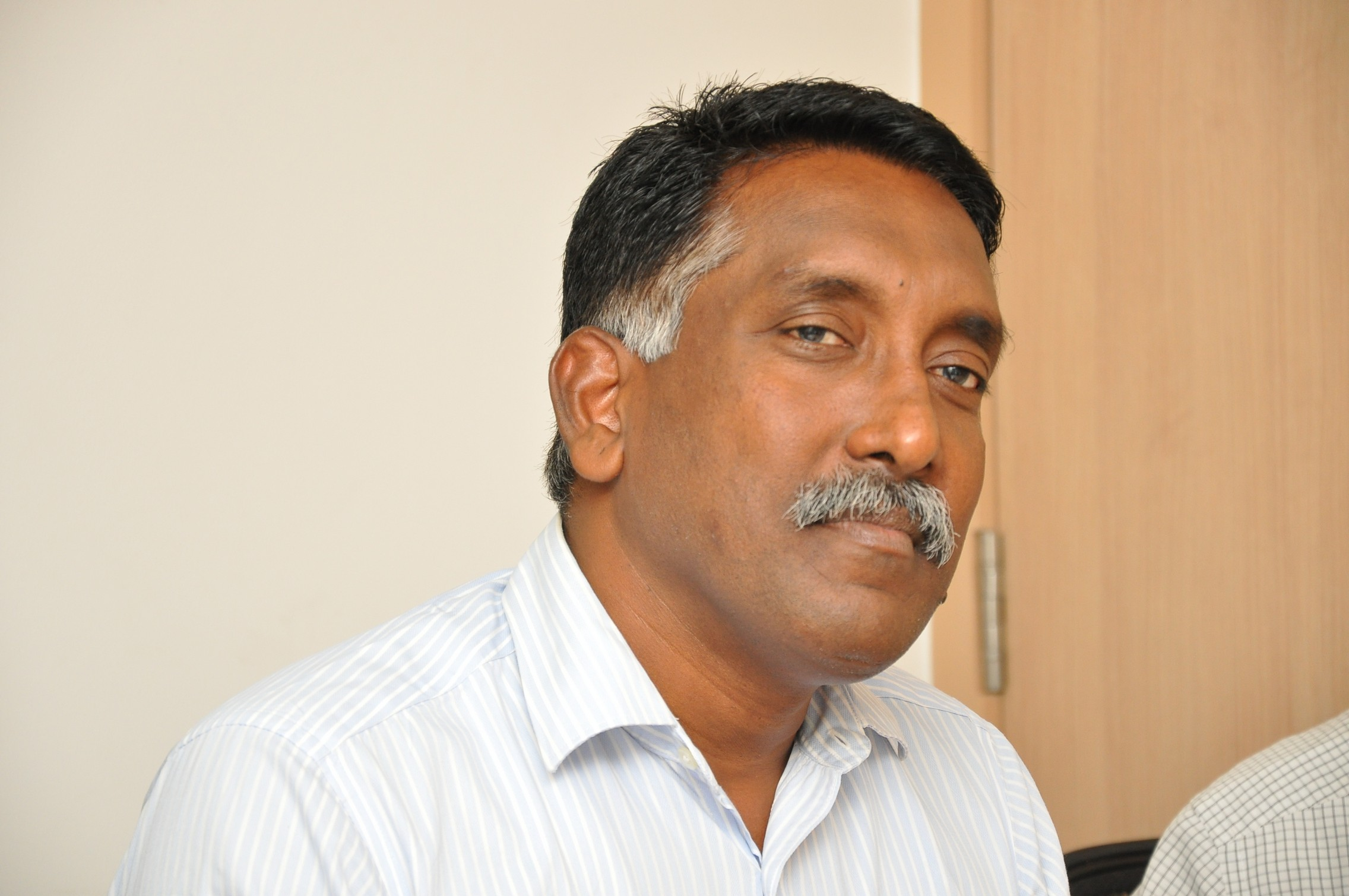
- Born: 1969 (age 56–57); Uvari, Tirunelveli District, Tamil Nadu, India
- Occupations: Novelist, Ship management
- Spouse: Sasikala
- Writing career
- Language: Tamil
- Subject: Literature
- Notable awards: Sahitya Akademi Award (2013)

R. N. Joe D'Cruz is a Tamil writer, novelist and documentary film director from Tamil Nadu, India. He won the Sahitya Akademi award in 2013 in the Tamil language category for his novel Korkai. He is the Tamil Nadu state president of Samskrita Bharati.

Joe D'Cruz has also been a managerial-executive in the shipping industry for a long time and is currently a member of the National Shipping Board of the Ministry of Shipping, Government of India.

== Life ==
Joe D'Cruz was born in a Roman Catholic Paravar family in Uvari, a coastal village in Tirunelveli District of Tamil Nadu. He did his schooling in Uvari and Idaiyangudi. He graduated with an M.A.(Economics) at Loyola College, Chennai and did his M.Phil at St. Joseph's College, Tiruchirapalli. He is married to Sasikala and has two children. He has been working in the shipping industry for more than two decades.

== Works ==
Joe D'Cruz published a Tamil poetry compilation, Pulambazhkal, in 2004. His Sahitya Akademi award-winning novel Korkai was originally published in 2009 and prior to that his 2005 novel Aazhi Soozh Ulagu was awarded the Tamil Nadu state government literary award and Tamil Literary Garden award. Both his novels are based on history and the lives of Parathavar fishermen of Tamil Nadu. The first novel Aazhi Soozh Ulagu dealt with the lives of fishermen who used catamarans and their conversion to Christianity. The second novel titled Korkai refers to Korkai, an ancient port city ruled by Early Pandyan Kingdom. It is about the 20th century community of pearl and conch divers there.

He also filmed documentary films such as Vidiyatha Pozhuthukal (2008), Towards Dawn (2010). His films mostly based on sufferings of Tamil fishermen. He wrote the dialogue for Tamil movie Maryan. He opposed Kudankulam nuclear power project, arguing it will affect the livelihood of the fishermen.

He has also expressed his reservations on the upcoming International Container Transhipment Terminal at Enayam, Kanyakumari District. He is in favour of developing existing ports over initiating new port projects in India.

== Support for LGBTQIA+ Community ==
Joe D'Cruz along with writer Aravindan Neelakandan supported the initiatives of Gopi Shankar Madurai and served on the advisory board of Srishti Madurai under Anjali Gopalan, Bracha Ettinger.

== Views ==
The Indian Express reported that Joe D'Cruz received threats and hate-mail after he expressed support for the BJP PM Candidate in the 2014 Lok Sabha elections, Mr. Narendra Modi, on his Facebook page. A translation of his work ‘Aazhi Soozh Ulagu’ into English, was also halted in retaliation by his publisher Navyana and the translator Geetha.

He turned as a strong critic of the Bharatiya Janata party, three years later. In an interview with The Hindu, he claimed to have realised that because Modi rose up through the grassroot levels, it was a myth that he would become a strong Prime Minister, and that the BJP leadership appears to be focused in reinforcing the caste structure and Manu Smriti. He also criticized the BJP for emboldening political forces to kill people for eating beef. In June 2017, he claimed that there is "No place for poor" in the agenda of Prime minister Narendra Modi. He criticized the proposed Maritime Container Terminal at Enayam by the BJP government and said the promoters of the project were claiming that the Enayam coastline was a natural harbour but the coast is vulnerable to natural calamities.

== Bibliography ==
=== Novels ===
- Aazhi Soozh Ulagu
- Korkai
- Asthinapuram
- Verpiditha Vilai Nilangal
- Kavanam thedum Kadaloram
- Padaipugalin Uraiyadal

== See also ==
- List of Sahitya Akademi Award winners for Tamil
- List of Indian writers
- List of Tamil-language writers
