= Suyambulingaswamy Temple, Uvari =

Hindu temple in India

Suyambulingaswamy Temple
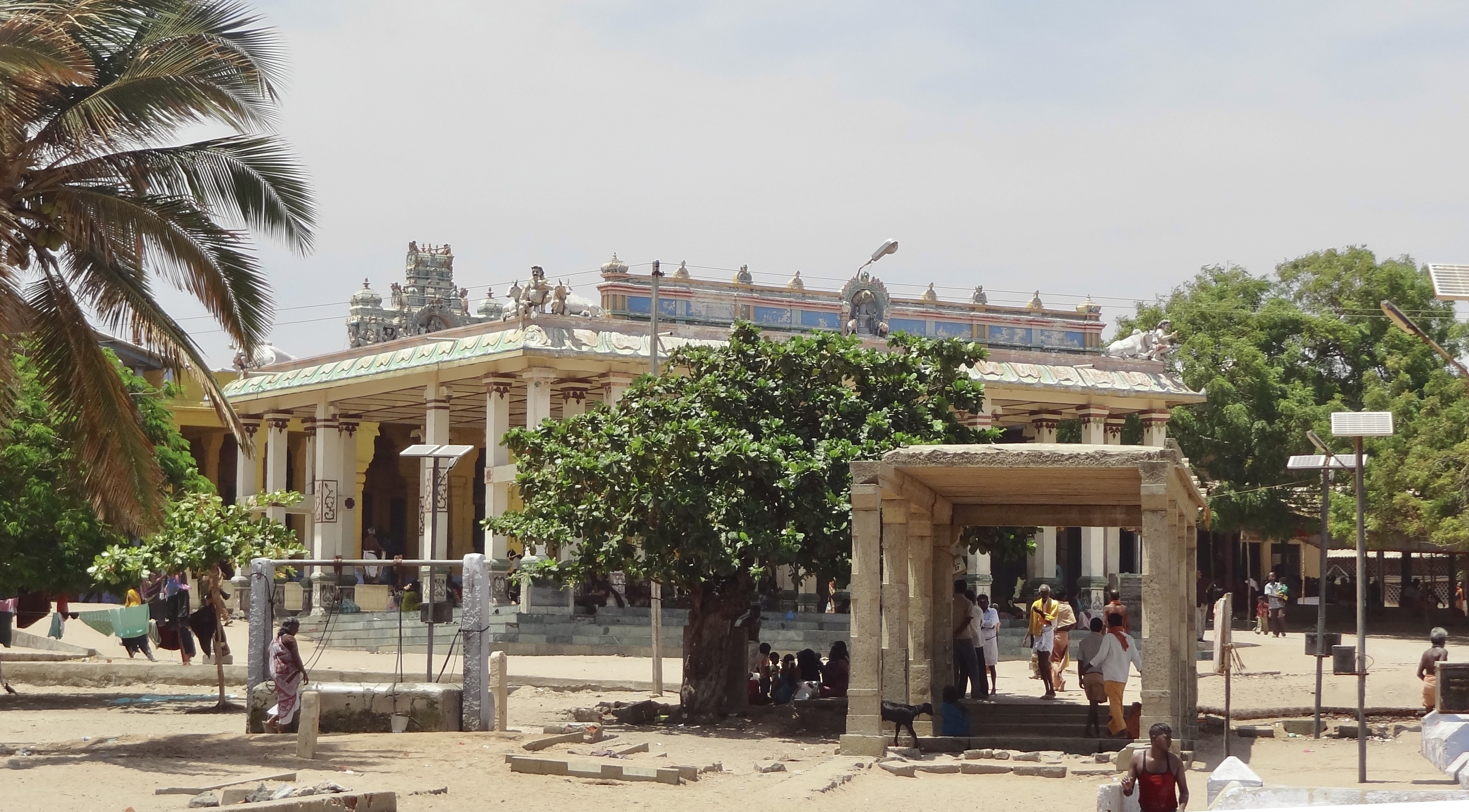

Religion
- Affiliation: Hinduism
- District: Tirunelveli district
- Province: Tamil Nadu

Location
- Location: Uvari
- Country: India
- Interactive map of Suyambulingaswamy Temple
- Coordinates: 8.2863°N 77.8994°E

Website
- http://uvari.info

Suyambulingaswamy Temple is a Siva temple in Uvari in Tirunelveli district in Tamil Nadu India.

== Presiding deity ==
The presiding deity of the temple is known as Swayambunathar. Lord Shiva graces the devotees in Swayambhu form. Rays of Sun fall on the deity throughout the Tamil month of Marghazhi (December–January). The Goddess is known as Brahma Sakthi.

== Location ==
This temple is 35 km in Tiruchendur-Kanyakumari road at a distance of 25 km from Tirunelveli Kudankulam Nuclear Power Plant. The temple is open for worship from 6.00 a.m. to 1.00 p.m. and 4.00 p.m. to 8.00 p.m.

== Speciality ==
The diseases vanish if the devotee bathes in the sea for 41 days and pray to the presiding deity. The problems of the physically challenged and mentally challenged get cured. As thanksgiving the devotees carry the sea sand in 11 or 41 baskets and put them near the temple. Some make Nāga idols and place them in the temple.

== Prayer Method ==
1.Take bath in the sea and take bath in the fresh water pond. 2.Then Worship Lord Kanni Vinayaga 3.Then worship Sri Suyambulinga 4.Then worship Goddess Brhama Sakthi Amman 5.Then worship Goddess Essaki Amman 6.Then worship Lord Munnodi 7.Then worship Lord Sastha

== Other shrines ==
Shrines of Kanni Vinayaka, Brahma Sakthi Amman, Munnadi Sami, Petchi Amman, Madasamy and Isakki Amman are also found in this temple.

== Festivals ==
Vaikasi Visakam, Thaipusam, Panguni Uthiram, New moon days in Tamil month of Adi, Margazhi Tiruvadhirai, Karthikai are some of the festivals held in this temple. On Pradosha days, Vinayakar Chadurthi, Diwali and Pongal also devotees come and offer worship here.

== Gallery ==
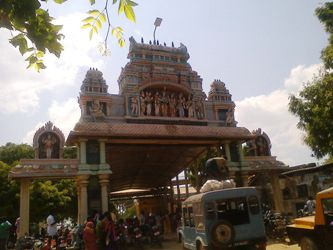
Temple entrance

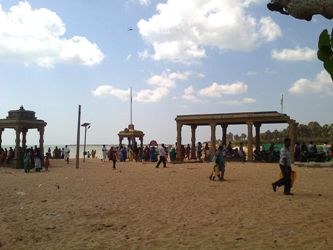
Sea near the temple

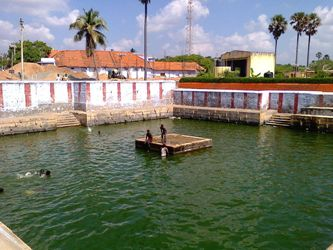
Temple tank

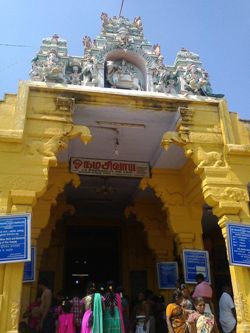
Shrine of the presiding deity

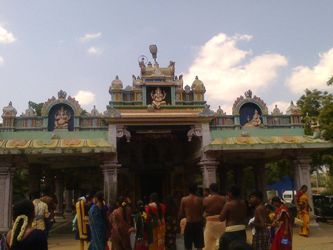
Shrine of Kanni Vinayaka

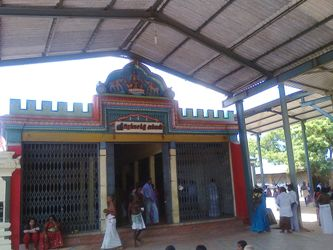
Shrine of Brahma Sakthi Amman

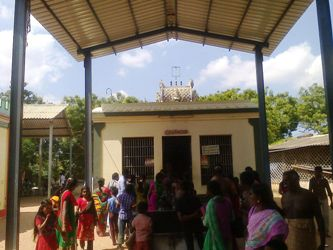
Shrine of Petchi Amman
