= Pandy Malayalam =

Dialect of Malayalam

Pandy Malayalam or Pandyan Malayalam is a dialect of Malayalam spoken by immigrants from Pandian kingdom in those regions of Kerala. It is the most spoken dialect in the district of Trivandrum and, according to an 1875 work by Robert Caldwell, this was also the case then in southern parts of Kollam district.
