= K. N. Sivaraja Pillai =

K. Narayana Sivaraja Pillai (1879–1941) was an Indian historian, dravidologist and university teacher from the erstwhile Madras Presidency.

== Academic career ==
When the Tamil Department of the Oriental Research Institute of the University of Madras was established in 1927, Pillai was appointed reader with E. V. Anantharama Aiyar and K. Varadarajulu Naidu as the fellows. In 1930, when the department was reorganized Sivaraja Pillai was made senior lecturer. Pillai retired in 1936.

== Methodology ==
Pillai stressed analysis of historicity of tradition in the study of ancient Tamil history. In his 1932 book, Chronology of the Ancient Tamils, he wrote, "...venerable as the Sangam tradition in the Tamil land first put into shape by the commentator on [Iraiyanar Akapporul] and sedulously propagated by later commentators, we have to examine it closely and satisfy ourselves first about its authenticity and secondly for its evidentiary value for the purposes of history."

Sivaraja Pillai was regarded as a pioneer in the study of ancient verbal terminations.

== Works ==
- The Chronology of the Early Tamils. University of Madras. 1932.
- Agastya in the Tamil land. University of Madras.
