= Idaiyangudi =

- village
- Location in Tamil Nadu
- Coordinates: 8°18′50″N 77°52′55″E
- Country: India
- State: Tamil Nadu
- District: Tirunelveli

Population (2001)
  - Total: 19,557

Idaiyangudi is a village, at Idaiyangudi panchayat in Tirunelveli district in the Indian state of Tamil Nadu. It lies between Uvari and Thisayanvilai. The nearest railway station is Nanguneri and the nearest airport is in Thoothukudi. It is well connected to Thirunelveli, 40 miles north-west. This village was the recipient of the Uthamar Gandhi award in 2008.

== Geography ==
The region is mostly semi-arid and the weather is humid though the evenings are cooler as the Bay of Bengal is just two kilometres away.

== History ==
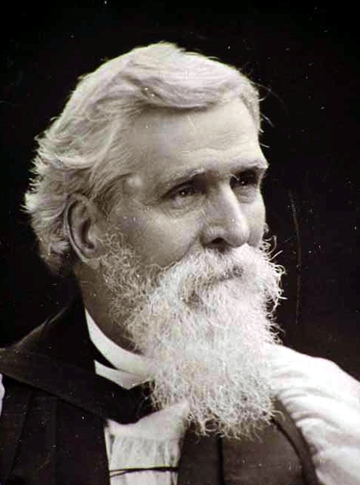
Robert Caldwell

Robert Caldwell spent most of his life in this village as a missionary. He came from Clady, County Tyrone, Northern Ireland. Due to his firm faith in Christianity, he became a missionary and travelled to India to spread Christianity. On arrival in India, he selected this village as his centre, and decided to spread Christianity in the surrounding region. He lived in this village until his death.

After his death, he was buried at the altar of the Holy Trinity church in the village. To recognize his contribution to the Tamil and Dravidian languages, Robert Caldwell's house in Idaiyangudi was converted into a memorial by the Government of Tamil Nadu.

== Demographics ==
The majority of the people living here are Christians. They were mostly converted by Robert Caldwell in the 19th century.

== Landmarks ==
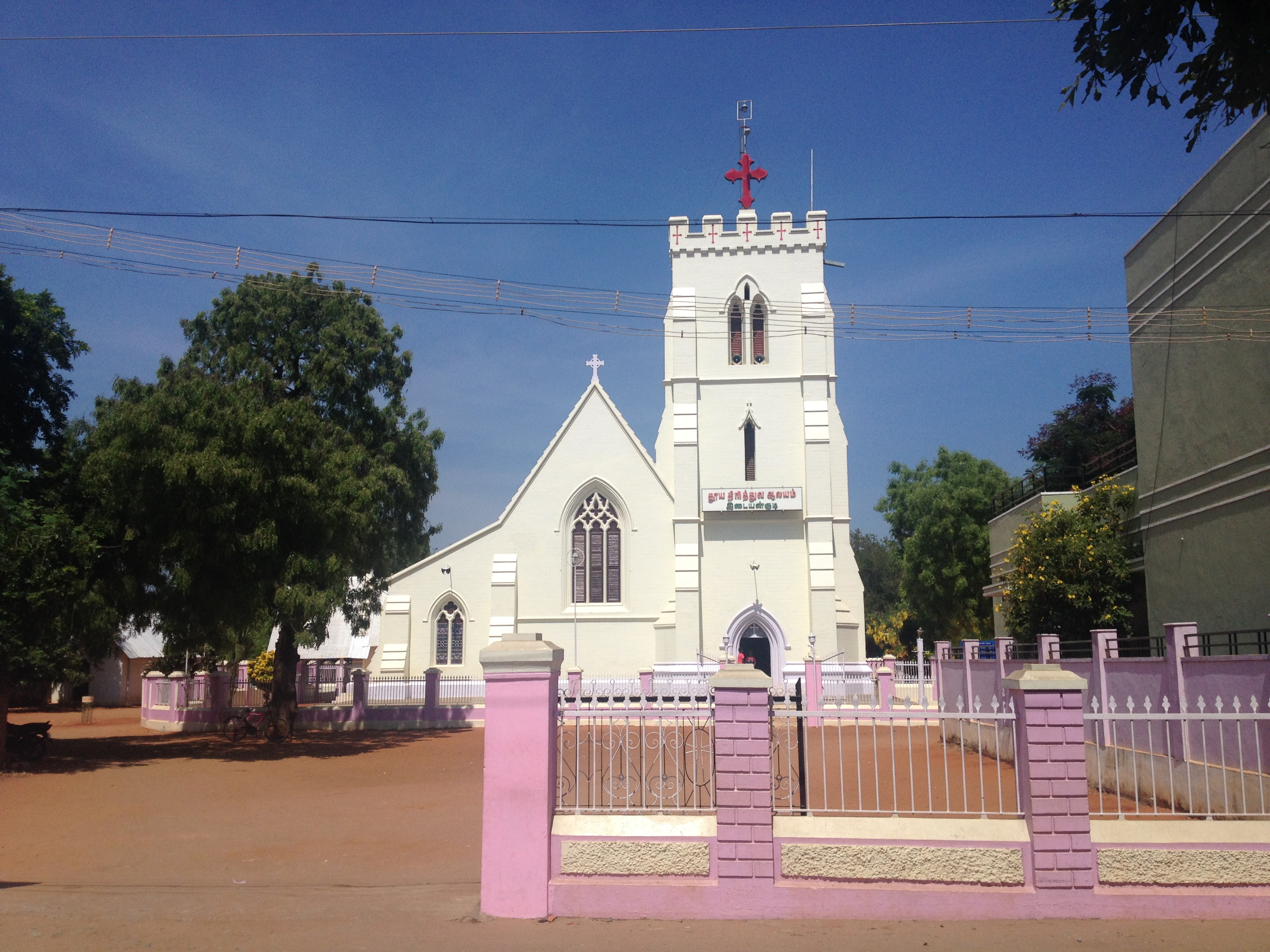
Holy Trinity Church

Holy Trinity Church, which is situated in the heart of the village, is considered as the landmark of this village. The church was constructed by Robert Caldwell. The church was built in Gothic style. This church was inaugurated on 6 July 1880. Most of the land around this village is owned by the church.

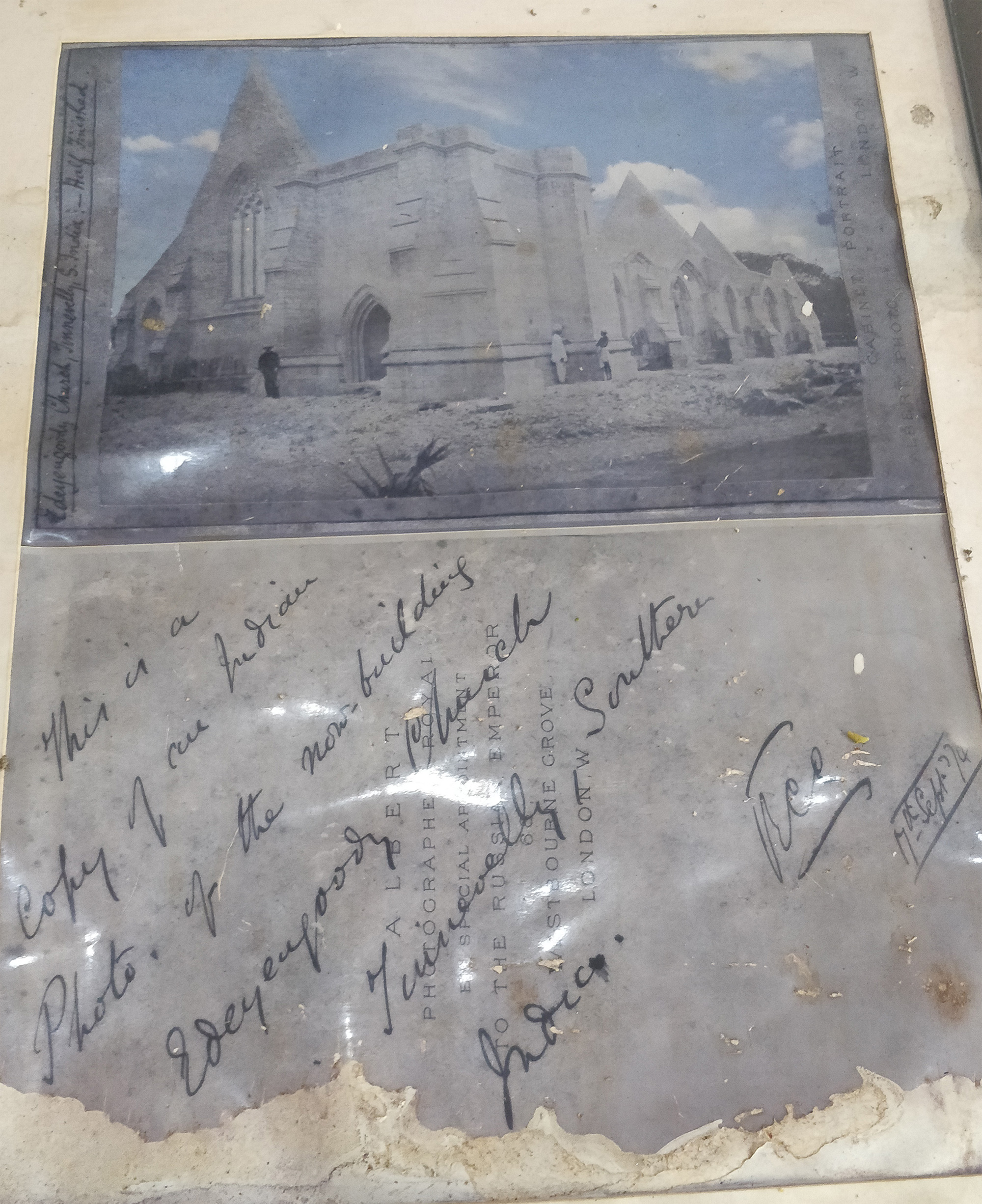

== Education ==
The Caldwell Centenary Memorial Higher Secondary School caters to the educational needs of the children present in the village, though many move to schools in the neighbouring towns. There is also a nursing college that trains students for the nursing profession.
