= A Comparative Grammar of the Dravidian or South-Indian Family of Languages =

1856 book by Robert Caldwell

A Comparative Grammar of the Dravidian or South-Indian Family of Languages is a book on comparative linguistics written by Robert Caldwell in 1856, a Christian missionary, who later became the assistant Bishop of Tirunelveli. In this book, Caldwell proposed that there are Dravidian words in the Hebrew of the Old Testament, the archaic Greek language, and the places named by Ptolemy.
