= Uvari =

Uvari Parathar Uvari
- Village
- Location in Tamil Nadu, India
- Coordinates: 8.286205°N 77.899305°E
- Country: India
- State: Tamil Nadu
- District: Tirunelveli district

Government
  - Type: Census Town
- Elevation: 12.44 m (40.8 ft)

Population (2001)
  - Total: 25,000

Languages
  - Official: Tamil
- Time zone: UTC+5:30 (IST)
- Postal code: 627651

Uvari is a coastal village in Thisayanvilai Taluk, Tirunelveli district, Tamil Nadu, India. The total geographical area of the Uvari is around 3 km^{2} (1.2 sq mi). Uvari is surrounded by Idaiyangudi, Navaladi, Karaisuthu Uvari and the Bay of Bengal. Uvari is rich in mineral resources like limestone, Ilmenite, and red garnet sands.

== Economy ==
Local inhabitants primarily work as sailors or fishermen.

== Education ==
Seven schools are located in Uvari, including:

- St. Mary's Primary School
- St. Mary's Hr Secondary School
- St. Joseph Middle School
- St. Antony's CBSC School

== Health care ==
Two hospitals are located in Uvari:

- St. Joseph Health Center
- Government Primary Healthcare Hospital

== Facilities ==
Two banks are located in Uvari.

- Canara Bank (with ATM)
- Muthoot Finance
- Muthoot Fincorp

Post Office (627651)

BSNL Telephone Exchange (277 series)

== Religion ==
Christianity is the most commonly practiced religions in Uvari.

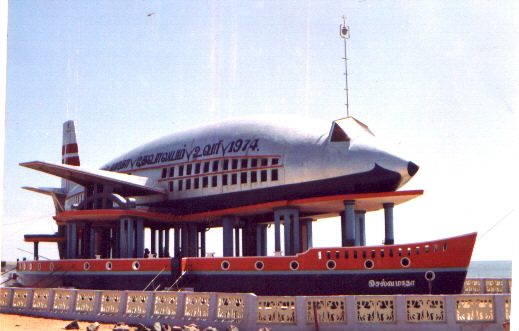
Kappal Matha Church

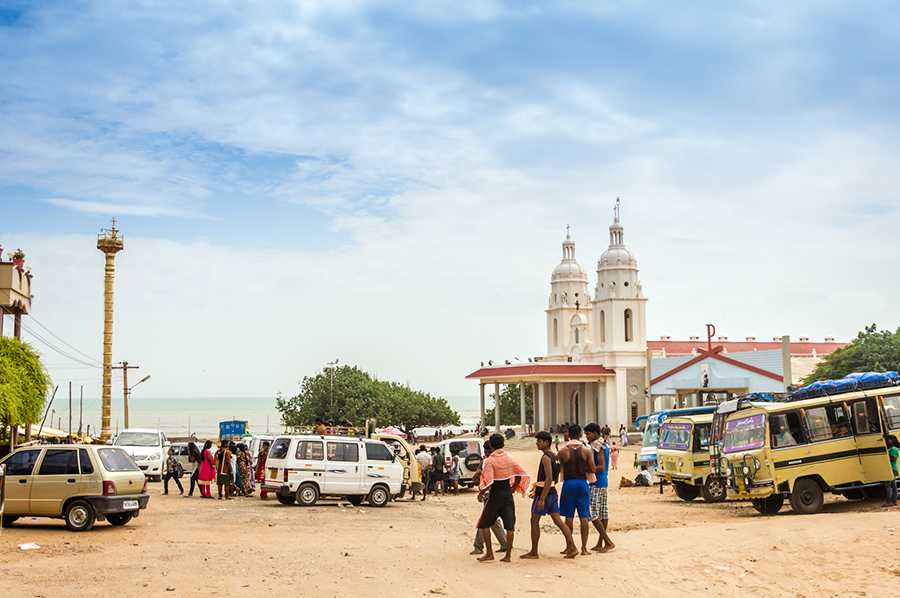
St. Antony's Church

Christian churches include:

- St. Anthony's Shrine Basilica, a Catholic church dedicated to St. Anthony of Padua, and the only place in Tamil Nadu that has a St. Anthony's church beside the sea.
- The Kappal Matha Church (Our Lady of Good Health), in the form of a ship carrying an airplane. The original church of St. Mary was damaged by sea erosion and replaced by this one, built in 1974. It features four shrines and many grottos.
- St. Andrew's Church
- Selva Matha Church (Our Lady of Good Wealth)
- Velankanni Matha Church (Our Lady of Good Health)

== History ==
According to Tamil history, the citizens of Uvari were called Bharathars of the Neithal (ocean) World. Uvari's historical name was Obeer Pattanam. It was ruled by the Pandyan dynasty.

In the 1530s, Portuguese and Spanish missionaries from Goa arrived and converted many Bharathars to the Roman Catholic religion. The Portuguese priests, acting as godfathers, gave surnames such as Fernando to the converted. Pandya retains a fish on its flag, a symbol of this era.

Legend has it that the crew of a Portuguese ship that sailed near Uvari in the seventeenth century contracted cholera. In an attempt to avert death, a carpenter aboard the ship carved an image of Saint Anthony (Anthony of Padua). Soon after, the entire crew were restored to health. When the ship docked at Uvari, the sailors placed the statue inside a hut in the village. In the 1940s, the villagers built a church with the original statue of St. Anthony holding the infant Jesus in his hand. St Anthony is said to perform many miracles daily for the people who flock there with faith in his intercession, therefore the church was upgraded to a shrine. Uvari is visited by Hindus and Christians from all over South India.

== Transport ==
Uvari is 80 km (50 miles) from Thoothukudi, 40 km (25 miles) from Tiruchendur, 60 km (37 miles) from Nagercoil, 48 km (30 miles) from Kaniyakumari, 75 km (47 miles) from Tirunelveli, 130 Km from Kovilpatti, 230 km (140 miles) from Madurai, and 260 km (160 miles) from Rameswaram.

The village has no train service. The nearest railway stations are located in Tiruchendur, 40 km (25 miles) away, and Kaniyakumari, 48 km (30 miles) away.The nearest airport is Tuticorin Airport, 100 km (62 miles) away, while the nearest international airport is Trivandrum International Airport, 131 km (81 miles) away

== Climate ==
The mean maximum temperature is around 37 °C (99 °F) in summer and 37 °C (99 °F) in winter, with humidity levels over 65 percent. The rainy season starts between October and January.
