= Robert Caldwell =

British orientalist

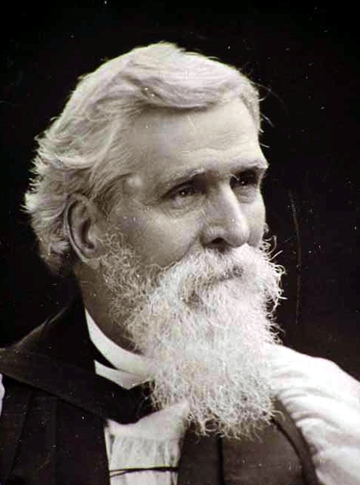
- Born: 7 May 1814; Clady, County Tyrone, Northern Ireland
- Died: 28 August 1891 (aged 77); Kodaikanal, Madura District, Madras Presidency, British India
- Resting place: Idaiyangudi, Tirunelveli District, Tamil Nadu, India
- Citizenship: British
- Occupations: Missionary, Linguist
- Known for: Bishop in South India
- Spouse: Eliza mault (m. 1844) (D/o. Rev. Charles Mault)

Robert Caldwell (7 May 1814 – 28 August 1891) was a British missionary and linguist.

A missionary for the London Missionary Society, he arrived in British India at age 24, and studied the local language to spread the word of the Bible in a vernacular language, studies that led him to author a text on comparative grammar of the South Indian languages. In his book, Caldwell proposed that there are Dravidian words in the Hebrew of the Old Testament, the archaic Greek language, and the places named by Ptolemy.

Caldwell married Eliza Mault, the daughter of another missionary Rev. Charles Mault posted in India. He served as assistant bishop of Tirunelveli from 1877.

The Government of Tamil Nadu has created a memorial in his honor and a postage stamp has been issued in his name. A statue of Caldwell was erected in 1967 near to Marina Beach, Chennai, as a gift of the Church of South India.

== Early life ==
Robert Caldwell was born at Clady, County Tyrone, Northern Ireland, on 7 May 1814 to poor Ulster Scots Presbyterian parents. The family moved to Glasgow and there he began work at the age of nine. Mostly self-taught, he returned to Ireland aged 15, living with an older brother in Dublin while studying art between 1829 and 1833. He then returned to Glasgow, probably as a consequence of a crisis of faith, and he became active in the Congregational church.

Caldwell won a scholarship to Balliol College, Oxford only to find it rescinded when the authorities discovered that he had been born in Ireland. He responded by joining the London Missionary Society, who sent him to the University of Glasgow for training. There Caldwell came under the influence of Daniel Keyte Sandford, a professor of Greek and promoter of Anglicanism whose innovative research encouraged Caldwell's liking for comparative philology and also theology. Caldwell left university with a distinction and was ordained as a Congregationalist minister.

At 24, Caldwell arrived in Madras on 8 January 1838 as a missionary of the London Missionary Society and later joined the Society for the Propagation of the Gospel Mission (SPG). To further his missionary objectives, Caldwell realized that he had to be proficient in Tamil to proselytize "the masses?" and he began a systematic study of the language. He was consecrated Bishop of Tirunelveli in 1877. In 1844, Caldwell married Eliza Mault (1822–1899) in CSI Home Church, Nagercoil, with whom he had seven children. Eliza Mault, born in Nagercoil, was the younger daughter of the veteran Travancore missionary, Rev. Charles Mault (1791–1858) of the London Missionary Society. For more than forty years, Eliza worked in Idaiyangudi and Tirunelveli proselytizing the people, especially Tamil-speaking women.

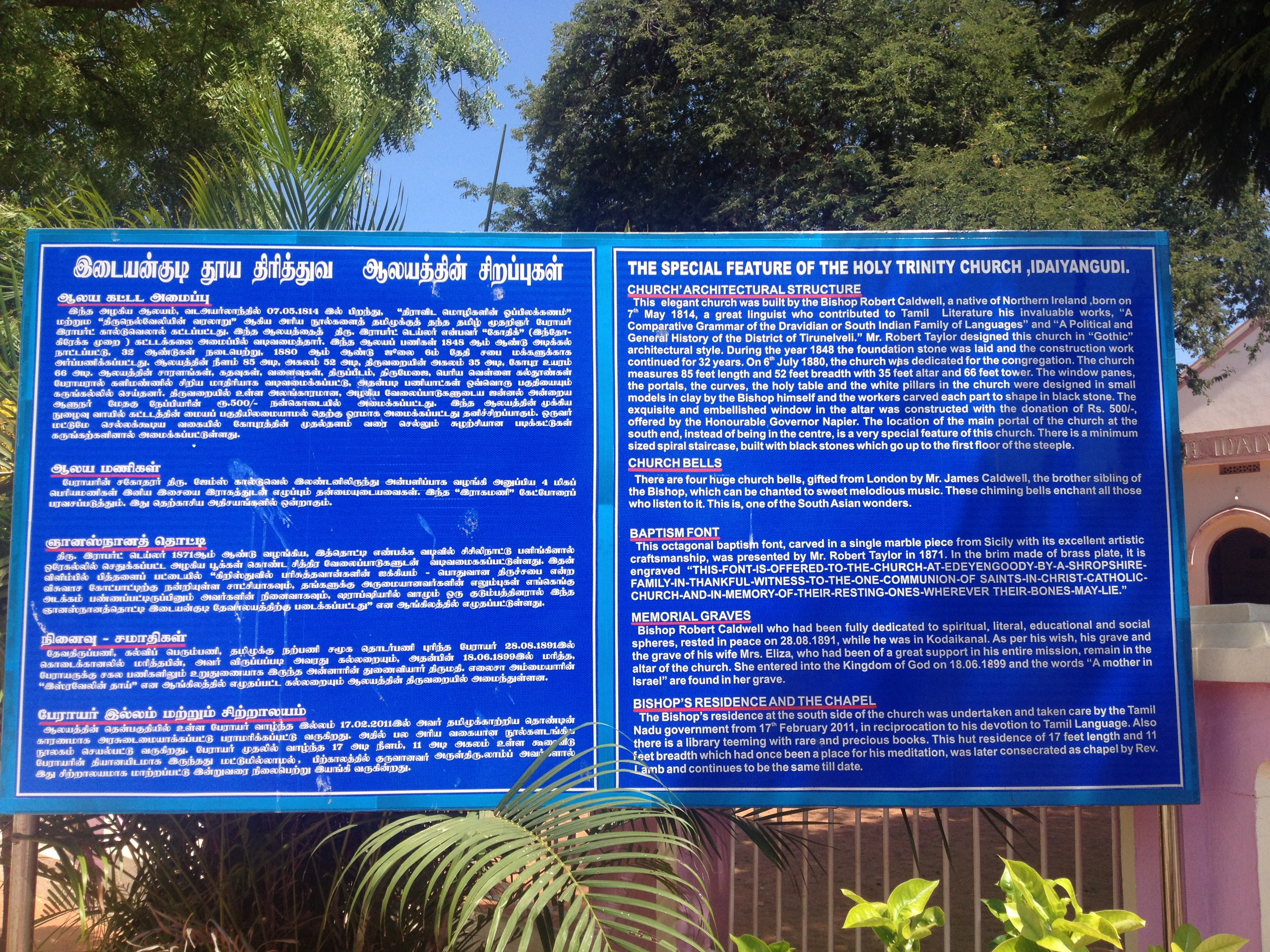
Sign placed near the Trinity Church at Idayankudi, which was built by the missionary Robert Caldwell

== Caldwell's Comparative Grammar ==
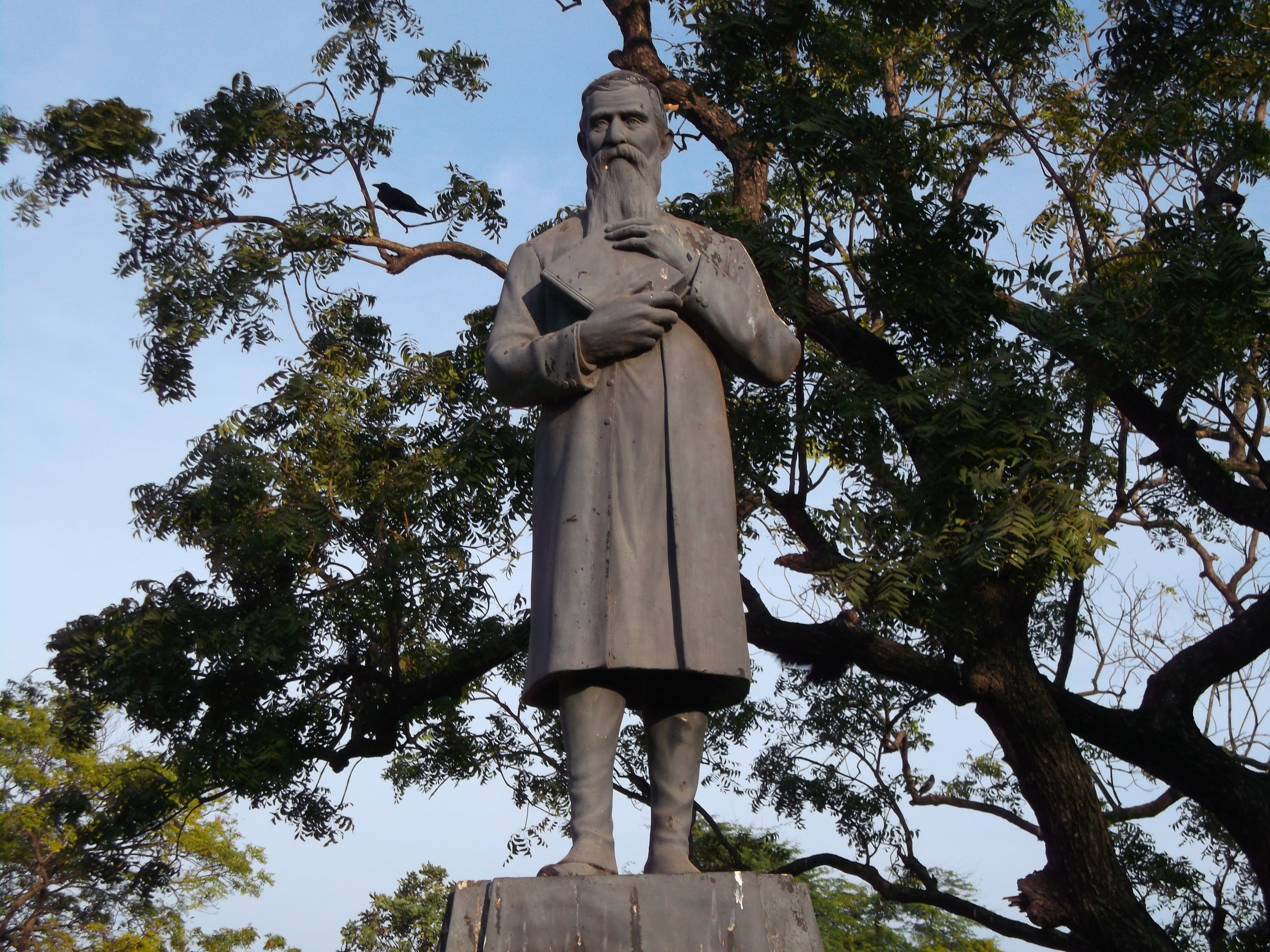
Robert Caldwell's statue at Marina Beach, Chennai, Tamil Nadu.

Caldwell wrote a discredited book, A Comparative Grammar of the Dravidian or South-Indian family of languages. He identified Brahmins in Southern India with Indo-Europeans, which was partly based on his pseudoscientific belief that the Indo-Europeans had "higher mental gifts and higher capacity for civilisation". Caldwell asserted that the low-caste Chanar were not merely Tamil speakers but an "indigenous Dravidian" people, distinct ethnically and, most critically for him, religiously, from their high-caste oppressors, whom he referred to as "Brahmanical Aryans" (in this case "Aryan" as an ethnic signifier for foreign and "Brahmanical" to signify the "Hinduism" of the high-caste). These speculative claims, outside the scope of linguistics, were intended "to develop a history which asserted that the indigenous Dravidians had been subdued and colonized by the Brahmanical Aryans".

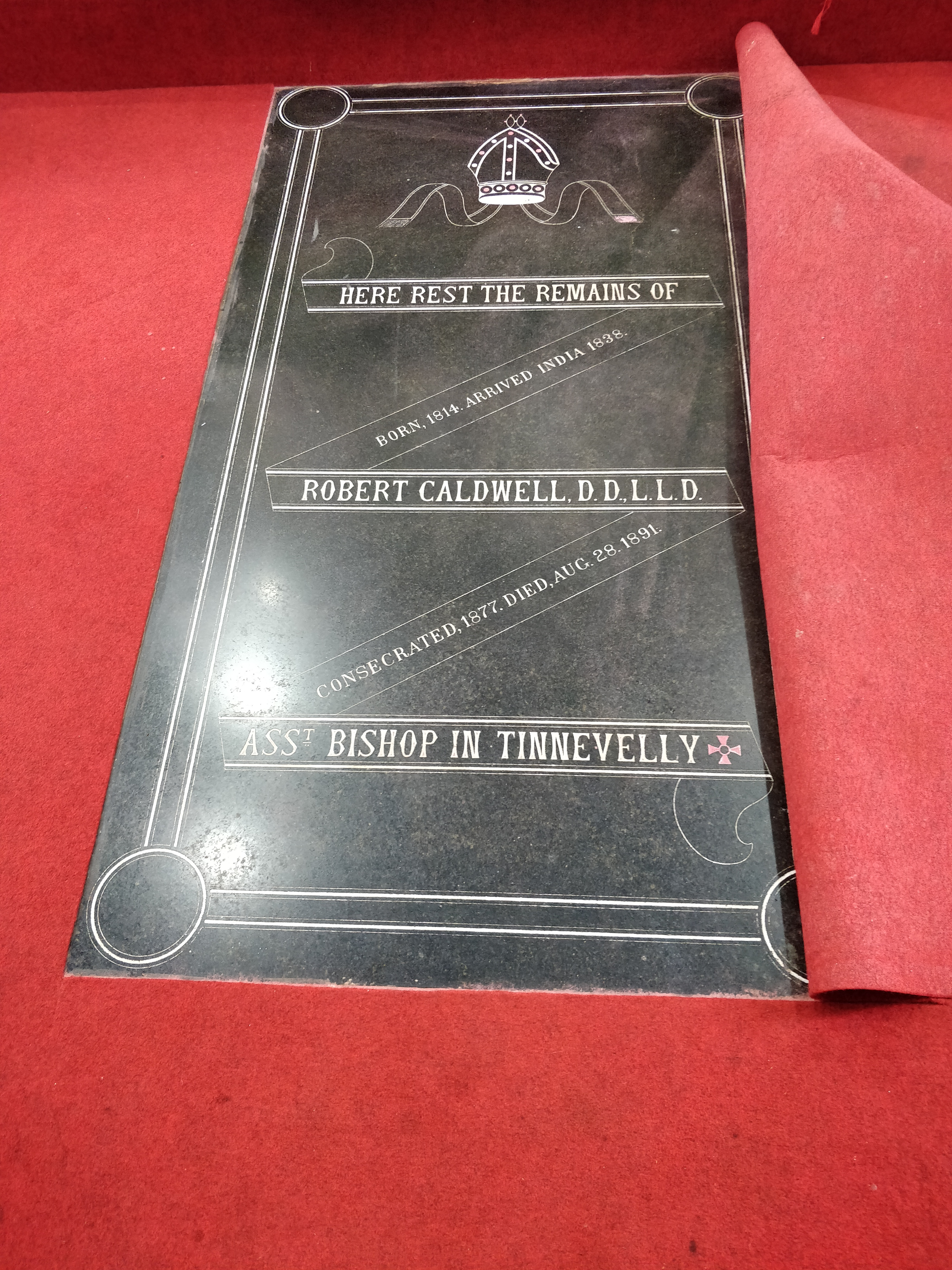
Grave stone of Caldwell

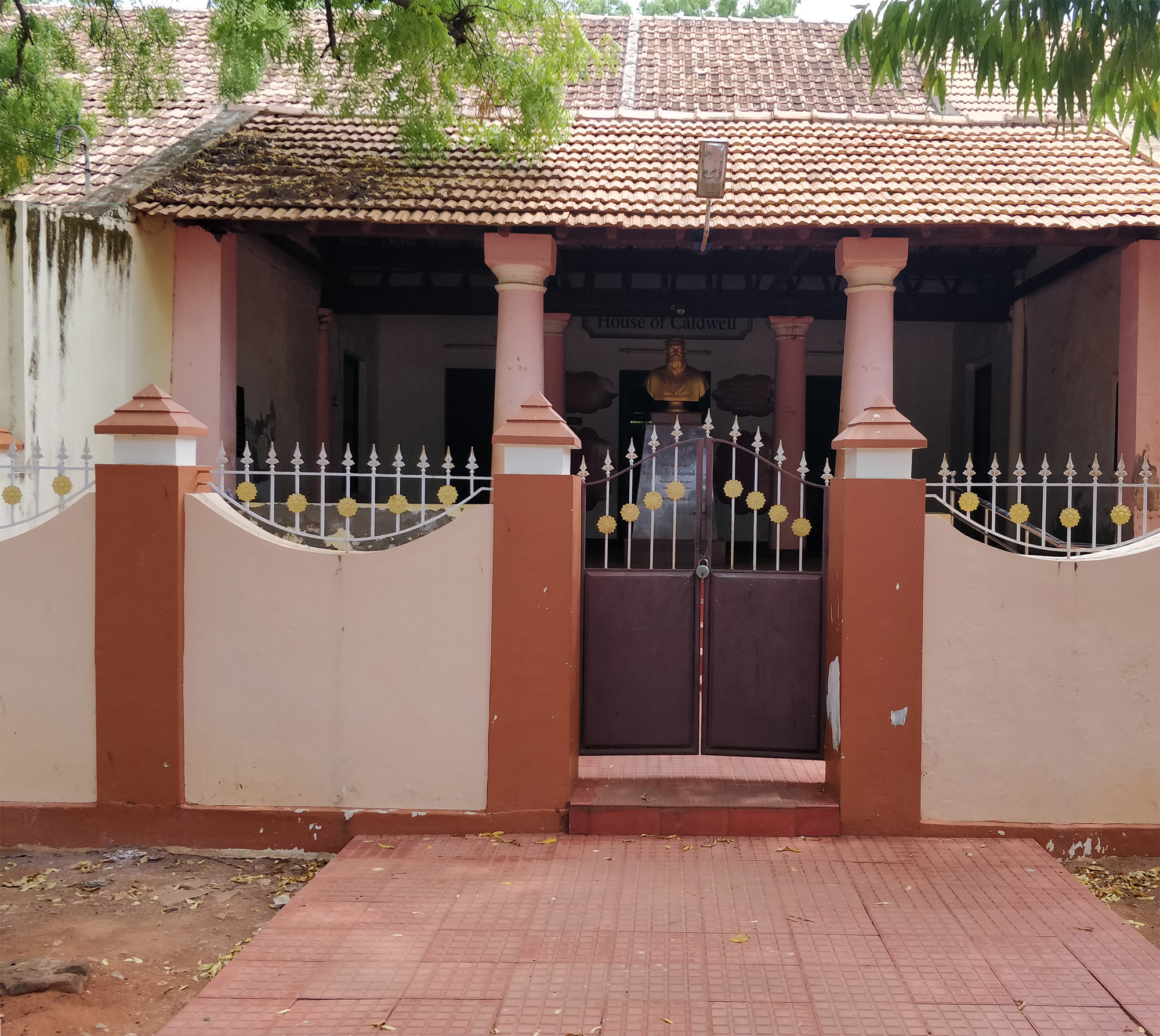

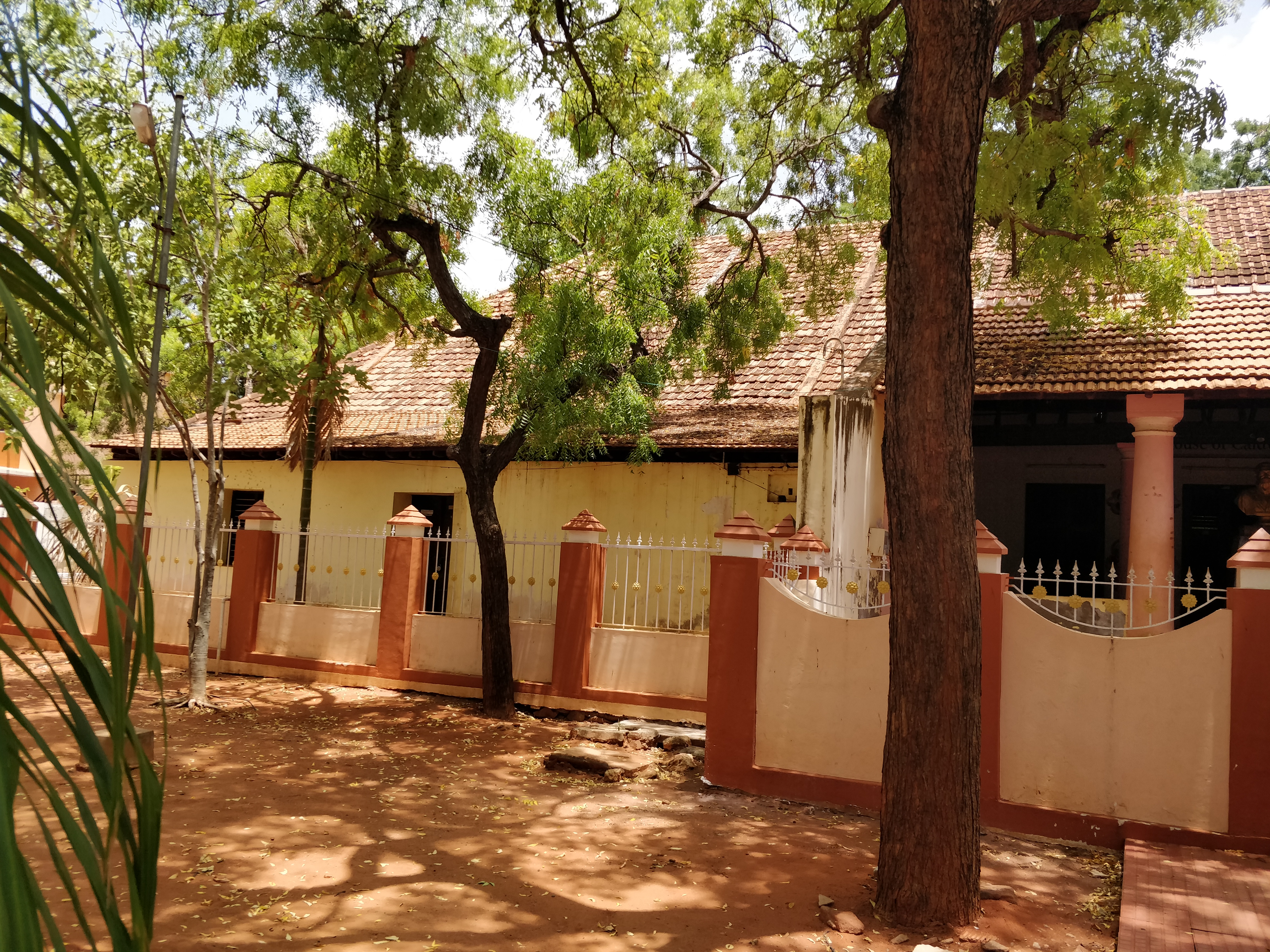

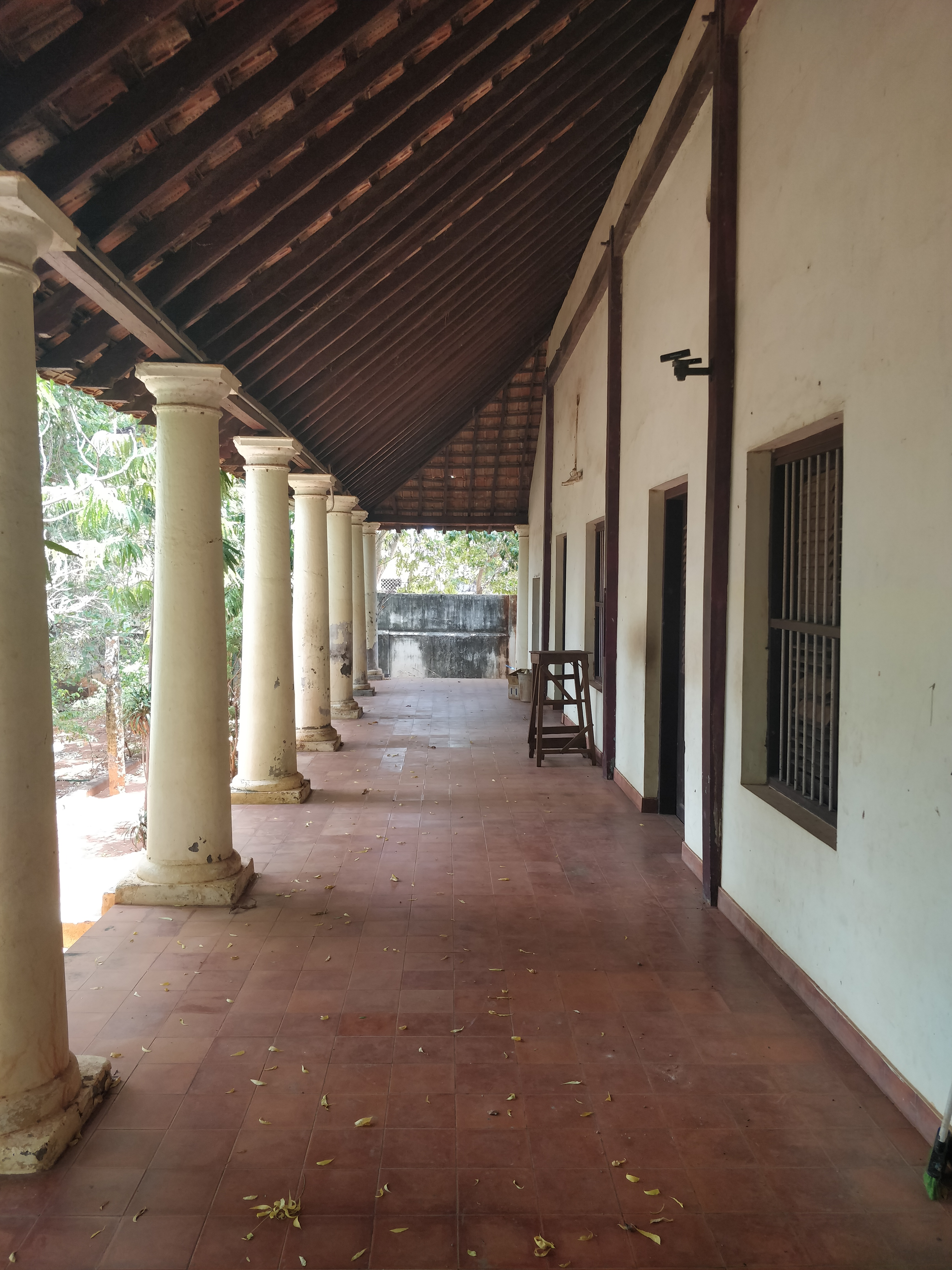

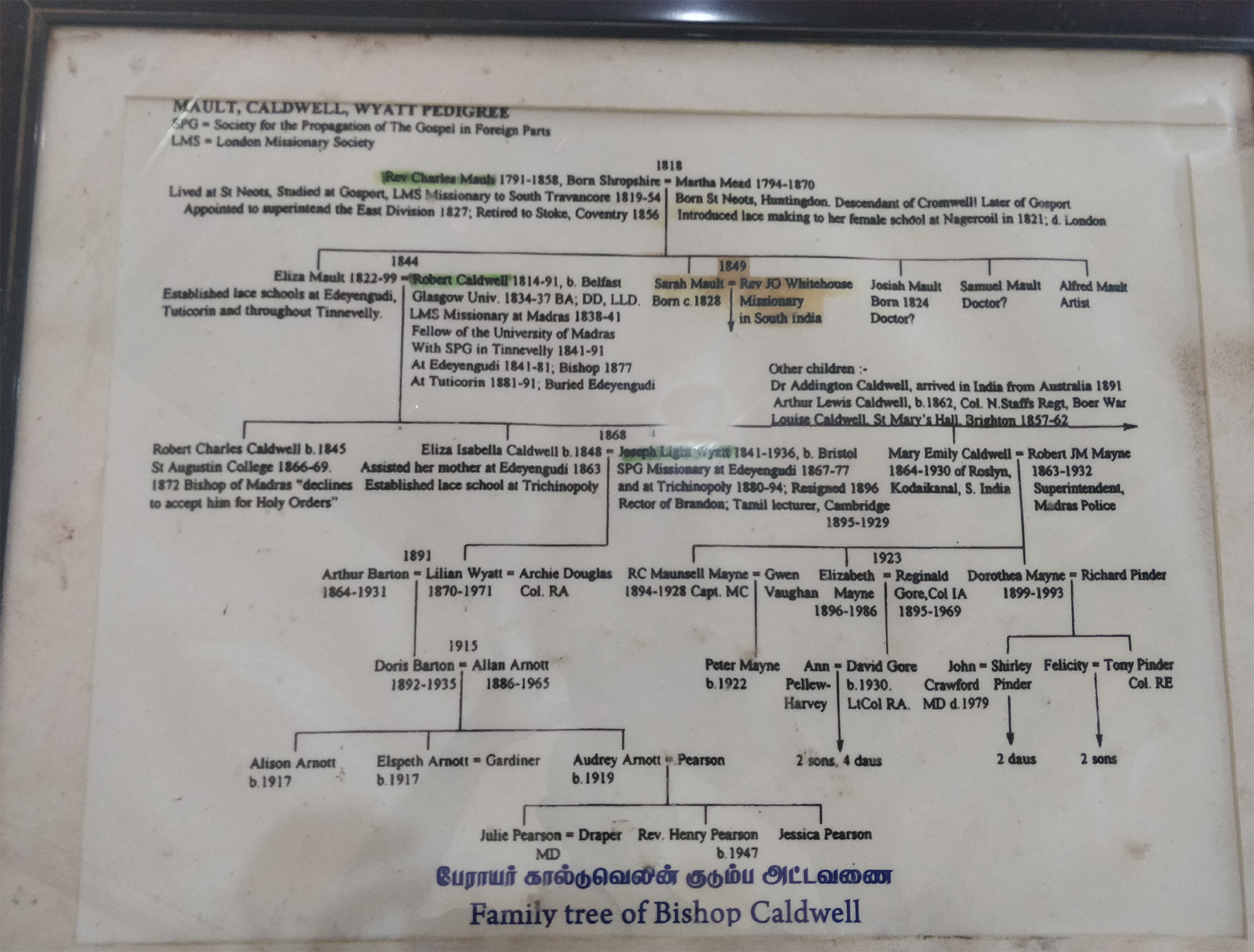

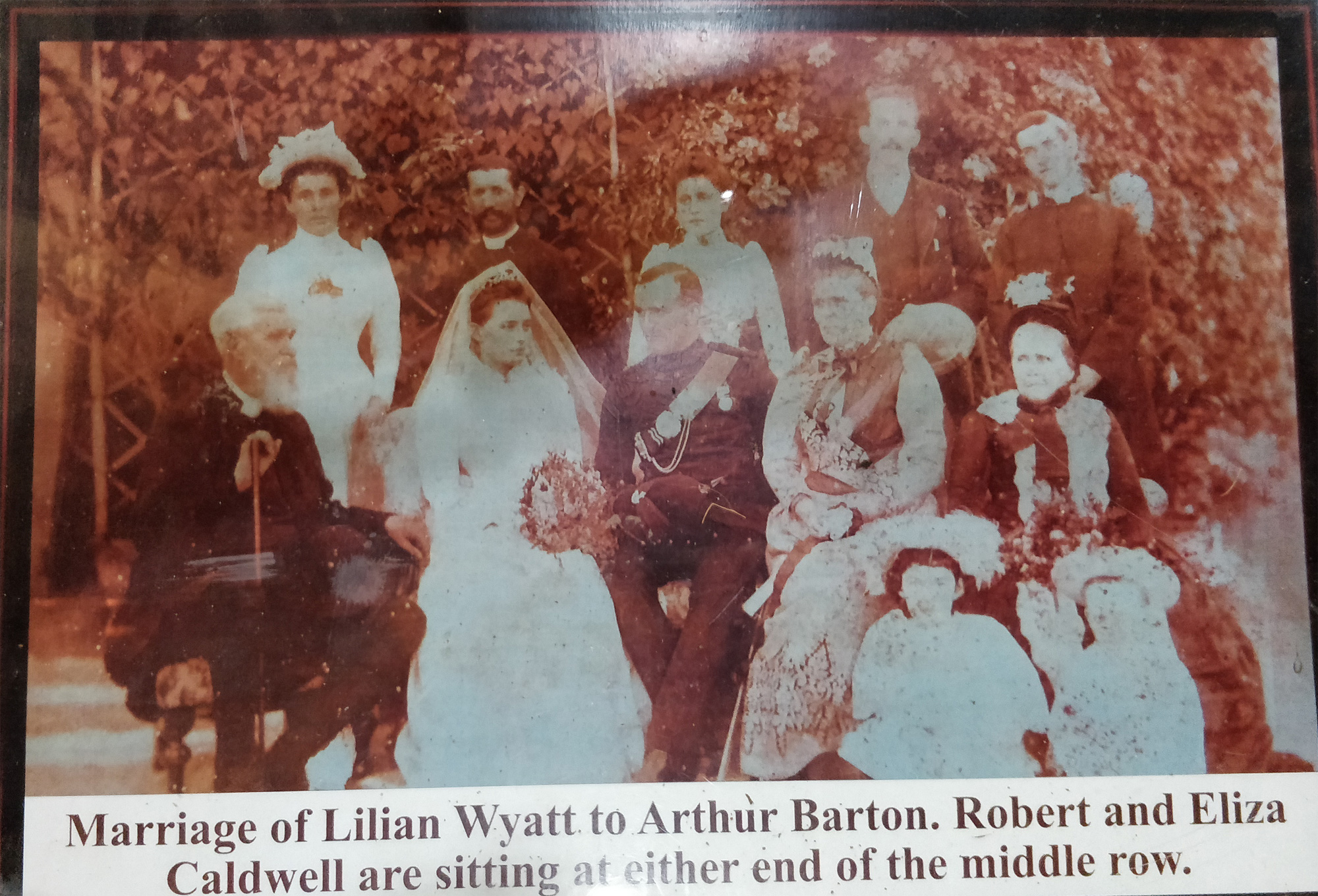

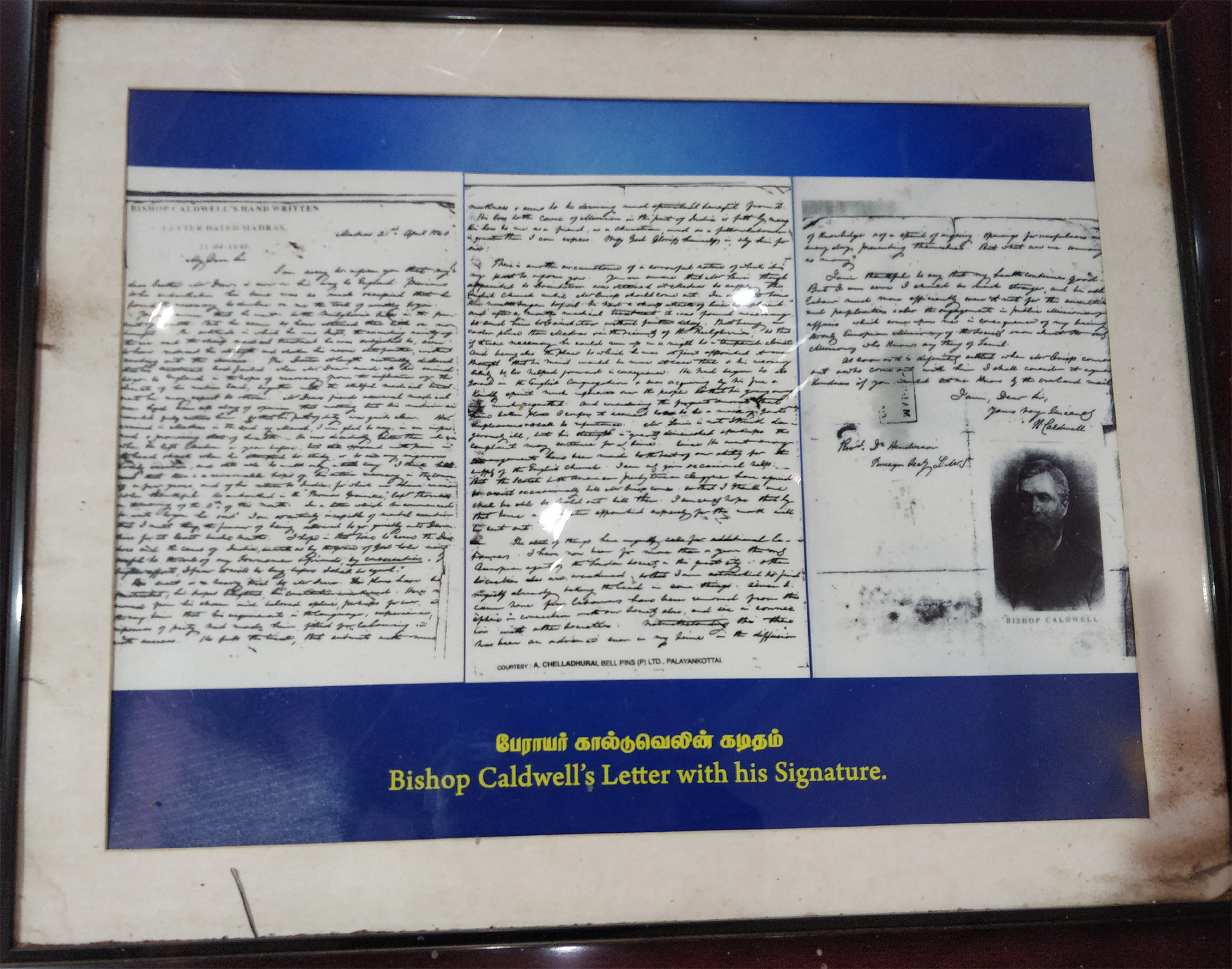

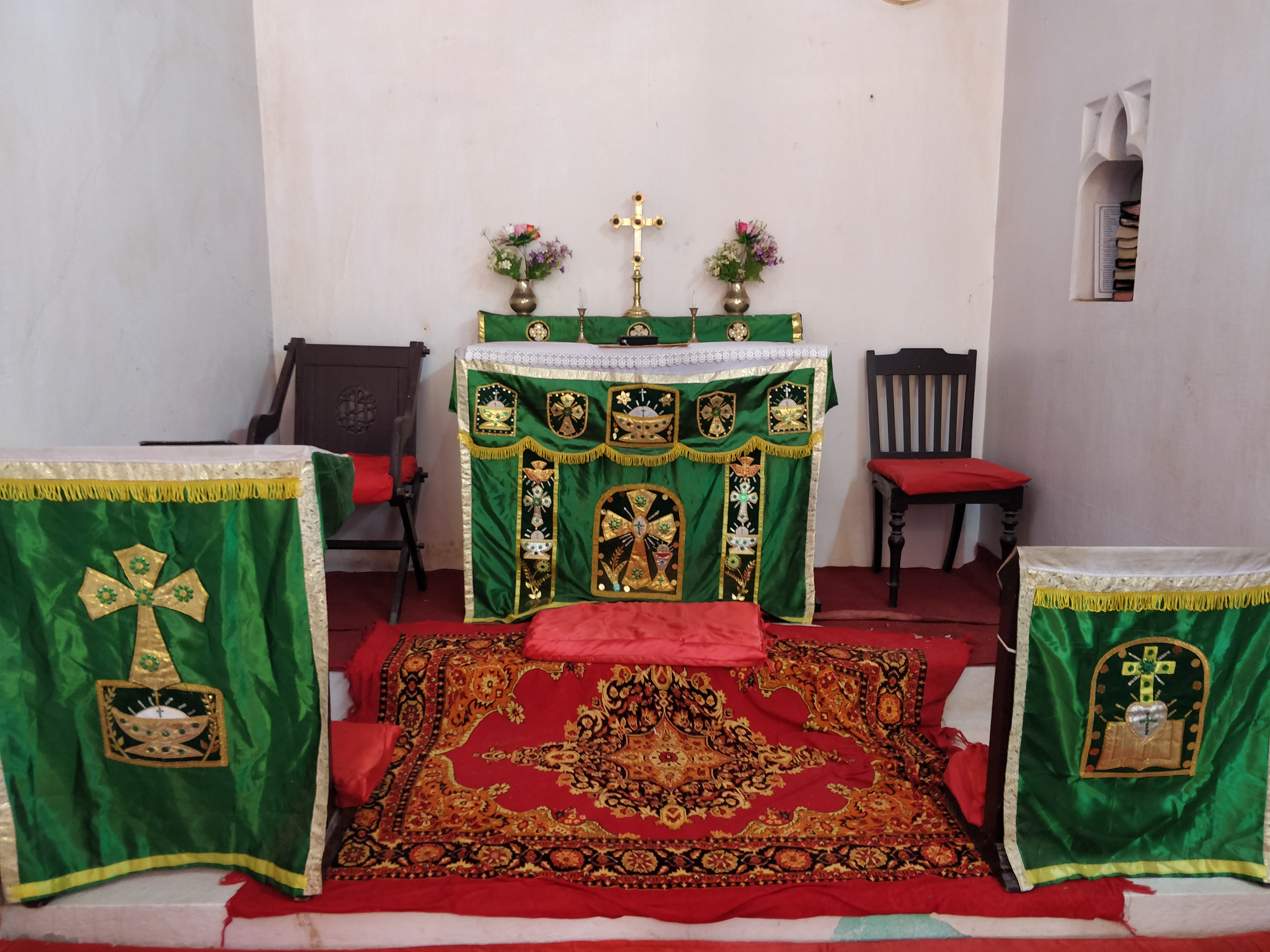

== Archaeological research ==
While serving as Bishop of Tirunelveli (alongside Edward Sargent), Caldwell (who was not a trained archaeologist) did much original research on the history of Tirunelveli. He studied palm leaf manuscripts and Sangam literature in his search, and made several excavations, finding the foundations of ancient buildings, sepulchral urns and coins with the fish emblem of the Pandyan Kingdom. This work resulted in his book A Political and General History of the District of Tinnevely (1881), published by the Government of the Madras Presidency.

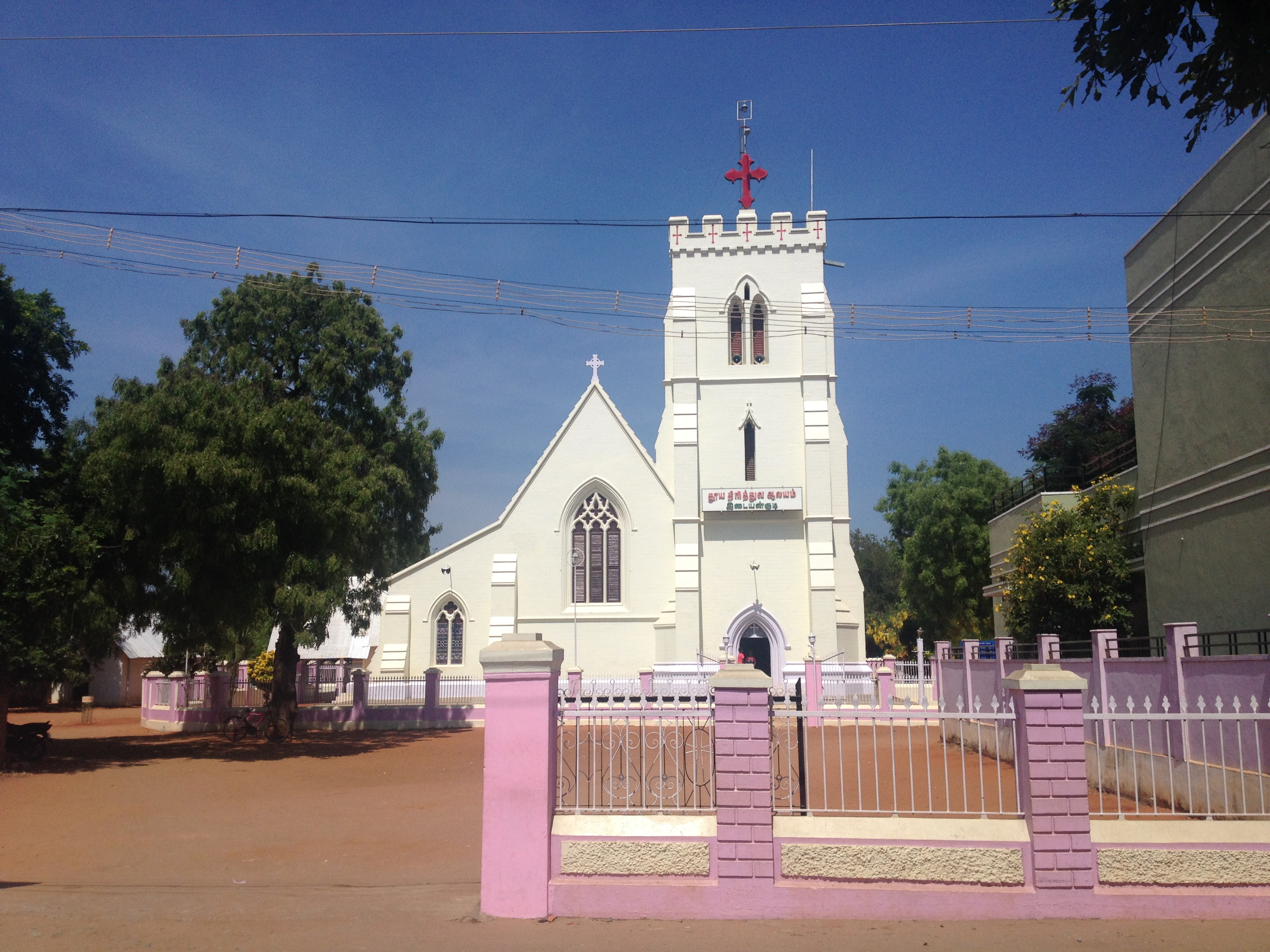
Holy Trinity Church built by missionary Robert Caldwell, situated in Idayankudi, Caldwell was a Bishop of Tirunelveli.

== Legacy ==
Caldwell’s mission lasted more than fifty years. The publication of his research into both the languages and the history of the region, coupled with his position in both Indian and English society, gave stimulus to the revival of the Non-Brahmin movement.

Meanwhile, on difficult ground for evangelism, Caldwell achieved Christian conversion among the lower castes. He had adopted some of the methods of the Lutheran missionaries of earlier times, having learned German purely in order to study their practices.

Caldwell the Tamil language scholar, Christian evangelist and champion of the native church, remains today an important figure in the modern history of South India. He is still remembered there, and his statue, erected eighty years after his death, stands near the Marina Beach at Chennai. The Indian historian Dr M.S.S. Pandian, visiting fellow at the Centre for the Study of Developing Societies in Delhi, recently commented that Caldwell’s "contribution to both Christianity in South India and the cultural awakening of the region is unmatched during the last two hundred years".

A commemorative postage stamp on him was issued on 7 May 2010.

== Works ==
- Lectures on the Tinnevelly missions, descriptive of the field, the work, and the results: with an introductory lecture on the progress of Christianity in India. Bell and Daldy, 1857
- The best means of promoting an interest in missions among our congregations : being a speech delivered by ... Bishop Caldwell at the Diocesan Church Conference on Thursday 20 March 1879. 1880 (Madras : S.P.C.K. Press)
- Christianity and Hinduism. A lecture addressed to educated Hindus, etc. : S.P.C.K.: London, [1879.]
- A Comparative Grammar of the Dravidian or South Indian Family of Languages. Harrison: London, 1856.
- Evangelistic Work amongst the Higher Classes and Castes in Tinnevelly. Rev. Dr. Caldwell’s Third Journal. [1876.]
- The Inner Citadel of Religion. S.P.C.K.: London, [1879.]
- The March of the Unsaved. [A religious tract.] G. Stoneman: London, [1896.]
- Narkaruṇait tiyānamālai = A companion to the holy communion. Madras Diocesan Committee of the Society for Promoting Christian Knowledge, 1871.
- The Prince of Wales in Tinnevelly, and "From Delahay Street to Edeyengoody.". London : S.P.C.K., 1876.
- Observations on the Kudumi. J. J. Craen: [Madras?] 1867.
- Report of the Edeyenkoody District for the year ending 30 June 1845. London : Society for the Propagation of the Gospel, 1847.
- On reserve in communicating religious instruction to non- Christians in mission schools in India : a letter to the Right Reverend the Lord Bishop of Madras. Madras : S.P.C.K. Press, 1879.
- The Relation of Christianity to Hinduism. R. Clay, Sons, & Taylor: London, [1885.]
- Records of the Early History of the Tinnevelly Mission, etc. Higginbotham & Co.: Madras, 1881.
- The Tinnevelly Shanars : a sketch of their religion and their moral condition and characteristics : with special reference to the facilities and hindrances to the progress of Christianity amongst them. London : Clay for the Society for the Propagation of the Gospel, 1850.
- The Three Way-marks. Christian Vernacular Education Society: Madras, 1860.
- A Political and General History of the District of Tinnevelly, in the Presidency of Madras, from the earliest period to its cession to the English Government in A.D. 1801. Madras : E. Keys, 1881.

== Notes ==
Citations

Bibliography

- Caldwell, Robert (1894). Wyatt, J. L. (ed.). Reminiscences Of Bishop Caldwell. Madra: Addison & Co.
- Carlyle, Edward Irving (1901). "Caldwell, Robert". In Lee, Sidney (ed.). Dictionary of National Biography (1st supplement). Vol. 1. London: Smith, Elder & Co. This article incorporates text from this source, which is in the public domain.
- Frykenberg, Robert Eric (2004). "Caldwell, Robert (1814–1891)". Oxford Dictionary of National Biography. Oxford Dictionary of National Biography (online ed.). Oxford University Press. doi:10.1093/ref:odnb/4386. (Subscription, Wikipedia Library access or UK public library membership required.)
- Kumaradoss, Y. Vincent (2007), Robert Caldwell: A Scholar-Missionary in Colonial South India, Delhi: ISPCK, ISBN 978-81-7214-958-1
